= Jay Duplass =

American filmmaker and actor (born 1973)

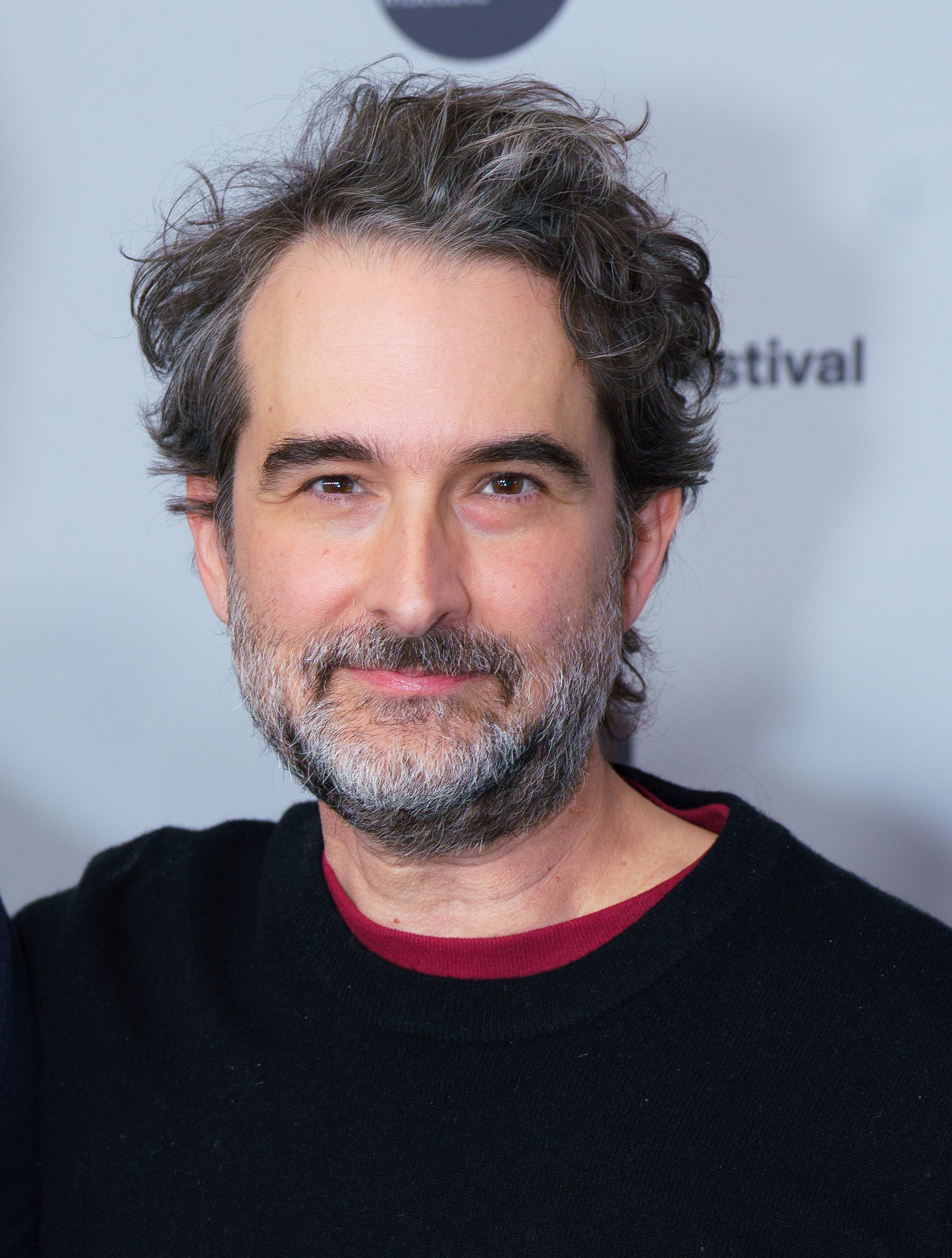
- Duplass in 2026
- Born: Lawrence Jay Duplass Jr. March 7, 1973 (age 53); New Orleans, Louisiana, U.S.
- Education: Jesuit High School
- Alma mater: University of Texas at Austin (BA)
- Occupations: Film director; film producer; writer; actor; author
- Years active: 1996–present
- Spouse: Jen Tracy
- Children: 2
- Relatives: Mark Duplass (brother); Katie Aselton (sister-in-law)

Lawrence Jay Duplass Jr. (born March 7, 1973) is an American filmmaker, actor, producer and author widely known for his films The Puffy Chair (2005), Cyrus (2010), and Jeff, Who Lives at Home (2011), made in collaboration with his younger brother, Mark Duplass. Jay and Mark run Duplass Brothers Productions together.

Duplass starred in the Amazon Video comedy-drama series Transparent (2014–2019), and co-created the HBO comedy-drama series Togetherness (2015–16) and the HBO anthology series Room 104 (2017–2020).

== Early life ==
Duplass was born in New Orleans, Louisiana, the son of Cynthia (née Ernst) and Lawrence Duplass. He was raised in a Catholic family, and he attended Jesuit High School. Duplass graduated from the University of Texas at Austin; he started a Master of Fine Arts degree in film at UT but withdrew in the first few months to pursue independent film projects. His ancestry includes French Cajun, Italian, Ashkenazi Jewish, and German roots.

== Career ==
=== Directing ===
Duplass attributes much of his and his brother's love for film to his appreciation for Raising Arizona. In an interview with Robert K. Elder for The Film That Changed My Life, Duplass speculates on what might have happened had he not seen the film in his youth.

I probably wouldn't be making movies—seriously. It held over for so long. It really was the root of everything that Mark and I always hold ourselves to in making movies. That is to say that Raising Arizona is the most inspired movie that I have ever seen.

In 2015, Mark and Jay Duplass via their Duplass Brothers Television label signed an overall deal with HBO. In 2012, Duplass participated in the Sight & Sound film polls of that year.

=== Acting ===
In 2014, he starred as Josh Pfefferman in the Amazon Prime Original Comedy-Drama Series Transparent, alongside Jeffrey Tambor, Gaby Hoffmann, Amy Landecker and Judith Light. The series was met with widespread critical acclaim, earning 11 Primetime Emmy nominations, including nominations for Best Comedy Series and Best Actor in a Comedy Series for Jeffrey Tambor. In the second season of the show, Duplass's role became more prominent, and he was nominated for the Critics' Choice Television Award for Best Supporting Actor in a Comedy Series.

Prior to Transparent, Duplass had never acted in a featured part. He was talking with director Joey Soloway at a dinner party about the difficulty they were having finding an actor to play what would end up being Duplass's role. After suggesting many actors for the part to Soloway, Soloway turned to Duplass and told him that he should play the part.

== Filmography ==
=== Feature film ===
Year	Title	Credited as		
Year	Title	Director	Writer	Producer
2005	The Puffy Chair	Yes	Yes	Uncredited
2008	Baghead	Yes	Yes	Yes
2010	Cyrus	Yes	Yes	No
2011	Jeff, Who Lives at Home	Yes	Yes	No
2012	The Do-Deca-Pentathlon	Yes	Yes	Yes
2017	Table 19	No	Story	No
2017	Outside In	No	Yes	Executive
2018	Prospect	No	Yes	No
2025	The Baltimorons	Yes	Yes	Executive
2026	See You When I See You	Yes	No	Executive

Executive producer only

- Lovers of Hate (2010)
- Black Rock (2012)
- Safety Not Guaranteed (2012)
- Bad Milo! (2013)
- The Skeleton Twins (2014)
- The One I Love (2014)
- Adult Beginners (2014)
- Tangerine (2015)
- Manson Family Vacation (2015)
- The Bronze (2015)
- The Overnight (2015)
- 6 Years (2015)
- Rainbow Time (2016)
- Asperger's Are Us (2016)
- Blue Jay (2016)
- Take Me (2017)
- Duck Butter (2018)
- Unlovable (2018)
- Paddleton (2019)
- Horse Girl (2020)
- Young Hearts (2021)
- Drought (2021)
- As of Yet (2021)
- The MisEducation of Bindu (2021)
- Language Lessons (2021)
- Not Going Quietly (2021)
- 7 Days (2021)
- Spin Me Round (2022)
- I’ll Show You Mine (2022)
- Tony Hawk: Until the Wheels Fall Off (2022)
- The Drop (2023)
- Jason Isbell: Running With Our Eyes Closed (2023)
- Biosphere (2023)
- Last Stop Larrimah (2023)
- Jazzy (2024)
- The Knife (2024)

=== Short film ===
Year	Title	Credited as			Notes
Year	Title	Director	Producer	Writer	Notes
1996	Connect 5	No	Yes	No	
2002	The New Brad	Yes	Yes	Yes	
2003	This is John	Yes	No	No	
2003	Death for Sale	No	Yes	No	
2004	Scrapple	Yes	Yes	Yes	
2005	The Intervention	Yes	No	No	
2011	Kevin	Yes	Yes	Yes	Documentary short
2011	Maurice	No	No	Executive	Documentary short
2011	Authoritative Sources	Yes	No	No	Segment of Slacker 2011
2020	The Ride	No	No	Executive	

=== Television ===
Year	Title	Credited as			Notes
Year	Title	Director	Executive Producer	Writer	Notes
2015–2016	Togetherness	Yes	Yes	Yes	Co-creator
2014	Wedlock	No	Yes	No	
2016–2018	Animals.	No	Yes	No	
2017–2020	Room 104	No	Yes	No	Co-creator
2018	Co-Ed	No	Yes	No	
2018	Evil Genius	No	Yes	No	Documentary series
2018	Wild Wild Country	No	Yes	No	Documentary series
2019	On Tour with Asperger's Are Us	No	Yes	No	Documentary series
2019	Shook	No	Yes	No	
2020	Search Party	Yes	No	No	Directed 2 episodes
2021	The Lady and the Dale	No	Yes	No	Documentary series
2021	Sasquatch	No	Yes	No	Documentary series
2021	Cinema Toast	Yes	Yes	Yes	Wrote & directed 1 episode
2022–2024	Somebody Somewhere	Yes	Yes	No	Directed 6 episodes
2024	American Conspiracy: The Octopus Murders	No	Yes	No	Documentary series

=== Acting roles ===
==== Film ====
Year	Title	Role	Notes
2008	Nights and Weekends	James' brother	
2011	Slacker 2011	Boyfriend	
2015	Manson Family Vacation	Nick	
2015	Paper Towns	English Teacher	
2016	Rainbow Time	Adam	
2017	Landline	Ben	
2017	Beatriz at Dinner	Alex	
2017	Outside In	Chris Connelly	
2018	Prospect	Damon	
2018	Duck Butter	Jay	
2018	The Oath	Clark Stewart	
2019	Pink Wall	Leon	
2019	Phil	Malcolm	
2020	Horse Girl	Ethan	
2020	Shithouse	Professor Notkin	Uncredited
2022	Ghostwritten	Guy Laury	
2023	The Caine Mutiny Court-Martial	Lieutenant Allen Bird MD	
2023	Pain Hustlers	Larkin	
2026	I Play Rocky	John G. Avildsen	
2026	Other Mommy	Russell "Russ" Martin	

==== Television ====
Year	Title	Role	Notes
2012–2017	The Mindy Project	Duncan Deslaurier	13 episodes
2014–2019	Transparent	Josh Pfefferman	38 episodes
2016	Animals.	Dennis (voice)	2 episodes
2017–2020	Search Party	Elijah	7 episodes
2017	Room 104	Daniel	Episode: "I Knew You Weren't Dead"
2019	Drunk History	John C. Lilly	Episode: "Drugs"
2019	Stumptown	Alan	Episode: "Missed Connections"
2021	The Chair	Bill Dobson	6 episodes
2021	Cinema Toast	(voice)	1 episode
2022	Industry	Jesse Bloom	7 episodes
2024	Percy Jackson and the Olympians	Hades	Episode: "We Find Out the Truth, Sort Of"
2025	Dying for Sex	Steve	Miniseries
2026–present	Sterling Point	Steven Jacobson	6 episodes

== Bibliography ==
- Like Brothers (2018) (with Mark Duplass)

== Awards and nominations ==
Year	Award	Category	Nominee(s)	Result	Ref.
2022	Peabody Awards	Entertainment	Somebody Somewhere	Nominated	
