= Duplass =

Duplass is a surname. Notable people with the surname include:

- Jay Duplass (born 1973), American actor, director, screenwriter and producer
- Mark Duplass (born 1976), American actor, director, screenwriter, producer and musician

== See also ==
- Duplass Brothers Productions, their production company
