= The Drop (2022 film) =

Film by Sarah Adina Smith

- Official release poster
- Directed by: Sarah Adina Smith
- Written by: Joshua Leonard; Sarah Adina Smith
- Produced by: Lia Buman; Jonako Donley; Mel Eslyn; Shuli Harel; Tim Headington; Joshua Leonard; Sarah Adina Smith
- Starring: Anna Konkle; Jermaine Fowler; Jillian Bell; Utkarsh Ambudkar
- Cinematography: Shaheen Seth
- Edited by: Daniel Garber; Sarah Adina Smith
- Music by: Ellen Reid
- Production companies: Duplass Brothers Productions; Everything Is Everything; Perception Media; Tango Entertainment
- Distributed by: Hulu
- Release dates: June 11, 2022 (Tribeca); January 13, 2023 (United States)
- Running time: 92 minutes
- Country: United States
- Language: English

The Drop is a 2022 American comedy film directed by Sarah Adina Smith, written by Smith and Joshua Leonard, and starring Anna Konkle and Jermaine Fowler. It premiered at the 2022 Tribeca Film Festival and was released on Hulu on January 13, 2023. It received mixed reviews from critics.

== Plot ==
The film follows a young married couple, Lex and Mani, running an artisanal bakery in Los Angeles and making plans to start a family. Their plans are thrown into upheaval when, while at a tropical resort for a destination wedding, Lex accidentally drops their friend's baby.

== Cast ==
- Anna Konkle as Lex
- Jermaine Fowler as Mani
- Jillian Bell as Lindsey
- Utkarsh Ambudkar as Robbie
- Robin Thede as Shauna
- Aparna Nancherla as Mia
- Joshua Leonard as Josh
- Jennifer Lafleur as Peggy
- Elisha Henig as Levi
- Susan Sullivan as Lex's Mom

== Production ==
The script was written by Sarah Adina Smith, who also directed the film, and Joshua Leonard, who also appears in the film. Smith and Leonard produced alongside Jonako Donley, Mel Eslyn, Shuli Harel, Tim Headington, and Lia Buman. It was executive produced by Mark Duplass and Jay Duplass. Smith said she had the idea for the story while thinking about the 2014 Swedish film Force Majeure. It was filmed in the United States and Mexico during the COVID-19 pandemic, which Smith said was a challenge.

== Release ==
The film had its world premiere at the Tribeca Film Festival on June 11, 2022. The film was released on Hulu on January 13, 2023.

== Reception ==
=== Critical response ===
On the review aggregator website Rotten Tomatoes, the film holds an approval rating of 51% based on reviews from 41 critics. The website's critics consensus reads, "The Drop has its finger on the pulse and a game cast trying to keep it alive, but despite its heart being in the right place, this comedy's electrocardiogram is as flat as the Great Plains."

Fletcher Powell of KMUW said, "The Drop is funny. Sometimes very funny. And a lot of that has to do with its relaxed pace—a lot of movies like this would play up the shock and zaniness. These things tend to get a little too in your face. And there is plenty of shock, or at least surprise, but director and writer Sarah Adina Smith and her fantastic cast aren’t concerned with telling you very loudly that this is funny, they just let it be funny." Noel Murray of the Los Angeles Times wrote that while the film "doesn't always work as a comedy, it does have the ring of hard-won truth" by demonstrating "how someone's seemingly rock-solid reputation can be undone in an instant."

Tara Bennett of IGN gave the film a grade of six out of ten, asserting, "The Drop has a great premise that doesn’t get fleshed out in a way that honors such an audacious idea. While Konkle and Fowler are very strong as the central relationship being tested, the script treats them more as easy punchlines trying to navigate a series of escalating, cringe-worthy friend faux paus. While there’s a good amount to laugh at because of the caliber of comedians involved, by the end it lands more like great potential, mostly wasted." Christy Lemire of RogerEbert.com gave the film one and a grade of half out of four stars, saying that despite an "intriguing premise, The Drop never reaches its full cringe comedy potential."

=== Accolades ===
Sarah Adina Smith was nominated for Best U.S. Narrative Feature at the 2022 Tribeca Film Festival.
