= Duck Butter =

- Theatrical release poster
- Directed by: Miguel Arteta
- Written by: Miguel Arteta; Alia Shawkat
- Produced by: Mel Eslyn; Natalie Qasabian
- Starring: Alia Shawkat; Laia Costa; Mae Whitman; Hong Chau; Kate Berlant
- Cinematography: Hilary Spera
- Edited by: Chris Donlon
- Music by: Kaitlyn Aurelia Smith
- Production companies: Duplass Brothers Productions; Netflix
- Distributed by: The Orchard
- Release dates: April 20, 2018 (Tribeca); April 27, 2018 (United States)
- Running time: 93 minutes
- Country: United States
- Language: English
- Box office: $6,877

Duck Butter is a 2018 American independent comedy film directed by Miguel Arteta, from a screenplay by Arteta and Alia Shawkat. It stars Shawkat, Laia Costa, Mae Whitman, Hong Chau and Kate Berlant.

It had its world premiere at the Tribeca Film Festival on April 20, 2018. It was released on April 27, 2018, by The Orchard.

== Plot summary ==
Naima is an actor beginning work on her first major film, directed by Mark and Jay. She struggles to connect with the material, and has a conversation about it with Mark and Jay, who imply that it is due to a lack of vulnerability on her part. After taking a friend to a date at a gay bar, Naima meets Sergio, an esoteric girl who performs a song at the bar. After going home with Sergio and her friends, the two have sex. While discussing relationships, Sergio proposes the idea of spending 24 hours with a person - including having sex once per hour - in order to 'fast forward' a relationship and get to know a person as quickly as possible. Naima is uncomfortable and declines, but continues to be intrigued by the idea the next day after the freedom she felt with Sergio.

Naima receives a call that she has been replaced on the movie. That evening, she spontaneously decides to return to Sergio's house and take her up on her offer. Sergio is reticent, but decides to go through with it after Naima promises not to leave. Over the course of the evening, the two create art, have sex, and discuss their feelings on life, sex, and previous relationships with both men and women. Sergio is more adventurous and unburdened by societal pressures, while Naima struggles with her insecurities. At different points throughout the night she feels excited by Sergio's free spiritedness, but frustrated by her aggressive frankness, both conversationally and sexually.

The two share about their difficult relationships with their mothers. Sergio's mother Susana comes to see her perform in a musical showcase. Naima suggests that they eat breakfast at Naima's house, which was purchased for her by her father. Naima begins to feel friction in the relationship, briefly suffering a panic attack and dealing with Sergio's anxiety about her mother's arrival. While eating, Sergio and Susana have an argument, with Susana criticizing Sergio's artistic integrity. Susana shares her opinions on sex with Naima, claiming that it is more impersonal than love. Sergio is upset after Susana leaves; after Susana returns to retrieve her forgotten iPad, Naima comforts and kisses Sergio while looking at Susana, who silently leaves. Despite this, the relationship between the two remains strained.

Naima suggests that they have group sex with Kathy and Glow, a couple Sergio is friends with. Sergio is upset by the idea but agrees to it. As the four begin kissing, however, Naima becomes overwhelmed by the situation. Despite her asking Kathy and Glow to stay to discuss the situation, they decide to leave. The tension between the two reaches its peak as Naima retreats to the bathroom to be alone. In retaliation, Sergio defecates in a pan, something she used to do to her mother as a child. The two argue, with Sergio criticizing Naima for failing to be honest during their time together. Sergio leaves the house.

At the music showcase, Sergio performs an a capella cover of Elvis Presley's "Suppose", hearkening back to an argument between her and Naima about cover songs. After spending the evening frightened and annoyed by Sergio's dog, Naima rescues a dog she sees on the street.

== Cast ==
- Alia Shawkat as Naima
- Laia Costa as Sergio
- Mae Whitman as Ellen
- Hong Chau as Glow
- Kate Berlant as Kathy
- Angelina Llongueras as Susana
- Lindsay Burdge as herself
- Kumail Nanjiani as himself
- Mark Duplass as himself
- Jay Duplass as himself
- Jenny O'Hara as Nathalie

== Production ==
The initial draft of the film, written by Alia Shawkat and Miguel Arteta, the film focused on a male and a female couple over the course of a year-and-a-half. Then it shifted to a male and female couple who decide to have sex every hour on the hour to find intimacy. Shawkat, who was cast in the lead role, met with actors, who were uncomfortable with the idea. The two initially cast Laia Costa, who only agreed to portray a supporting role in the film if she could remain on set during the entire 24-hour shoot. Arteta and Shawkat decided to re-write the role for a woman.

In September 2016, it was announced Shawkat and Costa had been cast in the film, with Arteta directing from a screenplay by him and Shawkat. Mark Duplass and Jay Duplass will serve as producers under their Duplass Brothers Productions banner.

Principal photography began in September 2016, over the course of nine days, with majority of the film being shot over the course of 24 hours.

== Release ==
In 2018, Variety announced that The Orchard and Netflix would distribute the film. It had its world premiere at the Tribeca Film Festival on April 20, 2018. It was released on April 27, 2018.

== Critical reception ==
Duck Butter received mixed reviews from film critics. It holds a 55% approval rating on review aggregator website Rotten Tomatoes, based on 38 reviews, with an average of 6.1/10. The website's critical consensus reads, "Duck Butter has a pair of compelling leads and a refreshing female-driven perspective, but its story is ultimately too thin to support a feature-length production." On Metacritic, the film holds a rating of 60 out of 100, based on 15 critics, indicating "mixed or average" reviews.

Katie Rife of The A.V. Club gave the film a C+, panning it for not giving Costa's character depth and calling the film "clever without being all that hilarious, and personal without being all that revealing".

== Accolades ==
Year	Festival	Category	Nominee	Result	Ref.
2018	Tribeca Film Festival	Best Narrative Feature	Miguel Arteta	Nominated	
2018	Tribeca Film Festival	Best Actress in a U.S. Narrative Feature Film	Alia Shawkat	Won	
