= Young Hearts =

Young Hearts may refer to:

== Film and TV ==
- Young Hearts (1936 film) (Jonge Harten), Dutch film
- Young Hearts (1944 film) (Junge Herzen), German film
- Young Hearts (1952 film) (Mladé srdcia), Slovak film
- Young Hearts (1953 film) (Ifjú szívvel), Hungarian comedy film
- Young Hearts (2020 film), an American film
- Young Hearts (2024 film), a Belgian-Dutch film
- Malhação, Brazilian soap opera
- Young Hearts (The Curse), an episode of the TV series The Curse

== Music ==
- Young Hearts (album), a 2003 compilation album by the Steve Miller Band
- "Young Hearts" (song), a 1982 song by The Little Heroes
- "Young Hearts", a song by Four Letter Lie from A New Day
- "Young Hearts", a song by Commuter from The Karate Kid

== See also ==
- "Young Hearts Run Free", a 1976 disco song
- "Young hearts, be free tonight", first line of Young Turks (song), a 1981 Rod Stewart song sometimes mistakenly known as "Young Hearts"
- Young Heart, a 2021 album by Birdy
