= Mike Makowsky =

American screenwriter (born 1991)

- Born: May 9, 1991 (age 35); Bayside, New York, U.S.
- Education: Brown University
- Occupation: Filmmaker
- Years active: 2017–present

Mike Makowsky (born May 9, 1991) is an American screenwriter and producer. He is the creator of the Netflix limited series Death by Lightning, which chronicles the assassination of President James Garfield. He also wrote and produced the HBO true crime dramedy film Bad Education, for which he received a Primetime Emmy Award in 2020.

== Early life and career ==
Makowsky was born in Bayside, New York, and raised in the Long Island suburb of Roslyn. In 2004, while he was in the seventh grade at the Roslyn Union Free School District, school superintendent Dr. Frank Tassone and various administrative colleagues were arrested in what would become the largest public school embezzlement in American history.

Makowsky attended Roslyn High School and Brown University. His first feature film as screenwriter was the independent dark comedy Take Me, produced by the Duplass brothers and distributed by Netflix. His second film, I Think We're Alone Now, starring Peter Dinklage and Elle Fanning, premiered in competition at Sundance Film Festival in 2018.

In 2016, Makowsky returned to his hometown to research the events of the Roslyn school scandal, noting that he "outlined the majority of the script out of my high school cafeteria.” The resulting film, Bad Education, starred Hugh Jackman as former Roslyn superintendent Frank Tassone, as well as Allison Janney and Ray Romano. It premiered at the 2019 Toronto International Film Festival, where HBO Films acquired it for a sum close to $20 million. The film won the Primetime Emmy Award for Outstanding Television Movie in 2020.

Both I Think We're Alone Now and Bad Education were featured on the Black List, an annual survey of popular industry scripts, in 2016. In 2019, Makowsky was recognized as one of Forbes' 30 Under 30 in the Hollywood & Entertainment category.

Makowsky most recently created Death by Lightning, a four-part miniseries about the assassination of President James Garfield, featuring Michael Shannon, Matthew Macfadyen, Nick Offerman and Betty Gilpin. The series premiered on Netflix on November 6, 2025, and received widespread acclaim.

== Filmography ==
=== Film ===
Year	Title	Writer	Producer
2017	Take Me	Yes	No
2018	I Think We're Alone Now	Yes	Yes
2019	Bad Education	Yes	Yes

=== Television ===
Year	Title	Writer	Producer	Notes
2025	Death by Lightning	Yes	Yes	4 episodes
