= Magic Hour (2025 film) =

2025 American drama film

- Theatrical release poster
- Directed by: Katie Aselton
- Written by: Katie Aselton; Mark Duplass
- Produced by: Emily Neumann
- Starring: Katie Aselton; Daveed Diggs; Brad Garrett; Susan Sullivan
- Cinematography: Sarah Wheldon
- Edited by: Stephanie Kaznocha; Kyle Boston
- Music by: Zach Dawes; Tyler Parkford
- Production company: Duplass Brothers Productions
- Distributed by: Greenwich Entertainment
- Release dates: March 7, 2025 (SXSW); May 15, 2026 (United States)
- Running time: 89 minutes
- Country: United States
- Language: English
- Box office: $24,255

Magic Hour is a 2025 American drama film, directed by Katie Aselton, from a screenplay by Aselton and Mark Duplass. It stars Aselton, Daveed Diggs, Brad Garrett, and Susan Sullivan.

It had its world premiere at South by Southwest on March 7, 2025.

== Premise ==
A couple escape to the desert to navigate their relationship.

== Cast ==
- Katie Aselton as Erin
- Daveed Diggs as Charlie
- Brad Garrett as Erin's friend
- Susan Sullivan as Erin's mother

== Production ==
In April 2024, it was announced Katie Aselton and Daveed Diggs had joined the cast of the film, with Aselton directing from a screenplay she co-wrote alongside Mark Duplass. Duplass and Jay Duplass will serve as executive producers under their Duplass Brothers Productions banner.

== Release ==
It had its world premiere at South by Southwest on March 7, 2025. In June 2025, Greenwich Entertainment acquired the film and released it on May 15, 2026.
