= Natalie Morales (actress) =

American actress (born 1985)

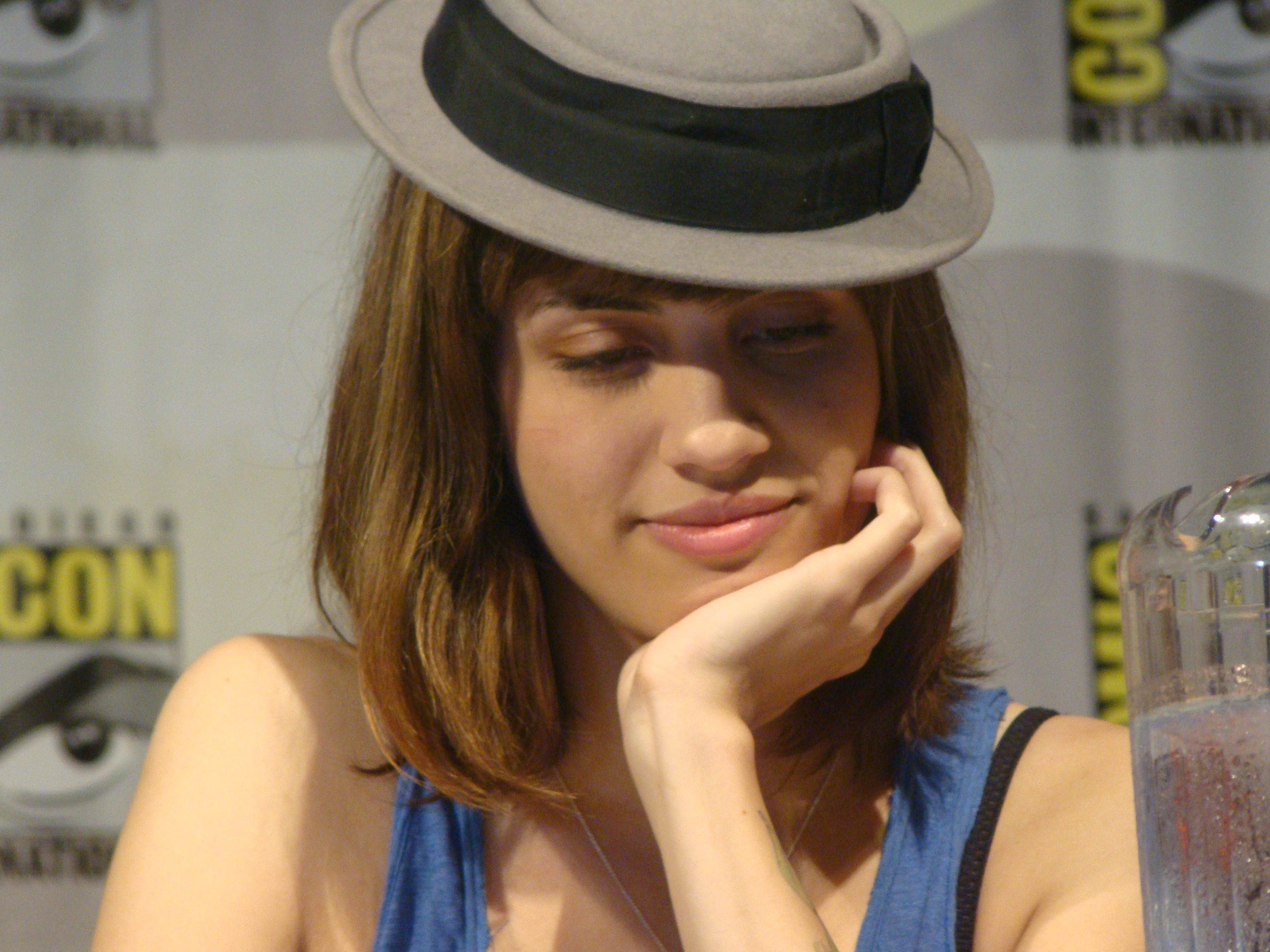
- Morales in 2009
- Born: February 15, 1985 (age 41); Miami, Florida, U.S.
- Occupations: Actress; director
- Years active: 2005–present

Natalie Morales (born February 15, 1985) is an American actress and director. She is known for her role as pediatric surgeon Dr. Monica Beltran on the ABC medical drama Grey's Anatomy (2024–25). She starred in the ABC Family series The Middleman, the ABC sitcom Trophy Wife, the Fox legal series The Grinder, the NBC sitcom Abby's, the first season of White Collar, and the Netflix miniseries The Beast in Me. Morales also had recurring roles on Parks and Recreation, Santa Clarita Diet, Dead to Me and The Morning Show.

Her directorial debut film, the teen comedy Plan B, was released May 28, 2021, on Hulu. She also directed Language Lessons, a film she co-wrote with Mark Duplass. It premiered at the Berlin International Film Festival and was released in September 2021.

== Early life ==
A native of Miami, Florida, Morales is of Cuban descent.

=== Acting ===
Morales had a guest appearance on CSI: Miami in 2006, and played a character in Pimp My Ride that year, a video game version of the MTV television series Pimp My Ride. Her first major role was in The Middleman, a sci-fi dramedy which aired on the ABC Family network for one season. She starred as Wendy Watson; the series was adapted from the comic book, The Middleman. Morales also starred in and executive produced a Web series, titled Quitters. The series was an official selection of the 3rd annual ITVFest (Independent Television Festival) in Los Angeles in August 2008.

In 2009, Morales joined the cast of the USA Network television series White Collar for the first season. She portrayed Lauren Cruz, a junior FBI agent. In May 2010, after her dismissal from the White Collar cast, Morales began recurring on the NBC sitcom Parks and Recreation, as Lucy, the girlfriend of Aziz Ansari's character Tom Haverford and bartender at The Snakehole Lounge. Morales appeared in Oliver Stone's 2010 film, Wall Street: Money Never Sleeps, a sequel to his 1987 film Wall Street. She was cast as Chelsea Handler's best friend in Are You There, Chelsea?. She left the series when the cast was replaced for creative reasons. Morales also appeared on Aaron Sorkin's HBO drama, The Newsroom, guest-starring as Kaylee, the girlfriend of Dev Patel’s character, Neal. In 2013, Morales joined the cast of Trophy Wife as Meg, Kate's best friend. In 2015, she joined the cast of the Fox series The Grinder. In 2017, she appeared in some episodes of the NBC series Powerless. Morales appeared as Detective Anne Garcia in the Netflix horror comedy series Santa Clarita Diet.

Morales was in the television series Abby's, an NBC multi-camera sitcom created by Josh Malmuth and executive produced by Parks and Recreation creator Michael Schur. Their third series for the network, it premiered on March 28, 2019. Later that year, Morales was cast as Michelle in the Netflix black comedy series Dead to Me, appearing in seasons 2 and 3.

In 2022, Morales was cast as Kate Danton in season 3 of The Morning Show. The following year, Morales was cast as pediatric surgeon Dr. Monica Beltran on Grey's Anatomy, appearing in a recurring role for two seasons. Her final appearance was in the show's season 22 premiere.

In 2025, Variety ranked Morales-led movie My Dead Friend Zoe as one of the 10 Best Movies of the year. That same year, she was part of the main cast of the miniseries The Beast in Me, portraying the estranged wife of Claire Danes's character. She was also cast as Cassie in the Amazon MGM Studios rom-com You Deserve Each Other.

=== Directing ===
In 2021, Morales directed teen comedy Plan B starring Victoria Moroles and Kuhoo Verma. The story revolves around two teens looking for the Plan B pill after a regrettable first sexual encounter. The film earned critical acclaim with critics praising Morales' direction including Linda Holmes of NPR who wrote, "The creators and the cast deserve enormous credit for how deftly the broader comedy here is balanced with genuine fear and frustration, and how unexpectedly parts of the film unfold. A lot of it is somehow structurally familiar but specifically surprising."

That same year she also directed the drama film Language Lessons (2021) which she co-wrote with writer-director Mark Duplass. They both star in the feature, which they filmed during the COVID-19 pandemic. The film is set over Zoom as a Spanish teacher (Morales) communicates with her student (Duplass). Katie Erbland, critic of IndieWire praised Morales' work on the film writing "Morales’ winning Language Lessons offers one of the best uses of the format yet, a 'Zoom film' that utilizes its constraints to craft an intimate, expressive two-hander, no fatigue in sight". The film had its debut at the 71st Berlin International Film Festival in March 2021 to positive reviews, and was released in September 2021.

== Personal life ==
In January 2010, Morales fell down approximately 20 steps at the Metropolitan Opera in New York City, landing face-first on a balcony wall. She sustained major facial injuries and underwent emergency reconstructive surgery following the accident.

On June 30, 2017, Morales stated on social media that she is queer.

== Filmography ==
=== Film ===
Year	Title	Role	Notes
2010	The Time Machine	Natalie	Short film
2010	Wall Street: Money Never Sleeps	Churchill Schwartz Trader (Laura)	
2010	Going the Distance	Brandy	
2011	6 Month Rule	Sophie	
2012	Freeloaders	Red Dot Girl	
2017	Battle of the Sexes	Rosie Casals	
2018	Spider-Man: Into the Spider-Verse	Miss Calleros (voice)	
2019	Stuber	Nicole Manning	
2021	The Little Things	Detective Jamie Estrada	
2021	Language Lessons	Cariño	Also co-writer and director
2021	Happily	Patricia	
2021	Plan B	—N/a	Director
2022	I'm Totally Fine	Jennifer	
2023	Self Reliance	Theresa	
2023	If You Were the Last	Savannah Gherrity	
2023	No Hard Feelings	Sara	
2024	My Dead Friend Zoe	Zoe	
2024	Thelma the Unicorn	Penelope Pizzaz (voice)	
2025	Summer of 69	Robin Goode	
2026	Brian	TBA	
TBA	You Deserve Each Other †	Cassie	Post-production
TBA	The Girlfriend †	—N/a	Director

Key
†	Denotes films that have not yet been released

=== Television ===
Year	Title	Role	Notes
2006	CSI: Miami	Anya Boa Vista	Episode: "Darkroom"
2008	Quitters	Natalie	Web series
2008	The Middleman	Wendy Watson	Main role, 12 episodes
2009	Boldly Going Nowhere	Ruby	TV movie
2009	Rockville CA	Isabel	Web series, episode: "Shoegazed"
2009–10	White Collar	Lauren Cruz	Main role, 9 episodes
2010	The Subpranos	Beatrice Ramirez	Web series, episode: "Gypsies, Tramps and Thieves"
2010–15	Parks and Recreation	Lucy	Recurring role, 12 episodes
2011	The Cape	Kia	Episode: "The Lich (Part 1)"
2012	The Newsroom	Kaylee	2 episodes
2012–13	90210	Ashley Howard	5 episodes
2013–14	Trophy Wife	Meg Gomez	Main role, 14 episodes
2014–15	Girls	Clementine	3 episodes
2015–16	The Grinder	Claire Lacoste	Main role, 21 episodes
2017	Grace and Frankie	Melissa	Episode: "The Musical"
2017	Powerless	Green Fury	2 episodes
2017	Crashing	Stephanie	Episode: "The Baptism"
2017	Imaginary Mary	Rebecca	Episode: "In a World Where Worlds Collide"
2017	Making History	Mona	Episode: "The Duel"
2017–19	Santa Clarita Diet	Anne Garcia	11 episodes
2017–18	BoJack Horseman	Yolanda Buenaventura, Mindy Buenaventura (voices)	4 episodes
2018	Alex, Inc.	Serena Bans	Episode: "The Rube Goldberg Contraption"
2018	Room 104	Jess	Episode: "A Nightmare"
2018	Dream Corp, LLC	Patient 6	Episode: "Woomba"
2019	Abby's	Abby	Main role, 10 episodes
2019	Sunnyside	Celeste	Episode: "Pants Full of Sandwiches"
2019–25	Harley Quinn	Lois Lane (voice)	8 episodes
2020–22	Dead to Me	Michelle Gutierrez	Recurring (seasons 2-3)
2020	Home Movie: The Princess Bride	Inigo Montoya	Episode: "Chapter Ten: To the Pain!"
2020–25	Solar Opposites	Mrs. Perez, various (voices)	14 episodes
2021–22	Mr. Mayor	Susan Alvarez-Craw	2 episodes
2021–23	Rugrats	Betty DeVille (voice)	Recurring role
2022–25	Firebuds	Val Vega-Vaughn (voice)	6 episodes
2022	The Young and the Restless	Talia Morgan	Episode #1.12500
2023	History of the World, Part II	Cavewoman	Episode: "I"
2023	The Morning Show	Kate Danton	4 episodes (season 3)
2024–25	Grey's Anatomy	Dr. Monica Beltran	Recurring (seasons 20–21); Guest (season 22); 13 episodes
2025	The Beast in Me	Shelley	Main role; 8 episodes Golden Globe Award for Best Limited or Anthology Series or, Motion Picture Made for Television — Nominated (2026)
2026	Haunted Hotel	Shayna	Recurring role (season 2)

=== Music videos ===
Year	Title	Role	Artist	Notes
2024	Penny & Me	Director	Hanson	Moonlight version

=== Video games ===
Year	Title	Role	Notes
2006	Pimp My Ride	Aiyan	Video game

== Awards and nominations ==
Awards	Year	Category	Work	Result	Ref.
Actor Awards	2021	Outstanding Performance by an Ensemble in a Comedy Series	Dead to Me	Nominated	
Berlin International Film Festival	2021	Best Feature Film	Language Lessons	Nominated	
Celebration of Cinema and Television	2021	Special Honoree Award	Herself	Won	
Daytime Emmy Awards	2024	Outstanding Talk Show Host	The Talk	Nominated	
Gotham Awards	2021	Breakthrough Performer	Language Lessons	Nominated	
Hollywood Creative Alliance Film Awards	2021	Filmmaker on the Rise Award	Language Lessons	Won	
Frameline Film Festival	2021	Best First Feature	Language Lessons	Won	
Frameline Film Festival	2021	Best First Feature Film	Language Lessons	Nominated	
Imagen Awards	2018	Best Actress	Battle of the Sexes	Nominated	
Imagen Awards	2019	Best Supporting Actress - Television	Room 104	Nominated	
Imagen Awards	2022	Best Actress	Language Lessons	Nominated	
Imagen Awards	2025	Best Actress	My Dead Friend Zoe	Nominated	
Indie Series Awards	2014	Best Guest Star (Comedy)	The Ladies & The Gents	Nominated	
Provincetown International Film Festival	2021	Next Wave Award	Herself	Won	
Provincetown International Film Festival	2021	Best Narrative Feature	Language Lessons	Won	
South by Southwest Film Festival	2021	Narrative Spotlight	Language Lessons	Won	
