= Take Me (film) =

- Theatrical release poster
- Directed by: Pat Healy
- Written by: Mike Makowsky
- Produced by: Mel Eslyn; Sev Ohanian
- Starring: Taylor Schilling; Pat Healy
- Cinematography: Nathan M. Miller
- Edited by: F. Brian Scofield
- Production company: Duplass Brothers Productions
- Distributed by: The Orchard (United States); Netflix (Note: Although Netflix co-produced and released the film outside the United States as part of a deal between the service and Duplass Brothers Productions, Take Me is not claimed to be a Netflix Original by the streaming service.) (International)
- Release dates: April 25, 2017 (Tribeca); May 5, 2017 (United States)
- Running time: 83 minutes
- Country: United States
- Language: English
- Box office: $2,583

Take Me is a 2017 American screwball comedy film directed by Pat Healy and written by Mike Makowsky. It stars Healy opposite Taylor Schilling, along with Alycia Delmore and Jim O'Heir.

The film had its world premiere at the Tribeca Film Festival on April 25, 2017. It was released on May 5, 2017, by The Orchard.

== Plot ==
Entrepreneur Ray Moody runs a business in which clients pay him to experience a simulated kidnapping. An interview for a loan goes poorly when he attempts to explain his business model to an incredulous banker. Although Ray has a strained relationship with his sister Natalie, he turns to her husband Tom for the money.

Stuart, an overeater, has contracted Ray to stage an aggressive intervention over eight hours. Ray tells Stuart he cheats on his diet, and then forces him to consume a dozen of his favorite hamburgers. After the eight-hour session ends, Stuart thanks Ray and asserts that he has lost his appetite for hamburgers.

Ray is elated when a new client, Anna, contacts him, seeking an extended session that will last the entire weekend. His joy turns to scepticism when Anna requests that he hit her. Although initially refusing the job, Ray calls her back and accepts. Ray then performs surveillance on her, and she leaves him a message telling him to be more discreet.

Ray simulates a carjacking, taking her hostage that weekend, never breaking character. He forces himself to take a break to reassure himself that he has the confidence and skill to pull off the scenario. Ray then aggressively interrogates Anna about a made-up client, demanding access to non-existent files.

Although initially scared and obedient, Anna soon adopts a mocking tone, accusing him of being a pervert who has abducted her under flimsy premises. Enraged, he almost strikes her, and she again mocks him for his reluctance.

After hitting her, Ray leaves to pay Tom back. Natalie discovers the envelope filled with money and surmises its purpose, angry that her husband would finance Ray's bizarre business. She confronts Ray and realizes he is using their parents' house for his scenarios; he becomes frustrated when she interrupts his session. After she leaves, Ray hears on the news the police are investigating Anna's disappearance. Rattled, he attempts to talk to Anna, who stabs him in the back with an improvised weapon.

The police show up at Ray's house. Panicking, he binds Anna in the basement as he deflects the police officers' questions. After bandaging himself, he attempts to clear up everything with Anna, who claims to have no knowledge of his business. Ray shows her the contract she digitally signed and plays back her earlier phone message, both of which she dismisses as fabrications.

Confused and fearing he has wrongly kidnapped someone, Ray agrees to let her go. However, at the last moment, he swallows her car keys, saying that he can not release her until they create an alibi that allows him – and Natalie – to escape jail time. After Anna shoots him several times with his pellet gun, Ray attempts to regurgitate the keys, only for her to slip and fall unconscious.

When Anna wakes, she is in her car being driven by Ray and he asks her to cooperate. She punches him instead then Ray put her in the trunk for the rest of the journey to his remote vacation home. There, they discuss their pasts, both revealing that they are divorced. Ray says his ex-wife, who co-founded the business, accused him of criminal wrongdoing. Anna agrees not to go to the police, but asks him to explain more details about what she accused him of doing. She suggests he gets off on violence and power, so he chokes her in response. Anna knocks him unconscious with a fire poker. Armed with Tom's rifle, Anna takes Ray hostage, threatening to shoot him unless he submits to riding in her car's trunk.

At the end of the ride back to the city, Anna happily thanks him for the experience and offers to invest in his business, revealing to the audience and Ray that she was indeed a willing participant the whole time. Stunned, he can only mumble a response before he stumbles back home to see Stuart in a restaurant. As he waves at him, Ray cries, then laughs when he sees Stuart is really eating a salad.

== Cast ==
- Pat Healy as Ray Moody
- Taylor Schilling as Anna St. Blair
- Alycia Delmore as Natalie
- Jim O'Heir as Stuart
- Brooke Dillman as Cathy
- Toby Huss as Officer Judkins
- Alejandro Patiño as Officer Ramirez
- Mark Kelly as Tom

== Production ==
Mike Makowsky wrote the role of Ray Moody with Pat Healy in mind. Healy brought the script to producers Jay Duplass and Mark Duplass, who agreed to finance and co-produce alongside The Orchard and Netflix. Production took place in Glendale, California and Crestline, California over the course of eighteen days.

== Release ==
The film had its world premiere at the Tribeca Film Festival on April 25, 2017. Prior to Tribeca, The Orchard acquired distribution rights to the film and set it for a May 5, 2017 release.

=== Critical reception ===
Take Me holds a 70% approval rating on review aggregator website Rotten Tomatoes, based on 23 reviews, with a weighted average of 6.7/10. On Metacritic, the film holds a rating of 56 out of 100 based on 10 critics, indicating "mixed or average reviews".

Sheila O'Malley of RogerEbert.com rated the film 3 1/2 out of 4 stars, praising the actors' on-screen chemistry and "an extremely funny script by Mike Makowsky." Nick Schager of Variety also gave the film a positive review, determining its ability to "exploit its screwy premise for both unnerving laughs and volatile thrills." John DeFore of The Hollywood Reporter highlighted Healy's direction in particular, citing it as "exactly the mix of comical bumbling and psychological tension he wants here, executing the premise in a way sure to please fans of his distinctive body of work... and impress a few new ones along the way."

Neil Genzlinger's review in The New York Times was more tepid, claiming that "parts of it work, but the overall package is never really suspenseful enough to have you on edge or overtly funny enough to be a lark."
