= Duplass brothers =

The Duplass brothers are:

- Mark Duplass (born 1976), American filmmaker, actor, writer, and musician
- Jay Duplass (born 1973), American film director, author, and actor

== See also ==
- Duplass Brothers Productions, their production company
