= Rainbow Time =

- Theatrical release poster
- Directed by: Linas Phillips
- Written by: Linas Phillips
- Produced by: Ian Michaels; Linas Phillips
- Starring: Linas Phillips; Melanie Lynskey; Timm Sharp; Tobin Bell; Jay Duplass; Lauren Weedman; Jennifer Prediger; Artemis Pebdani
- Cinematography: Nathan M. Miller
- Edited by: Libby Cuenin; Nathan Whiteside
- Music by: Heather McIntosh
- Production company: Duplass Brothers Productions
- Distributed by: The Orchard
- Release dates: March 13, 2016 (SXSW); November 4, 2016 (United States)
- Running time: 91 minutes
- Country: United States
- Language: English

Melanie Lynskey discussing Rainbow Time in 2016

Rainbow Time is a 2016 American comedy-drama film written and directed by Linas Phillips. The film stars Phillips, Melanie Lynskey, Timm Sharp, Tobin Bell, Jay Duplass, Lauren Weedman and Artemis Pebdani. Mark Duplass, and Jay Duplass serve as executive producers on the film, through their Duplass Brothers Productions banner.

The film had its world premiere at South by Southwest on March 13, 2016. The film was released in a limited release and through video on demand November 4, 2016, by The Orchard.

== Plot ==
Shonzi, a developmentally delayed 40 year-old, is sent to live with his brother, Todd. While living with his brother, he develops a crush on Todd's girlfriend, Lindsay.

== Cast ==
- Linas Phillips as Shonzi
- Timm Sharp as Todd
- Tobin Bell as Peter
- Melanie Lynskey as Lindsay
- Jay Duplass as Adam
- Artemis Pebdani as Justine
- Jennifer Prediger as Sarah
- Lauren Weedman as Nina
- Robert Longstreet as Jake's Dad
- Sarah Smick as Jen
- Reagan Yates as Lily
- Samantha Buchanan as Sam

== Production ==
The film was first announced in 2010, originally about man named Rimas making a TV show called "Rainbow Time". In July 2014, Phillips uploaded on his Vimeo.com account rehearsal for the film. In March 2015, Phillips revealed the project would be his next film with production eyed for June–July of that same year. In February 2016, it was revealed that Heather McIntosh had composed the score for the film.

=== Filming ===
Production on the film began on September 22, 2015, and concluded on October 9, 2015, lasting a total of 13 days.

== Release ==
The film had its world premiere on March 13, 2016, at South by Southwest. Shortly after, The Orchard acquired worldwide distribution rights to the film. The film also screened at the Seattle International Film Festival on May 20, 2016. The film was released on November 4, 2016.

=== Critical response ===
Rainbow Time received mixed reviews from film critics. Review aggregator Rotten Tomatoes gave the film a 67% approval rating, based on 15 reviews, with an average rating of 6.62/10. On Metacritic, the film holds a rating of 55 out of 100, based on 9 critics, indicating "mixed or average reviews".

In a two-star review for RogerEbert.com, Nick Allen described the film as "unusual" for being "less politically correct, and kinkier, than any movie that might even be comparable." However, Allen felt that it failed to "become the strong feminist statement it ultimately wants to be", and suffered for being "more original than it is clever".

In The New York Times, Jeannette Catsoulis praised the film for being "funny and even perceptive about the nooks and crannies of adult sexual relationships", and considered it to be "very well-acted", particularly by Melanie Lynskey. But Catsoulis criticized the character of Shonzi, finding him to be "creepily calculating and fully capable of controlling his objectionable conduct."

Reviewing the film for Spectrum Culture, Rose Kerr also praised Melanie Lynskey's performance, finding her to be "the best actor here", stating that "her character keeps the film grounded in the idea of relationships as balancing acts." However, Kerr concluded that "[d]evelopmental disabilities aren’t explored with any depth", and that the film treats them merely as a "fulcrum of...gross-out humor."
