= Last Stop Larrimah =

- Official poster
- Directed by: Thomas Tancred
- Produced by: Sean Bradley; Rebecca Saunders
- Cinematography: Jesse Gohier-Fleet
- Edited by: Nicholas Alden; Christopher Donlon; Michael X. Flores; Jody McVeigh-Shultz; Thomas Tancred
- Production companies: HBO Documentary Films; Duplass Brothers Productions
- Distributed by: HBO
- Release dates: March 11, 2023 (SXSW); October 8, 2023 (United States)
- Running time: 117 minutes: Part 1: 51 minutes; Part 2: 68 minutes
- Country: United States
- Language: English

Last Stop Larrimah is a 2023 American documentary film directed and edited by Thomas Tancred. It follows the disappearance of Paddy Moriarty, a resident in Larrimah, Northern Territory, Australia, with the rest of the residents becoming suspects. Mark Duplass and Jay Duplass serve as executive producers under their Duplass Brothers Productions banner.

It had its world premiere at South by Southwest on March 11, 2023, and was released on October 8, 2023, by HBO.

== Premise ==
Paddy Moriarty and his dog disappear in Larrimah, Northern Territory, Australia. The remaining residents become suspects in an investigation.

== Release ==
The film had its world premiere at South by Southwest on March 11, 2023. It was released on October 8, 2023, by HBO.

== Reception ==
On the review aggregator website Rotten Tomatoes, 86% of 22 critics' reviews are positive, with an average rating of 7.6/10. The website's consensus reads: "Take the train down under all the way to its Last Stop Larrimah -- this is one wacky true crime ride." Metacritic, which uses a weighted average, assigned the film a score of 70 out of 100, based on 9 critics, indicating "generally favorable" reviews.
