= Language Lessons =

American drama film directed and written by Natalie Morales

- Theatrical release poster
- Directed by: Natalie Morales
- Written by: Natalie Morales; Mark Duplass
- Produced by: Mel Eslyn
- Starring: Mark Duplass; Natalie Morales; Desean Terry
- Cinematography: Jeremy Mackie
- Edited by: Aleshka Ferreno
- Music by: Gaby Moreno
- Production company: Duplass Brothers Productions
- Distributed by: Shout! Studios
- Release dates: March 1, 2021 (Berlinale); September 10, 2021 (United States)
- Running time: 91 minutes
- Country: United States
- Languages: English; Spanish
- Box office: $73,257

Language Lessons is a 2021 American screenlife drama film directed by Natalie Morales (in her directorial debut) and written by Morales and Mark Duplass. The film stars Morales, Duplass and Desean Terry.

The film follows the unexpected friendship that develops between Adam, a man whose husband surprises him with online Spanish lessons, and his teacher, Cariño.

The film had its worldwide premiere at the 71st Berlin International Film Festival on March 1, 2021. It was released on September 10, 2021, by Shout! Studios.

== Plot ==
Spanish instructor Cariño logs on for an online lesson with a student and is surprised to discover her student, Adam, was unaware of the lesson. To their surprise they learn that Adam's husband Will, who was raised in various countries in Latin America, purchased the lesson as a surprise to help him brush up on his Spanish.

Adam is further surprised to learn that Will signed him up for 100 lessons. Despite some awkwardness, he goes along with the lesson. Cariño learns that, through his marriage to Will, Adam is extremely wealthy. He decides to continue with the lessons, promising to return in a week.

Cariño logs on for their second lesson and finds Adam still in bed. He reveals that Will died the night before, having been hit by a car while jogging; Adam has not told anyone else about what happened. When Adam begins to panic Cariño helps to calm him down by showing him the gardens near where she lives, eventually lulling him to sleep. Cariño continues to reach out, sending video messages and offering a homework assignment and self-care tips. At first, Adam declines the assignment as he is still in grief but gradually he takes it up and resolves to continue learning.

For their third lesson, Cariño’s video appears not to be working due to poor Internet reception. They chat about Will’s passing and Adam reveals that, prior to their relationship, he had been married to a woman and in denial about being gay. During their discussion, Cariño accidentally turns her camera on, revealing her badly bruised face. She claims the bruises came from falling off her bike and becomes offended when Adam offers to buy her a new one. He later records a message, apologizing for making her uncomfortable but also revealing that he knows her bike story is a lie.

At the start of their fourth lesson, Adam asks how Cariño is doing, but she gets straight into the lesson, wanting to work on his grammar. Adam prefers that they talk candidly as they have in the past, but Cariño insists, wanting to maintain a professional relationship. He asks why she didn’t respond to his earlier messages, and she defensively replies that she just forgot to.

Adam later gets a call from a drunken Cariño at 2:30 AM; she plays him guitar and sings him happy birthday. He asks how she knew it was his birthday, and she admits she stalked his social media as she wanted to know more about him. As they talk, Cariño reveals that she isn’t actually certified to teach Spanish and is recently divorced. The next morning, Cariño records a message apologizing for the late call and canceling their future lessons as she is dealing with personal issues; however, she deletes it without sending it.

During their next call, Cariño again tries to maintain a professional distance, but he presses her, asking directly if her ex-husband beat her and offering to help. After Adam tells Cariño he loves her, she mocks him for making assumptions about her personal life. She tells him that she hasn't seen her ex in years and the bruises came from a bar fight. Still sensing there is something wrong, Adam asks Cariño what is happening with her. She reveals she suspects she has cancer as she found a lump and both her mother and maternal grandmother died of the disease. Adam offers to support her, but Cariño says it would be best if they ceased all contact and logs off.

Adam sends Cariño a video message, offering to fly her to Oakland and help her with medical bills. If she doesn’t want to, he still thanks her for her friendship and helping him through Will’s death. He sends another message later, apologizing if he offended her and admitting he misses her and just wants to talk. As he records the message, Cariño appears behind him, suitcases in hand, having decided to accept his offer; they meet for the first time in person and embrace.

== Cast ==
The cast include:

- Natalie Morales as Cariño
- Mark Duplass as Adam
- Desean Terry as Will
- Christine Quesada

== Production ==
The film was developed and shot entirely while Natalie Morales and Mark Duplass were in lockdown during the COVID-19 pandemic. Duplass had worked with Natalie Morales on the TV series Room 104 and suggested they collaborate on an idea he had about a Spanish teacher and a man taking lessons from her.

== Release ==
The film had its world premiere at the 71st Berlin International Film Festival in the Berlinale Special section on March 1, 2021. It also screened at South by Southwest on March 17, 2021. Shortly after, Shout! Studios acquired U.S. distribution rights to the film. It was released on September 10, 2021.

== Reception ==
Language Lessons holds a 96% approval rating on review aggregator website Rotten Tomatoes, based on 97 reviews, with a weighted average of 7.50/10. The site's critics consensus reads: "Language Lessons extols the value of friendship with a simple story rendered all the more effective by its pure spirit and the chemistry between its leads." Metacritic, another aggregator, sampled ten critics and calculated a weighted average score of 68 out of 100, indicating "generally favorable" reviews.
