= The Puffy Chair =

American independent film made in 2005

- Directed by: Jay Duplass; Mark Duplass (uncredited)
- Written by: Mark Duplass; Jay Duplass
- Produced by: Mark Duplass; Jay Duplass (uncredited)
- Starring: Mark Duplass; Katie Aselton; Rhett Wilkins
- Production company: Duplass Brothers Productions
- Distributed by: Roadside Attractions; Netflix
- Release dates: January 18, 2005 (Sundance); June 2, 2006 (United States)
- Running time: 85 minutes
- Country: United States
- Language: English
- Budget: $15,000
- Box office: $194,523

The Puffy Chair is a 2005 American mumblecore road film written and directed by Jay and Mark Duplass. It stars Mark Duplass, Katie Aselton and Rhett Wilkins. The film had its world premiere at the Sundance Film Festival in January 2005, and went on to screen at South by Southwest in March 2005, winning the Audience Award. The film was released on June 2, 2006, by Netflix and Roadside Attractions.

== Plot ==
The film concerns the relationships between men, women, brothers, mothers, fathers, and friends. The protagonist discovers on eBay a replica of a lounge chair that was used by his father long ago. The resulting road trip to pick up and deliver the chair as a birthday present for the father in Atlanta takes interesting twists.

== Cast ==
- Mark Duplass as Josh
- Katie Aselton as Emily
- Rhett Wilkins as Rhett
- Julie Fischer as Amber
- Larry Duplass as Josh's Dad
- Cindy Duplass as Josh's Mom
- Jim Whalen as Doctor

== Production ==
The film was made for $15,000, money borrowed from the Duplass's parents. All of the film's actors were paid $100 a day, with extensive improvisation used. It was shot on a Panasonic AG-DVX100.

The scenes set in North Carolina were actually filmed in the small town of Milbridge, Maine, hometown of Katie Aselton; in fact, the filmmakers stayed with Aselton's parents during production.

== Release ==
The film had its world premiere at the Sundance Film Festival in January 2005. Shortly after, Netflix and Roadside Attractions acquired distribution rights to the film. The film went on to screen at South by Southwest on March 11, 2005, where it won the festival's Audience Award. The film was released in a limited release on June 2, 2006.

== Critical reception ==
The Puffy Chair received positive reviews from film critics. It holds a 77% approval rating on review aggregator website Rotten Tomatoes, based on 52 reviews, with an average rating of 6.78/10. The critical consensus reads: "First-timer Duplass offers a realistic and thoughtful romantic comedy." On Metacritic, the film holds a rating of 73 out of 100 based on 17 critics, indicating "Generally favorable reviews".

Scott Founders of Variety gave the film a positive review writing : "The delicate art of reupholstery, as it applies to furniture and human relationships, gives weight to the comic machinations of “The Puffy Chair,” the smart and painfully funny debut feature by filmmaker brothers Jay and Mark Duplass. [It] is an unusually human comedy of manners that, even when it falters, feels like a breath of fresh air pumped into an asphyxiating genre. Warm Sundance reception suggests dirt-cheap pic could develop a strong word-of-mouth following, particularly among college auds(sic)." Nick Schager of SlantMagazine.com gave the film 2.5/4 writing : "the film never quite strikes a comfortable or graceful balance between silliness and solemnity, so that when the informal story eventually transforms into a sobering portrait of a crumbling relationship, the effect—compounded by the often-unlikable self-involvement of its characters—is more off-putting than appealing."
