= Katie Aselton =

American actress (born 1978)

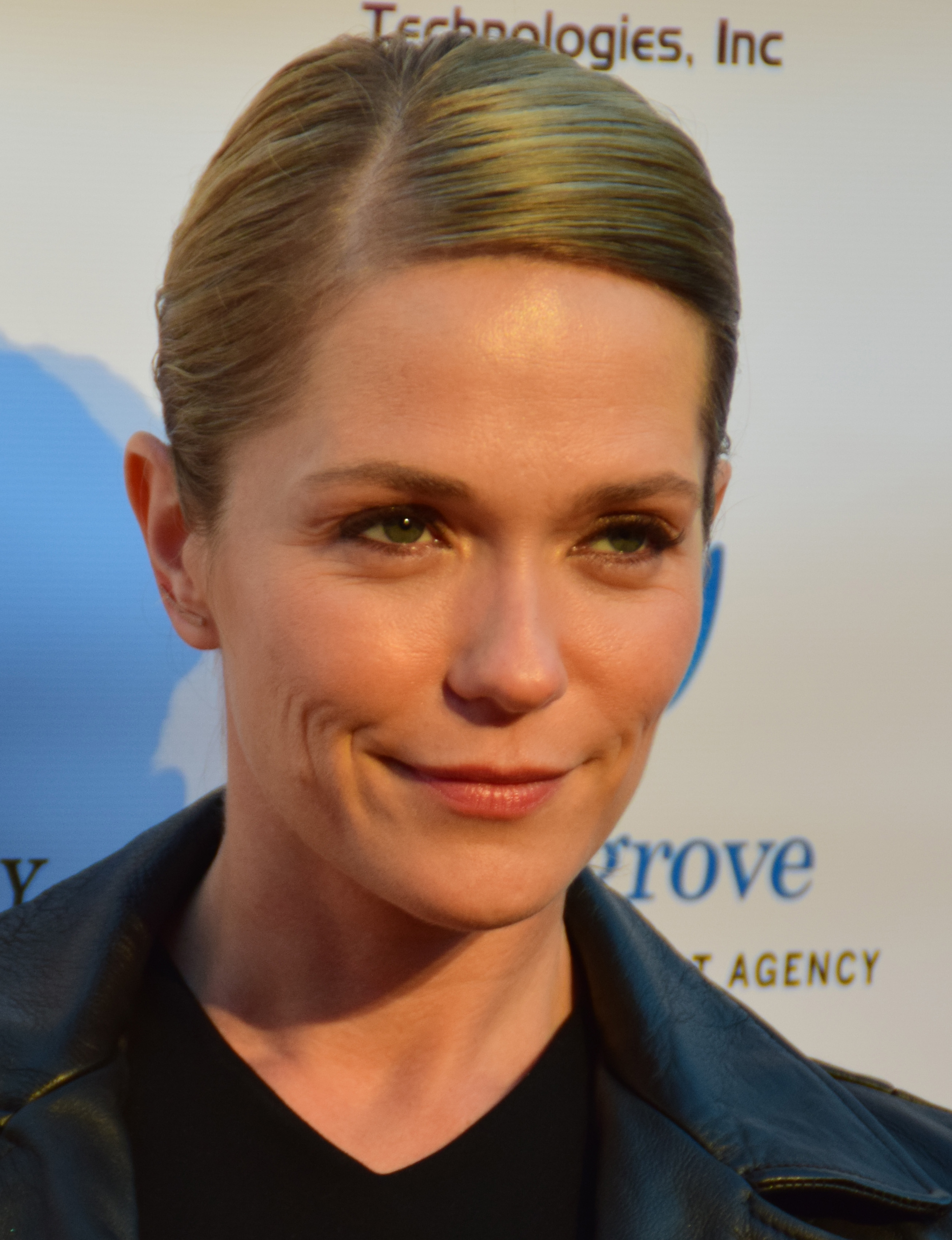
- Aselton in 2015
- Born: Kathryn Aselton; October 1, 1978 (age 47); Milbridge, Maine, U.S.
- Education: Boston University; American Academy of Dramatic Arts
- Occupation: Actress
- Years active: 2001–present
- Spouse: Mark Duplass (m. 2006)
- Children: 2
- Relatives: Jay Duplass (brother-in-law)

Kathryn Aselton (born October 1, 1978) is an American actress. She directed and co-starred in The Freebie, which was shown in the non-competition "Next" category at the Sundance Film Festival in 2010. Her other films as writer-director include the feminist thriller Black Rock, which premiered at Sundance in 2012; and the relationship drama Magic Hour, which premiered at South by Southwest in 2025. She also directed Mack & Rita (2022) and Their Town (2026), neither of which she wrote.

She also starred in the FX sitcom The League for its seven-season run from 2009 to 2015, and in the first two seasons of FX's drama Legion.

== Early life ==
Aselton was born in Milbridge, Maine. She competed in pageants in 1995, and was Miss Maine Teen USA 1995 and first runner-up at Miss Teen USA 1995. She graduated from Narraguagus High School in Harrington, Maine, in 1996. She attended Boston University School of Communications for two years before moving to Los Angeles to act, where she met her future husband, Mark Duplass. She then studied for two years at the American Academy of Dramatic Arts in New York.

== Career ==
In 2004, Aselton appeared in a short film titled Scrapple opposite Mark Duplass and his brother Jay Duplass who also wrote and directed the short. Aselton made her feature-length film debut in The Puffy Chair opposite Mark Duplass, who directed the film alongside his brother Jay. The film premiered at Sundance in January 2005 and was released on June 2, 2006, in a limited release. That same year, Aselton appeared opposite Steve Zissis in the short film "The Intervention". In 2009, after a break from acting, Aselton appeared in an episode of The Office. That same year, she appeared in Easier with Practice, "Other People's Parties", and "Feed the Fish". In 2016, Aselton appeared in Togetherness, an HBO original series created by her husband and her brother in law, as Anna. That same year, she was cast in a recurring role in the second season of Casual as Jennifer. Aselton also starred in Fun Mom Dinner opposite Molly Shannon and Toni Collette, directed by Alethea Jones. She was featured in an episode of Season 9 of Curb Your Enthusiasm as Jean the USPS Letter Carrier.

== Personal life ==
Aselton is married to her The League co-star Mark Duplass. They have two daughters together, born in 2007 and 2012.

== Filmography ==
=== Film ===
Year	Title	Role	Notes
2004	Scrapple	Amy	Short film
2005	The Puffy Chair	Emily	
2005	The Intervention	Unknown	Short film
2005	Geek Like Me	Short film	
2009	Easier with Practice	Nicole	
2009	Other People's Parties	Maggie Rihneau	
2009	Feed the Fish	Sif Anderson	
2010	Cyrus	Pretty Girl	
2010	The Freebie	Annie	Also writer and director
2011	Our Idiot Brother	Amy	
2011	The Fickle	Jessie	Short film
2011	Jeff, Who Lives at Home	Hostess	
2011	Treatment	Vivienne	
2012	Black Rock	Abby	Also writer and director
2014	Creep	Angela (voice)	Uncredited
2015	The Sea of Trees	Gabriella Laforte	
2015	The Gift	Joan Callem	
2017	Fun Mom Dinner	Emily	
2017	Father Figures	Sarah O'Callaghan	
2018	Book Club	Adrianne	
2018	Deep Murder	Babs Dangler	
2019	The Tomorrow Man	Janet	
2019	The Devil Has a Name	Olive Gore	
2019	Synchronic	Tara Dannelly	
2019	Bombshell	Alicia	
2020	She Dies Tomorrow	Susan	
2021	Silk Road	Sandy Bowden	
2021	The Unholy	Natalie Gates	
2022	Mack & Rita	—N/a	Director
2023	Old Dads	Leah Kelly	
2025	Magic Hour		Also director and writer

=== Television ===
Year	Title	Role	Notes
2001	Undressed	Kim	2 episodes
2009	The Office	Glove Girl	Episode: "Blood Drive"
2009–2015	The League	Jenny	Main role, 82 episodes
2010	Players	Ken's Date	1 episodes
2013	Burning Love	Idina Blimperson	1 episode
2013	Newsreaders	Monica Collander	1 episode
2014	Revolution	Duncan Page	2 episodes
2014	Wedlock	Candace	2 episodes
2015	Weird Loners	April	1 episode
2016	Animals.	Rebecca / Mom (voice)	4 episodes
2016	Togetherness	Anna	3 episodes
2016	Casual	Jennifer	Recurring role (season 2)
2017–2018	Legion	Amy	Main role (season 1), Recurring role (season 2)
2017	Curb Your Enthusiasm	Jean	Episode: "Thank You for Your Service"
2019	Veep	Stephanie	Episode: "Pledge"
2021	The Morning Show	Madeleine, Chip's fiancée	Recurring role (season 2)
2025	The Creep Tapes	Angela	Guest Star, 1 episode: "Angela"
2026	Life, Larry and the Pursuit of Unhappiness	Sylvia	Episode: "Deepthroat"
