= The Devil Has a Name =

American film

- Theatrical release poster
- Directed by: Edward James Olmos
- Written by: Robert McEveety
- Produced by: Edward James Olmos; Robert McEveety; Patrick Hibler; Stephen McEveety
- Starring: David Strathairn; Kate Bosworth; Pablo Schreiber; Edward James Olmos; Katie Aselton; Haley Joel Osment; Alfred Molina; Martin Sheen
- Cinematography: Reynaldo Villalobos
- Edited by: Robert K. Lambert
- Music by: Ariel Marx; Mark Tschanz
- Production companies: Four Horsemen; StoryBoard Media
- Distributed by: Momentum Pictures
- Release dates: August 4, 2019 (LALIFF); October 16, 2020 (United States)
- Running time: 97 minutes
- Country: United States
- Language: English
- Budget: $7.2 million

The Devil Has a Name is a 2019 American dark comedy film starring and directed by Edward James Olmos. It also stars David Strathairn, Kate Bosworth, Pablo Schreiber, Katie Aselton, Haley Joel Osment, Alfred Molina, and Martin Sheen. The film premiered at the 2019 Los Angeles Latino International Film Festival. It was then released in the United States in selected theaters, through video on demand, and on digital platforms on October 16, 2020, by Momentum Pictures.

== Plot ==
It is a fictionalized drama of true events surrounding California's Central Valley water contamination wars.

== Cast ==
- David Strathairn as Fred Stern, a stubborn farmer whose farm gets poisoned by Gigi's company
- Edward James Olmos as Santiago, a Mexican immigrant and Fred's confidant
- Alfred Molina as Big Boss, a psychopathic CEO who wants to bring Gigi down
- Kate Bosworth as Gigi Cutler, an arrogant regional director of Shore Oil and Gas
- Martin Sheen as Ralph Wegis, an environmental lawyer who takes Fred's case
- Haley Joel Osment as Alex Gardner, a failing advertising agent who's recruited by Gigi
- Pablo Schreiber as Ezekiel, an ambitious yet cruel pyromaniac
- Katie Aselton as Olive Gore, Shore's high-powered, alcoholic lawyer
- Michael Hogan as Judge, known to Gigi as "Lance"

== Filming ==
Principal photography started in Los Angeles in February 2018.
