= Mark Duplass =

American actor and director (born 1976)

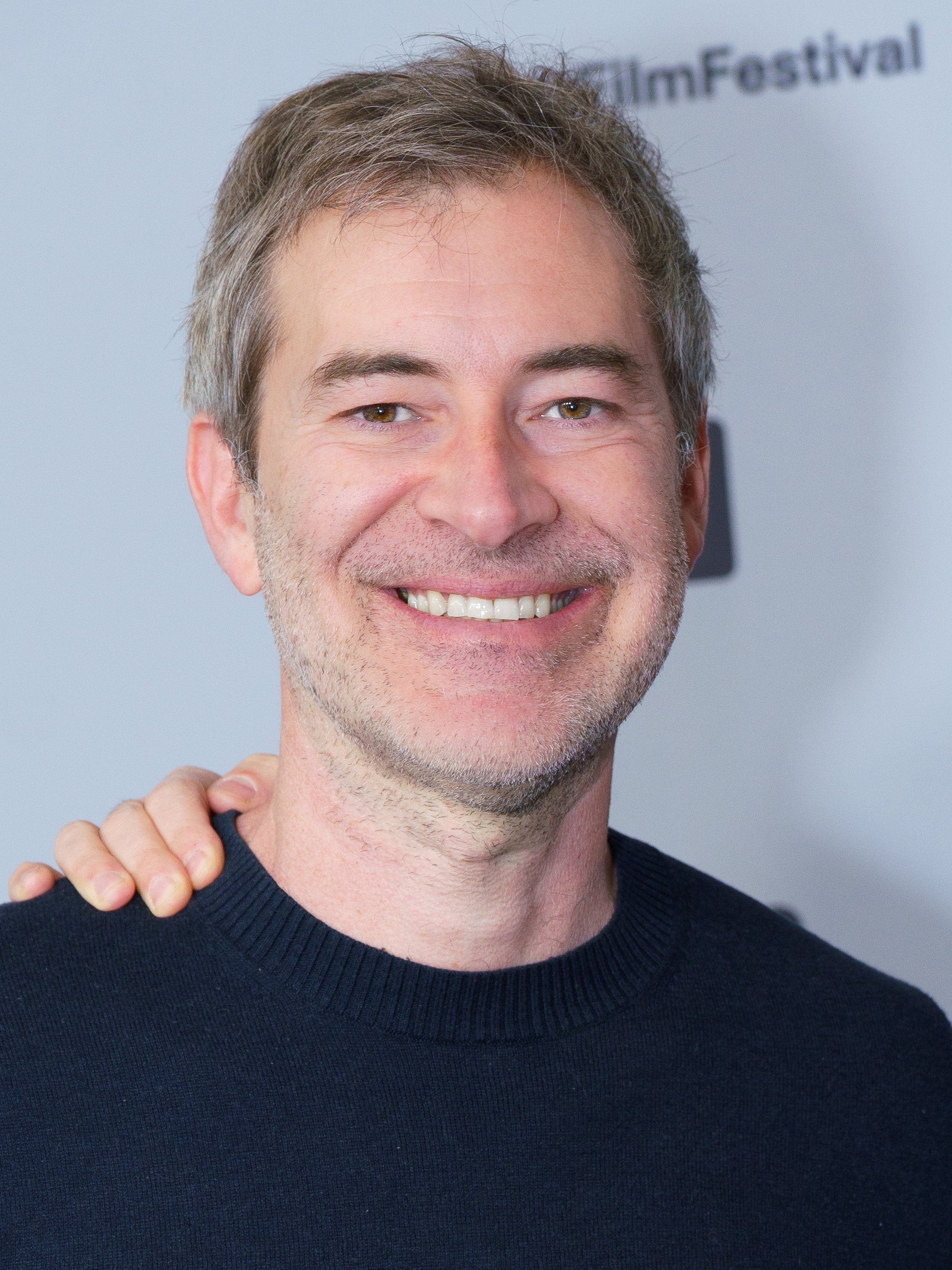
- Duplass in 2026
- Born: Mark David Duplass; December 7, 1976 (age 49); New Orleans, Louisiana, U.S.
- Education: University of Texas at Austin; City College of New York
- Occupations: Filmmaker; actor; musician; writer
- Years active: 1996–present
- Organization: Duplass Brothers Productions
- Spouse: Katie Aselton (m. 2006)
- Children: 2
- Relatives: Jay Duplass (brother)

Mark David Duplass (born December 7, 1976) is an American filmmaker and actor. With his brother Jay Duplass, he started the production company Duplass Brothers Productions in 1996, for which they wrote and directed the films The Puffy Chair (2005), Baghead (2008), Cyrus (2010), Jeff, Who Lives at Home (2011), and The Do-Deca-Pentathlon (2012), as well as the television series Togetherness (2015–2016) and Room 104 (2017–2020).

Duplass' acting credits include Humpday (2009), The League (2009–2015), Greenberg (2010), Safety Not Guaranteed (2012), The One I Love (2014), The Lazarus Effect (2015), Togetherness (2015–2016), Blue Jay (2016), Tully (2018), Goliath (2018–2019), Paddleton (2019), Language Lessons (2021), and Backrooms (2026). He co-wrote and starred in the horror film Creep (2014) and its sequel Creep 2 (2017), as well as the television spin-off The Creep Tapes (2024–present). For his portrayal of Charlie "Chip" Black in The Morning Show (2019–present), Duplass received two nominations for the Primetime Emmy Award for Outstanding Supporting Actor in a Drama Series.

== Early life ==
Duplass was born on December 7, 1976, in New Orleans, Louisiana, to Cynthia (née Ernst) and Lawrence Duplass. He was raised Catholic, and attended Jesuit High School, University of Texas at Austin, and City College of New York. His ancestry includes Cajun, Italian, Ashkenazi Jewish, and German roots.

== Career ==
Duplass has written, directed, and produced several feature films with his brother Jay Duplass. In 2005, he wrote and produced The Puffy Chair with his brother, in addition to portraying one of the main characters.

The two brothers later wrote, directed, and produced the films Baghead (2008) and Cyrus (2010) together and have a unique style which consists of a great deal of ad-libbing off of the original script, shooting a number of takes, and editing scenes down 15 to 20 times. Their films Jeff, Who Lives at Home and The Do-Deca-Pentathlon were released in 2012. In 2014, Duplass co-wrote, produced and starred in the horror film Creep alongside Patrick Brice, appearing in the film as Josef. In May 2016, it was announced that there would be a sequel to Creep. Creep 2 was released in October 2017 which Duplass again co-wrote and starred in.

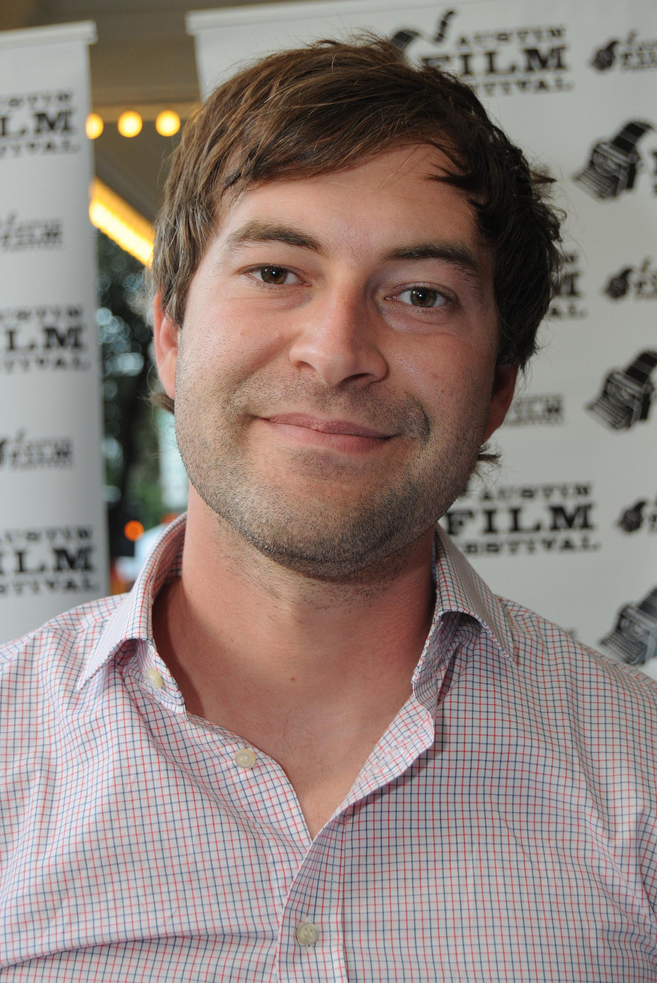
Duplass in 2011

In 2009, Duplass starred in the FX comedy television series The League, with his wife, Katie Aselton. In 2015, the HBO series Togetherness debuted, which was created by and stars Duplass. That same year, Duplass co-starred with Evan Peters and Olivia Wilde in David Gelb's thriller film The Lazarus Effect. In 2015, both Mark and Jay Duplass via their Duplass Brothers Television banner signed a two-year overall deal with HBO.

In 2018, he appeared in Tully and Duck Butter, and released his debut book Like Brothers alongside Jay Duplass. He also starred as real estate developer Tom Wyatt in Season 2 of the Amazon Video series Goliath.

In 2019, Duplass starred in the Netflix comedy film, Paddleton, in which he was also a co-writer and executive producer.

Duplass was named the 2022-2023 Frank Sinatra Artist-in-Residence at Santa Clara University on July 22, 2022.

== Other ventures ==
Duplass was the lead singer of the indie rock band Volcano, I'm Still Excited!! He also co-wrote the autobiographical book Like Brothers in 2018 with his brother Jay Duplass.

== Personal life ==
Duplass is married to his The League and The Puffy Chair co-star, Katie Aselton. They have two daughters, Ora (b. 2007) and Molly (b. 2012).

== Filmography ==
=== Feature film ===
Year	Title	Director	Writer	Producer
2005	The Puffy Chair	Uncredited	Yes	Yes
2008	Baghead	Yes	Yes	Yes
2010	Cyrus	Yes	Yes	No
2011	Jeff, Who Lives at Home	Yes	Yes	No
2012	The Do-Deca-Pentathlon	Yes	Yes	Yes
2012	Black Rock	No	Yes	Executive
2014	Creep	No	Yes	Yes
2016	Blue Jay	No	Yes	No
2017	Table 19	No	Story	No
2017	Creep 2	No	Yes	No
2018	Unlovable	No	Yes	Executive
2019	Paddleton	No	Yes	Executive
2021	Language Lessons	No	Yes	Executive
2022	Biosphere	No	Yes	Executive
2025	Magic Hour	No	Yes	Executive

Executive producer only

- Bass Ackwards (2010)
- The Freebie (2010)
- Lovers of Hate (2012)
- Your Sister's Sister (2012)
- Safety Not Guaranteed (2012)
- Bad Milo (2013)
- The One I Love (2014)
- The Skeleton Twins (2014)
- Adult Beginners (2014)
- The Lazarus Effect (2015)
- The Bronze (2015)
- Tangerine (2015)
- 6 Years (2015)
- Manson Family Vacation (2015)
- Asperger's Are Us (2016) (Documentary)
- Take Me (2017)
- Outside In (2017)
- Duck Butter (2018)
- The MisEducation of Bindu (2019)
- Horse Girl (2020)
- Young Hearts (2020)
- As of Yet (2021)
- Not Going Quietly (2021) (Documentary)
- Drought (2021)
- 7 Days (2021)
- Last Stop Larrimah (2023) (Documentary)
- Jazzy (2024)

=== Short film ===
Year	Title	Director	Producer	Writer	Notes
1996	Connect 5	No	Yes	No	
2002	The New Brad	No	Yes	Yes	
2003	This Is John	Yes	Yes	Yes	
2004	Scrapple	Yes	Yes	Yes	
2005	The Intervention	No	Yes	Yes	
2011	Kevin	No	Yes	No	Documentary short
2020	The Ride	No	Executive	No	

=== Television ===
Year	Title	Director	Executive Producer	Writer	Creator	Notes
2014	Wedlock	No	Yes	No	No	
2015–2016	Togetherness	Yes	Yes	Yes	Yes	Wrote 16 episodes, directed 15 episodes
2016–2018	Animals	No	Yes	No	No	
2017–2020	Room 104	Yes	Yes	Yes	Yes	Wrote 27 episodes, directed 3 episodes
2018	Co-Ed	No	Yes	No	No	
2019	Shook	No	Yes	No	No	
2021	Cinema Toast	No	Yes	No	No	
2024	Penelope	No	Yes	Yes	Yes	8 episodes
2024–present	The Creep Tapes	No	Yes	Yes	Yes	18 episodes

==== Documentary series ====
Executive producer

- Evil Genius (2018)
- Wild Wild Country (2018)
- On Tour with Asperger's Are Us (2019)
- The Lady and the Dale (2021)
- Sasquatch (2021)
- American Conspiracy: The Octopus Murders (2024)

=== Acting roles ===
==== Film ====
Year	Title	Role
2002	The New Brad	Brad
2003	Brighter Days	Jonathan
2004	Scrapple	Todd
2005	The Puffy Chair	Josh
2005	The Intervention	Mark
2007	Hannah Takes the Stairs	Mike
2009	Other People's Parties	Doug Rhineau
2009	True Adolescents	Sam
2009	Humpday	Ben
2010	Greenberg	Eric Beller
2010	Mars	Charlie Brownsville
2011	Your Sister's Sister	Jack
2012	Safety Not Guaranteed	Kenneth Calloway
2012	Darling Companion	Bryan Alexander
2012	People Like Us	Ted
2012	Zero Dark Thirty	Steve
2013	Parkland	Kenneth O'Donnell
2014	Tammy	Bobby
2014	Convention	Paul
2014	Creep	Josef
2014	The One I Love	Ethan
2014	Mercy	Uncle Lanning
2015	The Lazarus Effect	Frank Walton
2016	Blue Jay	Jim Henderson
2017	Creep 2	Aaron
2018	Tully	Craig Freehauf
2018	Duck Butter	Mark
2018	Love Sonia	Man in LA
2019	Paddleton	Michael Thompson
2019	Bombshell	Douglas Brunt
2021	Language Lessons	Adam
2021	7 Days	Daddy (voice)
2022	Biosphere	Billy
2025	Hurricanna	
2025	Noah Britton: The Best Stuff I've Ever Done	The Narrator (voice)
2026	Backrooms	Phil
2026	Bad Day	

==== Television ====
Year	Title	Role	Notes
2009–2015	The League	Pete Eckhart	84 episodes
2012–2017	The Mindy Project	Brendan Deslaurier	22 episodes
2013	Maron	Himself	Episode: "A Real Woman"
2015–2016	Togetherness	Brett Pierson	16 episodes
2015	Comedy Bang! Bang!	Himself	Episode: "Mark Duplass Wears a Striped Sweater and Jeans"
2016–2017	Animals	Various voices	3 episodes
2017	Comrade Detective	Todd (voice)	Episode: "Two Films for One Ticket"
2017	Manhunt: Unabomber	David Kaczynski	5 episodes
2017–2025	Big Mouth	Val Bilzerian / Clerk (voice)	14 episodes
2018–2019	Goliath	Tom Wyatt	9 episodes
2019–present	The Morning Show	Charlie "Chip" Black	29 episodes
2020	When the Streetlights Go On	Mr. Carpenter	4 episodes
2020	Room 104	Graham Husker	Episode: "The Murderer"
2021	Calls	Patrick (voice)	Episode: "Pedro Across the Street"
2022–2023	Pretzel and the Puppies	Pretzel (voice)	18 episodes
2023	Celebrity Jeopardy!	Himself	Contestant
2024-present	The Creep Tapes	Peachfuzz	12 episodes
2025	Good American Family	Michael Barnett	Lead role

== Bibliography ==
- Like Brothers (2018) (with Jay Duplass)

== Awards and nominations ==
Award	Year	Work	Category	Result	Ref(s)
Golden Globe Awards	2022	The Morning Show	Best Supporting Actor – Series, Miniseries or Television Film	Nominated	
Screen Actors Guild Awards	2022	The Morning Show	Outstanding Performance by an Ensemble in a Drama Series	Nominated	
Screen Actors Guild Awards	2024	The Morning Show	Outstanding Performance by an Ensemble in a Drama Series	Nominated	
Primetime Emmy Awards	2018	Wild Wild Country	Outstanding Documentary or Nonfiction Series	Won	
Primetime Emmy Awards	2020	The Morning Show	Outstanding Supporting Actor in a Drama Series	Nominated	
Primetime Emmy Awards	2024	The Morning Show	Outstanding Supporting Actor in a Drama Series	Nominated	
Producers Guild of America Awards	2019	Wild Wild Country	Outstanding Producer of Non-Fiction Television	Nominated	
Satellite Awards	2019	Goliath	Best Supporting Actor – Television Series	Nominated	
Peabody Awards	2022	Somebody Somewhere	Entertainment	Nominated	
