= Blue Jay (film) =

- Theatrical release poster
- Directed by: Alex Lehmann
- Written by: Mark Duplass
- Produced by: Mel Eslyn; Xan Aranda
- Starring: Mark Duplass; Sarah Paulson
- Cinematography: Alex Lehmann
- Edited by: Chris Donlon
- Music by: Julian Wass
- Production companies: Duplass Brothers Productions; Netflix; The Orchard
- Distributed by: The Orchard (United States); Netflix (International)
- Release dates: September 12, 2016 (TIFF); October 7, 2016 (United States)
- Running time: 80 minutes
- Country: United States
- Language: English
- Box office: $21,626

Blue Jay is a 2016 American romantic drama film directed by Alex Lehmann in his narrative feature debut, from a screenplay by Mark Duplass. It stars Duplass and Sarah Paulson. The film had its world premiere at the Toronto International Film Festival on September 12, 2016.

The film was released on October 7, 2016, in a limited release prior to being released through video on demand on October 11, 2016.

== Plot ==
Jim Henderson returns to his hometown in California with the intention of renovating and selling his late mother's house. While shopping at a supermarket, he bumps into his former high school girlfriend Amanda. The two greet each other, but Jim says he does not want to stop her from whatever she was up to.

He bumps into her again in the parking lot and they decide to go for coffee at Blue Jay. They talk about what has happened in their lives since they last saw each other. Amanda got married and became the stepmother to two children. Jim works on renovating old houses with his uncle and is thinking about renovating his late mother's house.

While walking Amanda to her car, they pass a liquor store they went to frequently in their younger days. Amanda bets that the store owner will recognize them, although Jim disagrees. To Amanda's satisfaction, he does remember them. He remarks about how the two "famous lovebirds" are still together after two decades and gives them free beer and jelly beans, while Amanda and Jim jokingly play along about how they are still a couple after all this time.

They further discuss their current lives in depth by a lake, leaving Jim crying and feeling discontented with his life when he hears of how impressive her life sounds. Going to his mother's house, they get nostalgic over their shared memories. While going through old memorabilia, Amanda finds a letter addressed to her written years ago, and keeps it.

She then finds tape recordings of Jim and her roleplaying their middle-aged lives. They play the recordings and laugh about how uncool they were. Jim proposes they have some "fun" and recreate the tape, pretending to be a married couple celebrating their 20th anniversary. At the end of the night, Amanda confesses to Jim she is on anti-depressants and that she has not cried in years. They eventually begin kissing passionately in the bedroom. She suddenly stops when he says he loves her. It is then revealed that Amanda had an abortion back in high school and that was the cause of their breakup. They lash out at each other, ending it with Jim breaking down and crying on the floor.

Jim walks Amanda to her car the next morning, and Amanda explains her decision. Jim asks her to read the letter he did not send her, saying he wanted to keep the baby. Amanda begins to cry, for the first time in five years, and then they laugh about it together. Jim and Amanda then sigh at one another and the screen fades to black.

== Cast ==
- Mark Duplass as Jim Henderson
- Sarah Paulson as Amanda
- Clu Gulager as Waynie

== Production ==
The film was shot over the course of 7 days in and around Crestline, California. Julian Wass composed the film's score. On the decision to film in black and white, Lehmann, who was also the film's cinematographer, told Filmmaker Magazine, that he wanted to strip down unnecessary elements of the film to create a quiet space for his characters. The film shot chronologically and without a script.

== Release ==
The film marked the Duplass Brothers' first film under their deal with Netflix. The film had its world premiere at the Toronto International Film Festival on September 12, 2016. The Orchard acquired distribution rights to the film, and set the film for an October 7, 2016, limited release before opening through video on demand on October 11, 2016. It was released on Netflix on December 6, 2016.

=== Critical reception ===
Blue Jay received positive reviews from film critics. It holds a 91% approval rating on the review aggregator website Rotten Tomatoes, based on 34 reviews, with an average rating of 7.5/10. The website's consensus reads, "Blue Jay's song will warm the soul of any hopeless romantic who loves trips down memory lane, impromptu dance scenes, and naturally performed two-handers." On Metacritic, the film holds a rating of 69 out of 100, based on 16 critics, indicating "generally favorable" reviews.

The Canadian Press reporter David Friend said the film "manages to capture the spirit of 1990s indie filmmaking at its finest, and offers some heartbreaking surprises along the way." Brian Tallerico of RogerEbert.com praised Paulson's performance, saying the film "features one of our best actresses in the kind of role she doesn't get to play that often."

== See also ==
- '96
