= Black Rock (2012 film) =

- Theatrical release poster
- Directed by: Katie Aselton
- Written by: Mark Duplass
- Produced by: Adele Romanski
- Starring: Katie Aselton; Lake Bell; Kate Bosworth
- Cinematography: Hillary Spera
- Edited by: Jacob Vaughan
- Music by: Ben Lovett
- Production company: Submarine Entertainment
- Distributed by: LD Entertainment
- Release dates: January 21, 2012 (Sundance); May 17, 2013 (United States)
- Running time: 80 minutes
- Country: United States
- Language: English
- Budget: $1 million

Black Rock is a 2012 American horror-thriller film directed by Katie Aselton, with a screenplay by her husband Mark Duplass. The film premiered on January 21, 2012 at the 2012 Sundance Film Festival and was released theatrically on May 17, 2013. Black Rock stars Aselton, Lake Bell, and Kate Bosworth as three friends who reunite after years apart on a remote island but end up having to fight for their lives.

== Plot ==
Sarah invites her childhood friends, Louise and Abby to a remote island that they once spent time at in their youth, in hopes of bringing their distant group back together. Though Abby and Lou are reluctant, they go with Sarah to the island. While there, they use a hand-drawn map to try to find a time capsule they had buried as kids. They give up after Abby picks a fight with Louise over Lou having slept with her boyfriend years ago, something Abby has never gotten over and which ruined their friendship.

On their first night while camping on the beach, they run into Henry, Derek and Alex, three veteran soldiers who are hunting on the island. Louise recognizes Henry as the younger brother of a former classmate and Abby invites the three to camp with them. While drunk, Abby flirts with Henry and eventually draws him into the woods to make out. When she tries to stop, Henry becomes aggressive and tries to rape her. Abby hits him in the head with a large rock.

Hearing Abby's screams, the rest of the group come running and find Henry dead. Abby tries to explain what happened but the men don't believe her and become enraged that she's murdered their best friend. Derek and Alex knock the three women unconscious. When they wake, they are tied together by the wrists on the beach. Derek, the more aggressive of the two men, is adamant about killing them, but Alex tries to stop him. Abby goads Derek into letting her go so they can fight hand-to-hand. When he does, Louise tackles him as Sarah throws sand at Alex's face to prevent him from attacking. The three women then separately escape and hide, and the two men vow to kill them.

After hiding separately, they meet up at a childhood fort and decide to wait until nightfall before trying to reach their boat. Upon doing so, they discover the two men have cut the rope that tied the boat to the shore, sending it floating out to sea. Abby and Lou both believe they could swim it but Sarah believes it's too far and that they'd die from hypothermia before reaching it. As they crawl towards the shore, Sarah loudly protests the plan and runs back towards the tree line where she is shot in the head by the men. Lou and Abby try to swim for the boat but cannot make it, instead heading back to another part of the shore. Alex falls down a hill while chasing them and breaks his leg. Louise and Abby return to the fort, take their wet clothes off and huddling for warmth. They then find the time capsule and retrieve a Swiss army knife from inside which they use to sharpen sticks into weapons. As they do, they talk about the past and reconcile.

The next morning the two search the island and find the hunters camping on the beach, with an injured Alex sleeping nearby. Abby crawls over to Alex, prepared to slit his throat. However, she accidentally wakes him, and he cries out for Derek. Lou runs at Derek, distracting him and Abby wrestles with Alex, eventually shooting him with his own shotgun. Derek chases Lou and Abby finally cornering them in an open field. He fires his gun, but realizes he has run out of bullets. He draws his hunting knife and the two women attack him from opposite directions. They fight, with a wounded Lou eventually slitting Derek's throat with his knife.

The movie ends with the two women sailing away from the island. Approaching a dock, they see some men who are preparing their boats. The men look at the women with concern and fear as they see them bloody and bruised.

== Cast ==
- Lake Bell as Louise
- Katie Aselton as Abby
- Kate Bosworth as Sarah
- Will Bouvier as Henry
- Jay Paulson as Derek
- Anslem Richardson as Alex
- Carl K. Aselton III as Fisherman

== Development ==
Katie Aselton began developing the film in 2011, expressing her interest in directing a thriller that audiences would see as realistic. Mark Duplass was confirmed as writing the screenplay and the couple sought to raise funds for the film through crowdsourcing on Kickstarter. Kate Bosworth and Lake Bell were signed to Black Rock to play Sarah and Lou, with Submarine Entertainment handling sales.

== Reception ==
Critical reception for the film has been mixed. On review aggregation website Rotten Tomatoes, it has an approval rating of 50% based on reviews from 56 critics with an average score of 5.3/10. The site's consensus reads, "It springs from smarter ideas than your average chase thriller, but ultimately, Black Rock falls back on disappointingly familiar ingredients". On Metacritic, it has a weighted average score of 46 out of 100, based on reviews from 19 critics, indicating "mixed or average" reviews.

A reviewer for Bloody Disgusting gave the film three out of five stars, questioning the intelligence of the female characters over what he saw as "stupid choices" and "lack of character logic". Justin Lowe of The Hollywood Reporter gave a mixed review, commenting that although the film was "satisfying", the film's female characters "hew perhaps too closely to genre stereotypes".

Alyssa Rosenberg of ThinkProgress praised the film, saying "There's something really powerful about the promise of a piece of popular culture that insists that a woman has the right to say no at any point in a sexual encounter, no matter how flirtatious she's been or how willing she's seemed up until that point, and that she has the right to say no without being judged or attacked."
