= Outside In (film) =

2017 film by Lynn Shelton

- Theatrical release poster
- Directed by: Lynn Shelton
- Written by: Lynn Shelton; Jay Duplass
- Produced by: Mel Eslyn; Lacey Leavitt
- Starring: Jay Duplass; Edie Falco; Kaitlyn Dever; Ben Schwartz
- Cinematography: Nathan M. Miller
- Edited by: Celia Beasley
- Music by: Andrew Bird
- Production company: Duplass Brothers Productions
- Distributed by: The Orchard
- Release dates: September 8, 2017 (TIFF); March 30, 2018 (United States)
- Running time: 109 minutes
- Country: United States
- Language: English
- Box office: $67,392

Outside In is a 2017 American drama film directed by Lynn Shelton, from a screenplay she co-wrote with Jay Duplass. It stars Duplass, Edie Falco, Kaitlyn Dever, and Ben Schwartz.

The film had its world premiere at the Toronto International Film Festival on September 8, 2017. It was released in the United States on March 30, 2018, by The Orchard, to positive critical response. At the 2018 Filmfest DC, the international SIGNIS jury honored the film with the SIGNIS Prize.

== Plot ==
Chris is released from prison at the age of 38, after serving 20 years for murder. At a surprise party to celebrate, he reunites with Carol, his former high school teacher, who was his confidant during his prison stay and who had successfully fought for his release. They later meet up, and Chris abruptly hugs her and gives her a portrait he made of her. Carol suspects he has a crush on her though her own feelings for him are complicated as she is married with a teen daughter.

After Carol urges him to try to meet and socialize with other women, Chris bikes over to her home and kisses her, confessing that he is in love with her. Despite her deep emotional connection to him, she insists they should try to be friends. Returning home, she goes to her husband Tom, who no longer sleeps in their bedroom, and tries to initiate sex, but he rejects her.

Chris goes over for breakfast at Carol's, and he, she and her daughter Hildy get along well, though the mood is spoiled by the arrival of Tom. Chris is frustrated by her limited time for him and that she is considering helping another convict get parole. In addition, Chris's brother has remained friends with the man who committed the crime that he was convicted of. Chris also has difficulties finding a job.

Hildy becomes interested in Chris and befriends him. She is surprised to learn he holds her mother in such high esteem and that he credits her with helping him get through prison.

Chris asks Carol to spend one day with him where the two of them can be themselves. They go out to dinner and an arcade before going to a motel. They consummate their relationship and confess their love for one another. The following morning, leaving the motel, they are seen by Tom and Hildy. Tom attacks Chris, who kicks him in the shins before fleeing.

Hildy disappears and is later found by Carol with Chris's help. Carol apologizes to her for not paying enough attention to her and prioritizing Chris. She says what happened between her and him was a one-time occurrence.

Tom moves out of the family home, Chris gets a job, and Hildy breaks into Chris and his brother's home, where she leaves an art sculpture which he recognizes as a sign of forgiveness.

Carol goes to visit Chris and tells him that their goals seem incompatible as he wants a simple life and she now craves a more fulfilling one. Nevertheless, she asks him out for lunch, hoping they will get to know each other as they are in the present, to which Chris agrees.

== Cast ==
- Edie Falco as Carol Beasley
- Jay Duplass as Chris Connelly
- Kaitlyn Dever as Hildy Beasley
- Ben Schwartz as Ted
- Pamela Reed as Aunt Bette
- Alycia Delmore as Tara
- Matt Malloy as Russell
- Louis Hobson as Matt
- Aaron Blakely as Shane
- Stephen Grenley as Phil
- Charles Leggett as Tom Beasley

== Production ==
Principal photography began in October 2016, over 20 days in Snohomish County, Washington.

== Release ==
The film had its world premiere at the Toronto International Film Festival on September 8, 2017. The Orchard acquired U.S. distribution rights to the film, with Netflix set to release the film shortly after. It also screened at South by Southwest on March 10, 2018. It was released in a limited release on March 30, 2018, before being released through video on demand on April 3, 2018.

=== Critical reception ===
Outside In received positive reviews from film critics. On Rotten Tomatoes, it has a 95% approval rating based on 42 reviews. The website's critics consensus reads, "Brilliantly brought to life by tenderly empathetic performances from Jay Duplass and Edie Falco, Outside In tells a sobering – yet thoroughly absorbing – story." On Metacritic, the film holds a rating of 76 out of 100, based on reviews from 18 critics, indicating "generally favorable reviews".

Dennis Harvey of Variety wrote: "Outside In feels eventful, even somewhat suspenseful, as we worry that being around so many screwups of one sort or another might endanger Chris’ still-fragile freedom."
