= The Freebie =

- Theatrical release poster
- Directed by: Katie Aselton
- Written by: Katie Aselton
- Produced by: Adele Romanski
- Starring: Dax Shepard; Katie Aselton
- Cinematography: Benjamin Kasulke
- Edited by: Nat Sanders
- Music by: Julian Wass
- Distributed by: Phase 4 Films
- Release dates: January 24, 2010 (Sundance); September 17, 2010 (United States)
- Running time: 80 minutes
- Country: United States
- Language: English
- Box office: $16,613

The Freebie is a 2010 American independent film directed by Katie Aselton that had its world premiere at the Sundance Film Festival. The plot centers on a married couple who, frustrated by the lack of sex in their relationship, allow each other a one-night stand. The film is largely improvised.

== Plot ==
Darren and Annie have a comfortable relationship built on love, trust and communication, enjoying each other's company and still laughing at each other's jokes. However, their sex life has become dormant. When a dinner party conversation with friends leads to an honest discussion about the state of their love life, they begin to flirt with an idea for a way to spice their marriage up. They each agree to one night of freedom, no strings attached, no questions asked.

== Cast ==
- Dax Shepard as Darren
- Katie Aselton as Annie
- Frankie Shaw as Coffee girl
- Ross Partridge as Bartender
- Sean Nelson as John
- Bellamy Young as Jessica
- Joshua Leonard as Dinner Party Guest
- Marguerite Phillips as Emily
- Ken Kennedy as Ken
- Scott Pitts as Scott
- Lenora Pitts as Lea

== Production ==
The script had originated as a detailed 6-page outline, with the rest of the dialogue being improvised. For some scenes, Aselton would let the camera roll for as long as 30 minutes, and then would choose which dialogue made it into the final cut. Dax Shepard signed on to play Darren after another actor exited the project.

== Release ==
The film had its world premiere at the 2010 Sundance Film Festival in the inaugural NEXT section. It was acquired by Phase 4 Films and went on to screen at SXSW. It was given a limited theatrical release on September 17, 2010.

== Reception ==
The Freebie holds a 55% approval rating on review aggregator website Rotten Tomatoes, with an average rating of 5.6/10 from 29 critics. On Metacritic, the film holds a rating of 54 out of 100, based on eight critics, indicating "mixed or average reviews".

Todd McCarthy of Variety gave the film a positive review, writing: "From a performance P.O.V., Aselton and Shepard hold the screen well and are most watchable, and Aselton does a fluid directing job within the limited challenge she set for herself production-wise. Benjamin Kasulke’s HD lensing is bright and sharp, while Nat Sanders’ editing is very crisp."

Stephen Holden of The New York Times wrote, "This minimalist indie with a title appropriate for a Judd Apatow comedy, is a smart seriocomic playlet with some emotionally harsh moments, although it refrains from plumbing its subject in agonizing depth." The San Francisco Chronicle's Mick LaSalle also gave a positive review, commenting "Aselton gets a lot said in 78 minutes. I think the main thing she says is something never overtly spoken, that life is essentially a lonely experience - even when we're surrounded by activity, and even if we never shut up."

Andrew Schenker of Slant gave the film a negative review and a 1.5/10 rating, writing: "Never are Aselton's failings more evident than in a pair of dinner party scenes, one of which opens the film, and which involve the central couple and their friends in a discussion of the nature of romance."
