= Manson Family Vacation =

2015 film directed by J. Davis

- Theatrical release poster
- Directed by: J. Davis
- Written by: J. Davis
- Produced by: Steve Bannatyne; Eric Blyler; J. Davis; J.M. Logan; Josh Polon; Matt Ratner; Alexandra Sandler
- Starring: Jay Duplass; Linas Phillips; Tobin Bell; Leonora Pitts; Adam Chernick; Davie-Blue
- Cinematography: Sean McElwee
- Edited by: Nick Sherman
- Music by: Heather McIntosh
- Production companies: Lucky Hat Entertainment; Logolite Entertainment; Mom & Pop Empire; Tilted Windmill Productions; Duplass Brothers Productions
- Distributed by: The Orchard
- Release dates: March 16, 2015 (SXSW); October 6, 2015 (United States)
- Running time: 84 minutes
- Country: United States
- Language: English

Manson Family Vacation is a 2015 American comedy film written and directed by J. Davis. The film stars Jay Duplass, Linas Phillips, Leonora Pitts, Adam Chernick and Tobin Bell. The film was released on October 6, 2015, by The Orchard.

== Cast ==
- Jay Duplass as Nick
- Linas Phillips as Conrad
- Leonora Pitts as Amanda
- Adam Chernick as Max
- Tobin Bell as Blackbird
- Davie-Blue as Sunshine
- Suzanne Ford as Janice
- Ray Laska as Frank
- Brent Alan Henry as Officer Phiffer
- Matt Bennett as Buddy Holly
- Justin M. Rasch as Skullface
- Jonathan Brooks as Rockabilly

== Release ==
The film premiered at South by Southwest on March 16, 2015. Shortly after, Netflix acquired distribution rights to the film. In June 2015, The Orchard acquired distribution rights to the film. The film was released on video on demand on October 6, 2015. It was released on Netflix on October 27, 2015.

== Critical reception ==
Manson Family Vacation received positive reviews from film critics. It holds a 100% approval rating on review aggregator website Rotten Tomatoes, based on 13 reviews.

Justin Chang of Variety gave the film a positive review writing: "It’s a measure of the film’s dramatic balance as well as its emotional integrity that both of these men will wind up eliciting the viewer’s sympathy and scorn at different points, so that by the end of 'Manson Family Vacation,' we have arrived alongside them at a crucial point of transition and understanding — not the most surprising destination, perhaps, but one that feels entirely earned."
