= Unlovable =

- Film poster
- Directed by: Suzi Yoonessi
- Written by: Charlene deGuzman; Mark Duplass; Sarah Adina Smith
- Produced by: Jen Roskind
- Starring: Charlene deGuzman; Melissa Leo; John Hawkes
- Cinematography: Moira Morel
- Edited by: Kristina Davies
- Music by: Christopher French; John Hawkes
- Production company: Duplass Brothers Productions
- Distributed by: Orion Classics
- Release dates: March 10, 2018 (South by Southwest); November 1, 2018
- Running time: 80 minutes
- Country: United States
- Language: English

Unlovable is a 2018 American comedy-drama musical film directed by Suzi Yoonessi, and written by and starring Charlene deGuzman. The film tells the story of Joy, a Filipino-American woman, her struggle with sex and love addiction, and her recovery through music and platonic friendship. The film also stars John Hawkes and Melissa Leo, and is co-written by Sarah Adina Smith and Mark Duplass. The film was produced by Duplass Brothers Productions and distributed by Orion Classics. The film premiered at SXSW and received special jury recognition for the LUNA Gamechanger Award.

== Background ==
In an L.A. Times interview, deGuzman disclosed that she contacted Mark Duplass via Twitter DM about the initial script for Unlovable, which she first wrote as a pilot 30 days into a 12-step program for sex and love addiction. Duplass described her as "writing at the funeral, basically. It was all alive, and it was a learning process."

== Plot ==
Joy is a sex and love addict. At the onset of the film, she tries to kill herself by taking pills and drinking NyQuil, but fails. She is in a questionable relationship with her boyfriend Ben who also works with her as an actor on a children's show, and who does not treat her well. Joy is constantly on the search for something to fill the emptiness in her soul, but nothing ever seems to be enough, whether it be drugs, alcohol, or sex. After Ben cancels plans with Joy, she gets drunk and has sex with another man. Finding pierogies in the refrigerator, the telltale sign that Joy went on a bender the night before, Ben breaks up with her and tells her to get help.

Joy goes to a sex and love addicts meeting where she meets Maddie, who she tries to get to be her sponsor. Initially, Maddie declines, but she does give Joy her phone number.

That night, Ben tells Joy to move out. In response, she goes out and then wakes up underneath a stranger in his house. The house is full of other men, asleep in various states of undress, who were apparently there for a Bachelor party. Joy finds a stack of photographs of herself from the night and is disgusted with what she sees. The first man offers Joy money for her services, assuming she is a prostitute. As she leaves, she gets a call from her boss, saying that she has been fired. Distressed, she calls Ben and then her parents, but no one answers.

She calls Maddie, who comes to pick her up and then agrees to sponsor her, so long as she goes 30 consecutive days sober from sex and romance. As Joy struggles to get sober, she follows Maddie's suggestion of adopting a hobby and finds herself taking over the drum kit in the garage that belongs to Maddie's awkward brother, Jim. As the two of them create music together, a secret friendship grows.

== Cast ==
- Charlene deGuzman as Joy
- John Hawkes as Jim
- Melissa Leo as Maddie
- Paul James as Ben
- Jake McDorman as Jesse
- Alim Kouliev as Konrad
- Josh Fadem as Logan
- Josh Ruben as Sam
- Ben Blenkle as Corey
- Pam Trotter as Bonnie
- Camille Cregan as Janice
- Nicholas Norsten as Rick
- Amy Pham as Vanessa
- Ele Woods as Elenor
- Jimmy Fowlie as James
- Garrett Hanson as Rob
- Zac Oyama as Greg
- Damian Gomez as Enrique
- Morgan Krantz as Dean
- Neil Lewis as Peter
- Alexi Stavrou as Blake
- Josh Marcus as Aaron
- Julia Stephens as Chelsea
- Craig Coyne as Chad
- Kobe Reverditto as Tommy
- Matt Cordova as Louie
- Abe Pagtama as Joy's Dad
- Gigette Reyes as Joy's Mom
- Ellen Geer as Nana

== Release ==
In September 2018, Orion Classics acquired distribution rights to Unlovable in North and Latin America. The film had a theatrical release beginning November 1, 2018, and was launched on video on demand and digitally the following day.

== Reception ==
On review aggregator Rotten Tomatoes, the film holds an approval rating of 82% based on 17 reviews, with an average rating of 7.7/10. On Metacritic, the film has a weighted average score of 77 out of 100, based on 7 critics, indicating "generally favorable reviews".

IndieWire gave the film a B+ rating, stating that: "It's a fluffy spin on the recovery genre, but it's a fresh one, and deGuzman's hard-won life experience adds veracity and honesty to the snappy narrative." In its review of the film, Film Journal International considered that: "Duplass, deGuzman and director Suzi Yoonessi have packaged a slight but sure winner." In their review of the film, the LA Times stated: "Here, director Suzi Yoonessi and co-writer/star Charlene deGuzman gift audiences with an oddball protagonist who is a real human being, and not the one-note manic pixie dream girl that plagues lesser indies."
