= The One I Love (film) =

2014 American surrealist comedy thriller film

- Theatrical release poster
- Directed by: Charlie McDowell
- Written by: Justin Lader
- Produced by: Mel Eslyn
- Starring: Mark Duplass; Elisabeth Moss; Ted Danson
- Cinematography: Doug Emmett
- Edited by: Jennifer Lilly
- Music by: Danny Bensi; Saunder Jurriaans
- Production company: Duplass Brothers Productions
- Distributed by: RADiUS-TWC
- Release dates: January 21, 2014 (Sundance); August 22, 2014 (United States)
- Running time: 91 minutes
- Country: United States
- Language: English
- Box office: $583,264

The One I Love is a 2014 American surrealist comedy thriller film directed by Charlie McDowell and written by Justin Lader, starring Mark Duplass and Elisabeth Moss. The film had its world premiere at the Sundance Film Festival on January 21, 2014. It was released on August 1, 2014, through video on demand, prior to a limited release on August 22, 2014, by RADiUS-TWC. At the advice of their therapist, Ethan and Sophie go on a couple's retreat to save their marriage, but they realize something strange is afoot when recollections of their interactions start to misalign.

== Plot ==
Married couple Ethan and Sophie see a therapist regularly. After asking them to each play a note on a piano, he identifies a disconnection in their relationship and suggests they spend a couple's weekend on a secluded estate.

At the estate, Sophie has sex with Ethan in the guest cottage. She returns to the house to find Ethan asleep. When she mentions the sex, he says he cannot remember, so Sophie, annoyed, goes to bed alone and he sleeps in the guest cottage. During the night, Sophie joins him, apologizing for her behavior and falls asleep next to him. The next morning, she makes him eggs and bacon, which is odd, as Ethan notes that she hates cooking bacon in the house.

Ethan returns to the main house where Sophie has no memory of joining him in the guest cottage. He infers that something unusual is going on: in the guest cottage, they each met a doppelgänger of the other, convincing enough to pass. By visiting with Sophie II, Ethan establishes the doppelgängers do not leave the guest cottage. Barging in on Sophie's session with Ethan II, Ethan determines that the doppelgängers disappear when both spouses are in the guest cottage, and that the doubles are idealized versions of them. Ethan and Sophie take advantage of the circumstances, and set rules, including a rule of "no intimacy".

Ethan figures out that Ethan II has taken some of his clothing, and Ethan receives voicemails from friends and family, answering calls, made in his voice, asking about his past. Sophie starts developing feelings for Ethan II and goes to the guest cottage to seduce him. Ethan discovers this by claiming to leave, but instead entering the guest house and assuming the place of his doppelgänger. Sophie seduces the real Ethan, unbeknownst to her.

The next morning, Sophie seeks refuge with Ethan II, and Ethan disturbs them by entering the guest cottage. As they argue and return to the main house, they find Sophie II and Ethan II awaiting them. The four spend the evening together, where it becomes clear that Ethan II and Sophie II know they are playing roles. Ethan II reveals Ethan's duplicity at the guest cottage, and Sophie asks Ethan to leave. He goes to the guest cottage and finds a computer with files for different couples that include recordings of voices. One is labeled "Ethan & Sophie" and has recordings of two people learning to imitate him and Sophie.

Ethan finds he is trapped in the guest house, but Sophie II lets him out. She explains that she and Ethan II must cause the visiting couple to fall out of love. Then the trapped couple leave, with the visiting couple now trapped within the estate. However, Ethan II has fallen in love with Sophie and is planning to leave with her. Sophie II does not want her husband to leave with another woman. Ethan explains this to Sophie, but Ethan II catches him revealing the plan.

Ethan II attempts to convince Sophie to flee with him. When she refuses, he runs towards the road but hits an invisible barrier and collapses unconscious. The Sophies have opposing reactions, one distressed for Ethan II and the other smiling at Ethan. Ethan grabs the smiling Sophie, and they leave.

Ethan and Sophie drive to the therapist's office and find it abandoned, so they head home. The next morning, they are happy and flirtatious together, and Sophie goes to make Ethan breakfast. When he asks her what she's making, she replies eggs and bacon; taken aback, Ethan takes a long moment to ponder this before joining her.

== Cast ==
- Mark Duplass as Ethan
- Elisabeth Moss as Sophie
- Ted Danson as therapist
- Mary Steenburgen as Mom (voice)
- Charlie McDowell as Madison (voice)
- Mel Eslyn as Victoria (voice)

== Production ==
In March 2013, it was revealed that Elisabeth Moss, Mark Duplass, and Ted Danson had been cast in the film, with Mel Eslyn producing and Duplass executive producing. Mary Steenburgen provided the voice of Duplass's character's mother. Rooney Mara, McDowell's girlfriend (at the time), served as the costume designer, but received credit as Bree Daniel.

=== Filming ===
Principal photography lasted 15 days, at Mary Steenburgen and Ted Danson's house in Ojai, California.

== Release ==
The film had its world premiere at the 2014 Sundance Film Festival on January 21, 2014. Shortly after, RADiUS-TWC acquired worldwide distribution rights to the film. The film went onto screen at the Tribeca Film Festival on April 25, 2014. That same month, RADiUS set the film for an August 15, 2014 release. It was released through video on demand on August 1, 2014, prior to a limited release on August 22, 2014.

=== Home media ===
The film was released to Blu-Ray and DVD by Anchor Bay Entertainment on November 4, 2014. It was then released on Netflix on November 29, 2014, and has since been made available to stream on Netflix.

== Reception ==
=== Box office ===
The One I Love opened in a limited release in the United States in 8 theaters and grossed $48,059 with an average of $6,007 per theater and ranking number 42 at the box office. The film's widest release was 82 theaters and it ended up earning $513,447 domestically and $69,817 internationally for a total of $583,264. The film made an additional $500,000 through video on demand sales.

=== Critical response ===
The One I Love received mostly positive reviews from critics and has a score of 83% on review aggregator Rotten Tomatoes based on 95 reviews with an average rating of 7.00/10. The critical consensus states, "The One I Love doesn't take its intriguing premise quite as far as it could, but it still adds up to an ambitious, well-acted look at love and marriage." The film also has a score of 65 out of 100 on Metacritic based on 27 critics.

Manohla Dargis of The New York Times praised Moss's performance writing, "In The One I Love, she creates a complex portrait of a woman tested by love whose smiles work like a barricade until fissures of feeling break down her last defenses."

Geoffrey Berkshire of Variety wrote that "Charlie McDowell makes an incredibly assured directorial debut with this smart crowd-pleaser, featuring spectacular performances from Mark Duplass and Elisabeth Moss." Kate Erbland of Film.com praised the film, calling it a "tightly constructed and cleverly designed take on the modern love story". Cory Everett of IndieWire graded the film B, stating, "It's a very small-scale, unassuming relationship movie (with a heady little twist), but it sneaks up on you."

However, Todd McCarthy of The Hollywood Reporter criticized the film, commenting, "On a moment-to-moment basis, this smoothly made film can be incredibly trying, even annoying, to watch, due to the grueling repetitiveness of the scenes and dialogue and the claustrophobia of the paradoxically beautiful setting."
