= Young Hearts (2020 film) =

- Directed by: Sarah Sherman; Zachary Ray Sherman
- Written by: Sarah Sherman
- Produced by: Elise Freeman
- Starring: Anjini Taneja Azhar; Quinn Liebling
- Cinematography: Martim Vian
- Edited by: John-Michael Powell
- Production company: Duplass Brothers Productions
- Distributed by: Blue Fox Entertainment
- Release dates: 24 January 2020 (Slamdance Film Festival); 12 February 2021 (US)
- Running time: 81 minutes
- Country: United States
- Language: English

Young Hearts (originally titled Thunderbolt in Mine Eye) is a 2020 American coming-of-age romantic drama film directed by Sarah Sherman and Zachary Ray Sherman, starring Anjini Taneja Azhar and Quinn Liebling.

== Plot ==
A teen love story that explores the discomfort that comes with first relationships.

== Cast ==
- Anjini Taneja Azhar as Harper
- Quinn Liebling as Tilly
- Alex Jarmon as Adam
- Ayla Carda as Abby
- Embry Johnson as Justin
- Eric Martin Reid as Mark
- Sharonlee McLean as Jocelyn
- Tanner Orcutt as Liam
- Kelly Grace Richardson as Madison
- Morgan Demetre as Luna
- David Withers as Bob
- Dennis Fitzpatrick as Principal Byers
- Carter Jon as Ethan
- Jonas Schouten as Henry
- Chinenye Igwe as Rosalind
- Danny Garrison as Josh
- Scott Kuza as Mr. Sloane

== Release ==
The film premiered at the Slamdance Film Festival on 24 January 2020.

== Reception ==
Tara McNara of Common Sense Media rated the film 3 stars out of 5 and called the film "authentically awkward". She praised Liebling's performance, and wrote that he "delivers every look and line with a naturalness."

Sylvie Baggett of Bust wrote that the film has a "naive sweetness", and that it is "as awkward and charming as first love itself."

Kristen Yoonsoo Kim of The New York Times wrote that while the characters have a few "nice, even revelatory scenes that combine humor and pain", their "dominant mode of interaction by the movie’s end seems to be silence, just as it was at the beginning, and we never do get to know Marvin or Stanley very well."

Brian Shaer of Film Threat gave the film a score of 7/10 and wrote that the film is "so well-intentioned that it’s tough to single out the negative."
