= Bad Milo! =

- Directed by: Jacob Vaughan
- Written by: Benjamin Hayes; Jacob Vaughan
- Produced by: Gabriel Cowan; Adele Romanski; John Suits
- Starring: Ken Marino; Peter Stormare; Gillian Jacobs; Stephen Root; Mary Kay Place; Patrick Warburton
- Cinematography: James Laxton
- Edited by: David Nordstrom
- Music by: Ted Masur
- Production companies: New Artists Alliance; Floren Shieh Productions; Duplass Brothers Productions
- Distributed by: Magnet Releasing
- Release dates: March 10, 2013 (SXSW); October 4, 2013 (United States)
- Running time: 84 minutes
- Country: United States
- Language: English
- Box office: $19,613

Bad Milo! is a 2013 American horror comedy film written by Jacob Vaughan and Benjamin Hayes and directed by Jacob Vaughan. The film stars Ken Marino, Gillian Jacobs, Peter Stormare, Stephen Root, Mary Kay Place, and Patrick Warburton. The film had its world premiere at South by Southwest on March 10, 2013, and was released on video on demand on August 29, 2013, prior to being given a limited theatrical release on October 4, 2013, by Magnet Releasing.

== Plot ==
A man named Duncan lives with his wife, Sarah, who worries about his constant stress. One day, he schedules an appointment with a gastroenterologist after experiencing a rather serious level of gastric stress the night before. During the appointment, the doctor and nurse spot a large "polyp" in his intestinal tract. After seeing a large amount of stress at a very fast pace from work with his boss placing him in charge of firing employees, Duncan’s mother is dating a man around his age, and his wife is making him see a very eccentric therapist who keeps asking about his father issues, something unusual happens. The polyp forms into a 2-foot-tall sentient being, and begins killing each person the creature sees as a source of stress with each day. The local news reports the murders as having been attacks by a rabid raccoon.

Duncan's therapist informs him that the creature is the living manifestation of his life's stress built up over time, and that mythology of this type of being states that the best way to eliminate it is to bond with it so it doesn't act so irrationally. In an effort to bond with it, Duncan names this strange anal-dwelling creature Milo.

First, Milo kills his co-worker, then the E.D. doctor he didn't need, yet who wouldn't stop calling him. Soon enough, Milo kills Duncan's boss in an elevator during an investigation by the FBI at his office building. When it finally attacks his father, who apparently had a being of the same species, and begins killing the other being, Duncan loses his grip and moves Milo and himself to a hotel room far away and safer for potential victims. This doesn't work, much as it seems to at the outset and Milo tracks Sarah down to her house party where a violent battle ensues between Duncan and Milo. Ultimately Duncan dismembers Milo's left arm and legs, and finally saves its life, vowing to never ignore Milo's important influence and make amends with Milo, successfully doing so before Sarah reinserts Milo back up his anus.

Ultimately Milo's bloodline is discovered to be carried on through Duncan's unborn son, the embryo of the new creature being seen in the system of the unborn fetus.

== Cast ==
- Ken Marino as Duncan
- Gillian Jacobs as Sarah
- Stephen Root as Roger
- Peter Stormare as Highsmith
- Mary Kay Place as Beatrice
- Patrick Warburton as Phil
- Kumail Nanjiani as Bobbi
- Michael Penfold as the Goblin

== Release ==
The film had its world premiere at the South by Southwest film festival on March 10, 2013. Shortly after it was announced Magnet Releasing had acquired distribution rights to the film. The film went on to screen at the Karlovy Vary International Film Festival on June 29, 2013. The film was released on August 29, 2013, through video on demand, before being given a limited theatrical release on October 4, 2013.

== Reception ==
The film holds a 58% rating on Rotten Tomatoes based on 36 reviews; the consensus states: "Bad Milo! sets some deliriously low expectations with its gross premise – and then manages to match most of them in sick, entertaining style."
