= Duplass Brothers Productions =

American production company

- Company type: Private
- Industry: Motion pictures; Television; Entertainment
- Founded: 1996
- Founder: Mark Duplass; Jay Duplass
- Headquarters: Los Angeles, U.S.
- Key people: Mark Duplass; Jay Duplass; Mel Eslyn
- Products: Film; Television
- Website: duplassbrothers.com

Duplass Brothers Productions is an American independent film and television production company founded by Mark Duplass and Jay Duplass, two brothers who are also actors, directors, producers and writers. They have produced films such as The Puffy Chair (2005), Safety Not Guaranteed (2012), The One I Love (2014) and The Skeleton Twins (2014), and the HBO comedy-drama television series Togetherness (2015–2016) and Room 104 (2017–2020).

== History ==
Duplass Brothers Productions was founded in 1996, with the release of the first film by brothers Jay Duplass and Mark Duplass. The company originally produced low-budget mumblecore films, but has since expanded to studio projects. In 2015, the Duplass Brothers expanded into television with their first series Togetherness, in which Mark also stars. In January 2015, Duplass Brothers Productions closed a four-picture deal with Netflix, involving financing from the company and, after a short theatrical run, the films being available to Netflix subscribers. In June 2015, Duplass Brothers Productions finalized a seven-picture distribution deal with The Orchard, releasing the Duplass-produced films theatrically prior to their Netflix release. Under the TV production arm Duplass Brothers Television, they signed a two-year overall deal with HBO in June 2015. In August 2016, Duplass Brothers announced another television project, Room 104, to air on HBO in 2017, which was quickly renewed for a second season. In 2018, it was announced the company had entered into a new four-picture deal with Netflix, which gave the streaming giant worldwide rights. Mel Eslyn was named president of Duplass Brothers Productions in 2017.

== Filmography ==
=== Film ===
- Connect 5 (1996)
- The Puffy Chair (2006)
- Baghead (2008)
- Cyrus (2010)
- Jeff, Who Lives at Home (2011)
- Safety Not Guaranteed (2012)
- The Do-Deca-Pentathlon (2012)
- Bad Milo! (2013)
- The One I Love (2014)
- The Skeleton Twins (2014)
- Adult Beginners (2014)
- The Overnight (2015)
- Creep (2015)
- Tangerine (2015)
- 6 Years (2015)
- Manson Family Vacation (2015)
- The Bronze (2016)
- Blue Jay (2016)
- Rainbow Time (2016)
- Take Me (2017)
- Outside In (2017)
- Duck Butter (2018)
- Unlovable (2018)
- Paddleton (2019)
- Horse Girl (2020)
- Language Lessons (2021)
- 7 Days (2021)
- As of Yet (2021)
- Spin Me Round (2022)
- I'll Show You Mine (2022)
- Biosphere (2022)
- The Drop (2022)
- Jazzy (2024)
- The Knife (2024)
- Magic Hour (2025)

=== Shorts ===
- This Is John (2003)
- Scrapple (2004)
- The Intervention (2005)

=== Television ===
- Togetherness (2015–16 for HBO)
- Animals. (2016–18 for HBO)
- Room 104 (2017–20 for HBO)
- Cinema Toast (2021 for Showtime)
- Somebody Somewhere (2022–24 for HBO)
- Penelope (2024 for Netflix)
- The Creep Tapes (2024 for Shudder)

=== Documentaries ===
- Asperger's Are Us (2016 for Netflix)
- Wild Wild Country (2018 for Netflix)
- Evil Genius: The True Story of America's Most Diabolical Bank Heist (2018 for Netflix)
- On Tour with Asperger's Are Us (2019 for HBO)
- The Lady and the Dale (2021 for HBO)
- Not Going Quietly (2021)
- Sasquatch (2021 for Hulu)
- Tony Hawk: Until the Wheels Fall Off (2023 for HBO)
- Last Stop Larrimah (2023 for HBO)
- American Conspiracy: The Octopus Murders (2024 for Netflix)
- Out There: Crimes of the Paranormal (2024 for Hulu)
