= Asperger's Are Us =

American comedy troupe

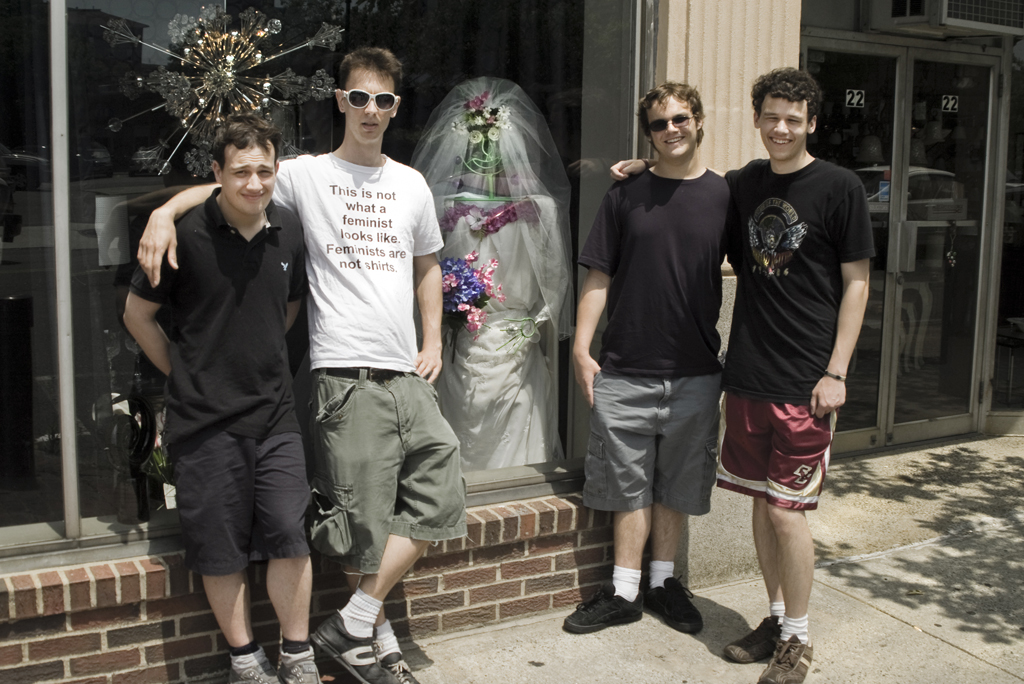
- From left, Ethan Finlan, Noah Britton, New Michael Ingemi, and Jack Hanke

Comedy career
- Years active: 2010-2018, 2019-present
- Genres: Satire, surreal humor, puns
- Members: Tripp Carey (former member); Ethan Finlan; Jack Hanke; Noah Britton; New Michael Ingemi
- Website: www.aspergersareus.com

Asperger's Are Us is an American comedy troupe. They are the first comedy troupe consisting entirely of people with Asperger syndrome, though their shows do not reference autism at all.

== Biography ==
Asperger's Are Us formed on the North Shore of Massachusetts in the summer of 2010 after New Michael Ingemi, Jack Hanke, and Ethan Finlan graduated from a summer camp where Noah Britton was their counselor.

They have performed over 150 original sketch comedy shows in ten countries and have been interviewed many times by press around the world. Despite several people incorrectly assuming that Asperger's Are Us formed to "prove that autistic people can be funny," they have always emphatically insisted that they formed solely to be funny, and are offended by the assumption that autistic people would need to prove themselves capable of humor. They state that their name reflects their "Aspie style of humor, which focuses on dark absurdism and wordplay, which Aspies seem to enjoy a lot".

Examples of their humor include selling death certificates as tour merch "with blank spaces where we filled in the buyer's name, birthday, and cause of death", onstage haircuts from a randomly chosen audience member during several shows, hiring a real CPR demonstration as an opening act at the Kennedy Center, reading all of Dink Johnson's Wikipedia article out loud for a sketch, performing a puppet show explaining complex economic theory, calling Hawaiian hotels (via speakerphone onstage) to ask detailed questions about valet parking options, hiding perennial presidential candidate Vermin Supreme under a tablecloth onstage for 4 minutes before he walked out to silently wave at the audience and exit, and having the audience vote for a specific stranger's artwork in an online children's art competition.

A Duplass Brothers Productions documentary about the troupe was released on Netflix in late 2016. A follow-up, On Tour with Asperger's Are Us, debuted on HBO on 30 April 2019.

Asperger's Are Us disbanded in 2018, but reunited and continued to tour in 2019.
