= As of Yet =

2021 American film directed by Chanel James and Taylor Garron

- Directed by: Taylor Garron; Chanel James
- Screenplay by: Taylor Garron
- Produced by: Taylor Garron; Ashley Edouard
- Starring: Taylor Garron; Eva Victor; Ayo Edebiri; Quinta Brunson; Amir Khan
- Production company: Duplass Brothers Productions
- Release date: June 11, 2021 (Tribeca)
- Running time: 81 minutes
- Country: United States
- Language: English

As of Yet is a 2021 American comedy film written by Taylor Garron and co-directed with Chanel James. Garron also stars. It premiered at the 2021 Tribeca Film Festival, where it received the Nora Ephron Award.

== Plot ==
The film "centers on Naomi (Garron), who navigates a problematic roommate and a burgeoning romance, all while locked down during the coronavirus pandemic."

== Cast ==
- Taylor Garron as Naomi, a young woman based in Brooklyn, trying to adjust to life at the onset of the COVID-19 pandemic
- Eva Victor as Sara, Naomi's roommate, who goes to Florida to stay with her parents during the pandemic lockdown
- Amir Khan as Reed, a man Naomi meets through a dating app
- Quinta Brunson as Lyssa, one of Naomi's best friends
- Ayo Edebiri as Khadijah, another of Naomi's best friends
- Paula Akpan as Sadie, Naomi's British cousin

== Production ==
Taylor Garron and Chanel James co-directed As of Yet, which Garron also wrote and in which she also stars. The pair worked together previously on James' directorial debut The Things We Do When We’re Alone. The Duplass Brothers produced the film with Garron and Ashley Edouard.

The majority of the film is depicted though FaceTime calls and video diary entries.

== Release ==
The film premiered at Tribeca Film Festival in June 2021. It later screened at the Philadelphia Film Festival.

== Reception ==
The film received mainly positive reception. In a positive review, Lovia Gyarkye wrote in The Hollywood Reporter, "Garron and Victor’s portrayal of friends who are struggling to understand each other’s point of view is refreshingly honest and appropriately cringey. Conversations are at the heart of As of Yet, and Garron manages to capture how they ebb and flow with the different rhetorical quirks people develop." Candice Frederick of TheGrio noted that "nothing is particularly innovative about its style", but also described the film as "engaging to watch obviously resonant reflections of life’s new challenges articulated on screen".

M.G. Mailloux of In Review Online praised her acting: "Garron is charismatic and lively as a performer, her presence never deflating or grating", but also stated that "as of yet never quite figures out how to say all that it wants to say without forsaking nuance or elegance".

== Awards and nominations ==
- 2021 – Tribeca Film Festival, Nora Ephron Award, Winner
- 2021 – Denver International Film Festival, American Independent Film Award, Nominee
