= Biosphere (film) =

2022 film by Mel Eslyn

- Theatrical release poster
- Directed by: Mel Eslyn
- Written by: Mel Eslyn; Mark Duplass
- Produced by: Zackary Drucker: Mel Eslyn; Maddie Buis; Shuli Harel
- Starring: Sterling K. Brown; Mark Duplass
- Cinematography: Nathan M. Miller
- Edited by: Chris Donlon
- Music by: Danny Bensi; Saunder Jurriaans
- Production company: Duplass Brothers Productions
- Distributed by: IFC Films
- Release dates: September 12, 2022 (TIFF); July 7, 2023 (United States)
- Running time: 107 minutes
- Country: United States
- Language: English
- Box office: $96,257

Biosphere is a 2022 American science fiction comedy film directed by Mel Eslyn (in her feature length directorial debut) and written by Eslyn and Mark Duplass. It stars Sterling K. Brown and Duplass.

The film premiered at the 2022 Toronto International Film Festival in September 2022 and was released on July 7, 2023.

== Plot ==
After a global apocalypse that has killed almost all humans, the only survivors are childhood friends Billy, the former president of the United States of America, and Ray, a scientist and Billy's former adviser. Whilst a depressed Billy feels responsible for causing the apocalypse, Ray remains positive and emphasises the importance of hope, often citing the story of his eighth birthday party - a magician drew a bowling ball on a pad of paper and summoned a real one that landed with a thud on the floor, a trick that still mystifies Ray. The two live in a dome built by Ray that protects them from the outside environment, a job Billy later admits he only delegated to Ray to stop his 'managing' of him. They maintain a fishpond which helps to power the dome, but become distressed when the last remaining female fish dies, leaving behind only two male fish, one of which appears to be dying. Billy also becomes nauseous and feverish. Ray stays up late one night, and discovers the possibility that the fish are undergoing sequential hermaphroditism to continue breeding, and notices a bright green light outside the dome. The next morning, Ray tells Billy about his discovery, and Billy realizes that he is also undergoing sequential hermaphroditism and is gradually developing female sex organs.

Billy is distraught over the changes to his body, whilst Ray is excited to study what is happening. Meanwhile, the two notice the green light grows bigger each day. Ray begins feeling uncomfortable around Billy after he becomes aroused when he accidentally touches Billy's breast. After the fish begin breeding, Billy reveals to Ray that he has begun to menstruate, and suggests that they try to have a child together. Ray rejects Billy, and refuses to speak to him, even moving his bed from their shared room and putting up a sheet to avoid looking at each other. Ray admits to Billy that he is hesitant to procreate because he was raised with homophobic values, despite his efforts to be more progressive. He also shares his fear that if Billy's body can't handle the pregnancy, he will lose him. Ray and Billy decide to have sex to try and impregnate Billy, initially with a sheet over Billy's body, which Ray eventually pulls off, and the two kiss. Billy becomes pregnant, and the two become much closer.

A big storm hits the dome and breaks the windows, forcing Ray and Billy to break apart the fishpond to patch the broken panes. The next morning, the two are amazed to see the green light has become some aurora borealis, indicating the sky is becoming less cloudy and Billy discovers that the storm could mean Earth's atmosphere is returning. He also wonders about the possibility of other survivors in their own bunkers. However, Ray remains distraught, as their supply of food is ending with the dead fish. Seeing Ray's anxiety and hopelessness, a reversal of the two's emotional states at the beginning of the film, the optimistic Billy uses a pad of paper and draws a bowling ball, just as the magician at Ray's birthday party did. The screen goes black as a thud is heard.

== Cast ==
- Sterling K. Brown as Ray
- Mark Duplass as Billy

== Production ==
Biosphere was written by Mel Eslyn and Mark Duplass, who got the outline for the plot when they attended a writers' retreat in 2018. Eslyn also produced alongside Zackary Drucker, Maddie Buis and Shuli Harel, with Mark Duplass and Jay Duplass executive producers. IFC Films bought the North American rights for the film in November 2022.

== Release ==
The film had its world premiere at the 2022 Toronto International Film Festival on September 10, 2022. It was released in theaters and on demand on July 7, 2023.

== Reception ==
On the review aggregator website Rotten Tomatoes, 80% of 90 critics' reviews are positive, with an average rating of 6.7/10. The website's consensus reads: "Biosphere's rambling, unfinished feel doesn't always serve its thoughtful themes, but it's often offset by the engaging interplay between the movie's well-matched leads." Metacritic, which uses a weighted average, assigned the film a score of 59 out of 100, based on 17 critics, indicating "mixed or average" reviews.

John DeFore of The Hollywood Reporter described it as "post-apocalyptic survival meets … anxious buddy humour" and "a mysterious and hilarious pic". Anthony Lane of The New Yorker called it "sometimes larky in tone," but also "a frowningly intense venture that never stops being about itself." Mick LaSalle of the San Francisco Chronicle stated that "at its length, Biosphere is soporific and repetitive and puts viewers in the position of always being two steps ahead of it."
