= Mel Eslyn =

American film producer

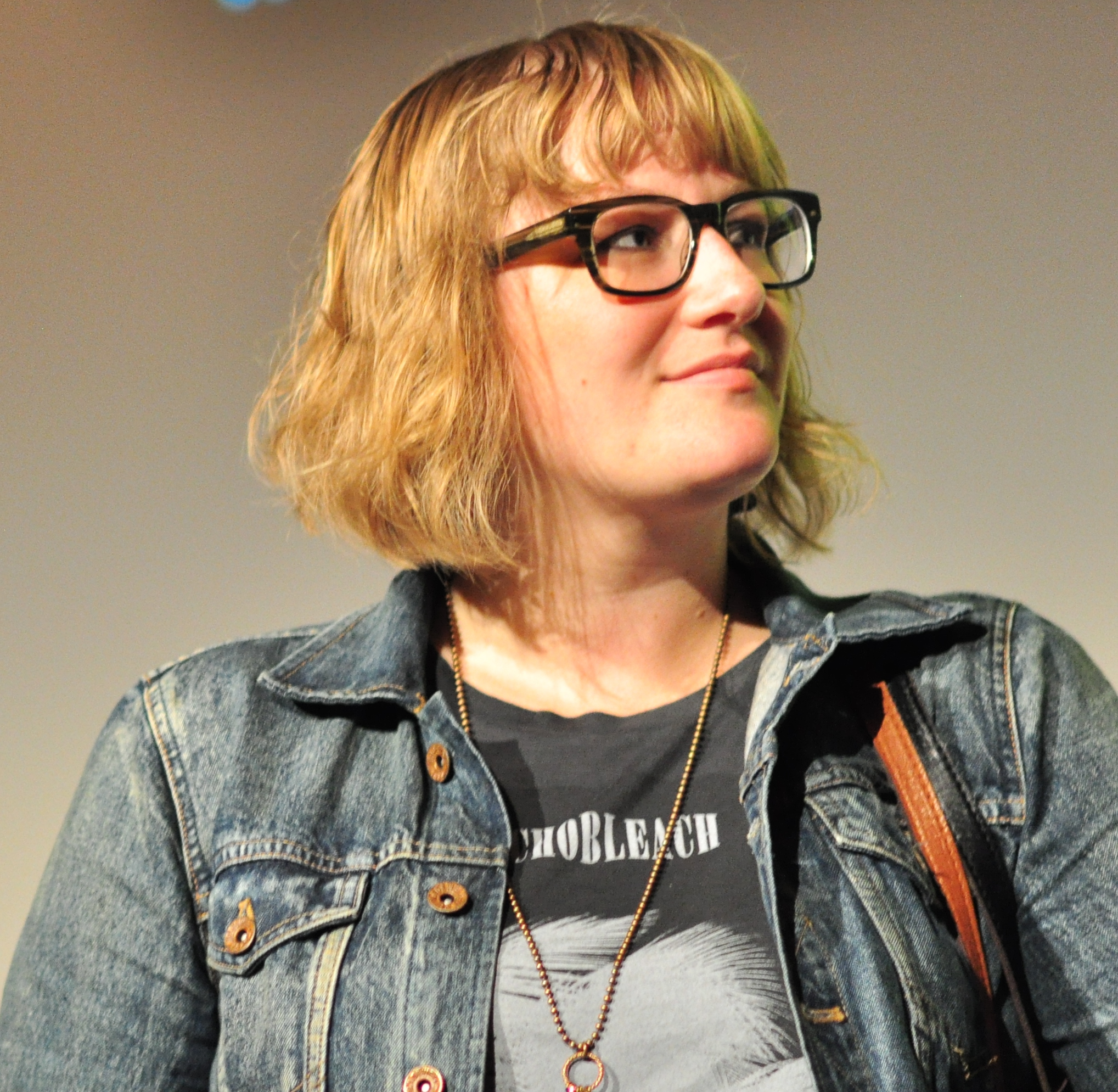
- Eslyn in 2015
- Occupations: Film producer, director, writer

Mel Eslyn (born August 19, 1983) is an American film producer, director and writer. She works primarily in the Seattle independent film industry and has collaborated with Lynn Shelton and Mark and Jay Duplass on numerous films. She is best known for producing The One I Love (2014) and Lamb (2015), for which she won an Independent Spirit Award. She acts as the President of Duplass Brothers Productions.

== Early life ==
Eslyn was born in 1983 in Menomonee Falls, Wisconsin. She attended Pewaukee High School and graduated in 2001. She was inspired to become a filmmaker after seeing the music video for "Somewhere Out There", a song from the animated film An American Tail. She worked on film sets in Milwaukee as a teenager, beginning at the age of 14, and was a production assistant on the 2002 film No Sleep 'til Madison.

== Career ==
Eslyn worked in the Madison, Wisconsin film industry before moving to Seattle in 2008. She entered the Seattle independent film industry through Seattle-based director Lynn Shelton and actor Mark Duplass, whom she befriended while working on their 2009 film Humpday. Eslyn went on to co-produce Shelton's films Your Sister's Sister (2011) and Touchy Feely (2013) and was the line producer on Shelton's 2014 film Laggies. She produced The One I Love (2014), directed by Charlie McDowell and financed by Duplass Brothers Productions, and Lamb (2015), written and directed by Ross Partridge. In 2015, she was hired by Duplass Brothers Productions to oversee the production of the company's low-budget films; Eslyn refers to Mark and Jay Duplass as her own "big brothers".

Eslyn won the Piaget Producers Award with a $25,000 grant at the 31st Independent Spirit Awards for her work on The One I Love and Lamb. She was also twice nominated for a Genius Award by the Seattle newspaper The Stranger in 2015 and again in 2016.

In 2017, Eslyn took over as President of Duplass Brothers Productions, overseeing all film and television content.

Eslyn's directorial debut film Biosphere, starring Mark Duplass and Sterling K. Brown, was released in 2022.

== Personal life ==
Eslyn is in a relationship with Nathan M. Miller, a cinematographer with whom she worked on Lamb, Outside In and Humpday.

== Accolades ==
Year	Award	Category	Nominee(s)	Result	Ref.
2016	Independent Spirit Awards	Piaget Producer's Award	Lamb	Won	
2022	Peabody Awards	Entertainment	Somebody Somewhere	Nominated	
