= Cinema Toast =

- Series poster
- Created by: Jeff Baena
- Music by: Julian Wass; Keegan DeWitt; Sofia Frohna; Curtis Heath; Dan Romer; Josiah Steinbrick; Jeremy Zuckerman
- Country of origin: United States
- No. of seasons: 1
- No. of episodes: 10

Production
- Executive producers: Jeff Baena; Jay Duplass; Mark Duplass; Mel Eslyn; Tyler Romary
- Producer: Shuli Harel
- Editors: Ryan Brown; Jamin Bricker; Amelia Allwarden; Stephanie Kaznocha
- Production company: Duplass Brothers Productions

Original release
- Network: Showtime
- Release: April 20 – May 18, 2021

Cinema Toast is a 2021 television anthology series created by Jeff Baena and Duplass Brothers Productions, which aired on Showtime. Its standalone episodes use footage from old films re-cut and overlaid with new dialogue from various stars to tell new stories. Each episode has a different director and writers. As well as executive producing the series, Baena wrote and directed the first episode.

== Production ==
When the COVID-19 pandemic shut down film production, Baena had to pause production of Spin Me Round, which he had been going to shoot in Italy. During lockdown, Baena and his partner Aubrey Plaza watched a lot of old films. He "racked [his] brain to find a way to still create", coming up with the idea to take public domain footage and re-shape it "into something transcendent that extends beyond just a comedic curio." During an online poker game in March 2020, Baena joked to his friends that he was considering making something similar to Woody Allen's 1966 film What's Up, Tiger Lily?, which had re-cut and overdubbed a then-recent film. His friends found the idea funny, and later that night he started seriously considering it; he planned to rework old footage into new genres, without being ironic or mocking the re-creation process. He said that he did not want to make something like Mystery Science Theater 3000. He then proposed it to Plaza as an overdubbing project, though they felt "the rules [were] limitless" with what they could actually do with the material, and brought in the Duplass brothers, his producers for Horse Girl and Spin Me Round.

The producers wanted to intentionally diversify the directors and actors involved, in comparison to the predominantly white and male creators of the public domain footage being used, and committed to at least 50% female directors and using people of color as voice actors.

Baena also wanted to improve the reputation of public domain films and inspire people to engage with classic cinema, saying that the status can be treated "like an orphanage" and citing how classic films have often lapsed into the public domain because of administration or legal issues. He had initially planned to use Invasion of the Bee Girls for his episode, but during pre-production it began streaming on Amazon Prime Video; streaming platforms often take advantage of public domain films, with Baena also surprised that Night of the Living Dead was available to use. He had worked with a licensing service to search vast collections of different public domain material, with about 800 to choose from; Showtime later licensed a selection of movies for the project.

The filmmakers for the project were predominantly people Baena already knew, half of whom were on board by May 2020. With names connected and a structure in place, the producers pitched the project and sold it to Showtime in the summer of 2020. Baena shared the footage with the writers and directors for them to all "create a totally original story", and matched them each with editors. The writer-directors approached the project differently, with some (like Baena) finding a single film and cutting it to create a new narrative, others writing an original story and "then [going] on a detective spree to find footage" that would fit, and Plaza focusing on one actress (Loretta Young) and the available footage of her. Recording began in around October 2020.

In preparing his episode, Baena watched the film (ultimately choosing Made for Each Other) without sound, so he could both get a sense of the story and project his own ideas onto it; he had two days to write his episode between Invasion of the Bee Girls being purchased by Amazon and his scheduled recording session. Plaza made her directorial debut by creating an episode, only agreeing to do it because she became inspired by footage of Loretta Young in Eternally Yours while watching the pre-cleared material. Though Plaza had planned to make something comedic, her episode was much darker, which she joked may have been because 2020 was so dark but also reflected was based on researching Young and "reading things that were truly disturbing." Mel Eslyn, an executive producer who was also given the chance to write and direct, was inspired by the question of "what happens after the credits roll", re-cutting Beast from Haunted Cave to show monster hunters struggle with PTSD after their mission. Episode "The Cowboy President", written by Ethan Sandler and Jay Duplass, is based on a true story of agents considering if Ronald Reagan was unfit to be president.

== Release ==
Showtime ordered ten episodes; all written and directed by different independent filmmakers, the series is in anthology format. The ten episodes were all released for streaming on April 20, 2021, and were aired weekly in pairs on Showtime, starting April 20. It was available to stream on Crave in Canada at the same time.

The series aired on Paramount+ in Nordic regions from July 1, 2021, and on M-Net in South Africa weekly on Fridays from November 26, 2021.

== Episodes ==
No.	Title	Directed by	Written by	Voice cast	Music	Original release date	Editing
1	"Familiesgiving"	Jeff Baena	Jeff Baena	Alison Brie as Jane; John Reynolds as Johnny; Megan Mullally as Eunice Doolittle; Nick Offerman as Don Doolittle; Fred Armisen as Radio Voice and Rick; Lauren Weedman as Annie the Housekeeper	Dan Romer	April 20, 2021	Ryan Brown
2	"Report on the Canine Auto-Mechanical Soviet Threat"	Alex Ross Perry	Alex Ross Perry	Eric Stoltz as Presenter; Griffin Newman as Herbie; Dasha Nekrasova as Marushka; Jason Alan Carvell; Jennifer Hale	Keegan DeWitt	April 20, 2021	Ryan Brown
3	"Quiet Illness"	Aubrey Plaza	Aubrey Plaza	Christina Ricci; Hamish Linklater; Aubrey Plaza as Karen; Darcy Fowler; Seth Kirschner; Percy Daggs IV	Josiah Steinbrick; Jeremy Zuckerman	April 27, 2021	Amelia Allwarden
4	"After the End"	Mel Eslyn	Mel Eslyn	Sunita Mani; Dan Stevens as Antoni; Matthew Gray Gubler as Jeremy; Luka Jones as Willy; Allan McLeod as Paddy; Alycia Delmore	Julian Wass	April 27, 2021	Stephanie Kaznocha
5	"The Cowboy President"	Jay Duplass	Ethan Sandler (teleplay); Jay Duplass & Ethan Sandler (story)	John Early as Joe Bunker; Kate Berlant as Stacey Breen; Ethan Sandler; Kelvin Yu; Jay Duplass	TBA	May 4, 2021	TBA
6	"Kiss, Marry, Kill"	Numa Perrier	Numa Perrier	Da'Vine Joy Randolph as Vivian; Dana Caldwell as Sorcerer; Colman Domingo as Barrington; Lorraine Toussaint as Mother	Julian Wass	May 4, 2021	Jamin Bricker
7	"Warehouse Friends"	Kris Rey	Kris Rey	Jake Johnson as Steve; Gillian Jacobs; Nicole Byer as Dorothy; Kate Micucci; Naomi Ekperigin as Sophia; Alia Shawkat; Lindsay Burdge as Warehouse Supervisor; Philip Ettinger as Man	Julian Wass	May 11, 2021	Jamin Bricker
8	"Attack of the Karens"	Marta Cunningham	Marta Cunningham	Marcus Henderson as Malik; Marianne Rendón as Karen; Nija Okoro as Tanya; Juanita Jennings as Gladys; Maurice Williams as Roy; Michael Chernus as Man; Shawn Pelofsky as Woman; Robin Atkin Downes as Newsman	Sofia Frohna	May 11, 2021	Jamin Bricker
9	"One Gay Wedding and a Thousand Funerals"	Jordan Firstman	Jordan Firstman & Starlee Kine	Chloe Fineman as Holly; Christopher Meloni; Jordan Firstman as Sebastian; Laura Benanti; Sam Pancake; Diedrich Bader; Ruby McCollister	TBA	May 18, 2021	Ryan Brown
10	"The Gunshot Heard 'Round the World"	David Lowery	David Lowery & James M. Johnston	Dan Donohue as Roland; Hugo Armstrong; Kalean Ung	Curtis Heath	May 18, 2021	Ryan Brown

== Response ==
Christian Gallichio for The Playlist wrote that "each episode wildly careens through interests, genres, and even forms with decidedly mixed results"; he highlighted some stand-out episodes but felt that audience views would differ based on tastes; he concluded that it was "one of the better pandemic-inspired projects to emerge." Mashable's Belen Edwards wrote that the show was "something wonderful and slightly insane, with large amounts of emotional complexity at its heart." Jade Budowski of Decider "was pleasantly surprised" by the show's uniqueness, quality editing, and social commentary in short episodes, especially in an over-saturated streaming landscape. She agreed that different episodes may appeal to different viewers, thinking this was a benefit of the series, and praised the casting of voice actors.

ScreenAnarchy's Shelagh Rowan-Legg felt that "the series works best when it's the most experimental in the selected clips and how they are re-configured into a new story", highlighting certain episodes for their particularly creative uses of film form and criticizing several of the others for being less inventive. She said that the voice performances were strong, but most episodes would be better if they were shorter. Aaron Barnhart for Primetimer enjoyed that the show "[swung] tonally from Adult Swim sarcasm to TV-drama poignant". He thought it was smart to have Baena's episode, which he described as the most accessible of the show, as the first before being followed by Alex Ross Perry's much weirder episode. Barnhart was less impressed by episodes which used "the obvious gags", but opined that any thoughts of unevenness "would miss the point of why [the series] was made in the first place."
