= Jeff Baena =

American screenwriter and film director (1977–2025)

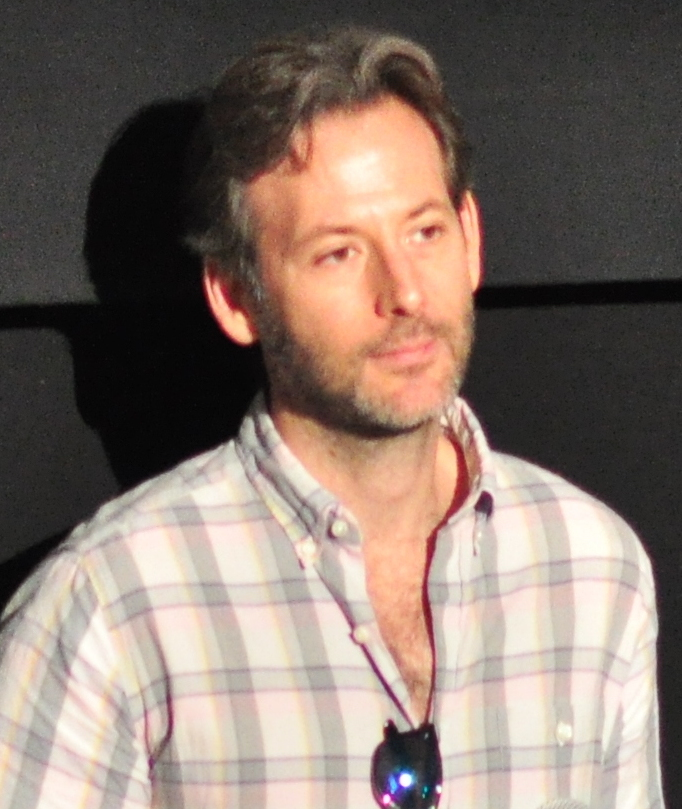
- Baena at the 2017 Seattle International Film Festival
- Born: Jeffrey Lance Baena; June 29, 1977; Miami, Florida, U.S.
- Died: January 3, 2025 (aged 47); Los Angeles, California, U.S.
- Education: New York University
- Occupations: Director; screenwriter
- Spouse: Aubrey Plaza (m. 2021; sep. 2024)

Jeffrey Lance Baena (/ˈbeɪnə/ BAY-nə; June 29, 1977 – January 3, 2025) was an American screenwriter and film director. His most successful films were 2004's I Heart Huckabees and 2020's Horse Girl, though his projects to receive the most contemporaneous critical acclaim were the 2016 and 2017 films Joshy and The Little Hours. Baena frequently worked with his wife, Aubrey Plaza, and writing partner Alison Brie.

He began his career as a screenwriter, co-writing the 2004 comedy film I Heart Huckabees and, around the same time, seeing his script for Life After Beth enter production before being shelved. Baena, as an independent filmmaker, expanded to directing a decade later and filmed Life After Beth as his directorial debut, starring Aubrey Plaza and released in 2014. Working with producer Liz Destro, Plaza, and an expanding group of frequent collaborators, Baena was then writer-director for Joshy (2016) and The Little Hours (2017), which both became critically acclaimed and found a cult audience.

Among the performers in these films was Alison Brie, with whom Baena struck up a writing partnership and created works produced by Duplass Brothers Productions. They made the 2020 psychological drama film Horse Girl together, Baena's most commercial film, followed by the television anthology series Cinema Toast (2021) and Baena's final film, 2022's Spin Me Round. His first films implement his post-mumblecore style as an improvisation-heavy filmmaker, and his films co-written with Brie are marked by exploration of expectations in film form.

== Early life and education ==
Jeffrey Lance Baena was born in Miami on June 29, 1977, to Barbara (later Stern) and Scott Baena. He was raised in a secular Jewish family in the suburbs of Kendall and Coral Gables, where he enjoyed being surrounded by Latin and Caribbean cultures; he later said that he "felt a sense of community" there, a contrast to the negative perception of drug cartel violence. Baena's great-grandparents, who were Spanish speakers born in Turkey, had owned a farm in upstate New York; his parents were from New York City and had moved to Miami due to his father's work. His father is a lawyer who was appointed to the Committee for Economic Development by Richard Nixon as a college senior before moving into bankruptcy law. Baena's parents were divorced, which he credited in part with informing his dark sense of comedy. His first stepmother was manic depressive and, under Florida's Baker Act, was frequently institutionalized but then released, with Baena later commenting on systemic challenges in mental health care. He had a brother and two step-siblings.

After attending Killian High School, Baena graduated from the New York University Tisch School of the Arts with a degree in film, before moving to Los Angeles to pursue directing. Without planning to do so, he achieved a minor in medieval studies at NYU after taking multiple classes when he "was hard-core into the alchemy shit". He also took classes relating to philosophy.

== Career ==
=== 1999–2012: Early career ===
Baena was a production assistant for filmmaker Robert Zemeckis on What Lies Beneath and Cast Away (both 2000). The films were shot back-to-back and Zemeckis then took a production break, causing Baena to seek other employment. He became an assistant editor and, later, personal assistant for writer-director David O. Russell. Baena was originally hired to help edit an online documentary, Benny Hernandez, before Russell asked him to contribute some writing ideas for it; the project was ultimately left unfinished. After a year and a half of working together, a minor car accident injured one of Baena's eyes. Partially to keep his spirits up and pass the time during his recovery, Russell began discussing story ideas with Baena. The two ended up collaborating on four scripts together, including I Heart Huckabees, which Russell directed in 2004, and Jay Roach's Meet the Fockers (also 2004), for which they made uncredited revisions. The philosophical I Heart Huckabees was noted for the ambition in its storytelling; it was not a commercial success, and polarized critics. By 2005 it had become a cult hit, and soon found a place in the pop culture zeitgeist. In 2023, Robbie Collin and Tim Robey wrote in The Telegraph that it was one of the best box-office bombs, citing its rewatchability two decades later.

Before he began directing, Baena continued working as a screenwriter, mostly for studio assignments and rewrites. Warner Bros. Pictures appointed him the screenwriter for the comedy The Awakening of Jean-Luc Barbara in 2006, which was still in development in 2010. He performed rewrites on Rami and Etan Cohen's Revenge of the Jocks, a reverse take on Revenge of the Nerds, in 2011. At the same time he was writing an indie adaptation of the Ernest Hemingway memoir A Moveable Feast. Having always wanted to be a director, Baena considered screenwriting "a means to an end" and was critical of his own writing ability. In 2012, he co-judged a short film script competition curated by Roman Coppola, and played a fictionalized version of himself in the film The End of Love; a dramatization of actor Mark Webber's life, Baena appeared in The End of Love alongside Aubrey Plaza, his partner and Webber's Scott Pilgrim vs. the World co-star.

=== 2012–2017: Directorial debut and producing with Destro ===
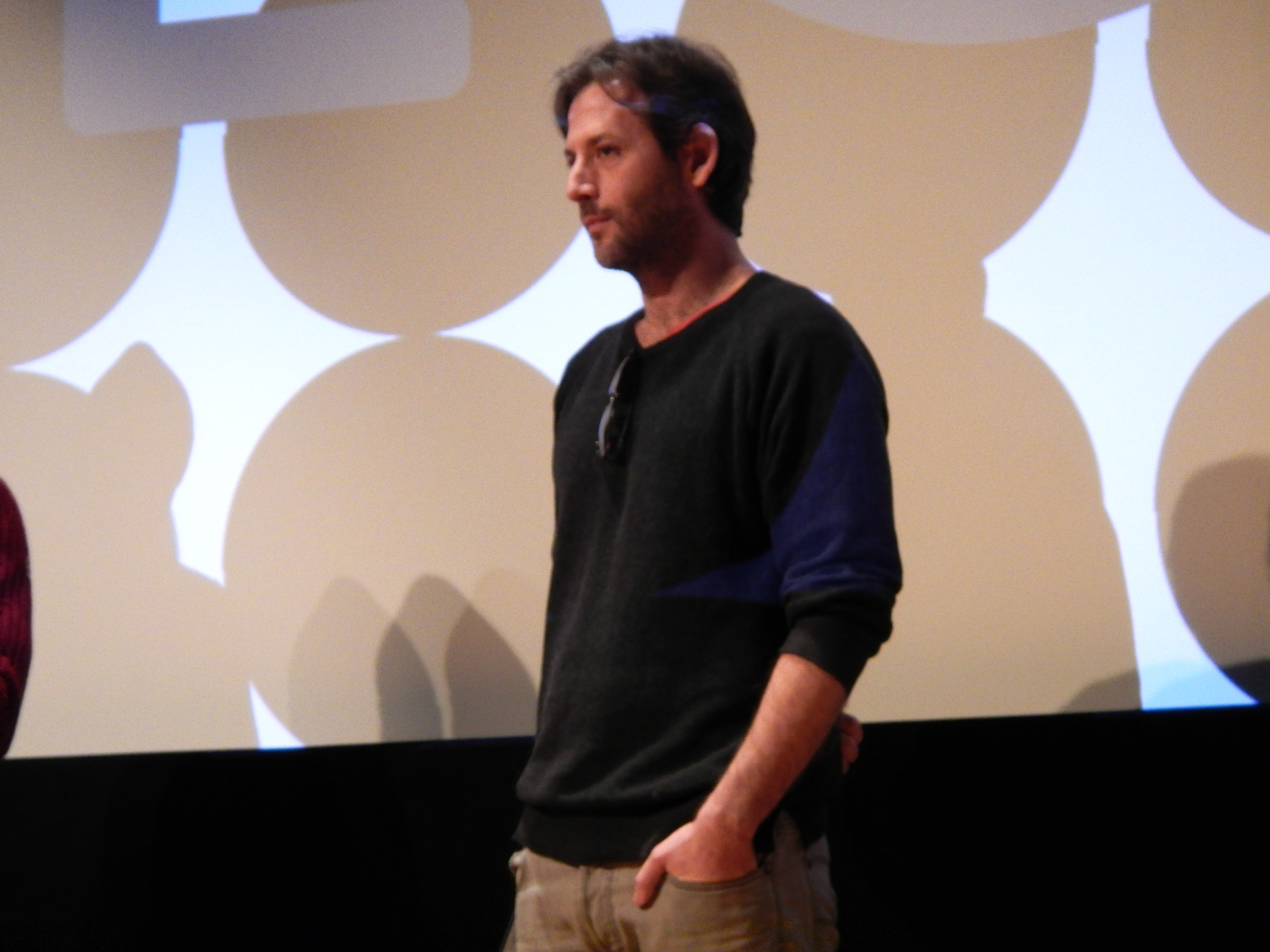
Baena at the 2014 Sundance Film Festival

Baena had planned for the comedy-drama Joshy to be his directorial debut, but actor and collaborator Adam Pally had to postpone for personal reasons. Baena then decided to work on the zombie comedy Life After Beth, from a script he started writing in 2003, which became his debut. This film had been in production but shelved shortly after it was written, and was only picked back up after comic actress Aubrey Plaza was looking for a role and her agent remembered the script; with Plaza attached, the production resumed. Flavorwire wrote that "Baena's control of the material is occasionally uncertain", while Mark Kermode felt Baena "kept things just the right side of believable, eschewing explanation in favour of cracked domesticity." Life After Beth received mixed reviews; the Rotten Tomatoes (RT) critics' consensus suggested the idea was too thin to sustain a whole film, though bolstered by Plaza's performance. In 2016, it was ranked the 38th best-ever zombie film and described as both "the best zom-rom-com since Shaun Of The Dead" and a "mumblecore relationship break-up zomcom". It premiered at the Sundance Film Festival in 2014, the same festival at which Joshy, as Baena's second film, premiered in 2016.

After Life After Beth, Baena worked on adapting Lysergic, the autobiography of Krystle Cole that he had optioned, and suggested he might like to direct Doctor Strange as he was a fan of the character. When production resumed on Joshy, Baena provided his large comedic cast with a 20-page outline, rather than a script, as an experiment to "keep people in the moment." Baena did not audition but cast people he knew would be able to work in such a film. The film's RT critics' consensus highlighted Baena's direction for "strik[ing] a unique, disarmingly heartfelt blend of dark humor and tragedy". The Los Angeles Times praised that despite its improvisational nature, "the film never feels unfocused or messy"; Christy Lemire felt Baena's work had improved since his debut; and Glenn Kenny noted Baena's skill in tonally dictating his film. Joshy was ranked the fifth best ever mumblecore film separately by screenwriter Jason Hellerman and critic Mike Bedard, with Bedard also describing it as "post-mumblecore".

Jake Johnson as well as some of Baena's filmmaker friends had acting roles in Joshy; the previous year, Baena had similarly made a cameo in Johnson's 2015 film Digging for Fire, the premise of which was based on the strange things found when Johnson, Baena and friends had dug out Johnson's garden. Joshy was Baena's first film to feature actress Alison Brie, albeit briefly, before she had a main role in his third film, the 2017 black comedy The Little Hours. Plaza also starred in The Little Hours, for whom it was her producing debut. She produced alongside Liz Destro of Destro Films, who had produced Baena's previous films; Baena only proceeded to develop The Little Hours after pitching it to Destro. Inspired by passages from The Decameron, which Baena had studied, the film was again largely improvised and based in the disconnect of medieval beliefs to modern ones; Baena saw the potential for humor and tragedy in this idea. Reviews were impressed with how well the concept worked, and praised Baena's comedic direction, with Mick LaSalle writing that "Baena combines a zany comic vision with a rare control of tone. [...] There's no winking or nudging, no straining for laughs. Baena devised the material, and he trusts it."

=== 2018–2022: Creative partnership with Alison Brie ===
Baena directed Brie two more times in the films Horse Girl (2020) and Spin Me Round (2022), which they co-wrote together. The latter also featured Plaza. Both actresses were involved in different capacities in Baena's only television work, Cinema Toast, a 2021 anthology series that he created and executive produced. Baena wrote and directed episodes in the series, which reinterpreted public domain footage to tell modern stories. Baena and Brie were among the producers for Cinema Toast and both of their co-written films, all of which were executive produced by the Duplass Brothers.

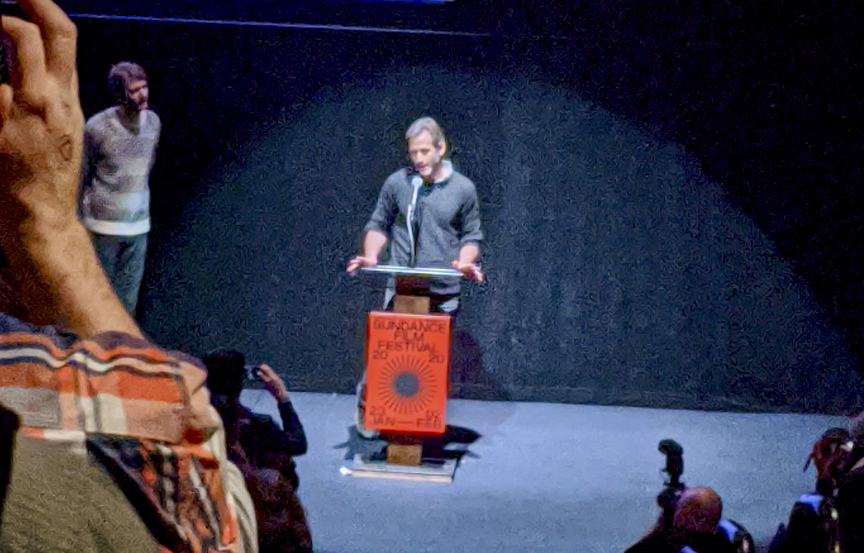
Baena at the premiere of Horse Girl

Having formed a friendship after working on previous movies, and knowing of the creative risks Baena liked to take, Brie pitched the idea for a drama about fear of mental illness to him while on a hike. He had been suggesting that she play a "horse girl" character, and they realized they could combine the ideas to create what became Horse Girl. The pair pitched it to the Duplass Brothers, who joined and offered it to Netflix. Baena and Brie wrote the screenplay together, and some of the film's dialogue was improvised. After premiering at Sundance in 2020, Horse Girl began streaming on Netflix and was the most commercially successful of Baena's works. Reviews noted the use and subversion of form to inform the story, which was generally praised but also criticized by Adrian Horton in The Guardian.

The pair again chose to subvert expectations in Spin Me Round, the shoot of which was postponed due to the COVID-19 pandemic in Italy. They used the delay to expand the film outline into a more detailed script. The film combined comedy and thriller genres, and critics noted the story for "a provocative #MeToo statement". Spin Me Round saw mixed reviews, its RT critics' consensus saying that "it never quite lives up to its potential" but is nevertheless enjoyable and elevated by Plaza and Brie. The Hollywood Reporter felt it was "amusing but the most lightweight" of Baena's films.

=== Style ===
In his own words, Baena described his films as "destabilizing, unmoored, and full of chaos"; William Deresiewicz wrote they are "odd, generically hybrid, tonally complex". Ryan Gilbey wrote in an obituary for The Guardian that despite some similarities and all sharing "some unforeseen emotional kick, the subjects and styles [of Baena's films] were strikingly dissimilar"; Gilbey added that Baena planned this intention, as he did not want to do the same thing more than once. Baena enjoyed creative freedom to mix genres and expectations, and preferred not to use labels for his works so as to not create generic expectations. He was considered one of the prominent filmmakers of the mumblecore subgenre. His films found a cult audience, while critics acknowledged his consistent attention to topics that were not frequently tackled in Hollywood movies: Baena's films broadly deal with themes of grief, loss, love and mental health.

He "never really audition[ed], ever" for his films, saying he was inspired by Federico Fellini choosing performers based on seeing them in a more natural setting than a line reading. Baena created ideas of characters then, once he knew which actors he would use, would "try to build the part around them, and ... make it more true." He ended up with a group of frequent collaborators, particularly Brie, Plaza, Molly Shannon, Lauren Weedman and Paul Reiser (who each starred in four of his five films) – this was primarily because Baena enjoyed working with them and wanted to bring out new things from actors he enjoyed. In discussing his actor collaborations, Baena cited an ability to move seamlessly between comedy and drama as a common attribute. He also found it advantageous to work with familiar actors due to his own "slightly nontraditional way" of writing and directing, so that he could rely on performers who understood his process. Baena typically wrote and worked from film outlines, rather than full screenplays, so his films could incorporate improvisation, though his first and final films, Life After Beth and Spin Me Round, were more traditional.

=== Frequent collaborators ===
Frequent actor collaborations (2 or more projects)
Work Actor	The End of Love (Mark Webber, 2012)	Life After Beth (2014)	Digging for Fire (Joe Swanberg/Jake Johnson, 2015)	Joshy (2016)	The Little Hours (2017)	Horse Girl (2020)	Cinema Toast (2021)	Spin Me Round (2022)	Total projects
Aubrey Plaza	Herself	Beth		Jen	Producer Fernanda		Writer-director Karen	Kat	6
Alison Brie				Rachel	Alessandra	Writer, producer Sarah	Jane	Writer, producer Amber	5
Lauren Weedman				Isadora	Francesca	Cheryl	Annie the Housekeeper	Liz	5
Jake Johnson	Himself		Writer, producer Tim	Reggie			Steve		4
Paul Reiser		Noah		Steve	Ilario	Gary			4
Molly Shannon		Geenie			Marea	Joan		Deb	4
Alia Shawkat	Herself	Roz					Actor (unnamed role)		3
Paul Weitz		Mr. Levin		Private investigator	Lurco				3
Adam Pally		Diner sommelier		Producer Ari	Guard Paolo				3
Nick Offerman		Documentary narrator			Lord Bruno		Don Doolittle		3
Matthew Gray Gubler		Kyle				Darren Colt (character in Purgatory)	Jeremy		3
Fred Armisen					Bishop Bartolomeo		Radio voice Rick	Ricky	3
Frankie Shaw	Evelyn			Crystal					2
Anna Kendrick		Erika	Alicia						2
John C. Reilly		Maury			Father Tommasso				2
Jenny Slate			Yoga couple	Jodi					2
Luis Fernandez-Gil				The Spaniard		Tow worker			2
Kate Micucci					Ginevra		Actor (unnamed role)		2
John Reynolds						Darren	Johnny		2
Jay Duplass						Ethan	Writer-director, producer Actor (unnamed role)		2
Debby Ryan						Nikki		Susie	2
Jake Picking						Brian		Jake	2

== Personal life and death ==
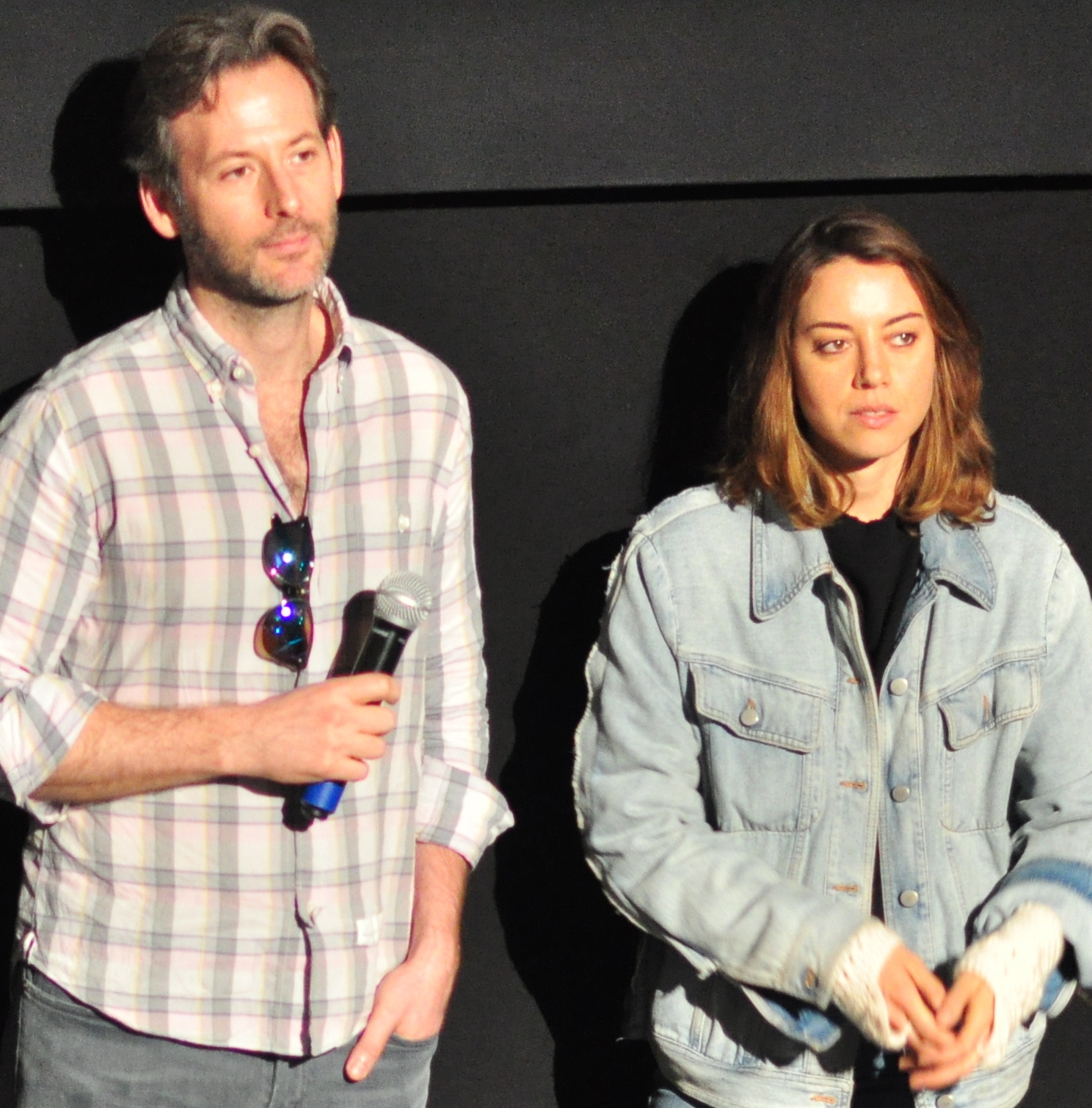
Baena and Plaza in 2017

Baena hosted game nights for filmmakers and friends. He met actress Aubrey Plaza during a game night in 2011, after which they began dating. Baena proposed to Plaza at a site related to the Basque witch trials in Zugarramurdi. To celebrate their tenth anniversary together, they married in 2021, in a small ceremony in their own backyard. They separated in September 2024, with Plaza staying in New York. Baena began attending therapy in October after he made "concerning remarks" to Plaza, which prompted her to call a friend to perform a welfare check on him.

On January 3, 2025, Baena's body was discovered at his home in Los Angeles by his dog walker; he was last known to be alive at 10:36 a.m. EST (07:36 PST) that morning. He was pronounced dead at the scene. The Los Angeles County medical examiner reported the cause of death as suicide by hanging. Baena was 47. According to the medical examiner's report, Baena had no previous suicide attempts. The 82nd Golden Globe Awards ceremony was held on January 5, with Best Director winner Brady Corbet paying tribute to Baena at the end of his acceptance speech; Plaza had been set to present at the ceremony but did not appear. Baena's funeral took place on January 10, 2025, in Miami. The 2026 film Primetime is dedicated to Baena.

== Filmography ==
=== As creator ===
Film

Year	Title	Director	Writer	Producer	Ref.
2004	I Heart Huckabees	No	Yes	No	
2004	Meet the Fockers	No	Uncredited	No	
2014	Life After Beth	Yes	Yes	No	
2016	Joshy	Yes	Yes	No	
2017	The Little Hours	Yes	Yes	No	
2020	Horse Girl	Yes	Yes	Yes	
2022	Spin Me Round	Yes	Yes	Yes	

Television

Year	Title	Director	Writer	Creator	Executive Producer	Notes	Ref.
2021	Cinema Toast	Yes	Yes	Yes	Yes	Wrote and directed episode "Familiesgiving"	

=== Others ===
Acting roles

Year	Title	Role	Ref.
2012	The End of Love	Himself	
2015	Digging for Fire	BB Gun Friend	

Other credits

Year	Title	Credit	Ref.
2000	What Lies Beneath	Production assistant	
2000	Cast Away	Production assistant: Fiji	
2014	Lennon or McCartney	Self	
2018	Duck Butter	Thanks	
2018	Madeline's Madeline	Thanks	
2022	Emily the Criminal	Special thanks	

=== Unrealized projects ===
Year	Project	Notes	Ref.
2000	Benny Hernandez	An online documentary by David O. Russell, with writing input from Baena	
2001–2004	Dr. Zinkin Goes for It	Baena and Russell collaborated on a number of scripts, including Dr. Zinkin Goes for It which they adapted from the novel Henry's List of Wrongs	
2006–2010	The Awakening of Jean-Luc Barbara	Baena wrote the Warner Bros. Pictures–Tapestry Films "battle-of-the-sexes" comedy, to be directed by Justin Reardon. Produced by Andrew Panay, Peter Abrams, Robert L. Levy, and executive produced by Michael Schreiber.	
2011–2012	Revenge of the Jocks	Baena made credited rewrites to a film script written by Rami and Etan Cohen, a reversal of the concept of Revenge of the Nerds, originally picked up in 2009. Jeff Tremaine was attached as director, with Tapestry's Abrams, Levy and Panay as producers, and Schreiber as executive producer; Sarah Schechter oversaw for Warner Bros.	
2011	Adaptation of A Moveable Feast	Baena was writing a film adaptation of the memoir for an independent production; rights had been picked up by Mariel Hemingway and producer John Goldstone in 2009.	
2014	Adaptation of Lysergic	Baena had optioned Lysergic, the autobiography of Gordon Todd Skinner's wife Krystle Cole about her experiences with him, and was writing an adaptation.	

== Accolades ==
Organization	Date of ceremony	Category	Work	Result	Ref.
Chlotrudis Society for Independent Films	2018	Best Adapted Screenplay	The Little Hours	Nominated	
Fangoria Chainsaw Awards	June 1, 2015	Best Screenplay	Life After Beth	Nominated	
Neuchâtel International Fantastic Film Festival	July 8, 2017	H. R. Giger Award "Narcisse" for Best Feature Film	The Little Hours	Nominated	
Sundance Film Festival	January 26, 2014	U.S. Grand Jury Prize: Dramatic	Life After Beth	Nominated	
Sundance Film Festival	January 31, 2016	U.S. Grand Jury Prize: Dramatic	Joshy	Nominated	
