= Spin Me Round =

2022 film by Jeff Baena

- Release poster
- Directed by: Jeff Baena
- Written by: Jeff Baena; Alison Brie
- Produced by: Jeff Baena; Alison Brie; Mel Eslyn; Chris Parker; Dylan Sellers
- Starring: Alison Brie; Alessandro Nivola; Molly Shannon; Lil Rel Howery; Aubrey Plaza
- Cinematography: Sean Mcelwee
- Edited by: Ryan Brown
- Music by: Pino Donaggio
- Production companies: Duplass Brothers Productions; Limelight
- Distributed by: IFC Films; AMC+
- Release dates: March 12, 2022 (SXSW); August 19, 2022 (United States)
- Running time: 104 minutes
- Country: United States
- Language: English

Spin Me Round is a 2022 American dark comedy film co-written by Jeff Baena and Alison Brie and directed by Baena, the final film he directed before his death in 2025. It premiered at the South by Southwest festival on March 12, 2022. It was released in the United States on August 19, 2022, by IFC Films in select theaters and by AMC+ on video on demand.

== Plot ==
Amber Ruffman is a dissatisfied manager at Tuscan Grove, an Italian chain restaurant in Bakersfield, California. After being recommended by her boss, Amber receives an all-expenses-paid trip to Italy to participate in Tuscan Grove's management program, and meet the CEO, Nick Martucci. Her friend Emily predicts that Amber will find love. Once in Italy, program supervisor Craig takes all the participants' passports. Despite the rustic images shown online, they stay in a company-owned motel, and are told they cannot leave the property without permission. The group begins classes with head chef Liz Bence, which are interrupted by the arrival of Nick and his assistant Kat. Nick reacts strangely upon meeting Amber, saying she resembles his late sister.

Kat pulls Amber out of the lesson and invites her to a bar in Lucca, but the plan is overheard by Deb, who tells the other managers, turning the outing into an evening at the "bar" on the Tuscan Grove campus. The following morning, Kat wakes Amber up early and drives her to a yacht, where Nick is waiting. The two have an intimate conversation and kiss. Nick then invites Amber to a party, but tells her not to tell the rest of the group. The next day, Kat takes Amber to the party in Rigoli, where she shares a dance with the host Ricky's son and as a result is accosted by his lover. Kat takes her from away from the party and to a club and diner. The two kiss, but Amber stops them; Kat tells Amber that Nick is selfish, and that Amber is not the only woman that he has done this with. Amber awakens the next morning alone in the van. Later that day, she sees Kat driving off with Susie.

Susie is not at the class the following day, and Jen soon leaves, leading Amber to share her suspicions that something is not right with fellow manager Dana. Dana suggests that Nick is the mastermind, but Amber refuses to believe it, blaming Kat. Dana sneaks into the program office and finds pictures of former members, almost all of whom are women. He speculates that he and Fran were chosen because their names caused them to be mistaken for women. Amber sees Nick leaving with Jen and follows them, confronting Nick at his yacht. Nick accuses Amber of trying to push him away, and reveals that he fired Kat, calling her unstable. Amber and Dana demand their passports back from Craig, who encourages them not to "rock the boat". After Nick arrives during a group game of Mafia, Dana confronts him about his impropriety. Nick breaks down, saying that he envisioned Tuscan Grove as a high-end restaurant, only for it to turn into a fast casual chain. In the evening, Dana sneaks out to a party at Nick's on-site villa, where he sees men with automatic weapons. He returns with Amber, and they see Liz Bence, who has not been seen in days, bound and gagged inside. Dana leaves to rescue her, but is heard screaming. When Amber arrives, she finds Deb kneeling over his unconscious body. She returns to the motel and gets Fran; the two of them discover what appears to be Jen's dead body in her bed.

Amber and Fran return to the villa and find a barely conscious Dana, who reveals that he was attacked by a pack of wild boars. They go into the villa to hide, but discover an orgy happening inside, attended by Nick, members of his family, Liz Bence, and attendees of Ricky's party, all filmed by Craig. The party is interrupted as the pack of boars stampede into the house, sending the guests scattering and allowing Amber to call the police. It is revealed that Jen was merely sleeping, not dead, and that Susie took a spontaneous trip to Genoa, explaining her disappearance. The members of the group return home, with Craig reminding them that they have all signed a non-disclosure agreements. Back in Bakersfield, Nick shows up unexpectedly at Tuscan Grove to ask for Amber's forgiveness, and for them to continue as a couple. She rebuffs him, and smiles as she returns to her work.

== Cast ==
- Alison Brie as Amber Ruffman
- Alessandro Nivola as Nick Martucci
- Fred Armisen as Ricky
- Tim Heidecker as Fran
- Tricia Helfer as Sofia
- Ayden Mayeri as Jen
- Ego Nwodim as Emily
- Jake Picking as Jake
- Debby Ryan as Susie
- Molly Shannon as Deb
- Ben Sinclair as Craig
- Lauren Weedman as Liz Bence
- Zach Woods as Dana
- Lil Rel Howery as Paul
- Aubrey Plaza as Kat

== Development and production ==
=== Writing ===
Jeff Baena first had the idea for Spin Me Round after filming The Little Hours (2017), when he read about an Italian restaurant chain hosting a managerial retreat in Italy that was well below expectations. Considering this a funny premise but wanting to write the extreme of how bad it could be, he followed the principle of argument reductio ad absurdum to develop ideas for the most absurd possible trip. He began writing it in 2016, producing a 15-page outline, and initially involved Alison Brie as a friend for input on "less-than-ideal suitors". The pair co-wrote the 2020 film Horse Girl together, before Baena "instinctively" took his outline of Spin Me Round to Brie to see if she would be interested in making it, and they added more detail to the outline together to bring it to 35 pages.

It was then supposed to be filmed in Italy in the summer of 2020; this was postponed due to the COVID-19 pandemic in Italy. Baena and Brie used the delay to expand the film outline into a more detailed script, primarily because they had the time, though Baena noted it was usually easier to get financing for a full screenplay. Actress Aubrey Plaza, also Baena's partner, gave notes on the screenplay, and all three were involved with the television show Cinema Toast that Baena produced as "a way to still create" without being able to enter production on Spin Me Round. Baena and Brie wrote the screenplay through conversations over Zoom; Brie said that since their creative process was just talking, it was little different from having written together in the same room before, though they were unable to go on walks together when stuck in a rut. Spin Me Round was announced in May 2021, when it entered production; it is intentionally set in 2017, to allude to the growth of the #MeToo movement; Brie said that this and the "corporate coercion conspiracy" were direct references to personal situations in her own history.

=== Theme ===
The film has been described as a comedy thriller, with Baena describing it as a work that used irony and prioritized characters as the driving force of the story. It intentionally plays with genre to inform its story; Brie described her and Baena's idea to have the characters' "emotions [dictate] the tone of the movie", saying they wrote it in the style of a romantic comedy when Brie's character Amber expected romance and more like a thriller when Amber was scared. They also decided to riff on the theme of subverting expectations in the film's story, too. Baena said that "the film is rooted in the expectation versus reality trope", which forms the basis for the main plot as well as other elements. The location itself is used to subvert expectations, the film operating to "dismantle the fantasy facade of the romanticized nation [of Italy]" at a time when media like House of Gucci and the second season of The White Lotus were being made there.

One of the subversive sub-plots – in which Amber unexpectedly "had more sparks with Kat" (Plaza) than Nick (Alessandro Nivola) – was influenced by Baena and Brie's awareness that Plaza's chemistry with the female main character in another film, Happiest Season, which also co-starred Brie, was more popular than the main character's love interest. Happiest Season "was definitely in [their] minds" when writing the character to be played by Plaza, whom they felt could bring the same to her part in Spin Me Round. Brie and Plaza had also planned for their characters in The Little Hours to share a sex scene and "elaborate backstory" but were unable to film this. For Brie's Amber, the scenes with Kat were intended to be more natural and fun as they are the only points in the film when she is not living by expectations. As well as contributing to the theme of subverting expectations, Baena wanted to write "something authentic and confusing" to highlight the moral gray zone of Kat's involvement in the story.

=== Casting ===
After having worked with a similar ensemble of frequent collaborators on his other independent films, Baena wanted "to tailor-[make] the characters towards the actors and assign the roles to reflect their range", knowing the skills and types of his performers and the time limitations in both preparation and filming they would experience. He also used conversations with his cast to help inform the characters they would play. As well as Brie once again in the main role and as Baena's co-writer, Plaza returned to act in the film – having not had a role in Horse Girl – with Nivola, Molly Shannon, and Lil Rel Howery also announced to be starring in May 2021. It marked the fourth time Baena had directed Brie, Plaza, and Shannon for the big screen. Though the only film Baena made with Nivola, Zach Woods, and Tim Heidecker, he had known them all for many years before bringing them into his cast. Ayden Mayeri, another newcomer to Baena's ensemble, starred alongside Shannon on I Love That for You.

[The roles are] more reflecting the range [the cast] can play, but their actual personalities inform it. I'm not a fan of having people play parts that are so wildly divergent from who they are. Not that these are who these people are, but there are aspects of them, and they're heightened. At the same time, these are very much characters in these actors' wheelhouse, and it's just easier for them to get to new places based on that for me.

— Jeff Baena, 2022

Though one of Baena's reasons to prefer improvised dialog was the authenticity in each character, which could have been lost when he and Brie wrote the full screenplay, he noted that the extra time they had and knowing their cast well allowed them to consider this and make adjustments in the script.

=== Filming ===
Filming began in Italy in June 2021 and lasted 22 days, despite having budgeted for 27 days with longer hours. Having a full script again and the limited shooting time, the cast predominantly stuck to the script, though they tried to allow the comedic cast to improvise and found that "sometimes it was easy to find spots for Molly Shannon to riff on certain beats."

== Release ==
Spin Me Round had its world premiere at the South by Southwest festival on March 12, 2022. It was released in the United States on August 19, 2022, by IFC Films in select theaters and by AMC+ on video on demand.

== Reception ==
On the review aggregator website Rotten Tomatoes, the film has an approval rating of 47% based on 86 reviews, with an average rating of 5.4/10. The website's critics consensus reads, "If it never quite lives up to its potential, Spin Me Round remains a dizzily diverting comedy elevated by Alison Brie and Aubrey Plaza's performances." On Metacritic, the film has a weighted average score of 58 out of 100 based on 23 critics, indicating "mixed or average" reviews.

Critics noted the story for "a provocative #MeToo statement". The Hollywood Reporter felt it was "amusing but the most lightweight" of Baena's films.

== See also ==
- List of films impacted by the COVID-19 pandemic
