= Made for Each Other (1939 film) =

1939 film by John Cromwell

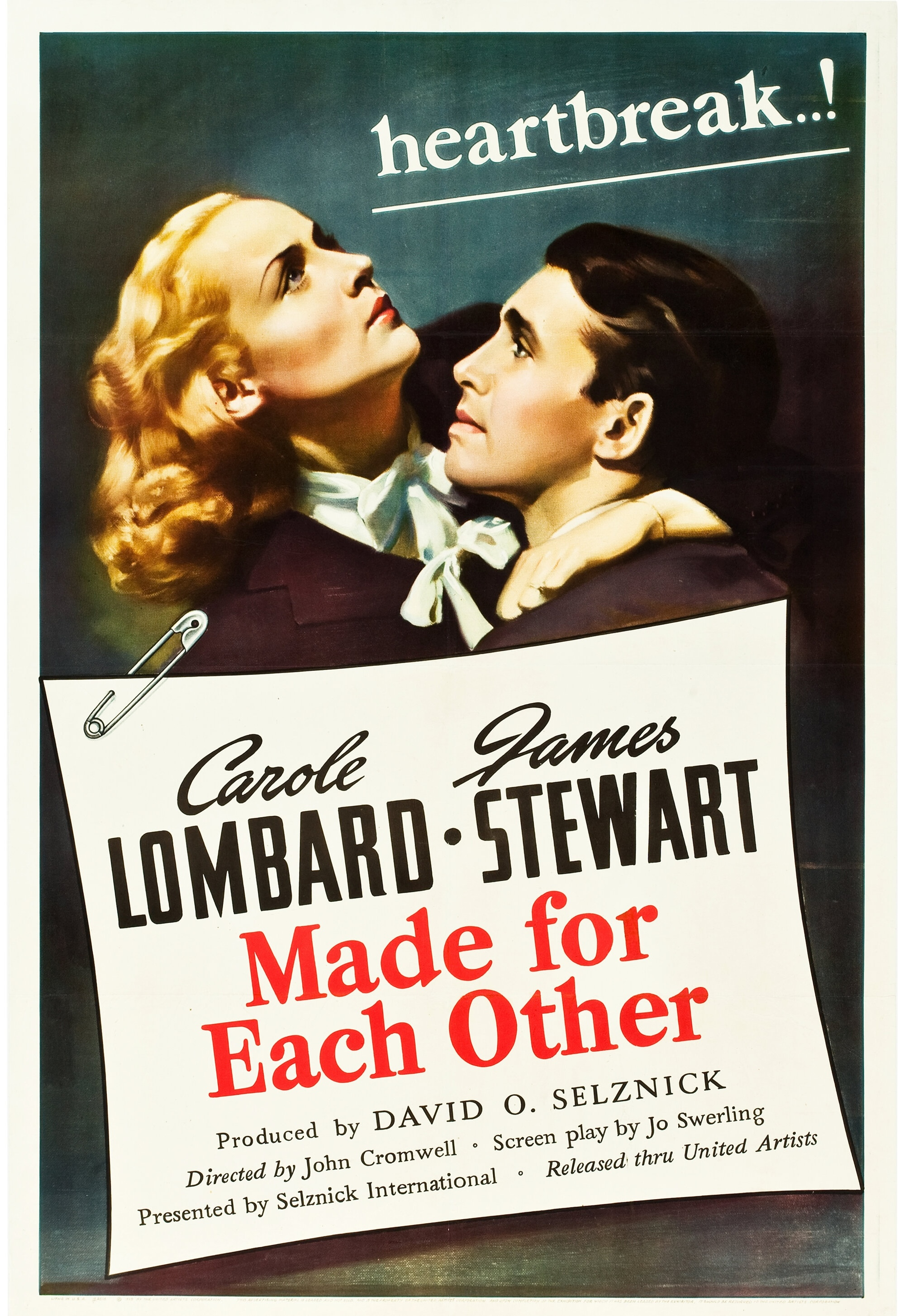
- Original theatrical poster
- Directed by: John Cromwell
- Screenplay by: Jo Swerling; Frank Ryan (uncredited)
- Story by: Rose Franken
- Produced by: David O. Selznick
- Starring: Carole Lombard; James Stewart; Charles Coburn
- Cinematography: Leon Shamroy
- Edited by: James E. Newcom
- Music by: Oscar Levant (uncredited)
- Production company: Selznick International Pictures
- Distributed by: United Artists
- Release date: February 3, 1939
- Running time: 93 minutes
- Country: United States
- Language: English

Made for Each Other is a 1939 American romantic comedy drama film directed by John Cromwell, produced by David O. Selznick, and starring Carole Lombard, James Stewart, and Charles Coburn. The film follows a couple who marry after only knowing each other for just one day and documents their tempestuous marriage amid the Great Depression.

The film is now in the public domain in the United States, and Disney owns the original film negative.

== Plot ==
Made for Each Other (1939)

John Mason is a milquetoast young attorney in New York City who works for Judge Doolittle. He has as a chance to become a partner at his law firm, especially if he marries Doolittle's daughter Eunice. However, John meets a woman named Jane during a business trip, and they fall in love and marry immediately. Eunice eventually marries Carter, another lawyer at the firm. John's impertinent mother is disappointed with his choice, and an important trial forces him to cancel the honeymoon. He wins the case, but by that time, Doolittle has chosen Carter as the new partner.

After they have a baby, Jane encourages John to demand a raise and a promotion, but with finances tightened by the Great Depression, Doolittle instead requires that all employees accept pay cuts. John becomes discouraged by his unpaid bills, and his mother, who lives with them in their small apartment, is destroying their marriage, causing a stream of housekeepers to quit. John's mother gives the baby a bad cold.

On New Year's Eve, the baby is rushed to the hospital with pneumonia. The baby will die within hours unless a serum is delivered by plane from Salt Lake City. Doolittle agrees to provide the $5,000 required to deliver the serum, but with a raging storm, the pilot refuses to fly. John pleads with the pilot by phone, and the pilot's friend takes the job. The small biplane encounters heavy snow and almost crashes in the mountains, and the engine catches fire over the Allegheny River, a short distance from New York City. The pilot escapes by parachute, clutching the serum, but he is injured on landing and rendered unconscious. He then crawls to a nearby farmhouse, where the farmer phones the hospital, and the baby is saved. A few months later, John is named as a partner at the law firm and his son speaks his first words.

== Cast ==
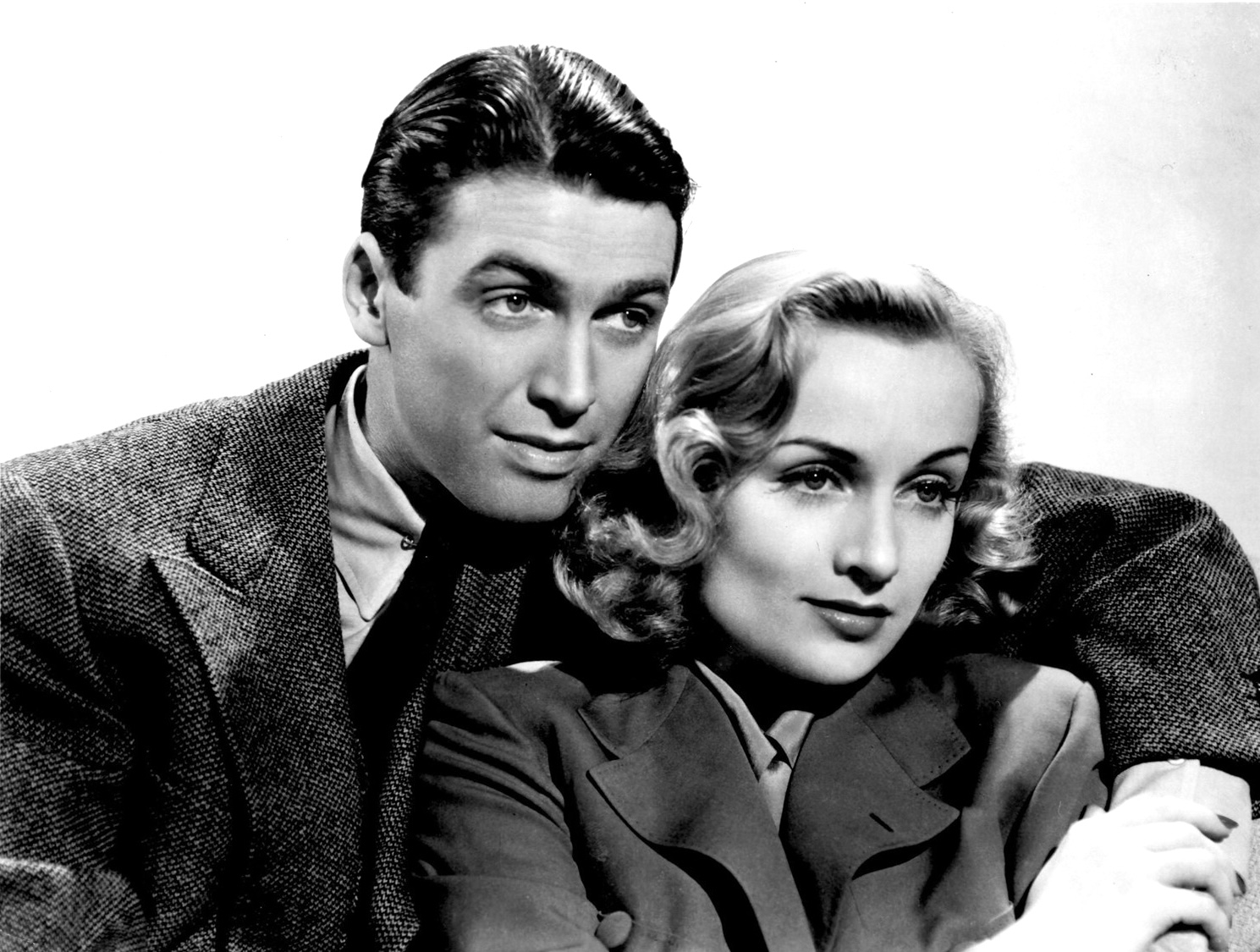
James Stewart and Carole Lombard in a publicity still

- Carole Lombard as Jane Mason
- James Stewart as John Horace Mason
- Charles Coburn as Judge Joseph M. Doolittle
- Lucile Watson as Mrs. Harriet Mason
- Eddie Quillan as Conway the pilot
- Alma Kruger as Sister Madeline
- Louise Beavers as Lily, Cook #3 (uncredited)
- Ward Bond as Jim Hatton (uncredited)
- Donald Briggs as Mr. Carter (uncredited)
- Esther Dale as Annie, Cook #1 (uncredited)
- Harry Davenport as Dr. Healy (uncredited)
- Fern Emmett as Famer's Wife (uncredited)
- Ruth Gillette as Tipsy Blonde at New Year's Eve Party (uncredited)
- Olin Howland as Farmer (uncredited)
- Nella Walker as Dr. Langham's Nurse-Receptionist (uncredited)
- Mary Field as Johns Hopkins technician (uncredited)
- Milburn Stone as Newark official (uncredited)

== Production ==
The film was listed as in-production in September 1938, with filming occurring at Selznick Studios in Culver City, California.

== Release ==
Made for Each Other had a preview screening at the Grauman's Chinese Theatre in Los Angeles on January 31, 1939. The film premiered in Miami, Florida, and Seattle, Washington on February 3, 1939, followed by a New York City premiere on February 17, 1939.

=== Home media and rights ===
Made for Each Other is in the public domain in the United States. Because of its public domain status, the film has been released in the home media market by numerous distributors. Anchor Bay Entertainment issued a digitally mastered VHS edition in 1999. MGM Home Entertainment released the film on DVD on October 19, 2004. On November 13, 2018, Kino Lorber released Blu-ray and DVD editions sourced from a new 2K scan of the original film elements.

The original film negative is owned by the Walt Disney Company. A 35 mm print of the film is held by the Museum of Modern Art, given by ABC Pictures International.

== Reception ==
=== Box office ===
The film lost $292,000 at the box office.

=== Critical response ===
Made for Each Other received favorable reviews from film critics at the time of its release. Frank S. Nugent of The New York Times called the film "thoroughly delightful". The film was also named one of the ten best films of 1939 by The New York Times.

Variety praised the film as "an exquisitely played, deeply moving comedy-drama... A happy combination of young love, sharp clean-cut humor and tearjerker." Time also offered a favorable review: "This mundane, domestic chronicle has more dramatic impact than all the hurricanes, sandstorms and earthquakes manufactured in Hollywood last season."

=== Accolades ===
Award/association	Year	Category	Recipient(s) and nominee(s)	Result	Ref.
Photoplay Awards	1939	Best Picture of the Month (April)	Made for Each Other	Won	
Photoplay Awards	1939	Best Performance of the Month (April)	Carole Lombard	Won	
Photoplay Awards	1939	Best Performance of the Month (April)	James Stewart	Won	
Photoplay Awards	1939	Best Performance of the Month (April)	Lucile Watson	Won	

== Related works ==
The film was re-edited into a 2021 short film by Jeff Baena for an episode of the Showtime anthology series Cinema Toast. The characters played by Lombard, Stewart, Charles Coburn, and Lucile Watson were dubbed by Alison Brie, John Reynolds, Nick Offerman, and Megan Mullally, respectively.

== See also ==
- List of American films of 1939

== Sources ==
- Eliot, Marc (2006). Jimmy Stewart: A Biography. New York City, New York: Harmony Books. ISBN 978-0-307-35268-2.
- Higgins, Steven (2006). Still Moving: The Film and Media Collections of the Museum of Modern Art. New York City, New York: Museum of Modern Art. ISBN 978-0-870-70326-3.
- Thomson, David (1992). Showman: The Life of David O. Selznick. New York City, New York: Alfred A. Knopf. ISBN 978-0-394-56833-1.
