= David O. Russell's unrealized projects =

During his career, film director David O. Russell has worked on a number of projects which never progressed beyond the pre-production stage under his direction. Some of these productions fell in development hell or were cancelled.

== 1990s ==
=== Untitled short film ===
In 1990, Russell wrote the script to a short film that was about Chinese fortune cookies. Specifically, it dealt with "a man who concealed microphones on every table in a Chinese restaurant, enabling him to eavesdrop and write insanely personal fortunes that eventually involve him in several people's lives," as described by Russell. He received grants from both the New York State Council on the Arts and the National Endowment for the Arts to make the film, but decided against it as he felt uncomfortable with the idea of making a short. After spending the next eighteen months morphing it into a feature, he gave up and opted to make Spanking the Monkey as his debut instead. The concept later served as the impetus for I Heart Huckabees.

=== Untitled Industrial Revolution epic ===
In the mid-1990s, prior to Three Kings, Russell had researched and planned a film epic set during the Industrial Revolution. He spoke of the project in 2011, during an interview conducted by Spike Jonze:

"Weirdly, I was researching a movie that turned out to be a lot like There Will Be Blood. I was researching [a story] about a father and a son that at the beginning of the oil thing, in the Oklahoma oil fields. I went to Princeton University and I met the history department and I was going to do this whole thing about the 20th century and what industrialization meant."

Ultimately, Russell scrapped the idea because he thought it would be "arrogant" to try to make a judgment about the 20th century.

== 2000s ==
=== Benny Hernandez ===
In 2000, Russell intended to direct a documentary on the boxer/actor Benny Hernandez. At the time, Jeff Baena was hired to be an assistant editor for the online documentary, before contributing some writing ideas. "[Russell] was still shooting it as we were [editing]," recalled Baena. "Nothing ended up happening because it was right before the dot-com bust, and it was for this website that I think went under like almost immediately."

=== Dr. Zinkin Goes for It ===
In the early 2000s, while Jeff Baena was hospitalized, Russell kept him company and would discuss film ideas with him; the first of their collaborations being Dr. Zinkin Goes for It, a project at New Line loosely adapted from Henry's List of Wrongs. According to Baena, he and Russell retooled the original premise—a "sappy" melodrama about a ruthless banker who seeks to make amends with people he wronged—into a black comedy about a "dickhead dermatologist" who falls in love with a yoga teacher and then joins a variation of the Landmark Forum just to be with her. By August 2004, it was reported that an adaptation of Henry's List of Wrongs would be directed by Mark Waters, with Russell listed as one of several writers who had worked on it, alongside Harley Peyton, John Scott Shepherd, Scott Alexander and Larry Karaszewski.

=== Untitled Jeff Baena collaboration ===
According to Jeff Baena, he and Russell co-wrote a fourth script together in the 2000s, which ultimately went unproduced. It is not known if Russell had intended on directing the project as well. Russell and Baena would go on to collaborate on the script for I Heart Huckabees, as well as a rewrite of Meet the Fockers.

=== Temple Grandin ===
In 2002, Russell was attached to direct the Temple Grandin biopic for HBO, but was later replaced by Mick Jackson.

=== Untitled metaphysical sci-fi film ===
Following the release of I Heart Huckabees in 2004, Russell and Columbia professor Robert Thurman were said to be collaborating on a new screenplay, described as a "metaphysical movie with some science fiction in it." "It's going to involve the 'rebirth reality'—the Bardo—of people dying and being reborn and being re-recognized in the next life," said Thurman; likening the project to the 1989 reincarnation romantic comedy Chances Are. He added, "It's going to be a suspenseful plot with humor [...] midway between the comedic and the Three Kings type of deal". Thurman later "sold" a script idea to Russell: an action film called Psychonauts, spanning the multiple lives of a single hero, which may or may not be unrelated to this project.

=== The H Man Cometh ===
In 2006, Russell was in pre-production with Vince Vaughn on a film titled The H-Man Cometh, about sarcastic radio call-in show host Hume Stevens who takes on the qualities of his neurotic patrons. Elizabeth Banks was also attached to the project, later saying that, "Yeah, there was a David O. Russell movie that I really wanted to make with Vince Vaughn that ended up falling apart. I mean, I don’t get depressed, it’s just the nature of the game." Russell rewrote the screenplay, based on a draft done by David Cohen and Tony Lord.

=== Members Only ===
On January 22, 2014, ABC had given a straight-to-series 13-episode order to a drama series from Russell and Susannah Grant. The script for the pilot episode was written by Grant. Sarah Timberman and Carl Beverly also signed on as executive producers of show. First pitched as an FX series from Russell and writer Josh Lieb in 2006, the show was described as an upstairs-downstairs soap opera set at a private country club. On February 26, 2014, Russell departed the series as executive producer, saying "I'm not really transitioning right now to TV projects." Members Only, originally titled The Club, was canceled by ABC before its premiere.

=== The Grackle ===
In November 2008, Russell was in talks with New Line Cinema to direct Mike Arnold and Chris Poole's raucous comedy script of The Grackle. Matthew McConaughey was attached to star as a New Orleans barroom fighter who hires himself out for $250 to settle disputes for people who can't afford to hire a lawyer.

=== Aaron and Sarah ===
In April 2009, Russell signed with Fox 2000 to helm Aaron and Sarah, retitled from B.F.F., a romantic comedy described as John Hughes-esque. The film would have focused on a geek and a popular girl who meet as Freshman and fall in love over their four years together at high school. Chad Gomez Creasey and Dara Resnik Creasey wrote the screenplay.

=== Pride and Prejudice and Zombies ===
In December 2009, it was reported that Russell would write and direct an adaptation of Seth Grahame-Smith's horror-comedy-parody Pride and Prejudice and Zombies. In October 2010, Vulture.com reported that Russell had dropped out of directing because star/producer Natalie Portman couldn't meet his intended start date, though he himself later stated that he left due to an unsatisfactory budget. A separate film adaptation was later released in 2016, but Russell had no involvement.

== 2010s ==
=== Uncharted: Drake's Fortune ===
As early as May 2010, Russell had begun negotiating for the director's position on Uncharted: Drake's Fortune, a film adaptation based on the popular video game franchise. In November, an interview with Mark Wahlberg was published by MTV with the actor stating that he was excited for what Russell had in store. "I'm obviously in whatever David wants to do but the idea of it is so off the charts: Robert De Niro being my father, Joe Pesci being my uncle. It's not going to be the watered-down version, that's for sure." The following month, Russell told the Los Angeles Times that he was halfway finished with the script, which expanded the narrative to include Drake's extended family and put them in fraught situations: "This idea really turns me on that there's a family that's a force to be reckoned with in the world of international art and antiquities... that deals with heads of state and heads of museums and metes out justice." During a February 2011 interview, Russell further embellished about how he would approach the material. By May that year, it was reported that Russell had departed the film to direct Silver Linings Playbook.

=== Old St. Louis ===
In July 2010, it was reported that Russell had scripted a film titled Old St. Louis about a travelling salesman whose life changes when his daughter becomes part of his life. Vince Vaughn was in talks to produce and star in the film. Chloë Grace Moretz was set to play the daughter, with Scarlett Johansson appearing as the love interest. Speaking to The Playlist in 2012, Russell said "My Dad was a salesman and [Vaughn's] Dad was a salesman and it was really based on his Dad's experiences as a salesman and it's a great story. We're still talking about it," adding that "I wanted to make that happen, but [Vaughn's] own schedule kept us not being able to do it and so then that's what happened with that. You know there's always a specific reason for every story."

=== Under Cover ===
In September 2010, it was announced that Summit Entertainment was considering Russell to direct Jim Carrey in Under Cover, a comedy about a family man who joins a cover band.

=== Untitled cop franchise ===
In November 2010, it was reported that Ice Cube and Russell were in talks with New Line Cinema to create a potential yet-titled cop drama said to be in the vein of films like Dirty Harry and Death Wish.

=== 2 Guns ===
In January 2011, Russell was in talks to rewrite and direct Blake Masters' adaptation of 2 Guns with Vince Vaughn attached to star. A film was released in 2013, but without the involvement of Russell or Vaughn.

=== Cocaine Cowboys ===
On February 22, 2011, Russell revealed that to The Playlist that, in addition to simultaneously working on Uncharted: Drake's Fortune, Silver Linings Playbook and 2 Guns, he was considering directing a narrative film of the 2006 documentary Cocaine Cowboys, with Mark Wahlberg involved.

=== Joe ===
On February 27, 2011,

=== Untitled Russ Meyer biopic ===
On March 17, 2011, Deadline reported that Russell was in negotiations with Fox Searchlight to direct a feature biopic of the Sexploitation film director Russ Meyer.

=== Maleficent ===
In June 2011, as claimed by The Hollywood Reporter, Russell was one of the directors interested in taking over for Tim Burton on the production of Disney's Maleficent after his departure.

=== The Mission ===
That same month, Russell spoke of a project he was working on with producer Lorenzo di Bonaventura called Mission. "It's very cool," Russell told THR, "It's sort of an action-drama." The film was set up the following month at Warner Bros. as a starring vehicle for Brad Pitt.

=== Untitled Buddy Cianci biopic ===
It was officially confirmed by the Los Angeles Times in April 2012 that Russell would be directing a biopic of former Providence mayor Buddy Cianci after an arrangement with producer Jane Rosenthal. Based Cianci's biography Politics and Pasta, Russell was confirmed to not be writing the script for the film.

=== Untitled legal drama series ===
In August 2012, Russell was in negotiations with CBS to direct a legal drama written by Danny Strong inspired by a real-life New York father/daughter defense attorney team.

=== American Sniper ===
In September 2012, Russell revealed to The Hollywood Reporter that he was in talks with Bradley Cooper to direct American Sniper.

=== The Bends ===
Russell also mentioned a project he scripted titled The Bends, which would have been "a kind of cousin to Vertigo."

=== The Ends of the Earth ===
In February 2013, it was announced that Russell would be reunited with Jennifer Lawrence for The Ends of the Earth, a fact-based love story about a powerful oil tycoon who has everything stripped from him after he is caught in an affair. The script was written by Chris Terrio and was set to be produced by Todd Black, Steve Tisch and Jason Blumenthal of Escape Artists.

=== Legacy of Secrecy ===
In May 2013, Russell agreed to write and direct an adaptation of the JFK conspiracy thriller Legacy of Secrecy, based on the book by Lamar Waldron and Thom Hartmann. Leonardo DiCaprio was set to star as FBI informant Jack Van Lavinham and Robert De Niro was also attached to play mafia boss Carlos Marcello.

=== Untitled genre scripts ===
During a 2013 directors roundtable discussion for THR, Russell revealed he had written a horror film script that Eli Roth was interested in directing as well as a supernatural time travel script.

=== Jennifer Lawrence projects ===
During a 2015 directors roundtable discussion for THR, Russell revealed that prior to their collaboration on Joy, he had written "about 600 pages" of an epic 2-part family opus for Jennifer Lawrence, which he still hoped to make with the actress.

Later that month, Lawrence teased a new film that Russell was developing in which she would play the mother of Robert De Niro's character.

Speaking on a 2018 episode of WTF With Marc Maron, Lawrence announced she would star in a new project by Russell to film in the fall of that year.

In 2019, at a Tribeca retrospective of their work together, Russell told Lawrence "I'm writing something for you now." No further details were disclosed.

=== Untitled publishing documentary ===
In the same THR discussion, Russell also revealed that he was then working on a documentary about the world of novel publishing, inspired from how his parents met from working at Simon & Schuster.

=== Untitled Mafia drama series ===
In August 2016, The Hollywood Reporter confirmed that Russell was prepping a limited series set to star Robert De Niro and Julianne Moore. Later, in November, Amazon acquired the property, granting a two-season order — eight episodes each — for the mafia drama, with each installment to have been written and directed by Russell. In June 2017, Michael Shannon was cast to star alongside De Niro and Moore. That October, Amazon scrapped the series due to its involvement with The Weinstein Company.

=== Father Stu ===
In September 2016, Mark Wahlberg revealed that he and Russell were both at work on a screenplay about athlete-turned-priest Father Stuart Long. Revealed to be titled Father Stu, Russell would later leave the project as director, with newcomer Rosalind Ross boarding to write and direct for Wahlberg.

== 2020s ==
=== Untitled John D. Rockefeller biopic ===
In 2020, there was talk of Russell pursuing a biopic written by Charles Randolph of the oil business magnate John D. Rockefeller with oft-collaborator Robert De Niro portraying Rockefeller.

=== FIFA pilot episode ===
In 2022, O. Russell was set to direct the pilot for a Paramount+ limited series titled FIFA, set in the world of pro-soccer. Paramount also had a first-op deal with Russell to direct two other projects in addition to FIFA.

=== Super Toys ===
In 2023, Keke Palmer and Sacha Baron Cohen were announced to star in Russell's Super Toys, an original screenplay. The film is a period piece set in the 1970s that follows two toy sales representatives who find themselves "on a life-and-death mission to save themselves, their marriage and their live-wire 12-year-old daughter while on the road in Middle America." It was being pitched at the European Film Market in February that year, with FilmNation Entertainment handling international sales.

=== Untitled Linda Ronstadt biopic ===
In January 2024, it was announced that Selena Gomez would portray the role of Linda Ronstadt in an untitled biopic to be directed by Russell, based on the memoir Simple Dreams. While promoting Madden in November 2026, Russell updated that he was awaiting word from the producers on further developments.

=== Get Smart reboot ===
In April 2024, Warner Bros. was reported to be rebooting Get Smart, with Russell in talks to direct, and John Mulaney interested in starring as Maxwell Smart. In September 2026, it was confirmed that Mulaney was indeed eyeing the role.

=== Cash TV series ===
In November 2024, Jeff Sneider reported that Charlize Theron would team with Russell for the Paramount+ series Cash, about "Russian oligarchs and the British government."

=== Bananas TV series ===
In December 2024, Deadline Hollywood announced a new drama series in development at Apple TV+ called Bananas, with Russell directing and executive producing, and set to star Oscar Isaac and Ana de Armas. The project was written by Carolina Paiz.

=== Shutout ===
In 2025, Russell was set to direct and produce Shutout, a film set in the world of pool hustling based on a screenplay by Alejandro Adams. Robert De Niro was attached to star as Jake Kejeune, an old pool hustler who encounters a young prodigy, Mia (to be played by Jenna Ortega), and takes her under his wing. The project was to be pitched by Black Bear Pictures to international buyers at that year's Cannes Film Festival.

== Producer only ==
=== All About Me ===
In 2006, it was reported that Russell would produce the teen comedy All About Me, from a script by first-time screenwriter Jenna Lamia about a high school student who attempts fame through her facility's drama department. No cast or director was attached.

=== The Witness ===
In 2017, Russell signed on as producer for a narrative feature adaptation of the Kitty Genovese doc The Witness.

=== Boy21 ===
Also in 2017, Russell signed on as producer for an adaptation of the basketball drama Boy21.

=== Not Fade Away ===
In 2019, Deadline reported Russell's attachment as producer of a film adaptation of Not Fade Away, a 2015 memoir adapted by Lindsey Ferrentino. Emily Blunt was in talks to star.

=== Sonny Lovejoy ===
In 2025, Russell was attached as producer of Sonny Lovejoy, which had Gaby Hoffmann, Margo Martindale, Colleen Camp, Brooklynn Prince and Veronica Ferres all attached to star.
