= Oh, Hi! =

2025 American film by Sophie Brooks

- Theatrical release poster
- Directed by: Sophie Brooks
- Screenplay by: Sophie Brooks
- Story by: Sophie Brooks; Molly Gordon
- Produced by: David Brooks; Dan Clifton; Julie Waters; Sophie Brooks; Molly Gordon
- Starring: Molly Gordon; Logan Lerman; Geraldine Viswanathan; John Reynolds
- Cinematography: Conor Murphy
- Edited by: Kayla M. Emter
- Music by: Steven Price
- Production companies: Cliffbrook Films; Watermark Media; QWGmire
- Distributed by: Sony Pictures Classics
- Release dates: January 26, 2025 (Sundance); July 25, 2025 (United States)
- Running time: 95 minutes
- Country: United States
- Language: English
- Box office: $2.1 million

Oh, Hi! is a 2025 American romantic comedy film directed by Sophie Brooks and co-written with Molly Gordon. The film stars Gordon, Logan Lerman, Geraldine Viswanathan, and John Reynolds. The plot centers on the new couple Iris and Isaac, who go on a weekend vacation, only for her to take him hostage when she realizes that he is not as committed to their relationship as she is.

The film had its world premiere at the Sundance Film Festival on January 26, 2025, and was given a limited theatrical release in the United States on July 25, 2025, by Sony Pictures Classics.

== Plot ==
Iris and Isaac have been dating for four months and embark on their first romantic weekend getaway together to a rented farmhouse in High Falls, New York. On the first night, they have sex using bondage gear they discovered earlier in a locked closet, with Iris cuffing Isaac's wrists and ankles to the bed. Afterward, while still cuffed to the bed, Isaac confesses that he is not looking for a relationship at the moment and has been sleeping with other women, which shocks Iris, who presumed that they were in an exclusive relationship.

Angry and hurt, Iris leaves Isaac cuffed and spends the night listening to an online relationship expert. The next morning, she decides to keep him chained to the bed for the next 12 hours in an attempt to convince him that they belong together. However, after Iris spends the day trying to connect with Isaac, he angrily demands to be uncuffed and accuses her of kidnapping him. In despair, she calls her best friend Max for help. She arrives with her boyfriend Kenny, who warns Iris that he and Max have become accomplices in the kidnapping.

After Max obtains a spell from her cousin, who is a witch, she and Iris brew a potion to erase Isaac's memory of the recent events. While Kenny has Isaac drink the potion, Iris and Max strip naked and perform a ritual in front of a fire outside the farmhouse to ensure that the potion works. That night, Isaac dreams that he is on a date with Iris at a bar, where he consoles her after a bad day and they kiss. Later in the dream, he steps outside the farmhouse to find Iris singing "Islands in the Stream" to him; after they dance together and kiss, she tells him that she hates him.

Iris uncuffs Isaac in the morning, believing that he has no memory of the last two days. Heading down to the kitchen with the others, Isaac suggests making pancakes and claims that the flour is in Iris' car. After Iris gives him the keys, he drives away in her car in the pouring rain, having overheard Iris and Max's plan to erase his memory the night before. Max and Kenny attempt to convince Iris to pursue Isaac, but she says she is ready to take responsibility for her actions and goes back to bed.

Iris later receives a call from the local police, saying that her car has been found crashed against a tree with nobody inside. She frantically heads into the woods to search for Isaac, eventually finding him injured and unable to walk. The two have an honest conversation, in which Iris apologizes for trying to force him into a relationship, and he apologizes for not being able to give her the relationship she wants and for not being honest from the start. Iris watches as Isaac is taken away in an ambulance.

== Cast ==
- Molly Gordon as Iris
- Logan Lerman as Isaac
- Geraldine Viswanathan as Max, Iris' best friend
- John Reynolds as Kenny, Max's boyfriend
- David Cross as Steve, Iris and Isaac's neighbor
- Polly Draper as Iris' mother

== Production ==
After her first feature The Boy Downstairs (2017), screenwriter Sophie Brooks initially planned to produce a second feature the following year, but it took her four and a half years to develop the screenplay. In March 2020, her agent asked her to write something that could be filmed during the COVID-19 pandemic, and she collaborated on the screenplay with Molly Gordon, a friend of six years who was also stuck in Los Angeles with her during the pandemic. The two came up with the story idea that eventually became Oh, Hi! over a weekend, and Brooks completed the screenplay in two and a half weeks. Gordon, credited as a producer and co-writer, along with Brooks's brother and film producer David Brooks, helped refine the screenplay. Brooks wrote the screenplay with Gordon and John Reynolds in mind. In August 2024, the film was announced to be in production, featuring Gordon, Reynolds, Logan Lerman, and Geraldine Viswanathan in lead roles.

Principal photography was initially scheduled to begin in 2021, but was postponed to August 2024 in Germantown, New York. Filming continued through September, spanning for 21 days and wrapping up on September 13. The film's score was composed by Steven Price.

== Release ==
Oh, Hi! had its world premiere at the Sundance Film Festival on January 26, 2025. In March, Sony Pictures Classics acquired distribution rights. The film was given a limited theatrical release in the United States on July 25, 2025. The film began streaming on Netflix on November 22, 2025.

== Reception ==
On the review aggregator website Rotten Tomatoes, 64% of 133 critics' reviews are positive, with an average rating of 6.1/10. The website's consensus reads: "Oh, Hi!'s tonal balance can be as dysfunctional as its characters' relationship, but this darkly comedic battle of the sexes mostly amuses thanks in part to Molly Gordon and Logan Lerman's compatibility as co-stars." Metacritic, which uses a weighted average, assigned the film a score of 62 out of 100, based on 26 critics, indicating "generally favorable" reviews.

Drew Taylor of TheWrap described Oh, Hi as an "endlessly charming romantic comedy" that cleverly subverts the "cliches of a cabin-in-the-woods indie", featuring standout performances from Molly Gordon and Logan Lerman while balancing humor with genuine emotional depth in a way that feels both "refreshing" and "invigorating" with a "wholly unforgettable" final shot. Ross Bonaime of Collider gave the film a score of 7 out of 10, describing it as a "clever mixture of love and misery" that skillfully balances humor and absurdity, with Gordon's "fantastic" performance making it "consistently entertaining and unexpected" despite the plot's illogical direction.

Tomris Laffly of Variety found Oh, Hi! to have an "intriguing setup" that begins strongly with humor and chemistry between Molly Gordon and Logan Lerman, but ultimately loses its way as the plot becomes "frustrating" and characters make "incomprehensible decisions", resulting in a disappointing experience that remains "oddly watchable", largely due to the "talented cast", especially Gordon's performance. Benjamin Lee of The Guardian gave the film two out of five stars stars, noting that while it has a "clever setup" that initially explores the complexities of a romantic relationship, it ultimately devolves into an exaggerated farce, losing its emotional depth and character nuance, especially for Gordon's character, rendering it "goofy and hard to buy".

Jourdain Searles of The Hollywood Reporter considered the film as a refreshing take on the rom-com genre, also praising its dark humor and emotional depth through the chemistry between Molly Gordon and Logan Lerman, while noting its loss of narrative focus midway but ultimately delivering a "surprising commentary" on millennial romantic anxieties through its "playful writing and game cast". Robert Daniels of RogerEbert.com provided a negative review, noting that Gordon and Lerman have "no hint of a spark", which "significantly diminishes" the believability and intrigue of their relationship, while failing to explore anxieties and obsession in depth, ultimately rendering the film's attempts at humor and emotional depth ineffective.
