= Elizabeth Destro =

American film producer

- Born: United States
- Occupation: Film producer
- Known for: Life After Beth; The Butler; Clerks III

Elizabeth "Liz" Destro is an American film producer. She runs the production company Destro Films.

== Filmography ==
=== Producer ===
| Year | Title | Role | Notes |
|---|---|---|---|
| 2006 | Car Babes | Producer | |
| 2007 | Weapons | Associate producer | |
| 2007 | T.K.O. | Co-producer | |
| 2007 | The Living Wake | Co-producer | |
| 2008 | Explicit Ills | Producer | |
| 2012 | Here Comes the Night | Producer | |
| 2012 | The End of Love | Producer | |
| 2012 | About Cherry | Producer | |
| 2013 | The Butler | Executive producer | |
| 2014 | Trouble Dolls | Executive producer | |
| 2014 | Life of Crime | Producer | |
| 2014 | Life After Beth | Producer | |
| 2014 | Here Comes the Night | Producer | |
| 2015 | Cake | Co-producer | |
| 2015 | Midnight Sex Run | Producer | |
| 2016 | Yoga Hosers | Producer | |
| 2016 | Joshy | Producer | |
| 2017 | The Little Hours | Producer | |
| 2018 | Lizzie | Producer | |
| 2019 | Jay and Silent Bob Reboot | Producer | |
| 2022 | Clerks III | Producer | |
