= The End of Love =

- Directed by: Mark Webber
- Written by: Mark Webber
- Produced by: Mark Webber; Elizabeth Destro; Mollie Engelhart
- Starring: Mark Webber; Shannyn Sossamon; Jason Ritter; Frances Shaw; Amanda Seyfried
- Cinematography: Patrice Lucien Cochet
- Edited by: Sven Pape
- Music by: Pia Kayser
- Production companies: Poor Rich Kids; Here Now Productions; Variance Films
- Distributed by: Wrekin Hill Entertainment (theatrical release); Gravitas Ventures (VOD)
- Release dates: January 21, 2012 (Sundance); March 1, 2013 (United States)
- Running time: 89 minutes
- Country: United States
- Language: English
- Box office: $9,342

The End of Love is a drama film written and directed by Mark Webber. It stars Michael Cera, Amanda Seyfried and Mark Webber. It premiered at the 2012 Sundance Film Festival and was released theatrically in the United States on March 1, 2013.

== Plot ==
When the mother of his infant son unexpectedly dies, struggling actor Mark (Mark Webber) grapples with fatherhood and his inability to grow up. And when he sparks with a single mother, he learns how his choices have real-life consequences.

== Cast ==
- Mark Webber as Himself
- Shannyn Sossamon as Lydia
- Issac Love as Himself
- Jason Ritter as Himself
- Frankie Shaw as Evelyn
- Amanda Seyfried as Herself
- Michael Cera as Himself
- Jocelin Donahue as Herself
- Aubrey Plaza as Herself
- Michael Angarano as Himself
- Alia Shawkat as Herself
- Jeff Baena as Himself

== Reception ==
On review aggregator website Rotten Tomatoes, the film holds an approval rating of 59% based on 17 critic reviews, with an average rating of 6.71/10. According to Metacritic, which compiled 13 reviews and calculated a weighted average score of 56 out of 100, the film received "mixed or average reviews".
