= The Little Hours =

2017 film by Jeff Baena

- Theatrical release poster
- Directed by: Jeff Baena
- Written by: Jeff Baena
- Based on: The Decameron by Giovanni Boccaccio
- Produced by: Aubrey Plaza; Liz Destro
- Starring: Alison Brie; Dave Franco; Aubrey Plaza; Kate Micucci; John C. Reilly; Molly Shannon; Fred Armisen
- Cinematography: Quyen Tran
- Edited by: Ryan Brown
- Music by: Dan Romer
- Production companies: StarStream Media; Bow and Arrow Entertainment; Destro Films; Dublab Media; Productivity Media; Concourse Media; Exhibit Entertainment; Foton Pictures
- Distributed by: Gunpowder & Sky (United States); Universal Pictures (International)
- Release dates: January 19, 2017 (Sundance); June 30, 2017 (United States)
- Running time: 90 minutes
- Countries: United States; Canada
- Language: English
- Box office: $1.6 million

The Little Hours is a 2017 black comedy film written and directed by Jeff Baena and loosely based on stories from the third day of The Decameron, a 14th-century collection of novellas by Giovanni Boccaccio. It stars an ensemble cast featuring Alison Brie, Dave Franco, Aubrey Plaza, Kate Micucci, John C. Reilly, Molly Shannon, and Fred Armisen.

Set in the 14th century, The Little Hours uses modern dialogue – in the spirit of its source material – improvised by the actors based on Baena's detailed outline. It focuses on the sex lives of its characters, including nuns at a convent (Brie, Micucci, Plaza and Shannon) in rural Tuscany, a local coven of witches, and a young servant (Franco) who ends up pretending to be a deaf-mute gardener at the convent after running away from his master (Nick Offerman).

It premiered at the Sundance Film Festival on January 19, 2017, and was theatrically released by Gunpowder & Sky, the company's first such distribution, on June 30, 2017. Muted complaints from Catholic groups did not negatively affect the film's release; it received generally positive reviews from critics, featuring praise for the cast's performances.

== Plot ==
In 1347 Garfagnana, Sister Fernanda returns to her convent with their donkey after missing Lauds. She curses out the friendly groundskeeper Lurco; Sister Ginevra, who shows sycophantic devotion to Fernanda, joins in. Sister Alessandra gets to meet with her father Ilario, impatiently asking when he will take her out of the convent so she can marry. Ilario says this will not happen, as despite being wealthy he cannot afford a dowry for her. The three nuns encounter Lurco outside, who smiles at Fernanda. When she and Ginevra shout at him again, Alessandra – in a foul mood after Fernanda antagonized her about her conversation – joins in even more abusively. Lurco leaves the convent because of this, stopping Father Tommasso to tell him as Tommasso is leaving to sell embroidery.

In Lunigiana, Lord Bruno is lecturing to his bored wife Francesca about the evil of Guelphs. Francesca takes servant boy Massetto to bed; Bruno goes to check on her, seeing Massetto leave through the window. In the servants' quarters, Bruno identifies Massetto by his fast heartbeat and, in the dark, shears off some of his hair to mark him. Come morning, all the men are missing hair and Bruno lets them go. He talks about Guelphs again at breakfast, prompting Francesca to seek out Massetto in the grounds. Bruno sees their interaction from the castle walls and Massetto is driven out by his guards.

Tommasso becomes drunk on his journey and loses the embroidery in a river. Massetto, crossing the river at the same time, offers to help him fix his crashed cart, and returns to the convent with him. The men get drunk on sacramental wine and Massetto confesses to his adultery; Tommasso offers him shelter and work at the convent as a gardener on the condition he pretend to be deaf-mute, in the hopes that if the nuns cannot rile him up they will leave him alone. In the courtyard, Massetto smiles at Alessandra, who returns the gesture; though Fernanda initially abuses him too, when Mother Marea informs the nuns he is deaf-mute, she tones down her behavior. Alessandra is implored to embroider at a faster rate due to Tommasso's losses, and in frustration damages her frame. She takes it to Massetto to repair, confiding in him; the other nuns watch her leave.

Marta, "an especially wayward nun" from elsewhere who knows Fernanda, sneaks in. She guides the three nuns to have a party in Alessandra's quarters; though Ginevra is wary of Marta, Alessandra has become nihilistic and pressures Ginevra to get drunk on sacramental wine. Marta tells the pair about the pleasure of sex with a man, then, after Alessandra has fallen asleep, makes out with Fernanda. When Fernanda takes Ginevra back to their quarters, they have sex. Having enjoyed Massetto's company, Alessandra visits him in the garden, where they begin to have sex until getting interrupted. Ginevra tries to talk to Fernanda about their relationship, but Fernanda dismisses it and then leaves to go to Marta in the woods. Ginevra watches from a distance as Fernanda and Marta prepare a fertility ritual using belladonna, then ambush Massetto and have a threesome.

Bishop Bartolomeo surprises the convent to check their sales accounts. Massetto sneaks into Alessandra's quarters to have sex with her, also interrupted. Ginevra, unhappy with Fernanda, tells Marea that Fernanda has been lying and then sneaks out to the woods, incorrectly taking Fernanda's potion and falling under belladonna's psychoactive effects. Alessandra is trying to talk to Massetto when Ginevra goes to accost him, and both nuns end up hiding together when Fernanda arrives to kidnap Massetto and take him to the woods where Marta's witch coven are planning to complete the fertility ritual. The pair follow them, and a hallucinating Ginevra interrupts the coven, causing Massetto to reveal he can hear and speak as he tries to escape. The four return to the convent, awakening Bartolomeo as they try to accuse each other, who then discovers Tommasso and Marea are having an affair. Bartolomeo judges their sins with a penitential and sends Tommasso away.

Massetto is returned to Bruno, who describes how he plans to torture him. Alessandra wants to free him and enlists help from Fernanda and Ginevra, who have bonded over embracing their carnal desires. They distract the guards using turtles with candles and break Massetto out, returning to the convent in two couples. Tommasso and Marea meet by a bridge.

== Cast ==
- Alison Brie as Sister Alessandra
- Dave Franco as Massetto
- Kate Micucci as Sister Ginevra
- Aubrey Plaza as Sister Fernanda
- John C. Reilly as Father Tommasso
- Molly Shannon as Mother Marea
- Fred Armisen as Bishop Bartolomeo
- Jemima Kirke as Marta
- Nick Offerman as Lord Bruno
- Lauren Weedman as Francesca
- Paul Reiser as Ilario
- Adam Pally as Guard Paolo
- Paul Weitz as Lurco
- Jon Gabrus as Guard Gregorio

== Production ==
=== Development and writing ===
Jeff Baena came up with the idea for The Little Hours after having a discussion while high and watching DOGTV with a filmmaker friend, Joe Swanberg. In the conversation Baena explained his collegiate studies of sexual transgression in the Middle Ages and Giovanni Boccaccio's The Decameron, and his long-standing desire to make a "medieval combat nun movie", and Swanberg encouraged Baena to make a film with this concept. The next day, Baena called Liz Destro, who had produced his previous films, to pitch the idea; Destro had an investor who had long requested for a film to be made at locations they had in Lucca, Italy, which would be suitable for Baena's pitch, and Baena went to scout them within a few months.

While visiting potential locations, Baena did not explain that the film was an adaptation of The Decameron, due to the book remaining controversial in Catholic areas of Italy. He wrote a twenty-page film treatment rather than a screenplay, primarily based on the first two tales of the third day in The Decameron. Parts of the film surrounding Marea and Tommasso's affair were also based on the second tale of the ninth day. Baena felt that the stories were still humorous despite their age. In adapting the medieval work, he aimed to "achieve the spirit of the original story" through keeping its sense of humor and reflecting the social and political dynamics utilized by Boccaccio. Actresses Aubrey Plaza and Alison Brie were pleased with the character journeys for the three main nuns developed through the story, with Brie describing that "[Massetto] became a symbol for each of [the nuns] to discover something else within them."

I didn't set out to ... try to do Airplane! or any of that stuff ... I read the stories and there's a tone to the stories, which is silly and bawdy but also clever and fun, and there's a wittiness to them and a humanity 'cause ultimately Boccaccio was trying to get people to relate to people. [My] ultimate goal was just to make these people relatable, so that even though this is almost 700 years old we connect with them ... even though it's like we're laughing with them, or laughing at them, we have some kind of connection to them as human beings.

— Jeff Baena, Chicago Critics Film Festival 2017

Plaza, Baena's partner, was raised Catholic and attended Catholic school. She was involved in the development from an early stage, contributing to the research for specifics of convent practices, and Baena incorporated elements inspired by Plaza in his story. Baena also consulted religious scholars while researching. The film was originally jokingly called Nunz, before Plaza suggested changing it to refer to Little Hours (minor prayer hours), a term Plaza recalled after looking for the specific prayer the priest would recite in a certain scene. The film was Plaza's producing debut. She produced alongside Destro and Destro Films, with StarStream Media and Bow and Arrow Entertainment executive producing along with Productivity Media, and Exhibit Entertainment and Foton Pictures. Dan Romer composed the film's score.

=== Casting ===
The film's casting directors were Nicole Daniels and Courtney Bright. In April 2016, it was announced that the film would star Alison Brie, Dave Franco, Kate Micucci, Aubrey Plaza, John C. Reilly, Molly Shannon, Fred Armisen, Jon Gabrus, Jemima Kirke, Nick Offerman, Adam Pally, Paul Reiser, Lauren Weedman, and Paul Weitz. Many of these actors had previously worked with Baena; he had also asked Garry Marshall (who had been in Baena's directorial debut Life After Beth) to return for a role, but Marshall was too ill to travel and died a few months later. Local Italian people were cast in supporting roles.

Plaza, who helped to assemble the ensemble cast, was the first actor to join. Baena then approached their friend, Brie, to pitch her the film. Brie "unofficially signed on" and Baena told her he wanted Franco, Brie's partner, to play across from her in the film. Micucci and Reilly then joined the cast before Baena reached out to another friend and frequent collaborator in Shannon. Franco, hesitant to act in something so heavily improvised, was "slowly ... massag[ed]" into agreeing by Brie and joined after the main cast of women were attached. Kirke signed on after Baena came up with her character when they were "just hanging out [together]". Brie and Franco signed on to the film from Baena's pitch of a contemporary sex comedy about 14th century nuns, which they found original and exciting, while Micucci and Shannon liked the project as both had personal interests in playing nuns.

Shannon was also excited to join a cast of strong women, which she compared to Rosalind Russell films, and praised Plaza for her strong support of talented and funny women. Baena had been aware that his film Joshy, shot shortly before The Little Hours, "had a lot of masculine energy", and wanted to consciously feature more women.

=== Filming ===
Baena looked for a cinematographer through personal recommendations instead of agencies, and chose Quyen Tran, who had worked on the original short film of SMILF with mutual friend Frankie Shaw. Tran and Baena watched Robert Altman films as inspiration for the visual language of The Little Hours, being particularly influenced by 3 Women, and Tran also took inspiration from 14th century art. Many such paintings "have very wide, stacked shots with a lot of action happening in one frame", something Tran aimed to emulate for aesthetics and to capture as much of the actors' improvised performances as possible while shooting single-camera. Baena had learned a lot from directing Joshy, which was also improvised, and felt that the two films ended up being stylistically (though not tonally) similar. As an independent film, the camera crew for The Little Hours was very small, with Tran only able to take five people: a gaffer, a key grip, two camera assistants, and a swing person "who kind of did everything". There was no second unit, so Tran created all the B-roll for the editor, shooting establishing shots whenever she had time available around filming scenes.

The film was shot on an Arri Amira camera in 3.8 UHD with Cooke S4 lenses; Baena had wanted to shoot in 4K and so Tran had planned to use the Arri Alexa XT, but found this camera was not available after they had arrived in Italy and so chose the Amira as an "acceptable" substitute. The Amira is similar to an ENG camera, which Tran found to be of benefit in terms of the ease of using it handheld, as she had to operate all equipment by herself.

Photography lasted twenty days and took place in locations across the Tuscan province of Lucca, including Castiglione di Garfagnana, Castelnuovo di Garfagnana, Pieve Fosciana, and Camporgiano. The castle scenes were filmed at Malaspina Castle, in the Province of Massa-Carrara. Using fewer physical locations, (Note: Baena, speaking about general areas, said there were "six or seven". Tran, speaking about more specific set-ups, said there were nineteen.) and spending thirteen of their shoot days at the convent, made working in rural Tuscany more practical, as logistical challenges meant the production spent a lot of time moving each time they changed location. Scenes in the chapel were the first to be filmed, with the shoot beginning on March 28, 2016. The crew had been concerned about the weather, as the film is set in spring and March weather can be incredibly unpredictable in the area; Baena said they were lucky that "legitimately a day before we started shooting it just transferred over to spring".

Tran had been included on location from her arrival in Italy, and was able to work with Baena and the production designers. Still, she and her crew found the shoot "crazy", facing practical challenges particularly with lighting in the rural and historic locations. For exterior scenes, Tran planned lighting around the sun. Knowing she would be without some lighting tools or enough crew to operate them, Tran had taken detailed notes on the sun when visiting locations before the shoot. At a nighttime bonfire scene, firelight and PAR lights were used. For interior scenes, there was limited electricity available and Tran had to use candlelight, including making wicks herself, for night scenes. She also worked with production design to introduce background candles into daytime scenes. One reason for this was Tran's motivation to aim for realistic period lighting, and thus a lack of other backlighting (to separate actors from backgrounds) unless there were windows on the set. Another reason was to achieve a bokeh effect; Tran prefers using practical lighting for effects. After discussion with Baena she also used a Hollywood Black Magic filter to achieve glow effects in the film.

The sets were accurate to the medieval period, but the behavior and language of the characters are modern – reflecting how The Decameron was written in common language of its own period – and, though Baena's treatment planned scenes, the dialogue was improvised. Some of the actors were not used to improvisation, and in early takes "were more mannered like they're in a Game of Thrones episode", before settling into their characters and acting naturally. Without a script to go by, Tran took notes on her transitions as they were filmed.

== Release ==
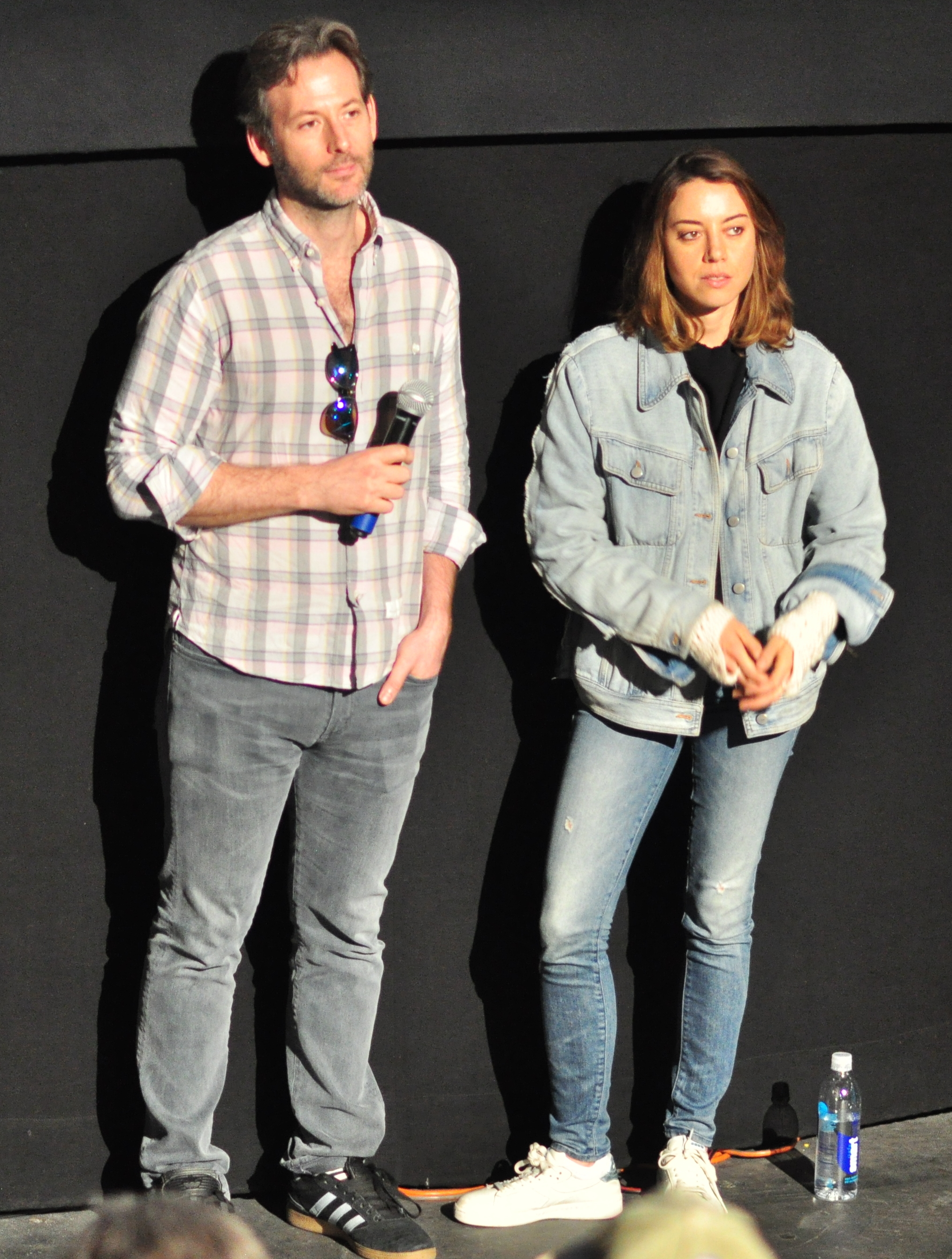
Baena and Plaza at the Seattle International Film Festival screening in May 2017

The film had its world premiere at the Sundance Film Festival on January 19, 2017, giving Baena the honor of having each of his first three features selected to Sundance. Shortly after, Gunpowder & Sky acquired distribution rights to the film in the United States and key international markets, for a fee in the "low seven figures". This deal was accepted because of its plans for a theatrical release, despite Plaza considering it a risk, as the majority of the offers to buy the film out of Sundance were for a simultaneous release, something Baena disliked. Gunpowder & Sky said they planned to take "some good creative risks in the distribution". As well as a red-band trailer that had over 16 million views, The Little Hours was promoted by Plaza preparing and smoking weed with the non-religious "weed nuns" of Sisters of the Valley.

The Little Hours was released on June 30, 2017, initially in two theaters with plans to reach "at least 50 markets": it ended up playing in 173 theaters at its widest release. It was Gunpowder & Sky's (originally a production company) widest film release at the time, and first theatrical release, made possible after they purchased indie film distribution company FilmBuff in September 2016. The film grossed a total of $1,647,175 from an 11-week theatrical run. It opened in two theaters on its opening weekend and took $56,676; it was one of few specialty releases to take more than $20,000 per theater, and achieved the highest per-theater average of all films that weekend. It was released to over 100 theaters in its third week.

It was released on home video on September 22, 2017, making approximately $250,000 in DVD and Blu-ray sales. It did well in transactional video on demand (VOD), where it stayed in the top 20 for two weeks, before it was released on Epix for the Christmas market. International deals were handled by Concourse Media. They promoted it at the 2016 Marché du Film, where Universal Pictures acquired international distribution rights. After working together on the film, Concourse Media and Productivity Media formed a partnership in July 2016 to create a film slate of up to a dozen pictures; The Little Hours retroactively became the first film in this sales and financing deal between the companies. In Universal Pictures UK and Universal Sony Nordic AB regions, it was released direct-to-DVD in 2018; initially slated for a limited release in Australia, it instead released as VOD on February 21, 2018. The film was R-rated in the United States, in the UK it was certified 15, and in Denmark it was rated 11.

== Reception ==
=== Critical reception ===
The Little Hours received positive reviews from film critics. It holds a 78% approval rating on review aggregator website Rotten Tomatoes, based on 128 reviews, with a weighted average of 6.5/10. The website's critical consensus reads: "The Little Hours gets plenty of goofy mileage out of its gifted ensemble, anchoring its ribald laughs in a period comedy with some surprisingly timely subtext." On Metacritic, the film holds a rating of 69 out of 100, based on 29 critics, indicating "generally favorable reviews". Reviews were impressed with how well the concept worked, and praised Baena's comedic direction as well as the cast.

For the Chicago Reader, J. R. Jones considered the cast strong and highlighted Plaza, saying that as "Sister Fernanda, she nearly walks away with [the film]" and her performance "powers a story in which the convent begins to feel like a prison of the soul". Mick LaSalle described the women as "terrific", also highlighting Plaza, and she was noted by Richard Roeper for "knock[ing] it out of the park as Sister Fernanda" and doing so in a way that drove the plot and set the tone. David Sims said Micucci was "easily the funniest part of the movie" and Reilly and Armisen stood out among the supporting players. Michael Phillips opined that "among a savvy cast, Weedman tops the roster" in her smaller role; Brian Tallerico for RogerEbert.com similarly noted the supporting cast, writing that "Nick Offerman and Fred Armisen practically steal the movie in just a few scenes." Claudia Puig said that Plaza, Reiser and particularly Offerman "have a talent for sardonic comedy [that] suits the bawdy material perfectly".

Praising the large and subtle comedic talents of all individual cast members, and Baena for knowing how to use them all together, Sheila O'Malley gave a 4 out of 4 star review for RogerEbert.com; she wrote that "what could have been—in less confident hands—a one-joke sketch becomes, instead, a consistently wacko screwball." LaSalle also lauded Baena's writing and directing, saying that he "combines a zany comic vision with a rare control of tone. [...] There's no winking or nudging, no straining for laughs." LaSalle was particularly impressed at how Baena used his cast's improvised dialogue while keeping the concept tight. Barbara VanDenburgh for The Arizona Republic instead felt that "a little more scripting [...] would have served it well." Variety's Peter Debruge was complimentary to Baena's ability in adapting The Decameron, noting that while not uncommon among European auteurs, none had successfully translated it "for the megaplex crowd" as Baena did.

Tallerico, Roeper, and The Hollywood Reporter's John Defore praised Baena for making the film, above all, funny and enjoyable; Bruce DeMara of the Toronto Star instead thought that even with the cast, the film's "comic sparks fail to ignite". In a mixed review, Ann Hornaday opined that the film's humor still managed to be "ribald and ingratiatingly goofy, even after it begins to wear tiresomely thin". The Globe and Mail's Barry Hertz felt the film was weaker in the last half hour and VanDenburgh said that it was less funny as it went along, while Peter Keough in The Boston Globe thought it improved after the start and Sims wrote that it "kick[ed] into an enjoyably high gear for its third act, as all of the sexual shenanigans and black magic build to some hilarious carnage".

Slant Magazine's Chuck Bowen wrote that the film's cast-led comedy built to "a poignant ending [in which] the convent's citizens shed [conservative] pretenses and begin their search for a new way". Puig said the film's comedy was a lens to explore how repressed women cope, and April Wolfe for The Village Voice wrote that the film "follows up its punchlines with philosophical discussions untangling why people behave so absurdly", describing the unfolding relationships between characters as "actually sweet to watch". Hertz, Roeper and Sims instead thought the premise was an obvious or simple comedic "nuns gone wild" that the cast managed to make work.

Tran's cinematography was praised by Phillips, for its attractiveness as well as for the "dreamy slow zooms [which] recall an average Italian soft-core romp of the '70s", because such "sensual longing" is integral to the material. Debruge likewise wrote that "Tran elevates the joke with her splendid widescreen compositions." Both were also positive about Romer's score for the humorous way it used choral arrangements. In her thesis for City University of New York, Kim Baglieri wrote that the film "employ[ed] the pacing of sound and music to build toward a shock".

=== Complaints from Catholic groups ===
Prior to its theatrical release, various Catholic groups protested the film's distribution: America Needs Fatima started an online petition in June 2017 that gained 31,000 signatories, sending a letter to Gunpowder & Sky to complain about the film for "wrongly" representing priests and nuns being immoral; a campaign of the American Society for the Defense of Tradition, Family and Property had an online petition gain 20,000 signatures and requested Gunpowder & Sky cancel the release of the film; and the Catholic League wrote a disparaging article about Sundance for premiering both The Little Hours and Novitiate. None had seen the film. IndieWire noted in its coverage of the complaints that the content was present in the 14th century source material, and that The Little Hours "embraces its own silliness so wholeheartedly that it's hard to view the film as any kind of attack on Catholicism or religion."

Baena responded to the complaints by saying that many nuns of the Middle Ages were not pious, but instead effectively trapped in convents. He reflected that they had the same emotional complexity and desires as modern people, and that "the whole point of the church" is to recognize human flaws. He felt that the independent nature of the film meant the complaints would not create a controversy affecting its release, and Gunpowder & Sky added a line from the Catholic League's article calling The Little Hours "trash, pure trash" to their marketing materials.

=== Accolades ===
The Little Hours received some nominations, and Time included it as an honorable mention in its Top 10 Movies of 2017 list. An alternative film poster, which featured the cast's faces "artificially pasted ... painfully bad[ly] on purpose" over an artwork of Clare of Assisi, was nominated for Best Comedy Movie Poster at the IMP Awards in 2017.

Organization	Date of ceremony	Category	Recipient(s)	Result	Ref.
American Cinematographer	February 10, 2017	10 Rising Stars of Cinematography	Quyen Tran (Note: Also for Deidra & Laney Rob a Train)	Included	
Chlotrudis Society for Independent Films	2018	Best Adapted Screenplay	Jeff Baena	Nominated	
Chlotrudis Society for Independent Films	2018	Best Performance by an Ensemble Cast	Alison Brie, Aubrey Plaza, Dave Franco, Fred Armisen, Jemima Kirke, John C. Reilly, Kate Micucci, Molly Shannon, Nick Offerman	Nominated	
Edinburgh International Film Festival	July 2, 2017	Audience Award	The Little Hours	Nominated	
Golden Trailer Awards	May 31, 2018	Trashiest Trailer	The Little Hours; Gunpowder & Sky, Jump Cut Creative	Won	
Golden Trailer Awards	May 31, 2018	Best Independent Poster	The Little Hours; Gunpowder & Sky, Jump Cut Creative	Nominated	
Neuchâtel International Fantastic Film Festival	July 8, 2017	H. R. Giger Award "Narcisse" for Best Feature Film	The Little Hours; Jeff Baena	Nominated	
