= Jake Picking =

American actor

- Born: 1990 or 1991 (age 35–36); Erlangen, Germany
- Occupation: Actor
- Years active: 2013–present

Jake Picking (born 1990 or 1991) is an American actor. He is best known for portraying Rock Hudson in the Netflix series Hollywood (2020), created by Ryan Murphy. He is also known for playing the role of Sean Collier in Patriots Day (2016), and appearing in Top Gun: Maverick (2022). In 2022, he starred as young Gerald Ford in the Showtime series The First Lady.

== Biography ==
Jake Picking was born in Erlangen, Germany, where his father, a United States Army soldier and West Point graduate, was stationed. He grew up in Wellesley, Massachusetts. At New York University, Picking was a winger on the New York ice hockey team. He dropped out of business school after a year because he was more interested in acting and student film projects. As an ice hockey player, Picking appeared in an NHL commercial before his acting career.

Picking's high school math teacher encouraged him to try out acting, and he took lessons with Carolyn Pickman, a casting agent who also represented Ben Affleck and Matt Damon.

Picking finally began attending auditions in Boston, in 2013 he made his feature film debut with a role in the youth film The Way, Way Back with Steve Carell. This was followed by guest appearances in the series Ironside (2013) and Chasing Life (2014). To start a professional acting career, he moved to Los Angeles, where he initially studied old Hollywood films with stars such as James Dean, Paul Newman, Marlon Brando or Montgomery Clift in his one-room apartment out of loneliness. He preferred moving to the West Coast to a possible acting course at the NYU Tisch School of the Arts, although he had no contacts whatsoever in Los Angeles.

In the next years Picking was regularly in movie productions but mostly subscribed to support roles. In 2016, he was part of the ensemble of the drama Goat, which deals with physical and psychological violence in the American college fraternity landscape. In the role of the sadistic oath master Dixon, Picking tormented Brett, played by Nick Jonas. In the same year he appeared in the thriller Patriots Day, which dramatizes the attack on the Boston Marathon. Here he played the part of policeman Sean Collier, who is shot by the bombers Dzhokhar and Tamerlan Tsarnaev (played by Alex Wolff and Themo Melikidze).

In 2022, Picking appeared in the Top Gun sequel Top Gun: Maverick as Lt. Brigham "Harvard" Lennox.

== Filmography ==
=== Film ===
Key
| † | Denotes works that have not yet been released |

| Year | Title | Role | Notes |
|---|---|---|---|
| 2013 | The Way, Way Back | Chad | |
| 2016 | Dirty Grandpa | Cody | |
| 2016 | Goat | Dixon Rowley | |
| 2016 | Patriots Day | Sean Collier | |
| 2017 | Only the Brave | Anthony Rose | |
| 2018 | Blockers | Kyler | |
| 2018 | Sicario: Day of the Soldado | Shawn | |
| 2020 | Horse Girl | Brian | |
| 2022 | Spin Me Round | Jake | |
| 2022 | Top Gun: Maverick | Lieutenant Brigham "Harvard" Lennox | |
| 2022 | The Greatest Beer Run Ever | Rick Duggan | |

=== Television ===
| Year | Title | Role | Notes |
|---|---|---|---|
| 2013 | Ironside | Nate | Episode: "Pilot" |
| 2014 | Salvation | Noah Thompson | TV movie |
| 2014 | Chasing Life | Sean | 2 episodes |
| 2018 | Angie Tribeca | Emerson Lake-Palmer | Episode: "Behind the Scandalabra" |
| 2020 | Hollywood | Rock Hudson | Main role |
| 2022 | The First Lady | Gerald Ford (young) | 2 episodes |
| 2026 | Running Point | Tommy White | Recurring |
