= Horse Girl =

2020 film by Jeff Baena

- Release poster
- Directed by: Jeff Baena
- Written by: Jeff Baena; Alison Brie
- Produced by: Mel Eslyn; Alana Carithers; Jeff Baena; Alison Brie
- Starring: Alison Brie; Debby Ryan; John Reynolds; Molly Shannon; John Ortiz; Paul Reiser; Matthew Gray Gubler
- Cinematography: Sean McElwee
- Edited by: Ryan Brown
- Music by: Josiah Steinbrick; Jeremy Zuckerman
- Production company: Duplass Brothers Productions
- Distributed by: Netflix
- Release dates: January 27, 2020 (Sundance); February 7, 2020 (United States)
- Running time: 103 minutes
- Country: United States
- Language: English

Horse Girl is a 2020 American psychological drama film directed and produced by Jeff Baena, from a screenplay written by Baena and Alison Brie. It stars Brie, Debby Ryan, John Reynolds, Molly Shannon, John Ortiz, and Paul Reiser.

The film had its world premiere at the Sundance Film Festival on January 27, 2020. It was released on Netflix on February 7, 2020.

== Plot ==
Sarah is an introverted young woman whose mother died by suicide. After finding Sarah home alone on her birthday, Sarah's roommate Nikki invites her boyfriend Brian and his roommate, Darren, over for a double date. The four smoke marijuana and have drinks. The date is interrupted by Sarah's nose bleeding. After Darren leaves, Sarah has a dream in which she lies face up in a white room. A man and woman also lie down near her, unaware of their surroundings.

The following morning, Nikki awakens to find Sarah sleeping on the living room floor and large scratch marks running across the wall. Darren returns to the apartment to retrieve his car and asks Sarah on a date. At work, she has another nose bleed. While recovering, she recognizes Ron, a man walking outside who resembles the one from her dream. Later, Sarah spends an afternoon with her childhood friend Heather who suffered a traumatic brain injury in a riding accident. Heather has recurrent seizures and short-term memory loss.

While driving home, Sarah stops at a red light near a water facility. She then finds herself in her kitchen with the tap running, unable to account for the elapsed time. She later hears a woman talking indistinctly in another room when no one is home. She then finds that her car has been stolen from her garage.

Gary, Sarah's wealthy stepfather, learns that the car has appeared at a tow yard, as the registration is still in his name. He brings her to retrieve it, and the tow driver reveals that the car was abandoned near a water facility in the middle of the road.

Later, Sarah apparently sleepwalks out of her apartment and awakens standing outside by a telephone booth. At her apartment, she discovers that somehow only some minutes had passed. At work, her boss Joan suggests that she visit a doctor given her familial history of mental health problems.

Sarah becomes convinced that she is experiencing alien abductions. Due to her striking resemblance to her deceased grandmother, Sarah fears that she may be her clone. Meanwhile, she tracks Ron to a plumbing store that he owns. While on a date with Darren, Sarah manically confides her belief that she is a clone and has him drive her to her mother's grave to dig her up and retrieve her DNA. Sarah eventually accuses a disturbed Darren of plotting against her, and threatens him with scissors, forcing him to leave her there.

Sarah takes a shower at home, but soon finds herself walking through the back door to her work, standing naked in the store. Joan helps her and calls the police, after which Sarah is admitted to a psychiatric hospital. She awakens in the middle of the night to find the door to her room unlocked. Escaping from the hospital, she visits various places. At the crafts store she works at, Sarah steals fabric and crafts protective suits for herself and Willow, her childhood horse. However, she is confronted by the owner of Willow's stable when she goes to deliver the horse's suit. Fleeing, she visits a sympathetic Darren, and the two begin to have sex, after which he disappears.

She creates a doorway out of fabric and enters through it into the white room. There, she sees shadowy figures tending to unconscious people, including herself and the two other people from her dreams. She exits through a window into Heather's bedroom and joins her in bed, but awakens the next morning to find herself back in the hospital, implying that everything since her escape was part of a dream. She recognizes another patient in her room as the woman from her dream; when Sarah describes it, the woman reveals that they share elements in their dreams, such as an alien ramp in the middle of the ocean. Sarah takes this as confirmation of her belief that they are both alien abductees and joyfully tells her social worker that she is not delusional. Despite the social worker's reservations, Sarah is discharged after 72 hours.

At home, Sarah dresses in her grandmother's dress. She steals Willow from the stable and walks with her into the woods. In a clearing, Sarah stops and lies on the ground. A spaceship then appears; she levitates toward the sky and disappears.

== Cast ==
- Alison Brie as Sarah
  - Victoria Claire as young Sarah
- Debby Ryan as Nikki, Sarah's roommate
- John Reynolds as Darren, Sarah's love-interest
- Molly Shannon as Joan, Sarah's coworker
- John Ortiz as Ron, an owner of a plumbing company
- Jay Duplass as Ethan, a social worker
- Robin Tunney as Agatha Kaine, a character in Purgatory
- Paul Reiser as Gary, Sarah's stepdad
- Matthew Gray Gubler as Darren Colt, a character in Purgatory
- Meredith Hagner as Heather, Sarah's disabled friend
  - Zoe Saltz as Young Heather
- Jake Picking as Brian, Nikki's boyfriend
- Dylan Gelula as Jane Doe
- Toby Huss as Joe, a horse trainer
- Angela Trimbur as Julie
- David Paymer as Doctor
- Aaron Stanford as Hades, a character in Purgatory
- Dendrie Taylor as Heather's mother
- Lauren Weedman as Cheryl
- Luis Fernandez-Gil as tow worker
- Sharaé Nikai as nurse

== Production ==
In June 2019, it was announced Alison Brie would star in the film, with Jeff Baena directing from a screenplay he wrote with Brie. Jay Duplass and Mark Duplass serve as executive producers under their Duplass Brothers Productions banner, with Netflix distributing.

== Release ==
Horse Girl had its world premiere at the Sundance Film Festival on January 27, 2020. The film was released on Netflix on February 7, 2020.

== Reception ==
On the review aggregator website Rotten Tomatoes, the film holds an approval rating of 71% based on 58 reviews, with an average rating of 6.3/10. The website's critics consensus reads, "Horse Girl proves unwilling or unable to explore the deeper themes it addresses, but this unusual drama is anchored by Alison Brie's committed performance." On Metacritic, which assigns a weighted average score out of 100 to reviews from mainstream critics, the film received an average score of 61 based on 17 reviews, indicating "generally favorable" reviews.

Nick Allen of RogerEbert.com reviewed the film after its world premiere at the Sundance Film Festival. In a three-star review: "The sincerity that Brie brings to her full-fledged embodiment of mental illness is major, and in turn helps Horse Girl overcome its tricky storytelling."

Shortly after the film's release, filmmaker Joe Badon claimed in a Facebook post that Horse Girl plagiarized his film The God Inside My Ear and listed the commonalities of the two films' plot points.

== See also ==
- Mental disorders in film
- Schizophrenia
