= Joshy =

2016 film by Jeff Baena

- Theatrical release poster
- Directed by: Jeff Baena
- Written by: Jeff Baena
- Produced by: Elizabeth Destro; Adam Pally; Michael Zakin
- Starring: Thomas Middleditch; Adam Pally; Alex Ross Perry; Nick Kroll; Brett Gelman; Jenny Slate; Lauren Graham
- Cinematography: Patrice Lucien Cochet
- Edited by: Ryan Brown
- Music by: Devendra Banhart; Noah Georgeson; Josiah Steinbrick
- Production companies: StarStream Media; Bow + Arrow Entertainment; Destro Films; American Zoetrope
- Distributed by: Lionsgate Premiere
- Release dates: January 24, 2016 (Sundance); August 12, 2016 (United States)
- Running time: 93 minutes
- Country: United States
- Language: English

Joshy is a 2016 American comedy-drama film written and directed by Jeff Baena. It stars Thomas Middleditch, Adam Pally, Alex Ross Perry, Nick Kroll, Brett Gelman, Jenny Slate and Lauren Graham. It was shown in the U.S. Dramatic Competition section at the 2016 Sundance Film Festival. The film was released on August 12, 2016, by Lionsgate Premiere.

== Plot ==
Josh returns home from work on his birthday. His fiancée Rachel agrees to cook dinner while Josh is at the gym. Josh returns home to find out that Rachel asphyxiated herself with a belt.

Four months later, Josh along with his friends Ari, Adam and Eric decide to spend the weekend, which was supposed to be Josh's bachelor party, at a ranch in Ojai. At a bar the first night, Ari meets a girl named Jodi and finds a connection with her; Adam finds out that his girlfriend wants to break up with him; and Eric, wanting to keep the night alive, invites his friend Greg over. Jodi, being locked out of her place, crashes with the guys at their place after a fun night.

The next morning, their friend Aaron arrives with his wife and child only to find the place overrun with drugs and alcohol. An argument erupts between Eric and Aaron over the matter of Josh's state of mind and the current situation. Aaron storms off with his family and the men spend the day out with Greg and learn about Rachel's death from Ari. After getting high, Greg becomes extremely emotional due to his troubled past. They head to the bar and find Jodi and her friends there. Ari tells Jodi that he is married which makes Jodi distance herself from Ari. They return home downcast, so Eric invites two strippers to keep the night alive, and an argument breaks out between Eric and Adam. Josh and Eric realize that a mysterious man is stalking them and try to confront him, but fail.

The next day Eric invites a prostitute, one for all of them, but the party is interrupted by the arrival of Rachel's parents who are there to confront Josh. The parents ask for details of the events leading up to Rachel's death, accusing Josh of hiding his guilt by colluding with the police. They show Josh photos of the men with the stripper from the previous night—revealing that the “stalker” had been hired to spy on them—and inform him that a second autopsy report found Rachel’s supposed suicide to be inconclusive. Josh, in a fit of rage, tears the bag they brought with them only to find a wire inside it, implying that they were there to get him to confess to the murder of their daughter. Josh asks them to leave and goes to his friends and opens up. They console him, and the group decides to finally play the board game Adam wanted to play since the beginning.

The group spends the last night of the weekend playing the "very complex board game" and is joined by Jodi. After the game, Jodi gets up to leave so Ari walks her to the door and kisses her. Jodi realizes that Ari is a married man, ends their embrace abruptly and walks out. The next morning the group bids farewell to each other and decides to meet again some time soon. Josh and Ari are the last to leave. The film ends with Josh on the verge of saying something to Ari, only to hesitate as Ari drives away.

== Cast ==
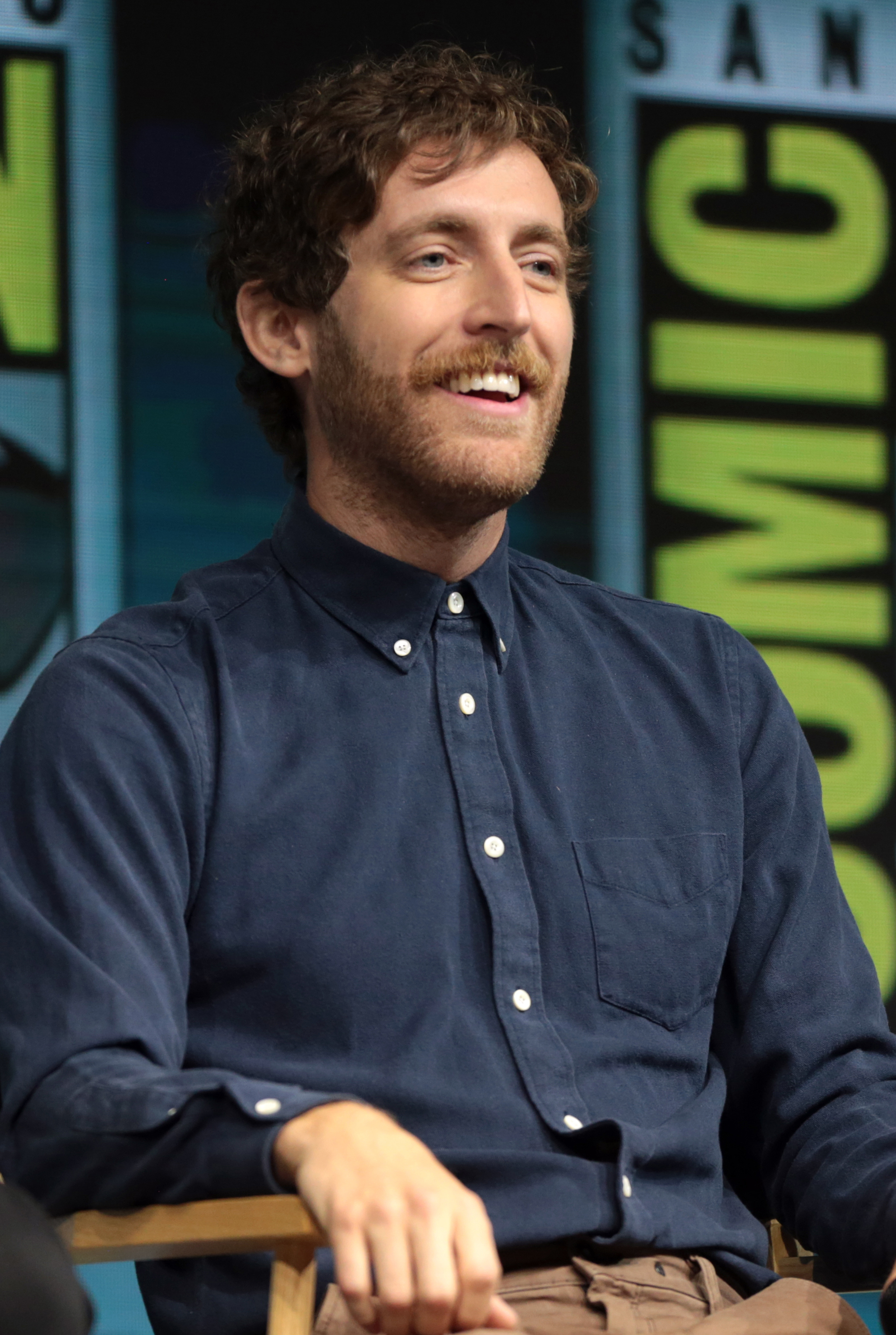
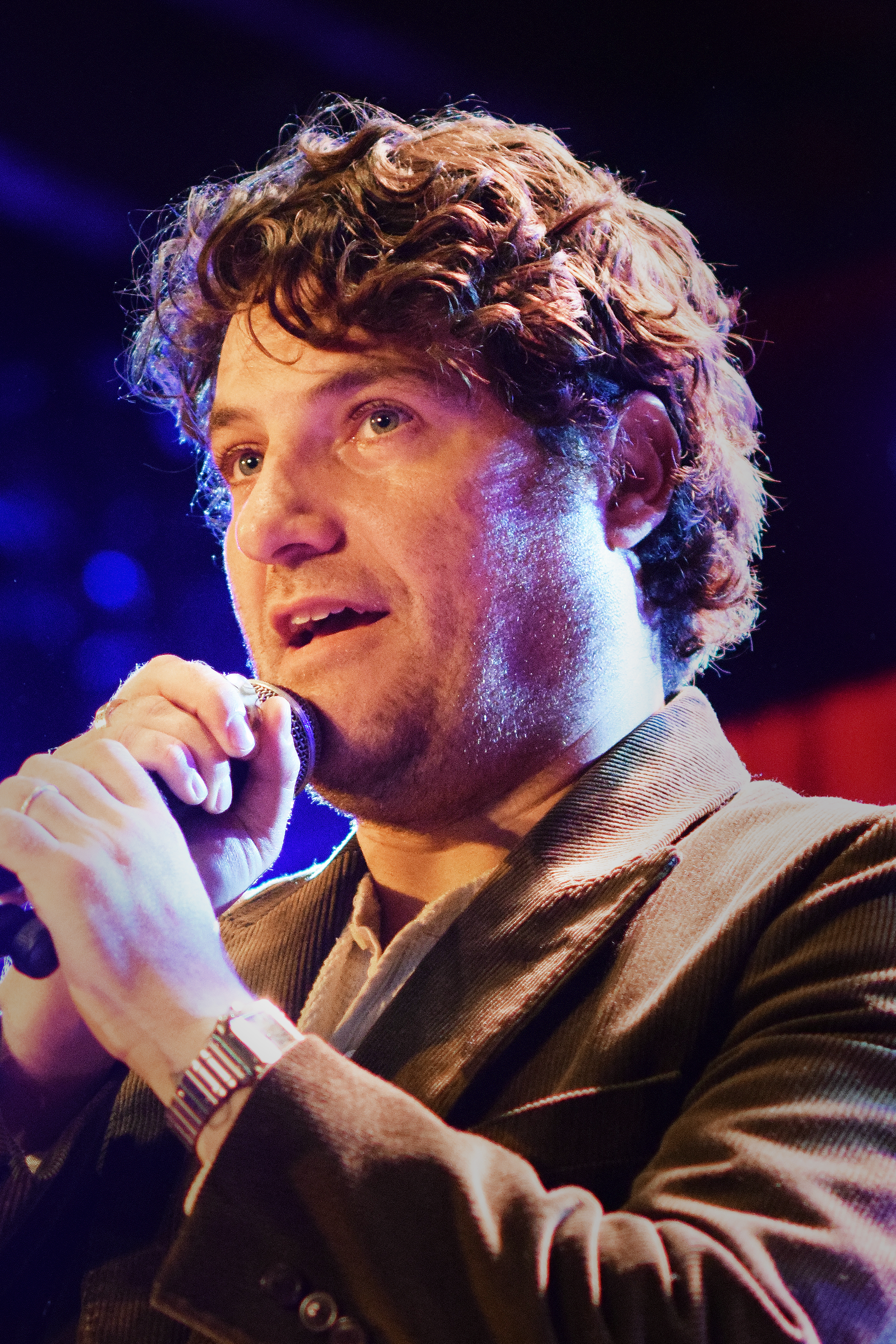
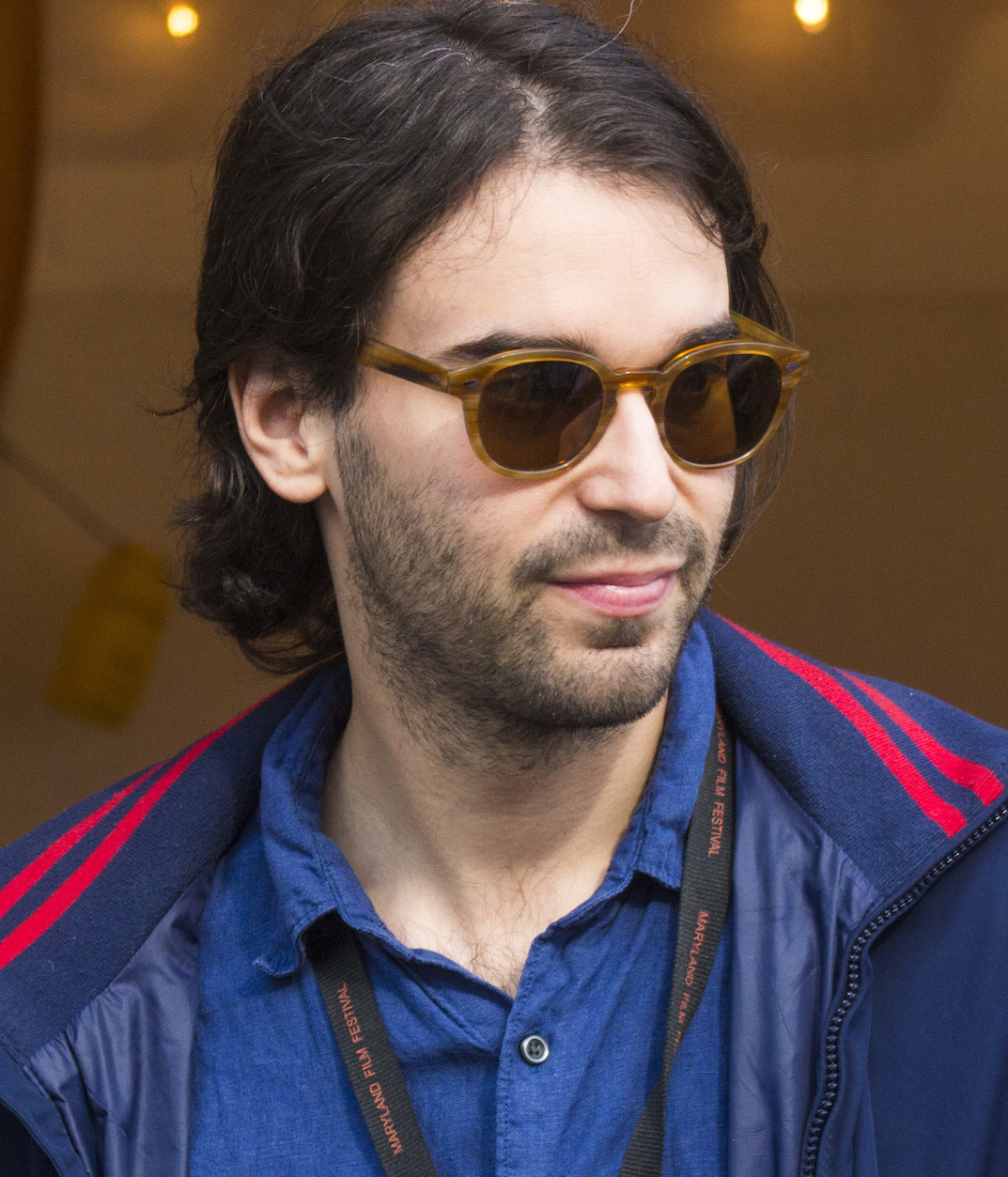
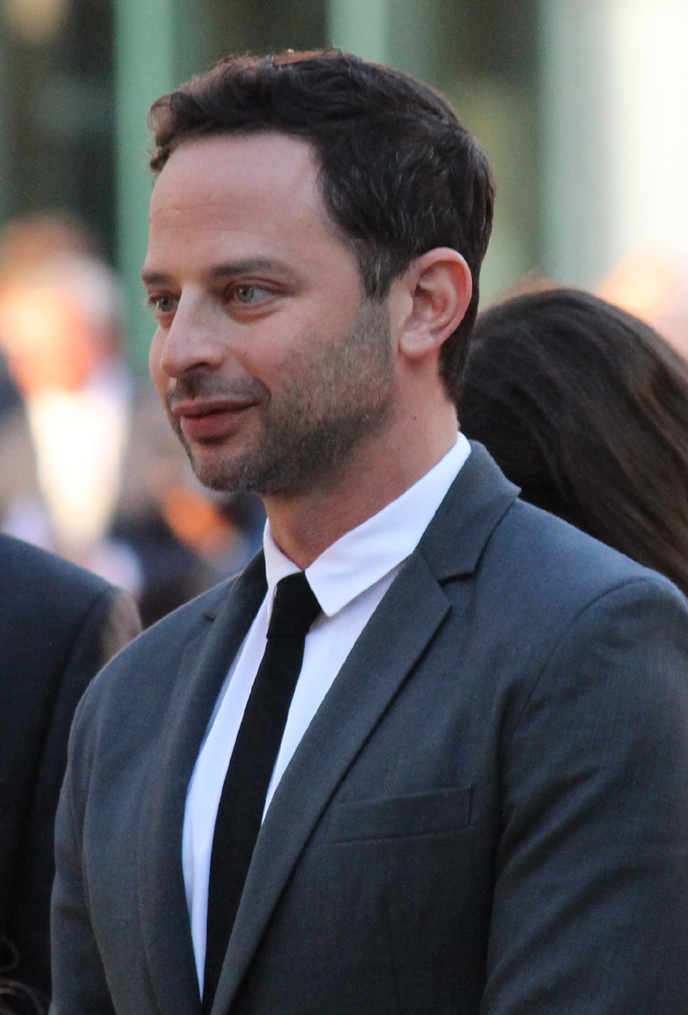
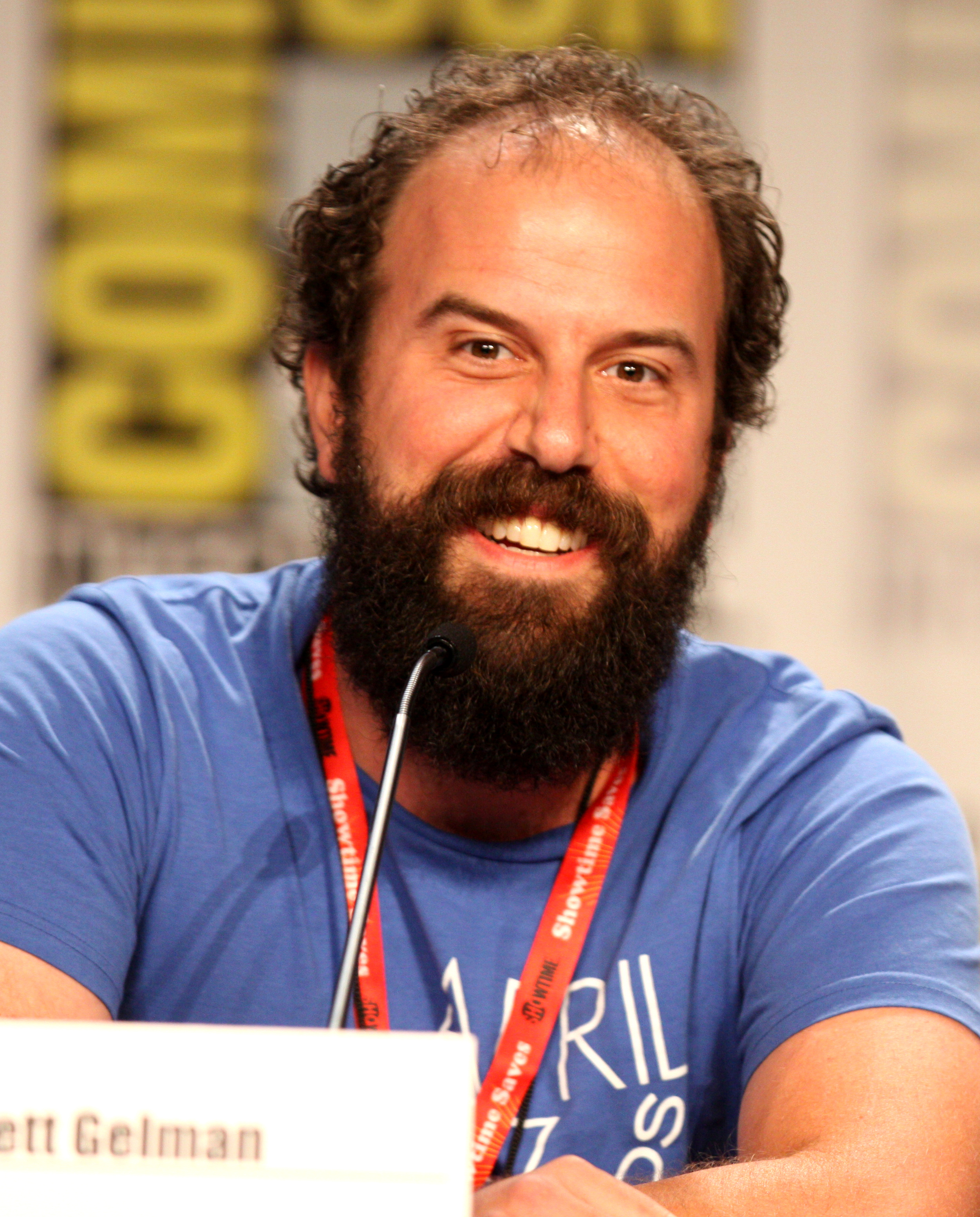
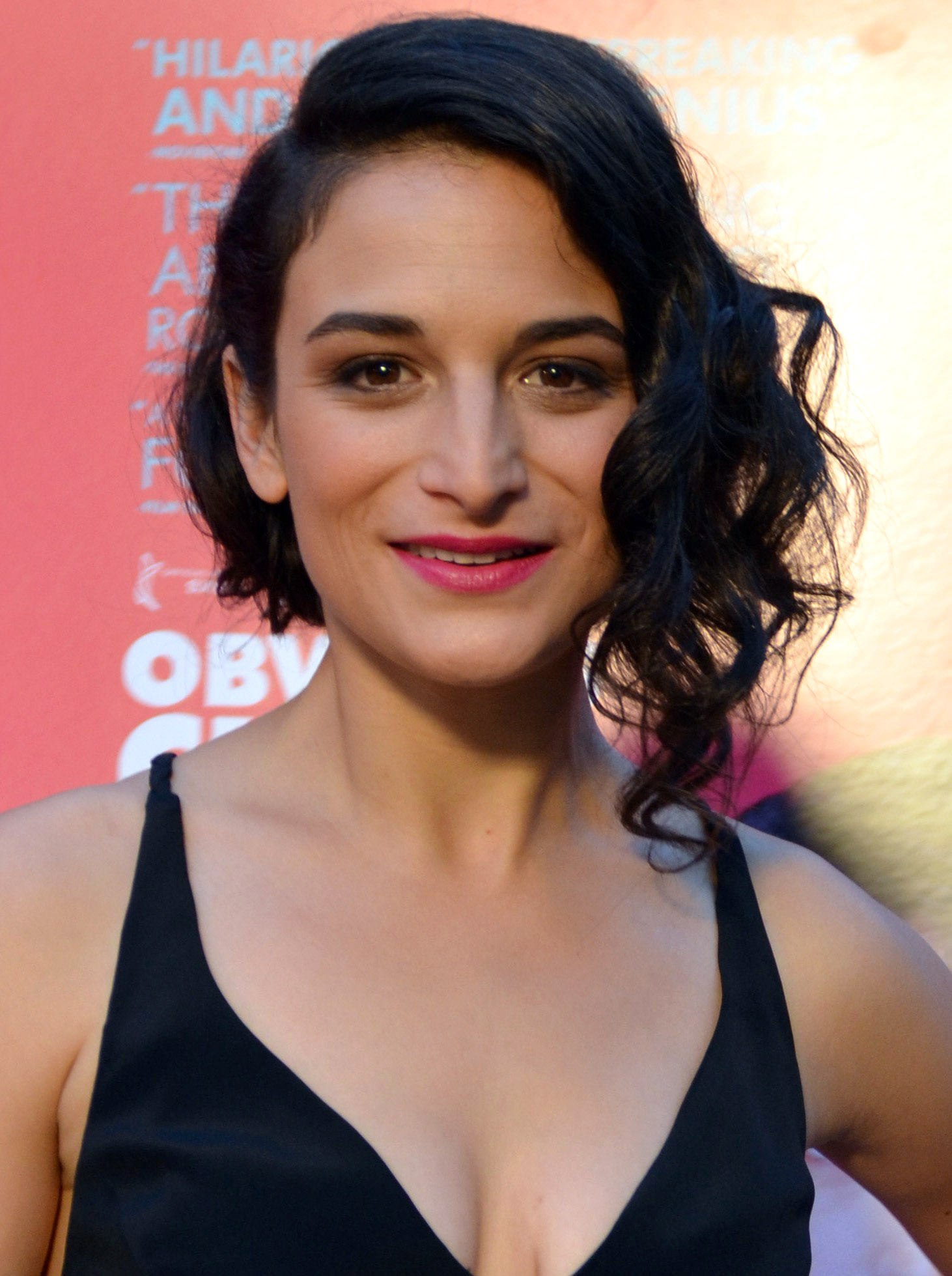
Thomas Middleditch, Adam Pally, Alex Ross Perry, Nick Kroll, Brett Gelman and Jenny Slate play the film's six lead characters.
- Thomas Middleditch as Josh
- Adam Pally as Ari
- Alex Ross Perry as Adam
- Nick Kroll as Eric
- Brett Gelman as Greg
- Jenny Slate as Jodi
- Aubrey Plaza as Jen
- Joe Swanberg as Aaron
- Kris Swanberg as Anita
- Lauren Graham as Katee
- Alison Brie as Rachel
- Jake Johnson as Reggie
- Lisa Edelstein as Claudia
- Lauren Weedman as Isadora
- Paul Reiser as Steve
- Frankie Shaw as Crystal
- Paul Weitz as Private Investigator

== Production ==
Production on the film lasted 15 days, only shooting off a 20-page outline, with the rest of the dialogue improvised by the cast. In December 2015, it was announced that Devendra Banhart would compose the score for the film.

== Release ==
The film had its world premiere at the 2016 Sundance Film Festival on January 24, 2016. In March 2016, Lionsgate Premiere and Hulu acquired distribution rights to the film. The film was released on August 12, 2016.

== Critical reception ==
Joshy has received positive reviews from film critics. It holds an 81% rating on review aggregator website Rotten Tomatoes, based on 26 reviews, with an average rating of 6.4/10. The site's consensus states, "Writer/director Jeff Baena and an able cast of comedic actors strike a unique, disarmingly heartfelt blend of dark humor and tragedy with Joshy." On Metacritic, the film holds a rating of 62 out of 100, based on 10 critics, indicating "generally favorable" reviews.

Writing for Flavorwire, Jason Bailey gave the film a positive review, writing: "Ace performances all around, each perching on the razor's edge between comedy and tragedy, and falling freely from one side to the other."

Geoff Berkshire of Variety gave the film a more mixed review, writing: "Boasting a hodgepodge of strong comic voices riffing their way through underdeveloped characters, writer-director Jeff Baena’s second feature after the under-appreciated zombie romantic comedy Life After Beth is an altogether looser affair, but rarely to its benefit. The name cast guarantees ancillary interest, though theatrical life should be even briefer than Beth’s.”
