= John Reynolds (actor) =

American actor

- Reynolds at the 2025 Sundance Film Festival
- Born: John Paul Reynolds; August 5, 1991 (age 35); Madison, Wisconsin, U.S.
- Occupations: Actor, writer
- Years active: 2013–present

John Paul Reynolds (born August 5, 1991) is an American actor and writer best known for his lead roles as Andrew "Drew" Gardner on the TBS dark comedy series Search Party (2016–22) and Caleb Duffy on the Hulu romantic comedy miniseries Four Weddings and a Funeral (2019).

Reynolds is also known for his recurring roles as Officer Callahan on the Netflix sci-fi horror series Stranger Things (2016–2025) and Detective Matt Saracusa on the second season of the Showtime survival horror thriller series Yellowjackets (2023).

== Early life ==
John Reynolds was born on August 5, 1991, in Madison, Wisconsin, where he attended Madison West High School.

== Career ==
Reynolds began his career in Chicago at the age of 18. He graduated from the IO Training Center and the Second City Conservatory in Chicago, and performed regularly at IO Chicago, The Annoyance, Chemically Imbalanced Comedy, The Playground, and Upstairs Gallery. He was also a part of the Kill All Comedy collective along with comedians Conner O'Malley and Gary Richardson.

Reynolds has said he based his Search Party character Drew Gardner on his experience growing up in the Midwest: "I grew up in Madison, Wisconsin, and I based him as a guy I would know in the Midwest who sees his brothers grow up a certain way, and wants to maintain that status quo with his family, and doesn’t want to be in any spotlight."

In 2023 Reynolds co-performed the live comedy show No Tengo Escuela with comedian Carmen Christopher, with performances at Union Hall in New York and the Soho Theatre in London.

== Filmography ==
=== Film ===
Year	Title	Role	Notes
2013	Party Time Party Time	Lewk	
2018	Most Likely to Murder	Perkins	
2020	Save Yourselves!	Jack	
2020	Horse Girl	Darren	
2020	Cowboys	Grover	
2023	Modern Man	Greg Trowel	
2023	Genie	Marvin	
2023	Millennial Hunter	Kyle	Voice
2025	Oh, Hi!	Kenny	
2026	Seekers of Infinite Love		
2026	Never Change!	Sunny	Writer
2026	Purgatory	Joe Gravel	

=== Television ===
Year	Title	Role	Notes
2014–2016	The Chris Gethard Show	Todd Watch / Lawrence	2 episodes
2015	Red Oaks	Bartender	Episode: "The Wedding"
2015	Master of None	Excited Dude	Episode: "Finale"
2015–2016	The Special Without Brett Davis	Brian Wilson / Ralph	4 episodes
2016	Netflix Presents: The Characters	Employee #3	Episode: "Tim Robinson"
2016	High Maintenance	Aaron	Episode: "Selfie"
2016	Thanksgiving	Chad Morgan	Main role; 8 episodes
2016-2022	Stranger Things	Officer Callahan	16 episodes
2016–2022	Search Party	Drew Gardner	Main role
2018	The Shivering Truth	Mr. Lawson (voice)	Episode: "Constadeath"
2019	Miracle Workers	Mason	2 episodes
2019	Four Weddings and a Funeral	Caleb Duffy	Main role
2020	Wild Life	Glenn (voice)	6 episodes
2022	Killing It	Nate	2 episodes
2022	The Sex Lives of College Girls	Dan O'Connell	Episode: "Doppelbanger"
2023	Up Here	Derek	Episode: "Labels"
2023	Yellowjackets	Jay / Officer Matt Saracusa	5 episodes
2023	Teenage Euthanasia	Van (voice)	Episode: "Mother's Day"
2024	Ghosts	Nico	Episode: “Halloween 3: The Ghost Who Wouldn’t Leave”
2025	Adults	Brian	Episode: "The Mail"
