= The Homecoming (disambiguation) =

The Homecoming is a play by Harold Pinter.

The Homecoming may also refer to:

== Film ==
- The Homecoming (film), a 1973 film based on Pinter's play

== Literature ==
- The Homecoming: A Novel About Spencer's Mountain, a 1970 novel by Earl Hamner Jr., which was adapted into the 1971 TV film (see below)
- The Homecoming, a 1975 novel by Norah Lofts; the second installment in the Suffolk Trilogy
- The Homecoming, a 1989 novel by Barry B. Longyear
- The Homecoming, a 1989 play by August Wilson
- The Homecoming, a 1997 novel by Marion Chesney; the sixth installment in The Daughters of Mannerling series
- The Homecoming, a 1999 novel by Ben M. Baglio, under the pseudonym Lucy Daniels; the sixth installment in the Jess the Border Collie series
- Joshua: The Homecoming, a 1999 novel by Joseph F. Girzone; the sixth installment in the Joshua series
- The Homecoming, a 2001 novel by Cynthia Harrod-Eagles; the twenty-fourth installment in The Morland Dynasty series
- The Homecoming, a 2005 novel by Anne Marie Winston
- "The Homecoming" (short story), a 2011 short story by Mike Resnick
- The Homecoming, a 2019 novel by Andrew Pyper

== Television ==
=== Episodes ===
- "The Homecoming", Almost Never series 2, episodes 7–8 (2019)
- "The Homecoming", Barefoot Contessa season 1, episode 7 (2003)
- "The Homecoming", Border Patrol (American) episode 24 (1959)
- "The Homecoming", Bridget Loves Bernie episode 12 (1972)
- "The Homecoming", Burden of Truth season 4, episode 6 (2021)
- "The Homecoming", Casualty series 11, episode 16 (1996)
- "The Homecoming", Crossing Lines season 2, episode 2 (2014)
- "The Homecoming", Cuckoo season 1, episode 1 (2012)
- "The Homecoming", Daniel Boone season 6, episode 23 (1970)
- "The Homecoming", Disband season 1, episode 1 (2008)
- "The Homecoming", Dynasty (1981) season 6, episode 2 (1985)
- "The Homecoming", Edgemont season 4, episode 1 (2002)
- "The Homecoming", Family Ties season 2, episode 2 (1983)
- "The Homecoming", Frontline (American) season 13, episode 14 (1995)
- "The Homecoming", Hardcastle and McCormick season 1, episodes 19–20 (1984)
- "The Homecoming", Hot Line season 1, episode 3 (1995)
- "The Homecoming", Karagar part 2, episode 9 (2023)
- "The Homecoming", Kyle XY season 2, episode 2 (2007)
- "The Homecoming", Lilyhammer season 3, episode 3 (2014)
- "The Homecoming", Marion and Geoff series 1, episode 3 (2000)
- "The Homecoming", Medic season 2, episode 17 (1956)
- "The Homecoming", My Three Sons season 8, episode 6 (1967)
- "The Homecoming", New Captain Scarlet series 1, episode 5 (2005)
- "The Homecoming", Norsemen season 1, episode 1 (2016)
- "The Homecoming", Robin's Nest series 6, episode 3 (1981)
- "The Homecoming", Robotboy season 1, episode 15b (2006)
- "The Homecoming", Saved by the Bell: The College Years episode 6 (1993)
- "The Homecoming", Star Trek: Deep Space Nine season 2, episode 1 (1994)
- "The Homecoming", Street Legal season 3, episode 5 (1988)
- "The Homecoming", Switched at Birth season 1, episode 10 (2011)
- "The Homecoming", The 1940s House episode 5 (2001)
- "The Homecoming", The Fugitive season 1, episode 28 (1964)
- "The Homecoming", The Long, Hot Summer episode 1 (1965)
- "The Homecoming", The Musketeers series 1, episode 5 (2014)
- "The Homecoming", The Nancy Walker Show episode 1 (1976)
- "The Homecoming", The O.C. season 1, episode 11 (2003)
- "The Homecoming", The Onedin Line series 7, episode 2 (1979)
- "The Homecoming", The Outsider (1983) episode 5 (1983)
- "The Homecoming", The Trouble with Larry episode 1 (1993)
- "The Homecoming", Watership Down season 2, episode 13 (2000)

=== Shows ===
- The Homecoming: A Christmas Story, a 1971 television film, the pilot for the series The Waltons
- The Homecoming (TV series), a Singaporean Chinese-language drama

== Other uses ==
- The Homecoming (statue), an American statue honoring members of the sea services
- The Homecoming (album), a 1975 album by Hagood Hardy, or the title song
- The Homecoming (painting), an 1887 painting by Arnold Böcklin

== See also ==
- Homecoming (disambiguation)
- Coming Home (disambiguation)
