= Homecoming (disambiguation) =

Homecoming is a tradition at many North American schools.

Homecoming(s) or The Homecoming may also refer to:

== Books ==
=== Drama and poetry ===
- Homecoming (2001 play), by Lauren Weedman
- Homecoming (2021 play), by Chetachi Igbokwe
- "Homecoming" (poem), 1968, by Bruce Dawe
- Homecoming (poetry collection), 2021, by Elfie Shiosaki
- Homecoming, a 1984 poetry collection by Julia Alvarez
- The Homecoming, a play by Harold Pinter written in 1964 and first published in 1965

=== Novels ===
- Homecoming, 2023, by Kate Morton
- Homecoming (novel), a 1981 young adult novel by Cynthia Voigt
- Homecoming, 1992, by Matthew Costello
- Homecoming (Kiryō), 1948, by Jirō Osaragi
- Homecoming, 2015, in the series The 100 by Kass Morgan
- Homecoming, a 2003 novel set in the Star Trek universe
- Homecoming Saga, a 1992–1995 novel series by Orson Scott Card
- Homecoming, a 2015–2016 novel series by R. A. Salvatore
- Homecomings (novel), 1956, by C. P. Snow in the Strangers and Brothers series

=== Short stories ===
- "Homecoming" (short story), by Franz Kafka
- "Homecoming", a 1946 short story by Ray Bradbury
- "Homecoming", a short story by Robin Hobb in the 2003 anthology Legends II

=== Nonfiction ===
- Homecoming: When the Soldiers Returned from Vietnam, a 1989 book by Bob Greene
- Homecoming: Essays on African and Caribbean Literature, Culture, and Politics, a 1972 book by Ngũgĩ wa Thiong'o
- Homecoming: Reclaiming and Championing Your Inner Child, a 1990 book by John Bradshaw

== Film and TV ==
=== Film ===
- Homecoming (1928 film), a German drama starring Lars Hanson
- Homecoming (1934 film), a Chinese film starring Ruan Lingyu
- Homecoming (1941 film) (German: Heimkehr), a German propaganda film
- Homecoming (1948 film), a romantic drama starring Clark Gable and Lana Turner
- Homecoming (1984 film), a Hong Kong film starring Siqin Gaowa and Josephine Koo
- Homecoming (1996 film), a TV adaptation of Cynthia Voigt's novel
- Homecoming (2003 film), a Philippine film of the 2000s directed by Gil Portes
- Homecoming (2004 film), field-produced by Roko Belic
- Home Coming (2006 film), a Greek-Turkish drama
- Homecoming (2009 film), an indie-thriller starring Mischa Barton, Matt Long and Jessica Stroup
- Homecoming (2011 film), a Singaporean film starring Jack Neo
- Homecoming, 2011, starring Brea Grant
- Homecoming, a 2013 short film produced by Idil Ibrahim
- Homecoming (2019 Indonesian film), a drama directed by Adriyanto Dewo
- Homecoming (2023 film), a French drama
- Home Coming (2022 film), a Chinese drama
- Homecoming: A Film by Beyoncé, a 2019 concert film directed by and starring Beyoncé
- Spider-Man: Homecoming, a 2017 superhero film starring Tom Holland
- How to Train Your Dragon: Homecoming, a 2019 holiday special

=== Television ===
==== Episodes ====
- "Homecoming" (American Dragon: Jake Long), 2007
- "Homecoming" (Buffy the Vampire Slayer), 1998
- "Homecoming" (Chicago P.D.), 2018
- "Homecoming" (Dawson's Creek), 1999
- "Homecoming" (ER), 2000
- "Homecoming" (Falling Skies), 2012
- "Homecoming" (Friday Night Lights), 2006
- "Homecoming" (Ghost Whisperer), 2005
- "Homecoming" (Glee), 2015
- "Homecoming" (Heroes), 2006
- "Homecoming" (I Love Lucy), 1955
- "Homecoming" (Lost), 2005
- "Homecoming" (Masters of Horror), 2005
- "Homecoming" (Miss Guided), 2008
- "Homecoming" (Naruto), 2009
- "Homecoming" (New Girl), 2016
- "Homecoming" (Once Upon a Time), 2018
- "Homecoming" (One Day at a Time), 2018
- "Homecoming" (The Penguin), 2024
- "Homecoming" (Roseanne), 1993
- "Homecoming" (Smallville), 2010
- "Homecoming" (Spender), 1991
- "Homecoming" (Star Wars Rebels), 2016
- "Homecoming" (Stargate SG-1), 2003
- "Homecoming" (Supergirl), 2017
- "Homecoming" (The Twilight Zone), 2003
- "Homecoming" (The Vampire Diaries), 2011
- "Homecoming" (The Wire), 2004
- "Homecoming: A Shot in D'Arc", an episode of Clone High, 2002

==== Other uses in television ====
- Homecoming (TV series), a 2018 Amazon TV series based on Gimlet Media's podcast (see below)
- Homecoming with Rick Reilly, an American sports program, broadcast 2009–10
- The Homecoming: A Christmas Story, a 1971 TV movie which inspired The Waltons
  - The Waltons: Homecoming, a 2021 remake

== Music ==
=== Albums ===
- Homecoming (America album), 1972
- Homecoming (Art Farmer album), 1971
- Homecoming (Bethel Music album), 2021
- Homecoming (Bill Evans album), 1999
- Homecoming (Craig's Brother album), 1998
- Homecoming (Ed Bruce album), 1985
- Homecoming (Gateway album), 1995
- Homecoming (Nazareth album), 2002
- Homecoming (Short Stack album), 2015
- Homecoming!, by Elmo Hope, 1961
- Homecoming: Live at the Village Vanguard, by Dexter Gordon, 1976
- Homecoming: The Bluegrass Album, by Joe Diffie, 2010
- Homecoming: The Live Album, by Beyoncé, 2019
- Homecoming – Live from Ireland, by Celtic Women, 2018
- Homecoming – A Scottish Fantasy, by Nicola Benedetti, 2014

=== Band ===
- Homecomings (band), Japanese band

=== EPs and mixtapes ===
- Homecoming (EP), by Sammy Adams, 2013
- Homecoming, EP by ASTR, 2015
- Homecoming, a mixtape by Machine Gun Kelly, 2008

=== Songs ===
- "Homecoming" (Hey Monday song), 2008
- "Homecoming" (Kanye West song), 2008
- "Homecoming", by Green Day from American Idiot
- "Homecoming", by Lil Uzi Vert from Eternal Atake
- "Homecoming", by Linkin Park from LP Underground 12.0
- "Homecoming", by Robert Randolph and the Family Band from Colorblind
- "Homecoming", by Taking Back Sunday from Tidal Wave
- "Homecoming", by The Teenagers from Reality Check

== Other uses ==
- AEW Homecoming, an annual professional wrestling pay-per-view event held by All Elite Wrestling
- Homecoming (podcast), a fictional podcast by Gimlet Media, with Catherine Keener, Oscar Isaac and David Schwimmer
- Homecoming (photograph), a 1944 Pulitzer Prize Winning image captured by Earle Bunker
- Homecoming: The Magazine, a publication founded by Gloria Gaither
- Impact Wrestling Homecoming, an annual professional wrestling pay-per-view event held by Impact Wrestling
- Silent Hill: Homecoming, a 2008 survival horror video game

== See also ==
- The Homecoming (disambiguation)
- Coming Home (disambiguation)
- Homecoming King (disambiguation)
- Homecoming Queen (disambiguation)
- Patriation, also known as "homecoming"
- Ghar Wapsi (lit. 'Home Return'), term for conversion to Hinduism in India
