= United States Servicemen's Fund =

American anti-war support organization

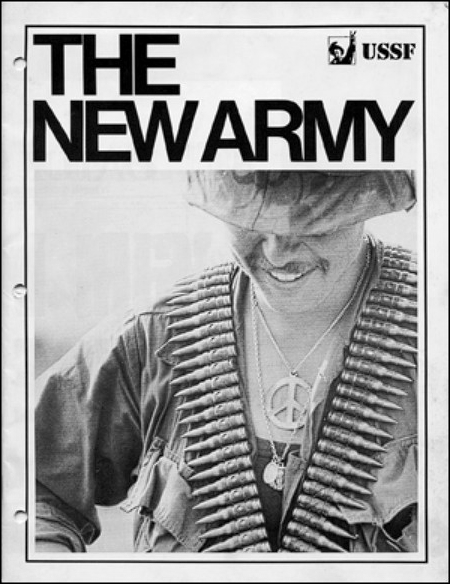
The New Army Pamphlet by the United States Servicemen's Fund 1971

The United States Servicemen's Fund (USSF) was a support organization for soldier and sailor resistance to the Vietnam War and the U.S. military that was founded in late 1968 and continued through 1973. It was an "umbrella agency" that funded GI underground newspapers and GI Coffeehouses, as well as providing logistical support for the GI antiwar movement ranging from antiwar films and speakers to legal assistance and staff. USSF described itself as supporting a GI defined movement "to work for an end to the Vietnam war" and "to eradicate the indoctrination and oppression that they see so clearly every day."

== Founding ==
USSF was started by several prominent anti-Vietnam War activists, including Army Captain and medical Doctor Howard Levy, initially working clandestinely from Leavenworth military prison where he had been sentenced for refusing to train Green Beret medics on their way to Vietnam; Fred Gardner, ex-Army reservist and founder of the first GI antiwar coffeehouse; Dr. Benjamin Spock and Professors Noam Chomsky; and Robert Zevin. In 1967, Gardner moved to Columbia, South Carolina, near Fort Jackson, the U.S. Army's largest training base and site of Dr. Levy's resistance and court-martial. He was determined to prove that GIs would, as he put it, "rather be making love to the music of Jimi Hendrix than war to the lies of Lyndon Johnson." With Donna Mickelson he opened the UFO counterculture coffeehouse, which was almost instantly popular among local young people and soldiers from the Fort. By early 1968, with encouragement from the UFO, 35 soldiers from the Fort organized an antiwar pray-in in front of the base chapel.

As the word of GIs resisting the war began to spread in the broader peace movement, previously skeptical antiwar leaders began to support and help raise funds for additional GI support work. This led in mid-1968 to the formation of the Summer of Support (SOS) headed by soon to be Chicago Seven defendant Rennie Davis, which channeled money and people power towards more GI coffeehouses. Its purpose was "to bring to public attention the extent of rank and file opposition to the war and military." By the fall of 1968 four coffeehouse had been established and the GI movement was gaining national recognition. Gardner and Dr. Levy joined forces and helped to lead these efforts into the formation of USSF, with the West Coast branches calling themselves Support Our Soldiers, a tip of the hat to the SOS legacy from the Summer of Support. According to the historian Derek Seidman, "Continuity between the UFO, SOS and USSF was key to the latter’s success." Gardner and Dr. Levy helped raise money and promote the organization, with Levy often being the "source of original ideas about what the organization should undertake", while Mickelson and Judy Olasov did much of the day-to-day work helping individual coffeehouses start up. Robert Zevin became the organization's treasurer and office manager while Josh Gould, one of the founders of the Oleo Strut coffeehouse, worked in the Cambridge and New York City offices starting in 1970. Gardner and Dr. Levy emphasized the importance of GIs "organizing themselves, with the civilian antiwar movement offering material and ideological support."

== Activity and growth ==
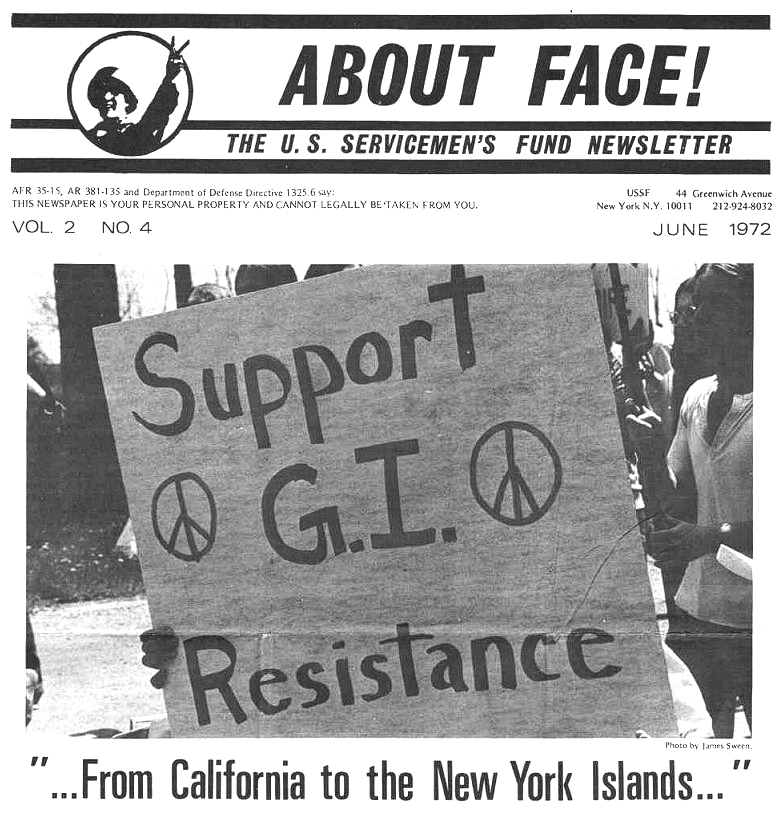
June 1972 cover of About Face, newsletter of the United States Servicemen's Fund

The next two to three years were the height of the GI antiwar movement and USSF played a key role by supporting it financially and helping to tie it together through bulletins, newspapers, staff training and traveling activists who facilitated communication between projects. In the summer of 1971 they organized a training course for potential project staffers which was attended by almost 50 people. The manual for this course so worried the House Committee on Internal Security that they entered it into the Congressional Record. With support from USSF, the GI antiwar and coffeehouse movement grew from a few projects into an international GI dissent network. A list of USSF sponsors and contributors shows that it was supported by many of the most prominent people in the antiwar movement, including (in addition to those mentioned above) Bella Abzug, Shirley Chisholm, William Sloane Coffin, Ossie Davis, David Dellinger, James Forman, Betty Friedan, I.F. Stone, and Jane Fonda. Its publications also received support from several labor unions. In 1971, USSF published a pamphlet called The New Army (see cover image above) which listed a total of 76 "organizing projects, coffeehouses, and newspapers" they were supporting, as well as six USSF offices. USSF was probably the main way most antiwar civilians could interact with and support the growing GI movement.

As the GI movement grew, USSF was able to use its connections among GIs and with mainstream reporters to help spread stories the U.S. military was attempting to keep hidden. Paul Lauter, who led USSF from mid-1971 to mid-1972, described this in his memoir observing that among GIs, "nothing the military started up remained secret for very long." He recalled passing GI stories on to the news media about secret B-52 bombing runs from Guam which, once revealed, generated increased antiwar sentiment. The Nixon administration, Lauter said, viewed this "process as a form of espionage", but "it was simply GI democracy at work."

== The FTA Show ==
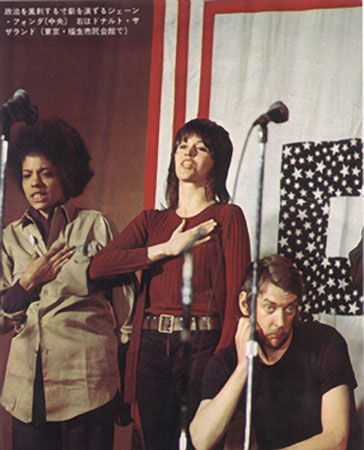
Rita Martenson, Jane Fonda and Donald Sutherland

Perhaps USSF's most well known project was the FTA Show, an anti-Vietnam War road show for GIs designed as a response to Bob Hope's patriotic and pro-war USO tour. It was the brainchild of Dr. Levy, who met with Jane Fonda on the set of Klute, convincing her to participate and help pull it together. Fonda went on to recruit a number of actors, entertainers, musicians and others, including actors Donald Sutherland, Peter Boyle, Garry Goodrow, comedian and civil rights activist Dick Gregory, and singers Country Joe McDonald, Nina Simone, Len Chandler, Swamp Dogg, Holly Near and Rita Martinson. USSF became the official sponsor of the show during its U.S. phase, with Gardner as the Tour's "stage manager and liaison to the coffeehouse staffs."

In the spring of 1971, the show, referred to as "political vaudeville" by Fonda and The New York Times, began to visit military towns throughout the U.S. and then Asia. At a press conference in New York City, Fonda and Dr. Levy announced their plans to kick off the Tour in Fayetteville, North Carolina, near the Fort Bragg Army base. The initial plans were for "an ambitious twenty-stop tour" of U.S. military bases, and the final results were even more expansive. According to Fonda in her autobiography, they performed "for some fifteen thousand GIs near major U.S. military bases" before heading overseas where they "did twenty-one performances". All told, "between March and December of 1971, the show toured to over 64,000 troops, playing near, but never on, bases in North Carolina, California, Washington, Texas, Idaho, New Jersey, Okinawa, Japan, the Philippines, and Hawaii." And this, even when GIs "might risk official or unofficial discipline for attending an antiwar show". The historian Sarah King, quoting a The Washington Post reporter, described the show's popularity as "notable, considering the fact that 'it wasn't easy' for active-duty military personnel to attend FTA. Military authorities routinely 'put out misinformation about the time and place,' and GIs had to travel at their own expense (though the show itself was free). They also risked being photographed and harassed; Fonda recalls that the CID, 'the military equivalent of the CIA, was always around taking snapshots.'"

== GI coffeehouses ==
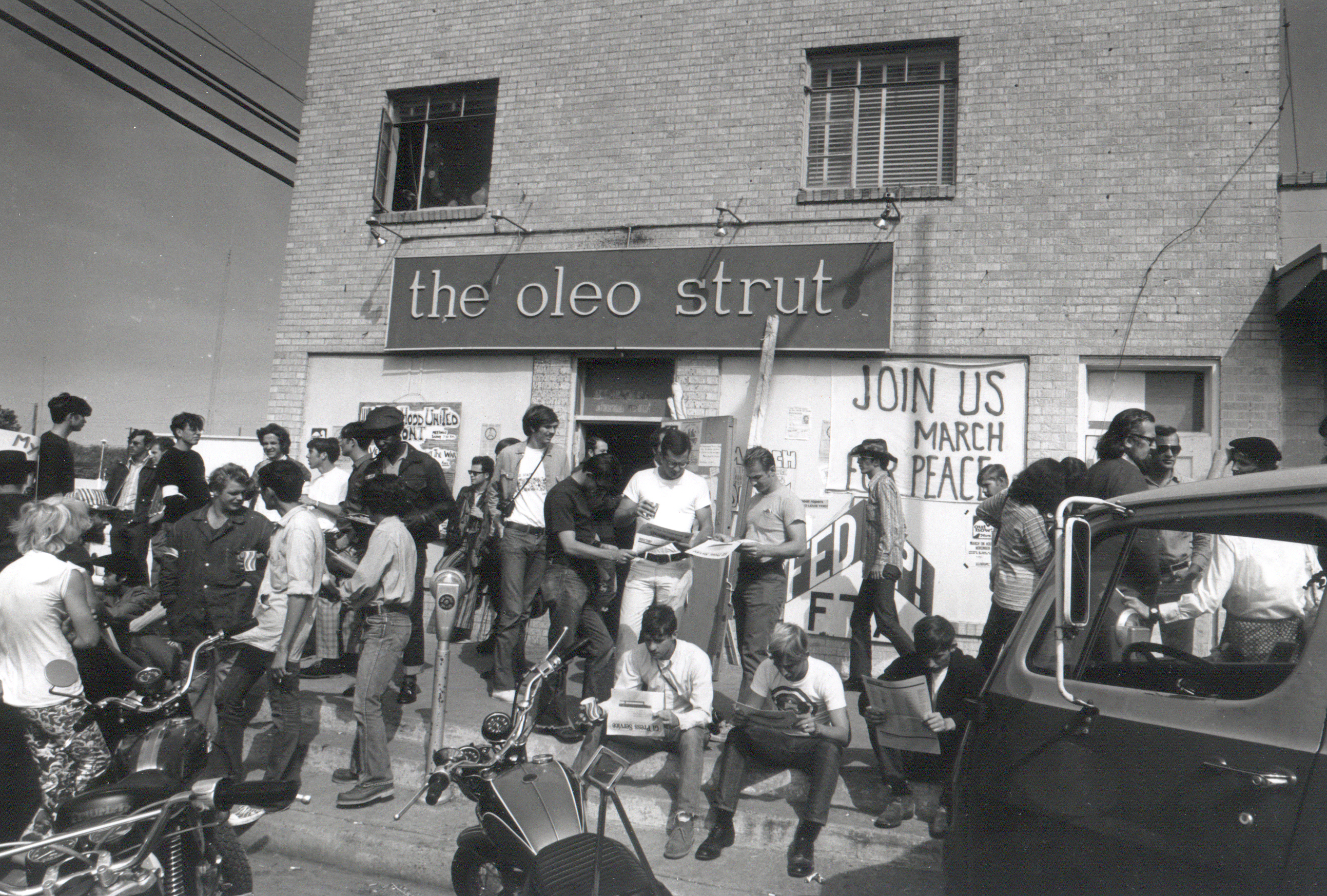
The Oleo Strut antiwar GI coffeehouse in 1971 was supported by USSF. Photo by Alan Pogue

One of USSF's founding and ongoing objectives was to support GI coffeehouses near U.S. military bases. Although several of these were established before USSF's creation, the organization saw itself as responsible for supporting and strengthening this aspect of the overall GI movement. Their 1971 pamphlet The New Army listed almost thirty coffeehouses, movement centers, and local projects that had been created and were receiving USSF financial support. Over time, the coffeehouse model gave way to a broader conception which included a wider variety of other forms like bookstores, gathering centers, counseling offices, peace houses, and more, including coffeehouses. The February 1972 issue of the USSF newsletter About Face discussed the importance of these off-base gathering centers: "there is usually no place on base where more than four or five people can gather at one time without running the risk of being harassed by the military authorities." Moreover, there was no place on military bases and ships where GIs could see films, read books and newspapers, or hear speakers and entertainers that had not been pre-approved by the military. This same article described the growth of USSF's support from six projects in 1969 to over thirty in early 1972. USSF established a "loose blueprint for the overall direction and purpose" of these projects. This included "educating GIs about the war" and "bringing together GIs who are opposed or become opposed to the war and the brass and helping them form more cohesive political organizations". It also "stressed the importance of maintaining a youth-oriented, alternative culture", a counterculture atmosphere. However, as the network of projects expanded, the USSF's "role in day-to-day operations was minimal"; it mainly provided financial and material support. Material support included entertainers, movies, projectors, typewriters, mimeograph machines, as well as radical books, magazines, and newspapers. The historian David Parsons argues that "USSF's support was vital" to the coffeehouse network, especially in its early years.

== GI underground newspapers ==
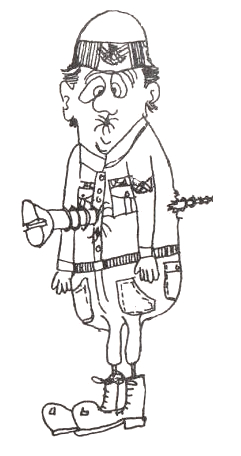
The Screwed GI, a favorite cartoon in GI underground newspapers

Another activity USSF considered vitally important and worthy of support was the creation of underground newspapers by and for GIs. Given the restrictions inherent in military life, the creation of an underground press was seen as essential for GIs to speak their minds and spread the word. The first issue of About Face, published in May 1971, observed that when USSF was first founded there were less than ten GI newspapers; this number had multiplied more than ten times to "well over a hundred." And USSF was proud to say they were giving financial support to about "half of these papers." These newspapers, along with the GI coffeehouses and other projects supported by USSF, "helped sustain a broad community of troop dissent and a civilian-GI antiwar alliance" during the peak years of the GI movement. The newspapers spread the word among GIs, "facilitated communication between individual projects", and gave activists and troops the sense that they were part of a broader GI movement". By the time the Vietnam War had ended there had been over 400 GI underground newspapers and newsletters produced by and for GIs at U.S. militaries bases throughout the world. While USSF did not finance or support most of these, there is no doubt it had a significant influence on their initiation and creation, especially in the earlier days of the GI movement.

== Organizing GI wives & WACs ==
During 1971 USSF began encouraging local projects to begin organizing GI wives and members of the Women's Army Corps or WACs. Perhaps the largest of these efforts was at Fort Bragg in North Carolina, one of the largest military installations in the world. In the August 1971 issue of the USSF G.I. News & Discussion Bulletin, the Fort Bragg Women's Project reported having a staff of eight women who were living "in one of the typical ghettos that military families are forced into." They described how they were trying to work within the community rather than through the local antiwar coffeehouse and that their focus was "to build a strong movement of GI wives against the military and against military aggression throughout the world." They condemned the Army's "blatant sexism" and "overt objectification" towards women and dependents and expressed their opinion that most of the women in Army towns could become a "force against the Army." Another effort was at Fort McClellan in Anniston, Alabama, which at that time was the headquarters of the WAC. This was a smaller group but they put out one issue of a WAC directed newsletter called Whack!. They also made some unsuccessful efforts to reach out to lesbian WACs who would have faced severe repercussions if their sexuality was discovered by the Army. By early 1972, with the overall GI movement beginning to wind down, these efforts seem to have been abandoned.

== Publications ==
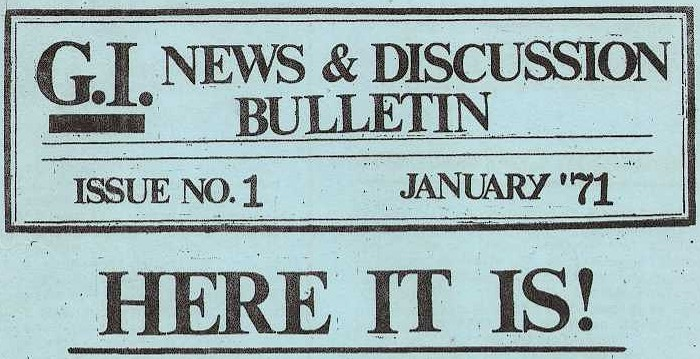
G.I. News & Discussion Bulletin first issue cover January 1971

In addition to supporting the publication of numerous GI underground publications, USSF put our several of its own newsletters. Its main external publication was About face! - The U.S. Servicemen's Fund Newsletter which came out for thirteen issues from May 1971 to June 1973 (see cover image above). Directed at the overall antiwar and GI movement and beyond, it was intended to spread the word about the GI movement and encourage civilians and GIs to get more involved and support its growth. USSF also produced the G.I. News & Discussion Bulletin, which was intended mainly for internal use. It was sent to all USSF and SOS projects to keep them informed about GI movement activity. Each project was encouraged to send in reports and articles. On the West Coast there were three additional publications, SOS News (LA) from Los Angeles that put out thirteen issues between January 1972 and February 1973, SOS News (SF) from Oakland and San Francisco that put out six issues in 1971, and the Coffeehouse News, also from the San Francisco Bay Area, which put out one issue in February 1969.

== Tax exempt status revoked and reinstated ==
Shortly after its founding, USSF filed the necessary legal and tax papers to become incorporated as a nonprofit, nonstock corporation on January 6, 1969, and as a tax exempt organization under section 501(c)(3) of the Internal Revenue Service Code on March 25, 1969. It stated its purposes were charitable, educational and scientific, "to provide recreational and educational services" for military personnel. It also described the "isolation, deprivation, and extraordinary sacrifice" of those in the military, while explaining USSF's plans to provide GIs with the educational and recreational opportunities already generally available to the broader population in the U.S. Service men and women would be provided with entertainment, books, newspapers and magazines. Despite the fact that USSF stuck to these principles, within a year of incorporation the IRS began to look into USSF's tax exempt status, likely one of several "organizations with a liberal or left orientation" recommended to the IRS for scrutiny by the Nixon administration. By June 1970, the IRS had started official revocation procedures. In January 1973, the district director of the Manhattan IRS office wrote that after "careful review" they did not think USSF met the definition of "educational" as set for by income tax regulations and rulings. Further, he argued, its expenditures "for the purpose of providing recreation and entertainment to servicemen" were not adequately monitored. He recommended their tax exempt status be revoked retroactively from inception, which officially occurred in February.

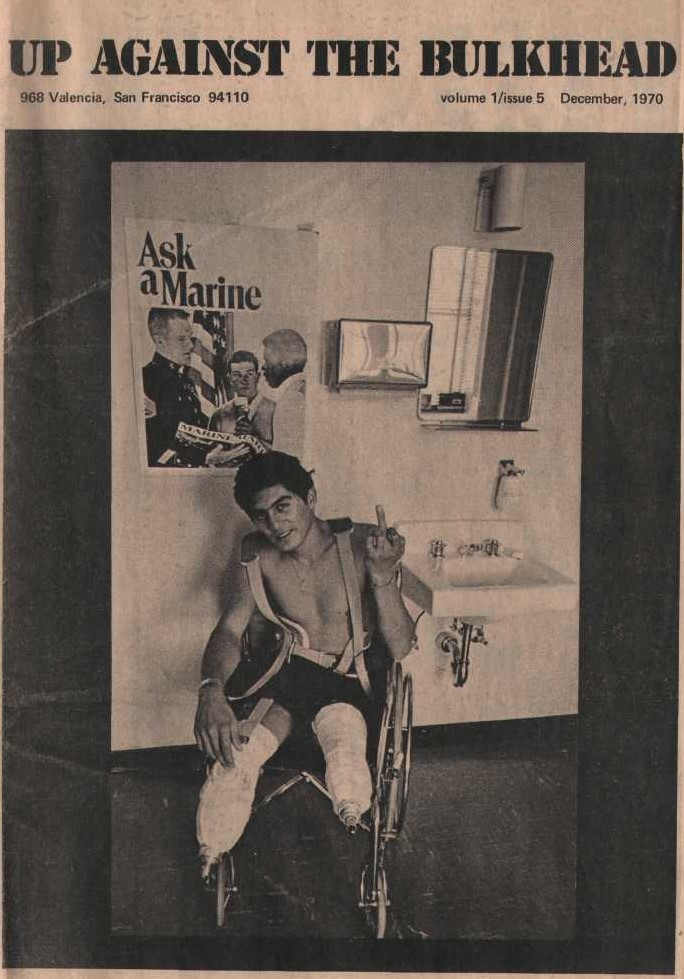
USSF funded newspaper Up Against the Bulkhead

The Center for Constitutional Rights, a non-profit legal advocacy organization focused on civil liberties, mounted a fierce defense of USSF. It argued among other things that the IRS was attempting to "silence expressions of dissent within the military" and "punish and destroy an organization" which supports "vigorous and colorful expression[s] of First Amendment rights", as well as "[c]hill and deter other tax exempt organizations from engaging in First Amendment activities at odds with government policies". The USSF responded publicly in About Face saying it provided GIs "only a forum; it is the men and women of the military who control and determine the point of view. If they voice dissent and disaffection, we ask that the administration look to itself for the causes."

By mid-1973 the IRS had backed down, dropping its revocation procedure, although according to Lauter it continued to audit the tax returns of USSF staff members, including his own. Overall USSF was careful to avoid violating the parameters of their tax exempt status. For example, this was one reason the West Coast offices of USSF kept using the SOS name. As the Oakland office explained it in a 1971 issue of SOS News, "USSF can only contribute to educational activities (i.e. newspapers, films, etc.). They cannot finance 'political' activities, such as demonstrations or staff expenses." SOS, then, would cover the expenses for more political events like Armed Forces Day demonstrations around the country, which they often called "Armed Farces Day" demonstrations.

== Other Harassment ==
USSF and many of the projects and newspapers it supported were often the object of other, sometimes severe, forms of harassment. Lauter, in a letter written to the New York Times, revealed that in March 1971 USSF files had been stolen containing confidential information about the organization's contributors and expenses. He said these "stolen records were then printed in a report of the House Internal Security Committee" while donors and grant recipients were also visited and harassed by the FBI. No official explanation was ever given about how U.S. government agencies obtained this stolen information. The UFO antiwar coffeehouse in Columbia, South Carolina, which was the first of its kind and helped USSF get established, had its doors chained shut and its staff arrested by the local police after only a year of operation. At trial, it was fined $10,000 (more than $70,000 today) for "operating and maintaining a public nuisance" and three UFO staff members were sentenced to six years in prison each. City leaders weren't just angry at the antiwar activities, prior to the arrests they made it clear that they were not comfortable with the counterculture atmosphere and interracial gatherings at the UFO. Violence was often directed at coffeehouses and other USSF projects. Seidman states that most coffeehouses had their windows smashed, many repeatedly. He chronicles "Gun shots, fire-bombs and grenades directed toward coffeehouses and their staffers." On April 29, 1970, the Green Machine coffeehouse near the Camp Pendleton Marine Corps base was shot up with 45 caliber machine gun fire, wounding one of the marines inside in the shoulder. Dr. Levy told the Los Angeles Free Press there was "an enormous amount of repression coming down on the GI movement and the civilians who support that movement." By way of comparison, he went on to say it was "exceeded only by the repression that's coming down on the Black Panthers.

== Eastland v. United States Servicemen's Fund ==
As mentioned above, the USSF was investigated by the House Committee on Internal Security (now abolished) for possible subversion of the U.S. military. While no subversion was uncovered, one long lasting result of that investigation developed around the subpoena by the Committee of USSF's banking records. The USSF challenged the subpoena and the resulting case, Eastland v. United States Servicemen's Fund, which made its way to the United States Supreme Court, resulted in a 1975 decision by that court that Congress was within its constitutional powers to issue a subpoena for these records. This case was in the news during the presidency of Donald Trump as it was cited as a precedent in the court cases involving the Tax returns of Donald Trump.

== Legacy ==
By the time USSF began to close its doors in late 1973, it had given significant support to the GI antiwar and resistance movements of the late 1960s and early 1970 within the U.S. military. The historian Derek Seidman has called USSF "the broadest and most enduring effort to sustain and expand soldier dissent." In addition to providing logistical and financial support, it helped offer "a coherent narrative and sense of unity for troop dissent and embedded the existence of 'the GI movement' into the public consciousness." It also helped create an alliance between the broad civilian antiwar efforts and the troops who were questioning and resisting the war and the military. Historian Richard Moser has argued that USSF "enabled an international network of soldiers and veterans to pursue antiwar work among GIs." David L. Parsons, the author of Dangerous Grounds, the only existing non-fiction book to date about the GI coffeehouse movement, says USSF "spent millions of dollars over a period of six years" supporting various GI antiwar and anti-military projects (one million dollars in 1970 would be worth close to eight million today). Lauter spoke to how USSF projects helped GIs get "a taste of their own political power", and "perhaps most importantly [learn] a different kind of solidarity from the battlefield". He felt that "new kind of solidarity gave meaning to the phrase 'GI antiwar movement.'" Much of this history has been obscured with time, and even covered over with myths like that of Vietnam GIs being spit on by antiwar activists as they returned to the U.S. (for more on this see Myth of the spat-on Vietnam veteran and The Spitting Image).

== See also ==
- Concerned Officers Movement
- Court-martial of Howard Levy
- Court-martial of Susan Schnall
- Donald W. Duncan, Master Sergeant U.S. Army Special Forces early register to the Vietnam War
- FTA Show - 1971 anti-Vietnam War road show for GIs
- F.T.A. - documentary film about the FTA Show
- Fort Hood Three
- GI's Against Fascism
- GI Coffeehouses
- GI Underground Press
- Movement for a Democratic Military
- Opposition to United States involvement in the Vietnam War
- Pacific Counseling Service
- Presidio mutiny
- Sir! No Sir!, a documentary about the anti-war movement within the ranks of the United States Armed Forces
- Stop Our Ship (SOS) anti-Vietnam War movement in and around the U.S. Navy
- The Spitting Image, a 1998 book by Vietnam veteran and sociology professor Jerry Lembcke which disproves the widely believed narrative that American soldiers were spat upon and insulted by antiwar protesters
- Vietnam Veterans Against the War
- Waging Peace in Vietnam
- Winter Soldier Investigation
