= Brent Staples =

American editorial writer

- Staples in 2019
- Born: September 13, 1951; Chester, Pennsylvania, U.S.
- Education: Penn Morton College (B.A.); University of Chicago (M.A.) and (Ph.D.)
- Occupations: The New York Times editorial writer, author

Brent Staples (born September, 13, 1951) is an American author and member of the editorial board of The New York Times, where he specializes in coverage of education, criminal justice and economics. His books include An American Love Story and Parallel Time: Growing up In Black and White. He writes about political, social and cultural issues, including race and the state of the American school system.

His memoir Parallel Time was a finalist for the Los Angeles Times Book Prize and winner of the Anisfield-Wolf Book Award. He won the 2019 Pulitzer Prize for Editorial Writing. He is a fellow of the Society of American Historians and a visiting fellow at several academic institutions.

== Early life and education ==
Staples was born September 13, 1951, in Chester, Pennsylvania, the oldest of nine children. His parents moved from rural Virginia to Chester as part of the Second Great Migration of Southern Blacks to urban centers in the North. His father was a truck driver and his mother a homemaker. By the time Staples was in the eighth grade, his family had moved within Chester seven times, often due to their inability to pay the rent. His family had no money for tuition; his grades were average, and he had taken only a few high-level academic courses in high school. The expectation was that he would go straight to work, most likely at one of the shipyards in Chester.

He was convinced to attend Widener University (then known as Penn Morton College) by the only African American professor at the school as part of a program named Project Prepare. He graduated from Widener University with a B.A. degree in 1973. He was awarded two doctoral fellowships from the Danforth Foundation and the Ford Foundation. Staples received a master's degree in psychology in 1976 and a Ph.D. in the discipline in 1982 from the University of Chicago.

In 2000, Staples received an honorary doctorate degree in humane letters from Mount Saint Mary College in Newburgh, New York.

== Career ==
Staples taught psychology at Widener University and various institutions in Chicago from 1977 to 1981, but began to pursue a separate career track in journalism. In 1983, he was hired as a science writer by the Chicago Sun-Times. In 1983, his younger brother, Blake, a cocaine dealer, was murdered by a client, which forced Staples to reconsider his own success and his inability to stop his brother's life choices. In 1985, Staples joined the staff of The New York Times as an editor of the Book Review and subsequently became assistant metropolitan editor. His essay "Just Walk on By: Black Men and Public Space", published in Ms. Magazine in 1986, was so influential that it soon became required reading in numerous college courses. In 1990, he was appointed to the newspaper's editorial board.

In 1994, his memoir, Parallel Time, was a finalist for the Los Angeles Times Book Prize and winner of the Anisfield-Wolf Book Award.

In a 1994 interview with Paul Galloway of the Chicago Tribune, Staples reflected: "Being Black enriches my experience; it doesn't define me .... I'm writing about universal themes – family and leaving home and developing your own identity – which all Americans can enjoy and understand." As a writer, he works to correct the myth that the American "Black experience" is defined only by poverty, violence, and crime. In the same interview, he stated: "I despise the expression ['Black experience']. There is no such thing. Black people's lives in this country are too varied to be reduced to a single term."

He has served as a visiting fellow at academic institutions including the Hoover Foundation, the University of Chicago and Yale University.

In 2019, Staples won the Pulitzer Prize for Editorial Writing. His editorials highlighted the history of racism in the United States and were described by the Pulitzer Prize committee as being "written with extraordinary moral clarity".

== Bibliography ==
- Just Walk on By: Black Men and Public Spaces, Ms. Magazine, 1986
- Parallel Time: Growing Up in Black and White, Pantheon Books, 1994, ISBN 0-679-42154-8
- An American Love Story, Random House, 1999, ISBN 0-375-50299-8
