= Myth of the spat-on Vietnam veteran =

Allegations of the spitting on Vietnam veterans

A G.I. Joe comic showing a classic example of an antiwar hippie spitting on a returning Vietnam vet.

There is a persistent myth or misconception that many Vietnam War veterans were spat on and vilified by antiwar protesters during the late 1960s and early 1970s. These stories, which overwhelmingly surfaced many years after the war, usually involve an antiwar female spitting on a veteran, often yelling "baby killer". Most occur in U.S. civilian airports, usually San Francisco International, as GIs returned from the war zone in their uniforms.

No unambiguous documented incident of this behavior has ever surfaced, despite repeated and concerted efforts to uncover them. The few dubious examples brought forward have been the object of much debate and controversy. Only 1 percent of Vietnam veterans themselves, according to a Veterans Administration-commissioned Harris Poll conducted in 1971, described their reception from friends and family as "not at all friendly", and only 3 percent described their reception from people their own age as "unfriendly". More, there is ample and well documented evidence of a mutually supportive, empathetic relationship between GIs, veterans and antiwar forces during the Vietnam War. Martin Luther King Jr. spoke to this in his April 1967 speech, "Beyond Vietnam: A Time to Break Silence", when he chastised "those who are seeking to make it appear that anyone who opposes the war in Vietnam is a fool or a traitor or an enemy of our soldiers".

== Origins ==
The origins of the spitting myth have been the topic of much scholarly investigation and public debate over the years. There are three general categories of these investigations and exchanges which often interpenetrate but generally fall into: 1) scholarly studies published in academic journals and one book, 2) finding and evaluating old press reports, and 3) Vietnam veteran anecdotal stories.

=== Studies ===
There have been numerous studies of returning Vietnam veterans, a number of which have attempted to pinpoint the origins of the perception that the anti-Vietnam War movement was anti-troop or spat on veterans. Notably in this context, the earliest studies and polls related to Vietnam veterans don't even have this issue on their radar. The 1971 Harris Poll mentioned above, which found that only 1 percent of veterans perceived an unfriendly reception from friends and family, also interviewed a cross section of households and employers and summarized their findings saying, "The public and prospective employers clearly feel that veterans are deserving of the same respect and the warm reception accorded to returning veterans of previous wars." In 1974 the Committee on Veterans Affairs of the U.S. Senate gathered together almost 1,000 pages of "Source Material on the Vietnam Era Veteran." Not one source in this large volume mentions antiwar forces spitting on veterans. A 1975 academic study of Vietnam veteran "Adjustment Patterns and Attitudes" asked no questions about treatment by antiwar forces or being spat on. What this study did reveal, however, was that participation in the war significantly changed the men's attitudes—whereas 67% of them were for the war prior to entering the military, 75% came back against it. So, not only has no evidence been uncovered by scholars of "I was spit on" stories, during the war period, or shortly after, but "there is no evidence that anyone at the time thought they were occurring", or felt it needed to be investigated.

==== Academic papers ====
It was not until over a decade after the war that spat-upon veteran stories began to appear in movies, the media and anecdotally from veterans, and even longer before it surfaced as an academic question to be studied. A 1995 study by three prominent sociologists (Thomas D. Beamish, Harvey Molotch and Richard Flacks), who carefully examined "press accounts of protests between 1965-1971", concluded that media reports showing the antiwar movement "directly or purposely" targeting troops "are virtually nonexistent." They did, however, find frequent instances of government officials and military leaders falsely labeling the antiwar movement as anti-troop, which they present as one source of the later developing myth. A 2004 study situated the myth's origins in the early efforts by President Johnson's administration to portray antiwar demonstrations as anti-troop, including the staging of a counter demonstration to 'Support Our Boys in Vietnam' parade in New York City" on May 13, 1967. By the end of 1969, according to this study, government officials and politicians were becoming "more shrill", with the New York City mayoral candidate accusing the then Mayor, John Lindsay, who was an opponent of the war, of having "planted a dagger in the back of American servicemen in Vietnam." Then California Governor Ronald Reagan took it even further by saying that the November 1969 antiwar Moratorium would cause some Americans to "die tonight because of the activity in our streets."

==== Jerry Lembcke ====
The most extensive and comprehensive study of this phenomenon, The Spitting Image: Myth, Memory, and the Legacy of Vietnam, written by sociology professor and Vietnam veteran Jerry Lembcke, situates the origins in "Nixon's haranguing of war protesters for their disloyalty to the troops." Lembcke shows how the Bush administration and American media used support for the soldiers as a primary motivator to rally the country to support the Gulf War in 1990–91. A prominent part of this was the yellow ribbon campaigns and the image of the "spat-upon Vietnam veteran", with newspapers like The New York Times quoting a soldier saying "if I go back home like the Vietnam vets did and somebody spits on me, I swear to God I'll kill them." According to Lembcke, "it was the image of the spat-upon Vietnam veteran that figured most prominently in the rhetoric of those supporting the Gulf War.

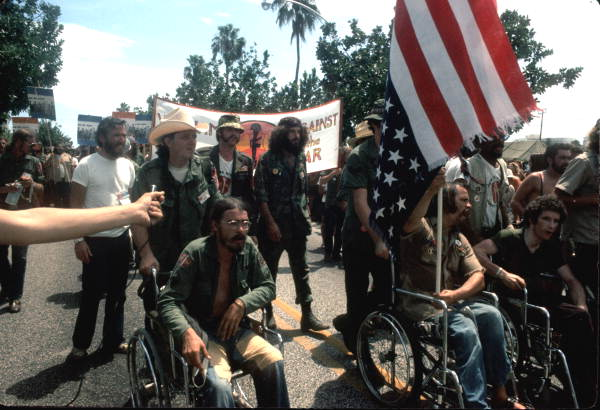
Ron Kovic and Vietnam veteran protestors at the 1972 Republican National Convention in Miami. Kovic says he was spit on by a pro-war Nixon supporter.

He also points out that during the Vietnam War years there were several newspaper accounts of pro-war demonstrators spitting on anti-war demonstrators, and suggests that these oral accounts could easily have been reinterpreted and inverted and made into stories about activists spitting on veterans. Perhaps one of the most well known of these spitting incidents was directed at anti-war activist and ex-Marine, Ron Kovic, who was wounded and paralyzed in the Vietnam War. At the 1972 Republican National Convention he and two other wounded vets shouted "Stop the bombing!" as Nixon accepted the nomination for president, and were promptly spat on by a man wearing a Four More Years button.

Lembcke also traces the myth's development through film and the media over the years. He identified and viewed "approximately 120 films portraying relations between Vietnam veterans and the anti-war movement", and reveals that from the "late 1970s on, Hollywood produce[d] more and more films portraying anti-war movement hostility toward soldiers and veterans." The movie Tracks, in 1977, "contains the first clear inference that anti-war activists spat on Vietnam veterans."

Perhaps Lembcke's most important contribution to this debate, however, has been to situate the "spitting image" within its historical context. Acknowledging that it's difficult to prove innocence, to show that something did not happen, he examines the era and shows "that the anti-war movement was supportive of Vietnam veterans and that, in turn, many veterans joined the opposition to the war." Given that, he argues, "it is highly unlikely that that same movement could have simultaneously been acting in a hostile fashion toward Vietnam veterans." He has also extensively investigated media from the war period, as well as several hundred anecdotal veteran stories of being spit on (more on this below). He may also be the only scholar to dig into police reports and court records in search of arrest or trial accounts, pointing out that anyone today spitting on political or religious groups would certainly be arrested. He found "not a hint of hostility between anti-war activists and military personal or veterans" in these records.

Lembcke acknowledges that he cannot prove the negative—that no Vietnam veteran was ever spat on—saying it is hard to imagine there not being expressions of hostility between veterans and activists:

I cannot, of course, prove to anyone's satisfaction that spitting incidents like these did not happen. Indeed, it seems likely to me that it probably did happen to some veteran, some time, some place. But while I cannot prove the negative, I can prove the positive: I can show what did happen during those years and that that historical record makes it highly unlikely that the alleged acts of spitting occurred in the number and manner that is now widely believed.

==== Other ====
In 1992, the Director of the Connelly Library and curator of the Vietnam War Collection at LaSalle University listed the spitting myth as one of six "legends" from the Vietnam era, and observed it "derives from the mythopoeic belief that returning GIs were routinely spat upon at some time during their repatriation to the USA. This particular round of tales has become so commonplace as to be treated reverently even among otherwise wisely observant veterans." In 1994, scholar Paul Rogat Loeb wrote, "to consider spitting on soldiers as even remotely representative of the activist response is to validate a lie", and noted that myths like that of antiwar activists spitting on soldiers have rewritten or "erased history". Clarence Page, the well known journalist, Vietnam veteran and member of the Chicago Tribune editorial board interviewed Lembcke and Bob Greene, who published a book of veterans' anecdotal stories (see below), and observed, "the stories have become so widely believed, despite a remarkable lack of witnesses or evidence, that ironically the burden of proof now falls on the accused, the protesters; not their accusers, the veterans. Antiwar protesters must prove the episodes didn't happen, instead of the veterans having to prove they did."

All of the academic sources who have studied the origins of the spitting myth agree that it was the pro-Vietnam War and then pro-Gulf War forces which promoted and sustained a false narrative.

=== Press reports ===
Several academic studies and some individuals have searched extensively for media stories of spitting incidents reported during the war or around that time period. All the academic studies have come away essentially empty handed, with no verifiable contemporaneous story matching the basic theme of an antiwar protester spitting on a Vietnam veteran. In 2007, Northwestern Law School professor and libertarian blogger James Lindgren claimed to have uncovered "[m]any 1967-72" spitting incidents in the press, and was critical of Lembcke's and others' research. Others, however, critiqued Lindgren's methods and pointed out that he had included a number of unrelated spitting incidents into his list of "many", seriously undermining his claim. For example, he cited as a prominent example press coverage of two sailors who were spit on and attacked with a knife by a group of men who were not identified as antiwar or even political. He also included reports of World War II and First World War veterans being spit on, plus reports of spitting on police and flags. Lembcke wrote an 18-point response to Lindgren's list of reported incidents which was linked in an article in the online magazine Slate. He felt two or three of the incidents were of interest and worth looking into, but maintained his larger thesis that a few possible incidents don't make the overall myth true. Especially since there is ample historical evidence and documentation of friendly relations between antiwar forces and veterans. Jack Shafer, writing for Slate, examined these back and forth exchanges and concluded that "Lindgren has failed so far to produce a contemporaneous news account—or other corroborative evidence—of a protester ambushing a returning veteran with a gob of spit, which I take as the main point of Lembcke's book".

Shafer, however, continued to dig into this story and a month later became convinced that he had uncovered one likely and credible CBS news report from December 27, 1971, where Vietnam veteran Delmar Pickett Jr. tells of being spit on at the Seattle airport. Picket told CBS, "these two dudes walked up—one of them spit at me." Shafer contacted Pickett by phone and confirmed the essence of the story with minor differences. Pickett said he was discharged from the Army at Fort Lewis, Washington in April 1971 but wore his uniform to the airport. He said he and four other GIs in uniform passed by four young men at the airport. One of them, who according to Picket was about 19 and had long hair and a "shabby T-shirt, said something to the GIs—something about 'killers'—and then spat, missing Pickett." This story still fails to make the case because the men at the airport were not identified as antiwar protesters or demonstrators.

One press story uncovered by Lindgren comes the closest to fitting the complete image portrayed by the classic spitting story—an antiwar protester spitting on a Vietnam veteran or GI. According to a front-page story in The New York Times, a "small number" of militant antiwar demonstrators, among a larger group of around 50,000 at the March on the Pentagon on October 21, 1967, "spat on some of the soldiers in the front line at the Pentagon and goaded them with the most vicious personal slander." It was not reported whether any of these soldiers were Vietnam veterans, although even as early in the war as 1967, it's possible. But, how likely is it potential spitters would be questioning soldiers about their war time experience. It is more likely any spitting that occurred was related more to tense confrontations that took place between a small group of demonstrators and troops as a few protesters tried to enter the Pentagon and were met with tear gas, bayonets and rifle butts.

In his 2009 book War Stories, historian and Vietnam veteran Gary Kulik devoted a chapter to the myth of "Spit-Upon Veterans". He also criticized Lindgren's research, "Lindgren's evidence includes only one single first-person ("I was spit upon") account—the stories that are at the heart of Lembcke's book—and it appears that none of the accounts he cites were actually witnessed by a reporter. Moreover, Lindgren does not cite a single case of a Vietnam veteran spit upon as he returned home, and that was the story that would ultimately be repeated and believed." Kulik concluded that the spitting stories were formulaic and unbelievable, and were propagated to serve the political goals of those who wished to vilify the anti-war movement. "The image of 'hippie' men and women hawking up gobs of phlegm to hurl at the ribbons of veterans, as a pervasive and commonplace act, is surely false."

After all the investigation and debate, there is scant published media evidence of antiwar protesters spitting on vets or GIs. Even with one or a few possible incidents somewhat like the myth, there is not sufficient confirmation to substantiate it as an accurate portrayal of the overall relationship between the antiwar movement and returning Vietnam veterans, much less maintain it as a powerful and accepted truth over decades.

=== Anecdotal stories ===
The most prevalent and oft cited sources used currently to defend the spitting myth are anecdotal stories told by people claiming to be Vietnam veterans who say they were spat on. These personal narratives have surfaced over the years since the war, almost all appearing many years later. Several scholars who have examined these have pointed out that spitting incidents were essentially non-existent in early interviews, polls or memoirs. Kulik reviewed all of "the most popular early memoirs", "reportage" and "oral histories" by Vietnam veterans, including: Tim O'Brien's If I Die in a Combat Zone (1973), Ron Kovic's Born on the Fourth of July (1983), Robert Mason's Chickenhawk (1983), John Sack's M (1967), Michael Herr's Dispatches (1977), Al Santoli's Everything We Had (1981), Wallace Terry's Bloods (1984) and Mark Baker's Nam (1981). He said none of them contained "any mention of returning veterans being spit upon". Specialist in civil-military relations and advisor to the National Institute of Military Justice, Diane Mazur, also looked closely into this subject and concluded: "There is no contemporaneous evidence that Americans who opposed the war expressed those beliefs by spitting on or otherwise assaulting returning Vietnam Veterans." More, she said, "The idea...that spitting on or mistreating Vietnam veterans was in any way typical or representative of anything in that era is completely false." Lembcke wrote, that almost all reports by Vietnam veterans themselves "came years after the incidents were alleged to have occurred, while in the actual time frame in which men came home from Vietnam there are no such reports."

The anecdotal stories have been collected in a book, appeared in letters to the editor, news articles, and online blogs.

==== The book of stories ====
Homecoming: When the Soldiers Returned from Vietnam, a 1989 book by Bob Greene, has the most extensive public collection of stories, with 60 veterans claiming they were spat on, 68 saying it never happened to them, and 19 more recalling "only acts of kindness". For Greene, the stories revealed "jarring truths" and proved "that American civilians actually did spit upon returning American soldiers." Other experts on this topic, however, have been sharply critical of his methods and conclusions. One large issue was verifiability. Greene's admission that he couldn't be sure the veterans' letters were "real" did not inspire confidence—he had found a "source in the Veterans Administration" who checked out "a limited number of names".

Kulik noted the contradictory nature of the stories in Greene's book and concluded that Greene arrogantly dismissed the "surprising number" of veterans who "refuse to believe" the spitting stories. He concluded, "Greene was not just incredulous, but negligently irresponsible." Lembcke was critical of Greene's survey methodology and pointed out that he asked a "leading question: 'Were you spat upon?' Had he asked a more neutral question such as, 'What were your homecoming experiences?' the veterans' responses would be much more valid." He also noted, as have others examining these stories, that "many of Greene's spat-upon veterans claimed the spitter was a girl or a woman," which flies in the face of the cultural and social norm that women and girls generally don't spit publicly. Lembcke quoted a "psychologist friend...who works in women's studies", "It's gotta be a myth, girls don't spit." Krulik said, "how many of us can recall even seeing a woman spit in public, for any reason, in this period?" And also critiqued Greene's method, saying "It was not a question that would qualify as a good oral-history technique," noting Greene had presented a sample incident "in a way that could only elicit predictable responses" by posing a possible story of a returning soldier at an airport being "spat upon by hippies." He then received back many similar stories. Kulik also observed that, "Even the stories that are not obviously false contain clear warning signs. The vast majority of them cannot be corroborated. There are no named witnesses, none. You would think that at least one of these stories would involve two or more veterans who were friends and who could be remembered and named." He even described his own 1968 discharge from the Marines and the transition from the base to a civilian airport, saying it was "not a one at a time activity". No GI would have been alone at West Coast civilian airports "at the mercy of vicious 'flower children' or spitting waitresses and grandmothers."

==== Online stories ====
In February 2007, Jack Shafer, writing in Slate, appealed to anyone who could "point me to a documented case of a returning Viet vet getting spat upon". He received 62 postings from people claiming to be Vietnam veterans, 39 of whom said it happened to them, while 19 others reported witnessing spitting incidents. Shafer observed that many of the "spit assaults" supposedly took place at San Francisco Airport and yet none resulted in a cop or reporter being called after a fistfight. He also asked, "Why does it always end with the protester spitting and the serviceman walking off in shame? Most servicemen would have given the spitters a mouthful of bloody Chiclets instead of turning the other cheek like Christ. At the very least, wouldn't the altercations have resulted in assault and battery charges and produced a paper trail retrievable across the decades?" Lembcke followed, and even weighed into the online debate that ensued. He called it "the largest single data set we have for the study of the spitting stories" since Greene's book. He again observed "exaggeration and clichés" with gender and sexual themes. He pointed out, for example, stories of multiple spittings, including one veteran's claim of being spat on "two and three times per day" at Colorado State University. Many of the spitters were also "female or male hippies", as in one story about a group of GIs who had to be "escorted through the San Francisco airport by cops" as a mob of "long hairs" threw "bags of feces on us, eggs, & other trash at us." Among the group of "long hairs" was a filthy girl holding a dog in an American flag while giving it a "blow job." Again, no credible, documented or documentable cases emerged, and no attempt to verify whether the responses were from actual Vietnam veterans.

==== Tracking the stories ====
Lembcke has been tracking and attempting to verify the emerging anecdotal stories and in 2017 wrote in The New York Times that he had "a spreadsheet with about 220 first-person 'I was spat on' accounts." "These stories have to be taken very seriously", he says, "but as historical evidence they are problematic." In addition to the long delay before their appearance and lack of contemporary evidence, many of the stories contain exaggerations and "implausible details, like returning soldiers deplaning at San Francisco Airport, where they were met by groups of spitting hippies." One of the earliest stories of this kind was quoted in Time magazine in April 1979: Alan Fitzgerald, who was in Vietnam in 1970 said, "When I came back and landed at San Francisco airport with 200 others, we were spit on and kicked at." As Lembcke and others have documented, however, return flights from Vietnam didn't land at civilian airports like San Francisco, but at military bases such as Travis Air Force Base, which would have barred civilian protesters. Once landed and processed through at a military base, GIs heading home on leave or discharged could then end up in civilian airports, usually with a few buddies, some still in uniform, but there never would have been 200 uniformed GI landing at and walking together through a civilian airport. And the idea of a small group of demonstrators fearlessly spitting at and kicking 200 GIs, with none of the soldiers responding, strains credulity. Lembcke's favorite example of implausibility was published in his local paper, the Worcester, Massachusetts Telegram and Gazette: "In a November 11, 1998 Veterans Day story, James Collins claimed his plane from Vietnam was met at Clark Airforce Base north of San Francisco by 'thousands of protesters throwing Molotov cocktails.' Like many of the stories, Collins' had details that were factually wrong (e.g. There is no Clark Airforce Base in the Bay Area) or too implausible to be believed." Lembcke is also critical of the journalistic ethics involved in printing such stories.

==== Karl Marlantes ====
Vietnam veteran Karl Marlantes first wrote about his reception upon coming home in his biographical non-fiction book, What It Is Like to Go to War, published in 2011. He described being jeered and called names by antiwar protesters while walking the streets of Washington, DC in his uniform. He also told of being on a train in his uniform when "a nice-looking woman" came down the aisle: "She was looking right at me, lips pressed tight. She stood in front of me and spit on me." He was also interviewed for the Ken Burns and Lynn Novick 2017 PBS documentary, The Vietnam War, where he talked about being heckled by antiwar protestors as he exited Travis Air Force Base after returning from Vietnam. Others who have viewed the documentary have commented that "the footage from the scene shows a protest sign that read: 'Active Duty GIs Against the War' and a vest worn by a veteran with the same slogan." This was a common sight outside Travis during the war as there were active GI and veteran antiwar groups organizing there from 1969 to 1973. Historian Jeremy Kuzmarov wondered, "If many of the people protesting were veterans, perhaps they were shouting at Marlantes to join them. It is unlikely that active duty soldiers would berate one of their own or tolerate others doing so." In his book, Marlantes concedes the "frequency of spitting incidents is a raging controversy." And says, "I think the number was very small. None of my friends experienced it. The image of being spit on, however, became a metaphor for what happened to returning Vietnam veterans. I think that this is what fuels the belief that spitting was a more common occurrence than it was, in reality." As with almost all the stories of this type, his surfaced many years after the war. In Lembcke's review of the Burns/Novick documentary, he points out that Vietnam War scholars were intentionally excluded in favor of the view of the war from ordinary people. He continues, "Ground-up views are susceptible, especially after 40 years, to the very myths they are supposed to belie. Memories that are 40 years old are too influenced by movies, novels, newspapers, and television". He called Marlantes memories "betrayal fantasies".

==== An antiwar activist in the San Francisco airport ====
Steve Rees, an antiwar activist and photographer who organized GIs in the San Francisco Bay Area and frequently sold copies of the GI underground newspaper Up Against the Bulkhead at San Francisco International Airport, might seem a likely candidate to have participated in a spitting incident or perhaps to have seen one of the many supposedly occurring there. He told his story in They Should Have Served that Cup of Coffee: Seven Radicals Remember the '60s, a collection of essays by Vietnam era activists published in 1999. As Rees described it, when they approached returning soldiers, "We were sometimes the first civilians they saw.... We were generally something of a surprise". They might have heard "on Armed Forces Radio that the folks back home weren't duly appreciative of the job they were doing, many GIs came in from Vietnam thinking mobs of antiwar militants would be waiting to spit on them." As a result, "many were naturally a bit uneasy" because "we were the first long-hairs to walk right up and talk with them". As Rees remembered it, "Four out of five took the paper." And, "not one of them ever swung on us, railed at us called us traitors, or any of it." He described no spitting incidents, either way. The Bulkhead newspaper would publish many letters from GIs, often expressing agreement, not hostility, towards the antiwar movement. Here's one example: "The peace demonstrations the beginning of this month were very encouraging to most of us in Viet Nam. It's a relief to at least know that the people cannot be bullshitted by the government. Please, keep it up. Mac, 584th Eng Co (LE) 25 November 1971."

== See also ==
- Homecoming: When the Soldiers Returned from Vietnam
- GI Coffeehouses
- GI Underground Press
- Sir! No Sir!, film about the soldier and sailor resistance during the Vietnam War
- Soldiers in Revolt: GI Resistance During the Vietnam War, book about soldier and sailor resistance during the Vietnam War
- Vietnam stab-in-the-back myth
- Vietnam Veterans Against the War
