= Homecoming King (disambiguation) =

A Homecoming King is a ceremonial role in student homecoming rallies.

Homecoming King may also refer to:

- Hasan Minhaj: Homecoming King, 2017 comedy film
- "Homecoming King", song from the Guster album Keep It Together

== See also ==
- Homecoming Queen (disambiguation)
- Homecoming (disambiguation)
