= Homecoming Queen (disambiguation) =

A Homecoming Queen is a ceremonial role in student homecoming rallies.

Homecoming Queen may also refer to:

== Music ==
- "Homecoming Queen" (Hinder song), a song by Hinder from the 2007 album Extreme Behavior
- Homecoming Queen (Thelma Plum song), 2019
- "Homecoming Queen?", a 2019 song by Kelsea Ballerini
- "Homecoming Queen", a song by Sheryl Crow from Feels like Home
- "Homecoming Queen", a song by Sparklehorse

== Other uses ==
- Homecoming Queen (horse), an Irish Thoroughbred racehorse
- Homecoming Queen (TV series)

== See also ==
- Homecoming King (disambiguation)
- Homecoming (disambiguation)
- "The Homecoming Queen's Got a Gun", 1983 song by Julie Brown
