= Joshua (2002 film) =

- Theatrical release poster
- Directed by: Jon Purdy
- Screenplay by: Brad Mirman; Keith Giglio
- Starring: Tony Goldwyn; F. Murray Abraham; Giancarlo Giannini
- Cinematography: Bruce Surtees
- Edited by: Richard Nord
- Music by: Michael W. Smith
- Production companies: Epiphany Films; Crusader Entertainment; Feelmax
- Distributed by: Artisan Entertainment
- Release date: 19 April 2002
- Running time: 91 minutes
- Country: United States
- Language: English

Joshua is a 2002 American drama film directed by Jon Purdy, based on Joseph F. Girzone's novel of the same name, and starring Tony Goldwyn in a leading role. It was distributed by Artisan Entertainment.

== Plot ==
Joshua is a mysterious man appearing in a small town named Auburn He changes the lives of everyone he meets, simply by being around them.

Joshua takes up residence in a barn that he rents from Joan Casey to use as his home and woodcarving shop. To the surprise of a local priest, the roof does not leak after Joshua moves in, despite the many holes in it.

The more time Joshua spends in town, the more attention he draws to himself simply by doing what he does. He begins by rebuilding the Baptist Church which was destroyed during a storm the year before. He gets the attention of many locals by carrying a huge log of ash through town and out to his barn, some estimates range that it weighs at least 300 pounds.

Later, Father Tordone of the local Catholic church hires him to carve a statue of the Apostle Peter, to which Joshua responds that it should be made of ash and that he knows "Peter".

Joshua spends his next few weeks helping out anyone he meets, who in return help him rebuild the Baptist Church. He intervenes in a Tent Revival, where a con artist is tricking people into believing that he is healing people through the power of God. Joshua tells him, "You don't have to do it this way", and proceeds to restore sight to a blind woman sitting in the audience.

Father Tordone becomes very suspicious of Joshua's behavior and motives, and tries to convince the Vatican to step in and stop him before he gains more followers and creates his own cult. It is not until Joshua resurrects a man from the dead that the Catholic Church takes interest in him and invites him to Rome.

== Cast ==
- Tony Goldwyn as Joshua / Jesus
- F. Murray Abraham as Father Tordone
- Kurt Fuller as Father Pat Hayes
- Stacy Edwards as Maggie
- Giancarlo Giannini as The Pope
- Eddie Bo Smith Jr. as Theo
- Michael Guido as Aaron
- Matt Zeigler as Kevin
- Colleen Camp as Joan Casey
- Marc Grapey as Steve Casey
- Rich Komenich as Ray Persini
- Dale Calandra as Leo Persini
- Cedric Young as Charlie
- Tim Grimm as Bishop Anderson
- Jordan Allen as Michael
- James Meeks as Monroe
- Tim Decker as Reverend Daily

The Christian band Third Day also appears in a concert.

== Music ==
The soundtrack includes music by Michael W. Smith, Jaci Velasquez, Mark Schultz, Point of Grace, and Third Day. Third Day makes an appearance in the film at a concert where they play "Come Together".

== Reception and box office ==
Released April 19, 2002, the film went on to garner $1,461,635 during its run. It had its widest release in 43 theaters. Produced on an estimated budget of $9,000,000, the film lost over $7,000,000 and qualified as a box-office bomb as a result.
