= Medic (TV series) =

American TV medical drama (1954–1956)

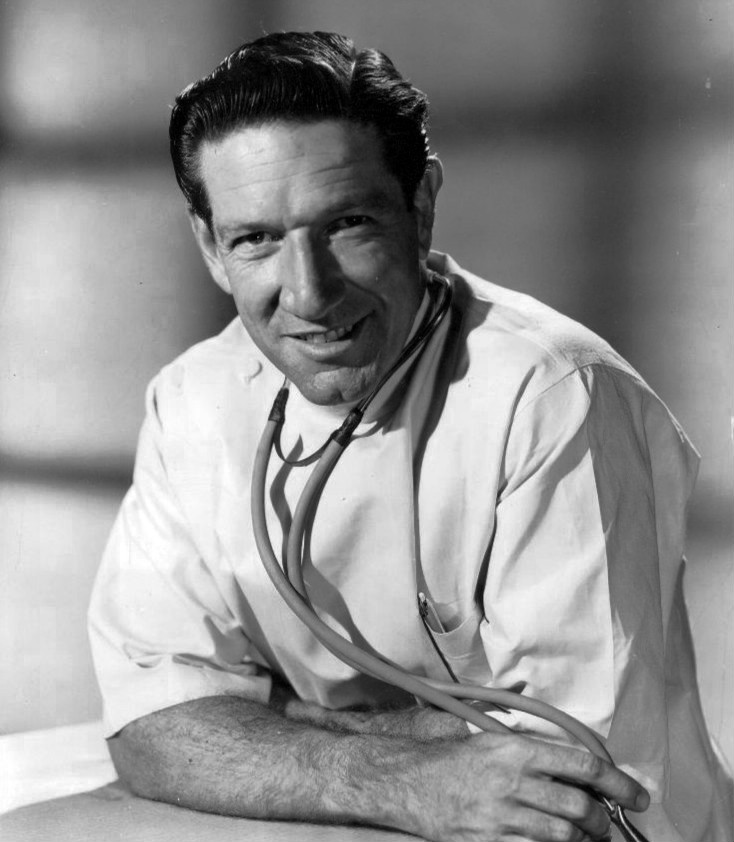
- Richard Boone as Konrad Styner, 1955.
- Genre: Medical drama
- Created by: James E. Moser
- Directed by: John Brahm; George M. Cahan; Bernard Girard; Worthington Miner; James E. Moser; Ralph Francis Murphy; Lonnie D'Orsa; Ted Post; Richard Wilson
- Starring: Richard Boone
- Narrated by: Richard Boone
- Theme music composer: Victor Young; Edward Heyman
- Opening theme: "Blue Star"
- Composer: Victor Young
- Country of origin: United States
- Original language: English
- No. of seasons: 2
- No. of episodes: 59 (list of episodes)

Production
- Executive producer: Worthington Miner
- Producer: Frank LaTourette
- Cinematography: William A. Sickner; Lester Shorr
- Running time: 30 minutes
- Production company: Medic TV Productions

Original release
- Network: NBC
- Release: September 13, 1954 – August 27, 1956

Medic is an American medical drama television series that aired on NBC from September 13, 1954, to November 19, 1956. It was television's first doctor drama to focus attention on medical procedures.

Created by James Moser, Medic tried to create realism (City Hospital and The Doctor had not), which would typify subsequent medical shows. Moser had previously written for the radio shows Dragnet and Dr. Kildare.

== Synopsis ==
Medic episodes were introduced and narrated by Richard Boone, playing Dr. Konrad Styner, who sometimes also appeared in the stories. Fifty-nine segments aired from September 1954 to November 1956.

The series was introduced each week by theme music written by Victor Young. Eventually, with lyrics added by Edward Heyman, the song became popular under the title "Blue Star."

== Episodes ==
Season	Episodes	Originally released	
Season	Episodes	First released	Last released
1	28	September 13, 1954	June 13, 1955
2	31	September 5, 1955	August 27, 1956

== Production ==
Worthington Miner was the producer. The series was broadcast on Mondays from 9 to 9:30 p.m. Eastern Time.

Episodes were based on case histories from the Los Angeles County Medical Association. Filming was done at actual clinics and hospitals, often with real-life doctors and nurses as part of the cast.

== Home media ==
On November 15, 2011, Timeless Media Group released Medic- The Groundbreaking Hospital Series on DVD in Region 1 for the first time. The six-disc set features 44 of the 59 episodes of the series, as these are the only episodes for which Timeless was able to obtain the rights. This is believed to be due to only 44 of the prints being salvageable.

== Guest stars ==
Notable guest stars included:

- Claude Akins
- Corey Allen
- Charles Bronson
- Charles Cane
- Cindy Carol
- Lee J. Cobb
- Richard Crenna
- Richard H. Cutting
- Bobby Driscoll
- Jean Engstrom (three episodes - all in 1955)
- Beverly Garland
- Sam Gilman
- Dennis Hopper (his acting debut)
- Lee Marvin
- Vera Miles
- Danny Mummert
- James O'Rear
- Ainslie Pryor (two episodes - both in 1956)
- Denver Pyle
- Dick Sargent
- John Saxon
- Robert F. Simon
- Robert Vaughn
- Michael Winkelman

== Awards and nominations ==
Year	Award	Result	Category	Recipient	Notes
1955	Emmy Award	Nominated	Best Written Dramatic Material	James E. Moser	For episode "White Is the Color"
1955	Emmy Award	Nominated	Best Television Film Editing	Jodie Copelan	For episode "White Is the Color"
1955	Emmy Award	Nominated	Best Original Music Composed for TV	Victor Young	-
1955	Emmy Award	Nominated	Best Individual Program of the Year	-	For episode "White Is the Color"
1955	Emmy Award	Nominated	Best Dramatic Series	-	-
1955	Emmy Award	Nominated	Best Actress in a Single Performance	Beverly Garland	-
1955	Emmy Award	Nominated	Best Actor Starring in a Regular Series	Richard Boone	-
1955	Emmy Award	Won	Best Direction of Photography	Lester Shorr	For episode "I Climb the Stairs"
1956	Emmy Award	Nominated	Best Producer - Film Series	Frank La Tourette	-
1956	Emmy Award	Won	Best Cinematography for Television	William A. Sickner	For episode "Black Friday"
1957	Emmy Award	Nominated	Best Musical Contribution for Television	Sidney Fine	For orchestration of Victor Young's music
1956	Directors Guild of America Award	Nominated	Outstanding Directorial Achievement in Television	Ted Post	For episode "Mercy Wears an Apron"
