= Lauren Weedman =

American actress and comedian (born 1969)

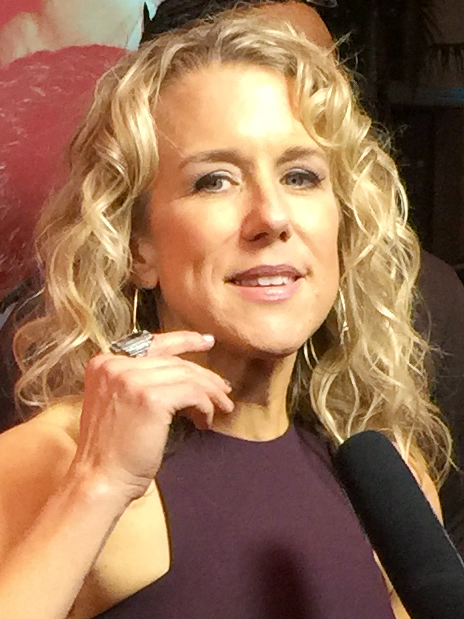
- Weedman in 2015
- Born: March 5, 1969 (age 57)
- Spouse: Michael Neff (div. 2003)
- Children: 1

Comedy career
- Years active: 1997–present
- Medium: Television; film; theater radio; books
- Genres: Observational comedy, self-deprecation

Lauren Weedman (born March 5, 1969) is an American actress, comedian and writer. She is known for her roles on Looking and Hacks, receiving a Primetime Emmy Award for Outstanding Guest Actress in a Comedy Series nomination for the latter.

== Career ==
Weedman had a regular role on the HBO television series Looking (2014–2015) and its subsequent series finale television film Looking: The Movie. She is also known for her roles in films such as Date Night (2010) and The Five-Year Engagement (2012) and for appearing as a guest star on various series such as Hung, New Girl, and 2 Broke Girls. She was also a correspondent on The Daily Show from 2001 to 2002. Weedman has written and performed several solo shows, including Homecoming, BUST, and The People's Republic of Portland.

== Personal life ==
Her marriage to Seattle writer Michael Neff ended in 2003. She subsequently moved to Santa Monica, California and gave birth to a son, Leo, in 2010 with her longtime boyfriend, director Jeff Weatherford, whom she married in 2012 and divorced the next year.

Weedman was diagnosed with Bell's palsy in 2024.

== Filmography ==
=== Film ===
| Year | Title | Role | Notes |
|---|---|---|---|
| 2006 | The Ex | Alice | |
| 2008 | The Kitty Landers Show | Laurette T. Hinch | Short |
| 2009 | Imagine That | Rose | |
| 2010 | Date Night | Wendy | |
| 2011 | 50 Greatest | Herself | Short |
| 2011 | The Five-Year Engagement | Chef Sally | |
| 2014 | The Gambler | Banker | |
| 2014 | Silent Shadows | Val | Short |
| 2014 | Every Beautiful Thing | Magdalene | Short |
| 2016 | Joshy | Isadora | |
| 2016 | Rainbow Time | Nina | |
| 2017 | The Little Hours | Francesca | |
| 2017 | Wilson | Cat Lady | |
| 2018 | The Honor List | Hannah | |
| 2020 | Horse Girl | Cheryl | |
| 2022 | Spin Me Round | Liz Bence | |
| 2024 | Junk | Lynette | |

=== Television ===
| Year | Title | Role | Notes |
|---|---|---|---|
| 1997–1999 | Almost Live! | Various | |
| 2000–2007 | I Love the New Millennium | Herself | |
| 2001–2002 | Best Week Ever | Herself | |
| 2001–2002 | The Daily Show with Jon Stewart | Herself | |
| 2004 | Reno 911! | Hysterical Woman | 2 episodes |
| 2004 | A2Z | Herself | |
| 2004 | CMT: 20 Merriest Christmas Videos | Herself | |
| 2004 | Pryor Offenses | Jenine | TV movie |
| 2005 | World Cup Comedy | Herself | |
| 2005 | I Love the 90s: Part Deux | Herself | |
| 2005 | I Love the 80s 3-D | Herself | |
| 2005 | I Love the Holidays | Herself | |
| 2005 | I Love Toys | Herself | |
| 2006 | Talkshow with Spike Feresten | Lauren / Medical Correspondent | 2 episodes |
| 2007 | Curb Your Enthusiasm | Nurse | Episode: "The Lefty Call" |
| 2009 | United States of Tara | Heidi Sawyer | Episode: "Alterations" |
| 2009–2010 | Hung | Horny Patty | 5 episodes |
| 2010 | Our Show | | TV movie |
| 2010 | True Blood | La Donna | 2 episodes |
| 2011 | Childrens Hospital | Angry Mother | Episode: "The Chet Episode" |
| 2012 | New Girl | Mysteria | Episode: "Virgins" |
| 2013–2019 | Arrested Development | Twink / Joni Beard | 7 episodes |
| 2013 | Masters of Sex | Quadruplets' Mother | Episode: "Standard Deviation" |
| 2013 | Dads | HR Lady | Episode: "My Dad's Hotter Than Your Dad" |
| 2014 | 2 Broke Girls | Shayne | Episode: "And the Reality Problem" |
| 2014–2015 | Looking | Doris | Series regular, 16 episodes |
| 2015 | Kittens in a Cage | Lois | 2 episodes |
| 2016 | Looking: The Movie | Doris | TV movie |
| 2017 | Playing House | Cookie | 2 episodes |
| 2017 | Dice | Tarot Card Reader | Episode: "Big Fan" |
| 2017 | Tarantula | Bess (voice) | 9 episodes |
| 2017 | Graves | Bonnie Clegg | 3 episodes |
| 2018 | Will & Grace | Cheryl | Episode: "Staten Island Fairy" |
| 2018 | LA to Vegas | Layla | Episode: "Training Day" |
| 2018 | I'm Dying Up Here | Aunt Janice | Episode: "Plus One" |
| 2018 | SuperMansion | Plantessa (voice) | Episode: "Comicarnage" |
| 2018 | The Kominsky Method | Director | Episode: "Chapter 5: An Agent Crowns" |
| 2018–2020 | Single Parents | Franny | 3 episodes |
| 2019 | Santa Clarita Diet | Amanda | Episode: "Forever!" |
| 2019 | This Close | Pastor | Episode: "Look Both Ways" |
| 2019 | Mom | Angela | Episode: "Fake Bacon and a Plan to Kill All of Us" |
| 2019–2020 | Briarpatch | Barbara Jean Littleton | 2 episodes |
| 2020 | Tales from the Loop | Kate | 3 episodes |
| 2021 | Euphoria | Dr. Mardy Nichols | Episode: "Fuck Anyone Who's Not a Sea Blob" |
| 2021 | Cinema Toast | Annie the Housekeeper (voice) | Episode: "Familiesgiving" |
| 2021 | Special | Tonya | 3 episodes |
| 2021–2026 | Hacks | Mayor Jo Pezzimenti | Recurring cast |
| 2022–2026 | Abbott Elementary | Kristin Marie | 5 episodes |
| 2022 | Mr. Mayor | Fern | Episode: "The Debate" |
| 2022 | Kevin Can F**k Himself | Lorraine | Recurring cast (Season 2) |
| 2023 | Captain Fall | Additional voices | Episode: "Boner Medicine" |
| 2025 | Sirens | Patrice | Recurring character |
| 2025 | Nobody Wants This | Lois | Episode: "Crossroads" |
| 2025 | St. Denis Medical | Nurse Pam | Episode: "A Strong Cup of Coffee" |
| 2026 | Wonder Man | Kathy Friedman | Episode: "Kathy Friedman" |

== Theater ==
| Year | Production | Location | Notes |
|---|---|---|---|
| 1996 | Pants on Fire | The Empty Space Theatre, Seattle, WA | NA |
| 1998 | Texarkana Waltz | The Empty Space Theatre, Seattle, WA | NA |
| 1997–2002 | Homecoming | On the Boards, Seattle; Seattle Repertory Theatre, Seattle; Off-Broadway Westside Theatre, NY, NY; HBO's U.S.C.A., Aspen, CO; Westbeth Theatre, NY, NY | Solo show |
| 1998 | Yea, Tho I Walk/Huu | ACT Theatre, Seattle, WA; Annex Theatre, Seattle, WA | Solo show |
| 1999 | If Ornaments Had Lips | UCB Theatre, NY, NY; On The Boards, Seattle, WA | Music by James Palmer |
| 2000 | Amsterdam the Musical | The Empty Space Theatre, Seattle, WA; Krane Theatre, NY, NY | Solo show |
| 2001 | They Got His Mouth Right | UCB Theatre, NY, NY; P73 New Work Festival, NY, NY | Solo show |
| 2002 | Slow Boat to China | Bloomington Playwrights Project, Bloomington, IN | NA |
| 2003 | Rash | The Empty Space Theatre, Seattle, WA; Hudson Theatre, LA, CA | Solo show |
| 2004 | Move Your Meet, Strange Encounters in Public Spaces | Los Angeles | Performed with Company of Strangers |
| 2007 | Bust | The Empty Space Theatre, Seattle, WA | Solo show |
| 2008 | Wreckage | Theatre Babylon, Seattle, WA; Bumbershoot Festival, Seattle, WA; REDCAT New Works Festival, LA, CA; Highways Performance, Santa Monica, CA; Tricklock Theatre Festival, Albuquerque, NM; Ars Nova, NY, NY; KEF Productions Solo Festival, Studio Theatre, NY, NY | Solo show |
| 2009 | No You Shut Up | Passage Theatre, NY, NY | Solo show |
| 2013, 2015 | People's Republic of Portland | Portland Center Stage, Portland, OR | Solo show |
| 2014 | I Think You're Beautiful | Drexel University, Philadelphia, PA | Solo show |
| 2014 | Blame It On Boise | Boise Contemporary Theater, Boise, ID | Solo show |
| 2014 | It's Not You It's Me | Talbott Street Theater, Indianapolis, IN | Example |
| 2014 | Good For You | Tricklock Theater Company, Albuquerque, NM | Solo show |

== Honors and awards ==
- 2002 Seattle Times Footlight Award, Best New Play, Best Solo Show
- 2002 The Best Women Playwrights of 2002, editor D.L. Lepidus
- 2007 Alpert Award for the Arts in Playwriting for Bust
- 2014 Critics' Choice Television Award for Best Guest Performer in a Comedy Series, Looking, Nominated
- 2026 Primetime Emmy Award for Outstanding Guest Actress in a Comedy Series, Hacks, Nominated

== Bibliography ==
- A Woman Trapped in a Woman's Body: Tales from a Life of Cringe (2007), Sasquatch publishing
- Miss Fortune: Fresh Perspectives on Having it All From Someone Who Is Not Okay (2016), Plume publishing
