= Eastland v. United States Servicemen's Fund =

1975 United States Supreme Court case

- Supreme Court of the United States

Argued January 22, 1975 Decided May 27, 1975
- Full case name: James Eastland v. United States Servicemen's Fund
- Citations: 421 U.S. 491 (more) 95 S. Ct. 1813; 44 L. Ed. 2d 324
- Argument: Oral argument
- Decision: Opinion

Holding
- The activities of the Senate Subcommittee, the individual Senators, and the Chief Counsel fall within the "legitimate legislative sphere," and those activities are protected by the absolute prohibition of the Speech or Debate Clause of the Constitution against being "questioned in any other Place," and hence are immune from judicial interference.

Court membership
- Chief Justice Warren E. Burger Associate Justices William O. Douglas · William J. Brennan Jr. Potter Stewart · Byron White; Thurgood Marshall · Harry Blackmun; Lewis F. Powell Jr. · William Rehnquist

Case opinions
- Majority: Burger, joined by White, Blackmun, Powell, Rehnquist
- Concurrence: Marshall, Brennan, Stewart
- Dissent: Douglas

Laws applied
- Speech or Debate Clause, U.S. Const. Amend. I

Eastland v. United States Servicemen's Fund, 421 U.S. 491 (1975), was a United States Supreme Court case that defined the limits of Congress's authority to issue subpoenas. In an 8–1 decision, the court found that Congress was within its constitutional authority to issue a subpoena for the banking records of the United States Servicemen's Fund. The U.S. Constitution's Speech or Debate Clause barred the court from questioning the good faith of the committee's investigation.

== Background ==
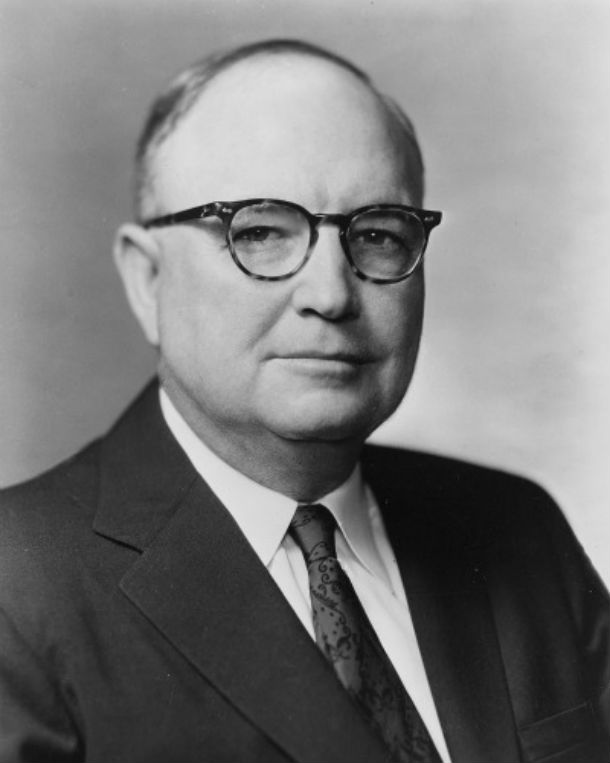
James Eastland

James Eastland was a Democratic senator from Mississippi who supported American involvement in the Vietnam War and chaired the Senate Subcommittee on Internal Security tasked with investigating "subversive activities" under the Internal Security Act of 1950.

The United States Servicemen's Fund (USSF) was a nonprofit organization, outspoken in its opposition to the war, aimed at providing support to military personnel. USSF had been involved in publishing underground newspapers expressing anti-war sentiments.

The Senate Subcommittee issued a subpoena for USSF's bank records. USSF filed a lawsuit complaining that the subpoena violated their First Amendment rights because its "sole purpose" was to force the public disclosure of confidential membership information and "harass, chill, punish and deter" to impede the plaintiff's First Amendment rights to freedom of the press and freedom of association.

The plaintiffs sought two forms of relief:

1. A permanent injunction restraining enforcement of the subpoena through contempt proceedings.
2. A declaratory judgment declaring the subpoena and investigation unconstitutional.

The District Court denied USSF's request for an injunction, stating that Congress had a legitimate interest in investigating the organization. The Court of Appeals reversed, finding that the subpoena for bank records could expose donor identities thereby infringing on protected First Amendment rights.

== Consequences ==
Eastland v. United States Servicemen's Fund was cited in court cases involving the tax returns of Donald Trump. Trump claimed that Congress had exceeded its authority in subpoenaing the returns.
