= List of Medic episodes =

This is a list of episodes for the NBC television series Medic.

== Series overview ==
Season	Episodes	Originally released	
Season	Episodes	First released	Last released
1	28	September 13, 1954	June 13, 1955
2	31	September 5, 1955	August 27, 1956

== Episodes ==
=== Season 1 (1954–55) ===
No. overall	No. in season	Title	Directed by	Written by	Original release date
1	1	"White Is the Color"	Bernard Girard	James E. Moser	September 13, 1954
A pregnant woman fights leukemia, hoping to live long enough to give birth to her child.
2	2	"Laughter Is a Boy"	Bernard Girard	James E. Moser	September 20, 1954
John Coslow and his brother Pete are orphans who live with their Uncle Al. John is a young boy who has a serious speech impediment, a cleft palate, which requires surgery. His brother tries to get help for him.
3	3	"I Climb the Stairs"	Bernard Girard	James E. Moser	September 27, 1954
Dr. Styner must perform complex surgery on a nineteen-year-old girl who has had a heart attack.
4	4	"Death Rides a Wagon"	Bernard Girard	James E. Moser	October 4, 1954
In the Old West, doctors must cope with a cholera epidemic that has struck a wagon train.
5	5	"Vagrant Heart, Vagrant Cup"	Bernard Girard	James E. Moser	October 11, 1954
An alcoholic wife and mother of two faces the nearly overwhelming prospect of going through withdrawal and overcoming cirrhosis of the liver before she can begin the more difficult process of attempting to conquer her addiction to drink.
6	6	"My Brother Joe"	Bernard Girard	James E. Moser	October 25, 1954
A father has a car accident leaving his ten-year-old son in a coma. As a team of specialists attempt to save the boy's life, his family tries to deal with the anger and guilt.
7	7	"Day 10"	Bernard Girard	James E. Moser	November 1, 1954
When a family comes down with plague, public health officials rush to try and isolate the disease by quarantining the neighborhood. Then a second case breaks out on the other side of town.
8	8	"After the Darkness"	Bernard Girard	James E. Moser	November 8, 1954
A blind pianist, who lost his sight from lime exposure during childhood, learns he could regain vision with a corneal transplant.
9	9	"With This Ring"	Bernard Girard	James E. Moser	November 22, 1954
A teenaged mother-to-be checks into the hospital, with Dr. Styner performing surgery. The importance of pre-natal care is highlighted.
10	10	"My Very Good Friend Albert"	Bernard Girard	James E. Moser	November 29, 1954
A musician has lost his job after losing one-third of his hearing to otosclerosis. Then he learns that an operation may restore his hearing.
11	11	"The Wild Intruder"	James E. Moser	John Meredyth Lucas	December 6, 1954
With only a week to go before her wedding, a young woman is diagnosed with breast cancer, and must undergo an operation at once. A medical team must deal with both her physical problems and her fragile mental state at the same time.
12	12	"Red Christmas"	Bernard Girard	James E. Moser	December 20, 1954
Heavy drinking at a Christmas party leads to an automobile accident, which endangers a young girl's vision.
13	13	"When Comes the Autumn"	Unknown	James E. Moser	December 27, 1954
An aging widow lives with her son and his family. She begins to feel unwanted and becomes quarrelsome.
14	14	"Boy in the Storm"	James E. Moser	John Meredyth Lucas	January 3, 1955
Robert Maxwell is seventeen, and comes from a wealthy family of high social status. He also has epilepsy. His guardian aunt has kept Robert, an orphan, in virtual isolation since childhood out of fear, shame, and ignorance. Now that she has died, there is a chance that Robert may get the care and attention that he needs.
15	15	"Breath of Life"	Ted Post	Art and Jo Napoleon, John Meredyth Lucas	January 24, 1955
Dr. Robert Parker, thirty-seven, married with two children, has struggled to develop a lucrative practice. His drive for success has put a strain on his marriage. Everything he has worked for, however, has to be set aside when he succumbs to an acute case of polio and must be confined in an iron lung.
16	16	"A Time to Be Alive"	Ted Post	Art Napoleon, Jo Napoleon	January 31, 1955
A young hemophiliac takes a dangerous fall.
17	17	"Flash of Darkness"	John Meredyth Lucas	John Meredyth Lucas, James E. Moser	February 14, 1955
This "what-if" episode imagines what would happen in the event of a nuclear strike on Los Angeles. Dr. Styner and his colleagues are at a warehouse outside the city for a training session, but must try to make their way back to the devastated city after the nuclear attack. Along the way they try to treat and save as many injured and radiation-poisoned patients as they can with what little medicine they have, and are forced by circumstances to decide which patients can be saved... and which ones they'll have to let die.
18	18	"Mercy Wears an Apron"	Ted Post	Art and Jo Napoleon	February 21, 1955
A public health nurse works to rehabilitate a former movie star who's now a paraplegic after a hunting accident.
19	19	"Dr. Impossible"	Worthington Miner	Endre Bohem, Louis Vittes	February 28, 1955
In 1884, pioneering surgeon Dr. William Stewart Halstead finds that he and three colleagues are slowly but surely becoming seriously addicted to the cocaine that they have been using in anesthetic self-experiments.
20	20	"Break Through the Bars"	Anton Leader	John Meredyth Lucas	March 14, 1955
Henry Fisher is depressed and starts to act strangely. He's not eating or sleeping and is having trouble at work. After a particularly stressful day at work, he snaps and really starts doing odd things and ends up in the hospital, where a medical team decides that his problem can best be treated with electroshock therapy.
21	21	"Death Is a Red Balloon"	Ted Post	John Meredyth Lucas	March 21, 1955
Agnes Frazier, a twenty-seven-year-old mother of two, abruptly experiences a terrible headache which causes her to collapse. Tests indicate that she has had a brain hemorrhage. Agnes and her husband agree that she must risk the complicated, dangerous surgery.
22	22	"All My Mothers, All My Fathers"	John Meredyth Lucas	James E. Moser	March 28, 1955
A six-year-old girl has spent practically all of her life at the hospital. Doctors and nurses have raised her since she was brought there as abandoned baby.
23	23	"Physician, Heal Thyself"	Worthington Miner	Sidney Marshall	April 11, 1955
Two young medical residents are both told that they are in the early stages of tuberculosis. One accepts the diagnosis and begins medical treatment; the other denies it and continues with his strenuous lifestyle.
24	24	"Wall of Silence"	John Meredyth Lucas	John Meredyth Lucas	April 18, 1955
Following an assault that results in a severe head injury, a newspaper editor develops aphasia and must struggle through the lengthy rehabilitative process necessary to re-learn even basic speech and literary skills.
25	25	"My Child's Keeper"	John Meredyth Lucas	Sylvia Richards, James E. Moser	April 25, 1955
Two mothers leave their children, a little girl and a baby boy, alone downstairs. The girl discovers a lighter and starts a blaze that engulfs them both, killing the baby. At the hospital, one mother holds the other responsible for what happened.
26	26	"Lifeline"	John Meredyth Lucas, James E. Moser	John Meredyth Lucas	May 16, 1955
The only survivor of an explosion aboard a cruiser, a young seaman's life is saved by a Navy Hospital Ship Surgeon.
27	27	"Never Comes Sunday"	James E. Moser	James E. Moser	May 23, 1955
A blow to a child's head causes brain trauma. Her family struggles to cope with her new limitations.
28	28	"General Practitioner"	Bernard Girard	James E. Moser	June 13, 1955
Dr. Canfield is a family physician with a troubled marriage, trying to balance the needs and demands of his patients with those of his family .

=== Season 2 (1955–56) ===
No. overall	No. in season	Title	Directed by	Written by	Original release date
29	1	"All the Lonely Night"	John Brahm	R. Wright Campbell & James E. Moser	September 5, 1955
A young teacher has a serious illness but has refused to get medical treatment. When she is finally taken to a hospital, she is in dire need of surgery. Again she refuses treatment, so the doctors call in a psychiatrist.
30	2	"Walk with Lions"	Ted Post	Otis Gaylord & James E. Moser	September 12, 1955
Unaware that he has developed diabetes, a struggling young prizefighter who is also a gifted artist endangers his life by continuing to push himself in order to earn the money needed to further his education.
31	3	"And Then There Was Darkness and Then There Was Light: Part 1"	John Brahm	James E. Moser	September 26, 1955
Immediately after giving birth to her fourth child, Frances Dunbar develops a severe case of postpartum depression and becomes convinced that she can, and will, violently murder the baby.
32	4	"And Then There Was Darkness and Then There Was Light: Part 2"	John Brahm	John Kneubuhl	October 3, 1955
After unsuccessfully attempting to kill her baby, Frances Dunbar voluntarily admits herself to a state psychiatric institution where she receives treatment that slowly helps her to realize the reasons for her troubled mental state.
33	5	"A Room, a Boy and Mr. Bodine"	Unknown	Unknown	October 10, 1955
Ignored by his rich parents, a young boy constructs a dream world of his own with his favorite teddy bear. Unfortunately, the ragged bear aggravates his asthma.
34	6	"When I Was Young"	George M. Cahan	James E. Moser	October 24, 1955
A middle-aged woman sparks off family quarrels with her behavior as she undergoes menopause.
35	7	"When Mama Says Jump"	Jack Gage	John Kneubuhl	October 31, 1955
Dr. Styner offers advice and support when a 17-year-old track star develops severe acne and chronic fatigue due to stresses caused by his demanding mother's determination to see him achieve his father's dream of Olympic stardom.
36	8	"Candle of Hope"	James E. Moser	Ken Kolb	November 7, 1955
A childless young Greek Orthodox couple seek treatment for infertility.
37	9	"Black Friday"	Unknown	Unknown	November 21, 1955
True story of Army Doctor Charles A. Leale: He was in the audience at Ford's Theater when President Lincoln was shot. Leale and two other doctors worked for twelve hours trying to save Lincoln's life.
38	10	"A Glass of Fear"	James E. Moser	Ken Kolb	November 28, 1955
A cartoonist, who is physically healthy, has hypochondria.
39	11	"Pray Judgment"	George Cahan	John Kneubuhl	December 5, 1955
A county coroner's investigation will exonerate or incriminate a distraught woman who was alone with her younger sister's baby boy when the infant died suddenly and unexpectedly.
40	12	"The World So High"	Thor L. Brooks	James E. Moser	December 26, 1955
In order to test the effects of high altitude on the human body, an Army doctor parachutes from a plane at an altitude of eight miles.
41	13	"A Time for Sleep"	George M. Cahan	John Kneubuhl	January 2, 1956
This episode stars actual anesthesiologist Dr. Eldin Smith in this depiction of his contributions to the field. Nurse Norma Weber also plays herself.
42	14	"The Laughter and the Weeping"	Ralph Francis Murphy	Otis Gaylord, James E. Moser	January 16, 1956
A young man gave up college to become a professional wrestler in order to support his bedridden father. Now he learns that he needs plastic surgery.
43	15	"Just Like Your Father"	George M. Cahan	John Kneubuhl	January 23, 1956
An elderly judge collapses and is diagnosed with a pancreatic tumor.
44	16	"If Tomorrow Be Sad"	Richard Wilson	James E. Moser	February 6, 1956
A man decides to divorce his wife, a top photographic model, after she is diagnosed with multiple sclerosis.
45	17	"The Homecoming"	John Brahm	John Kneubuhl & James E. Moser	February 13, 1956
Leprosy victim Allan Connolly is finally pronounced healthy and fit to resume a productive life in normal society, but he and his wife are unprepared for the rejection and irrational fear evinced by their friends and neighbors.
46	18	"Who Search for Truth"	John Brahm	James E. Moser	February 27, 1956
This is the story of Alexis St. Martin, a young fur trapper who was shot in the side and was used by Dr. William Beaumont for research into the function of the human digestive system.
47	19	"The Glorious Red Gallagher"	Unknown	Unknown	March 12, 1956
After almost 40 years, Nurse Gallagher is retiring. Her last case is a difficult one: postnatal depression has robbed a young mother of her will to live.
48	20	"My Best Friend, My Guilty Friend"	James E. Moser	Ken Kolb	March 19, 1956
Doctors work to discover if the administration of oxygen to premature infants is the reason that some of them go blind.
49	21	"Awaken to Spring"	John Brahm	Gene L. Coon	March 26, 1956
The issue of euthanasia is dramatized in this episode.
50	22	"Don't Count the Stars"	James E. Moser	Gene L. Coon	April 9, 1956
An upcoming young singer is told he has cancer of the larynx and must have surgery.
51	23	"The Inconstant Heart"	James E. Moser	Ken Kolb	April 23, 1956
Doctors offer a man with an incurable heart ailment a radiological treatment called a "cobalt bomb."
52	24	"Someday We'll Laugh"	James E. Moser	Ken Kolb	May 7, 1956
In this story of a general practitioner, a patient is indebted to the doctor for saving his daughter's life. To show his gratitude, he finances new equipment for the doctor's practice.
53	25	"To the Great, a Most Seldom Gift"	James E. Moser	Ken Kolb	May 14, 1956
A man who works in the garment business hides the fact that he has an ulcer. When he collapses, he's rushed to the hospital for emergency surgery. The procedure, a stomach resection, is shown on-camera.
54	26	"The Good Samaritan"	John Brahm	Gene L. Coon & Edward T. Tyler	May 21, 1956
Dr. Styner stops to help a married couple involved in an automobile accident, but finds himself on trial for medical malpractice when the wife subsequently and surprisingly becomes addled and partially paralyzed on her left side.
55	27	"Reach of the Giant: Part 1"	John Brahm	Gene L. Coon & John Kneubuhl	June 11, 1956
A man who has an arthritic spinal condition forces his wife to leave him so that he can face his problem alone.
56	28	"Reach of the Giant: Part 2"	John Brahm	Gene L. Coon & John Kneubuhl	June 18, 1956
With his marriage near collapse, the man undergoes a very rare spinal surgery known as an osteotomy.
57	29	"Till the Song Is Done, till the Dance Is Gone"	John Brahm	James E. Moser	July 9, 1956
Mary Elizabeth Berry, just turned seventeen, is forced to restrict her activities because she has a bad valve in her heart. When she has an attack at a school dance, she is rushed to the hospital. The decision is made to replace the bad valve with an artificial one.
58	30	"She Walks in Beauty"	John Brahm	Ken Kolb	August 6, 1956
A twelve-year-old girl with a club foot doesn't want surgery to correct the condition. Her admiration of the poet Lord Byron, who had a similar condition, stands in the way.
59	31	"This Strange Ending"	John Brahm	Jack Jacobs & James E. Moser	August 27, 1956
A newspaperman investigates the story of a beautiful ballerina whose career was cut short when she died of cancer.
