= The Homecoming (short story) =

"The Homecoming" is a 2011 science fiction short story by American writer Mike Resnick. It was first published in Asimov's Science Fiction.

== Synopsis ==
A man who has had himself surgically transformed into an alien comes home to visit his mother, who is dying of an ailment that causes dementia.

== Reception ==
"The Homecoming" was a finalist for the 2012 Hugo Award for Best Short Story. Jim C. Hines noted that the story "had a lot going for it", but also that its conclusion "felt too quick and easy", observing that it could be read as "a metaphor for a father unable to accept his son’s sexuality."
