= Homecoming (2001 play) =

2001 play by Lauren Weedman

- Written by: Lauren Weedman
- Characters: Sharon
- Original language: English
- Genre: One-person show

Premiere
- Date premiered: September 10, 2001
- Place premiered: Westside Theatre

Homecoming is an Off-Broadway one-person show by Lauren Weedman that premiered at Westside Theatre on September 10, 2001. Following the September 11 attacks, Weedman announced that the show would be postponed till January 21, 2002, with the venue changed to the Arclight Theatre.

== Plot ==
The show revolves around Lauren, who is trying to find her mom, her step-mom, her bossy sister, her aging grandmother, and her boyfriend.

== Cast ==
Homecoming was directed by Maryann Lombardi and it starred Lauren Weedman. This show is based on true stories from her life.

== Reviews ==
The following excerpts of reviews were quoted as part of the promotion for a May 29, 2011 performance at Don't Tell Mama in New York City:

- "Weedman...weaves a fascinating tale of a girl baby's adoption into a marginally functional family, switching back and forth playing the baby's grandmother, mother, sister and the teenage girl herself as the story progresses over a number of years..what Weedman does so skillfully is bring us into the disjointed world of a family trying to find its way in a confusing world." Seattle Post-Intelligencer
- "It all began simply enough. All that adopted teenager Lauren Weedman wanted was a picture of her biological mother to 'have around to look at once in a while.' But this simple request launches Weedman-and her family-on a whirlwind of actions and emotions, recounted in [a] sharply observed, emotionally true and often hilarious autobiographical show." -- The Seattle Times, Janet Tu
- "Weedman's acting is so deft and versatile - and her observations of personal mannerisms and tone are so sharp - that [Homecoming] seems populated with dozens of vivid characters."—The Seattle Times
- "Weedman has a particularly malleable face and a capacity to alter her body language so adroitly that she's able, in a flash, to transform herself from the wacky, nervous Sharon into the tentative, frightened Lauren..."—Seattle Post-Intelligencer, Alice Kaderlan

"...recalls Carol Burnett in her prime." --Back Stage West, David Edward Hughes
