= Joseph F. Girzone =

American novelist

The Reverend Joseph F. Girzone
- Born: Joseph Francis Girzone; May 15, 1930; Albany, New York, U.S.
- Died: November 29, 2015 (aged 85); Albany, New York, U.S.
- Occupations: Writer, Catholic priest
- Parent(s): Peter & Margaret Girzone
- Website: http://www.joshuamountainministries.org

Joseph Francis Girzone (May 15, 1930 – November 29, 2015), sometimes known as the "Joshua Priest", was an American Catholic priest and writer, most notably as the author of the Joshua series of novels.

== Life ==
=== Early life ===
Girzone was born in Albany, New York, to Peter, a butcher, and Margaret Girzone, the oldest of their twelve children. It was a struggling family, which experienced the shame of eviction during his childhood.

Girzone entered the Carmelite Order as a young man and was ordained as a priest in 1955. A few years later he chose to leave the order in favor of life as a diocesan priest and was accepted by the Diocese of Albany. He then served at various parishes of the diocese, in the course of which he became active in advocating for the elderly. He was a driving force in the formation of the Office for the Aging of Montgomery County.

Girzone had an auto-immune system disease that was destroying his red blood cells as they were being introduced into the blood stream. In 1981, however, Girzone was diagnosed with a heart condition and hypertension which was judged to be fatal, leading him to retire from active ministry. He accepted the forfeiture of any pension or medical benefits from the diocese as part of an agreement for his early retirement.

=== Authorial Success ===
Following his retirement, Girzone embarked on a second career as a full-time writer and speaker. He published his first novel, Joshua, in 1983, which was the first of a whole series of books which had the premise of Jesus Christ returning to earth and living as an itinerant carpenter. After being rejected by all the publishing houses he had approached, he founded his own publishing company, Richelieu Court Publications, to release the novel. He carried boxes of the book in his trunk of his car, making modest sales at different locales.

The story, written in a simple language, of a carpenter and Christ-like figure who arrives in a small town and transforms peoples' lives with random acts of kindness and messages of peace struck a chord in readers and was brought to the attention of an editor at Macmillan Publishers. This major publisher bought the rights to the novel and a paperback version was released in August 1987, and with its national distribution and marketing might, published five more titles in the "Joshua" series. The books reached an unexpected level of popularity. After Girzone's initial success, he was offered a contract by Image Books, a Catholic-oriented imprint of Doubleday.

The Joshua novels eventually numbered ten. They were translated into a dozen languages, selling more than three million copies and became known among publishing executives as "the Joshua phenomenon".

==== Film ====
The first book of the series was made into a movie with the same name, released in 2002, which was financed by the wealthy entrepreneur Philip Anschutz, who was a fan of the novel. The cast includes the noted actors F. Murray Abraham and Tony Goldwyn in the lead.

=== Philanthropy and Spiritual Guidance ===
Having sold over a million copies of his books within some ten years, the earnings were so great that in 1995 Girzone was able to acquire a 100-acre estate, with a 21-room Victorian mansion on it, in Altamont, New York, which he named Joshua Mountain. He founded there the Joshua Foundation, an organization dedicated to making Jesus better known throughout the world. Sacks of mail arrived for Girzone weekly from lapsed Catholics and spiritual seekers of all stripes showed up at his home to share how his books had affected their lives, and he would hold classes on spirituality there.

Girzone gave spiritual talks and led retreats, both around the nation and internationally. He purchased a retreat center that he ran in Lothian, Maryland.

Through his foundation, Girzone personally funded various projects to answer the needs of the people in need in the region. In Schoharie County, the foundation operated a food pantry, delivered meals and helped to pay heating bills of the rural poor. He also covered the tuition of needy high school students.

=== Decline ===
After that long period of success, due to changes in the publishing industry and the loss of his aging readership, Doubleday dropped Girzone without any warning after the lackluster release in 2007 of Joshua's Family. He then donated the 21-room house he had been living in, with its huge annual tax and heating bills, to his foundation and moved to an apartment above the estate's garage. He eventually sold the Maryland facility.

== Death ==
In 2015, Girzone entered hospice care at St. Peter's Hospital in Albany, where he died on November 29 of that year from complications due to his long-standing heart disease.

== Writings ==
- Who Will Teach Me? (1982)
- Gloria: a Diary (1982)
- Joshua (1983)
- Kara: The Lonely Falcon (1985)
- Joshua and the Children (1989)
- Joshua and the Shepherd (1990)
- Joshua in the Holy Land (1993)
- Never Alone (1994)
- Joshua and the City (1995)
- What is God? (1996)
- Joey: An inspiring true story of faith and forgiveness (1997)
- A Portrait of Jesus (1998)
- Joshua: The Homecoming (1999)
- Jesus, His Life and Teachings: As Recorded by His Friends Matthew, Mark, Luke, and John (2000)
- The Parables of Joshua (2001)
- The Messenger (2002)
- Trinity: A New Living Spirituality (2002)
- Joshua in a Troubled World : A Story for Our Time (2005)
- My Struggle with Faith (2006)
- Joshua's Family (2007)
- Jesus: A New Understanding of God’s Son (2009, Doubleday)
- 'The Wisdom of His Compassion' (2009, 2012) [Orbis Books]
- The Homeless Bishop (2011) (Orbis Books)
- (Introduction by Joseph F. Girzone) Colors of the Spirit by Dorothy K. Ederer, Doubleday, 1998. ISBN 978-0-385-48848-8
- Joshua's Reflections - Volumes 1-6 of 10 (Beginning in 2017)
- Free to Live (2017)
