= Homecoming: When the Soldiers Returned from Vietnam =

1989 book

- First edition
- Author: Bob Greene (collected and edited by)
- Language: English
- Publisher: Putnam
- Publication date: 1989
- Publication place: United States
- Media type: Print
- Pages: 269 pages
- ISBN: 0399133860
- OCLC: 18414768

Homecoming: When the Soldiers Returned From Vietnam is a book of selected correspondence published in 1989. Its genesis was a controversial newspaper column of 20 July 1987 in which Chicago Tribune syndicated columnist Bob Greene asked whether there was any truth to the folklore that Vietnam veterans had been spat upon when they returned from the war zone. Greene believed the tale was an urban legend. The overwhelming response to his original column led to four more columns, then to a book collection of the most notable responses.

After Greene made his best effort to check the truth of the accounts to be printed, he inserted a minimum of his own commentary in the text, preferring to let the veterans' words speak for themselves. The reprinted letters show a steady pattern of mistreatment of Vietnam veterans by all segments of American society, and in a wide variety of settings.

Homecoming was later criticized by those who did not believe that Vietnam veterans had been spat upon.

== Genesis of the book ==
One of the contentious issues of the Vietnam War and its aftermath was the American public's response to its returning military veterans. Even as the citizenry's opposition to the war mounted, tales began to spread of returning veterans being mistreated. The archetypical story became one of antiwar hippie protesters spitting upon returning veterans in an airport. Twelve years after the Vietnam War ended, on 20 July 1987, syndicated columnist Bob Greene of the Chicago Tribune proposed testing the truth of what he considered an urban legend. The headline of his column, syndicated in 200 papers, asked: "If You're A Veteran, Were You Spat Upon?" As he wrote in the text:

Even during the most fervent days of anti-war protest, it seemed that it was not the soldiers whom protesters were maligning. It was the leaders of government, and the top generals—at least, that is how it seemed in memory. One of the most popular chants during the anti-war marches was, "Stop the war in Vietnam, bring the boys home." You heard that at every peace rally in America. "Bring the boys home." That was the message. Also, when one thought realistically about the image of what was supposed to have happened, it seemed questionable. So-called "hippies", no matter what else one may have felt about them, were not the most macho people in the world. Picture a burly member of the Green Berets, in full uniform, walking through an airport. Now think of a "hippie" crossing his path. Would the hippie have the nerve to spit on the soldier? And if the hippie did, would the soldier—fresh from facing enemy troops in the jungles of Vietnam—just stand there and take it?

He ended the article:

So if you are a Vietnam veteran, and you were ever spat upon by a civilian after you returned home, please drop a line to this column. No jokes, please. If it really happened, it is no laughing matter. It would help if you provide approximate dates, places and circumstances.

His work address followed. So did a spate of letters.

== Compiling Homecoming ==
Greene promised to run results of the survey in a future column. As the letters poured in, the future column became four written columns excerpting eleven of the responses. He included an open invitation for anyone who had spat upon a returning veteran to explain their motivation. Greene eventually received in excess of 1,000 responses to his question about being spat upon. He was also receiving a steady feedback of readers' telephone calls reacting to the four columns; many of the calls were rawly emotional. He decided he did believe spitting occurred, concluding:

There were simply too many letters, going into too fine a detail, to deny the fact. I think you will agree, after reading the letters, that even if several should prove to be not what they appear to be, that does not detract from the overall story that is being told.

Greene was so touched by the emotionally moving letters he received, as well as by his readers' responses, that he decided to compile them into a book. He reprinted a total of 234 letters in the book. He added only occasional commentary, with the aim of letting the veterans' letters speak for themselves. Two young aides helped Greene compile the book. One of them, Susan Falcone, noted:

the raw honesty of emotion from individuals I might have stereotyped as unemotional macho men ... As I touched each letter, I felt as if I was being allowed to touch the life of the person who wrote it.

Greene did his best to authenticate letters before he included them in his book. He set aside any that seemed to him to be phony. Then he wrote the purported authors of the letters he did select, to verify their identity and solicit their permission to print the epistles in a book instead of a newspaper column. After that, he also used a source in the Veterans Administration to verify that the authors of selected letters had served in Vietnam. Even then, Greene took the further precaution of warning his readers that there might still be a phony letter or two included in the book. In a controversial claim by a former chaplain's assistant, this latter comment would be cited as a cause to doubt the veracity of Greene's book and of Vietnam veterans in general.

== Summary ==
Greene reprinted 81 letters detailing Vietnam veterans being spat upon in the first section of Homecoming. The persons described as assailing the veterans came from a wide spectrum of American society. Assailants of the veterans are variously described as "a woman about forty", "middle-aged lady", "youngster", "college types", "group of people", "sweet little old lady", "well groomed little old lady", "rude couple", and "teenagers"—as well as "hippies" and "flower children". The veterans assaulted were not just ordinary soldiers; they ran the gamut of military occupations, including such noncombatants as a surgeon, a dentist, a West Point cadet, and a Catholic priest. In one case, a passerby remarked that a soldier who had been killed in action deserved to die. Reported locales did not just include airports, but bus stations and ordinary street settings; in one case, the spitting occurred in New Zealand. In several cases, the spat-upon veteran related minor retaliation upon his assailant, although most vets avoided such.

A second section of Homecoming contained responses from veterans who claimed they were not spat upon; many of them did not believe any of their fellow veterans were spat upon. However, some of them recounted disrespectful acts other than spitting. To quote Dr. Gordon L. Webb's letter:

I never met a serviceman who was spat upon, nor heard a first-person report of a serviceman being spat upon. Open hostility—yes. Unkind comments—yes.

A third section came from a small category of responses, and relates acts of kindness shown toward the writers because they were veterans. Even in this category of responses, reference can be found to overheard insults, to bullying, and to unkind acts.

A fourth section of Greene's book is a collection of instances where Vietnam veterans were not spat upon, but were insulted and/or abused. One example cited was the amputee who was told he deserved to lose his arm because he served in Vietnam.

A final section of 13 miscellaneous letters is called, "I Would Like to Tell Another Side of the Story ..." Among these letters are two written by the mothers of soldiers who had been killed in action.

By the time Homecoming was published, there had been no response from those who had spat upon veterans.

Overall, several themes were evident in the book. In addition to being spat upon, a great majority of the responding veterans related other instances of disrespect, insults, and verbal and physical abuse. Removing one's uniform and changing into civilian clothing is another recurring theme. Not mentioning military service, and hiding the fact that they had served in Vietnam is another. Anger and bitterness at perceived betrayal is yet another constant. To quote one of the letters, by Gary C. Peters:

A Vietnam vet could take being spat upon by one person. What broke our hearts was being spat upon by our country.

== Critical response ==
According to Kulik, some of the stories Greene reprinted "rank somewhere between the impossible and the improbable ... Even the stories that are not obviously false contain clear warning signs. The vast majority of them cannot be corroborated. There are no named witnesses, none". In 1998 sociologist Jerry Lembcke published The Spitting Image: Myth, Memory and the Legacy of Vietnam, a similar examination of whether returning Vietnam veterans were spat upon by hippies, and concluded that it was not a documented occurrence of the time. He points to the lack of news coverage of spitting incidents before claiming that anti-war activists and Vietnam veterans were mutually supportive of one another. Lembcke does not explore the possibility that non-hippies spat upon returning veterans, nor that such might not be news.

A Los Angeles Times review characterized the book as searing but shallow, expressing the view that Greene should have tracked down and interviewed the letter writers. However, Florida's Sun-Sentinel calls the reprinted letters "incredibly moving" and claims Greene's infrequent interjected comments are unneeded.

== See also ==
- Myth of the spat-on Vietnam veteran

== Sources ==
- Greene, Bob (1989). Homecoming: When the Soldiers Returned from Vietnam. G. P. Putnam's Sons. ISBN 9780399133862.
- Kulik, Gary (2009). 'War Stories': False Atrocity Tales, Swift Boaters, and Winter Soldiers – What Really Happened in Vietnam. Potomac Books. ISBN 978-1597976374.
- Lembcke, Jerry (1998). The Spitting Image: Myth, Memory, and the Legacy of Vietnam. New York University Press. ISBN 9780814751466.
- Loeb, Paul Rogat (1995). Generation at the Crossroads: Apathy and Action on the American Campus (Reprint ed.). Rutgers University Press. ISBN 0813522560.
