= Paul Galloway =

American journalist

- Born: 1934; Memphis, Tennessee, U.S.
- Died: February 2, 2009 (aged 74); Tulsa, Oklahoma, U.S.
- Occupations: Newspaper reporter, columnist and storyteller

Paul Galloway (1934 – February 2, 2009) was an American newspaper reporter, columnist and storyteller who wrote for both the Chicago Sun-Times and the Chicago Tribune.

Galloway was born in Memphis, Tennessee in 1934. His father served as a pastor and (later as a bishop) in the United Methodist Church while his mother ran a literacy program. Galloway attended the University of Oklahoma and worked at the school's alumni magazine for ten years after serving in the United States Army.

Rejecting job offers from Playboy and Sports Illustrated, he took a position as a reporter at the Chicago Sun-Times starting in the summer of 1969. He wrote articles on a wide range of serious news and light topics and was selected to author the newspaper's deadline story marking the December 1976 death of longtime-Mayor Richard J. Daley.

While at the Sun-Times, Galloway co-authored Bagtime with columnist Bob Greene, a serial told from the perspective of fictitious supermarket bagger Mike Holiday which ran in 1977 and 1978. The columns became the source for a book published under the same name that was also turned into a stage musical directed by Robert Falls at the Wisdom Bridge Theatre and a television pilot shot for the Fox Broadcasting Company by Bruce Helford.

He switched over to the Chicago Tribune in 1984, where he served as the religion columnist and wrote stories ranging from personality profiles to weightier matters. He retired from the newspaper in 1999.

He split his time with his wife post-retirement living in a Chicago apartment and homes in New Buffalo, Michigan and Tulsa, Oklahoma.

Galloway died at age 74 on February 2, 2009, in Tulsa of a heart attack. His only immediate survivor was his wife, Maggie Prochotska, whom he married in 1984.
