= The Spitting Image =

Book by Jerry Lembcke

- Author: Jerry Lembcke
- Language: English
- Subject: Vietnam War
- Genre: History; Military History
- Published: 1998 (New York University Press)
- Publication place: United States
- Media type: Print (Hardcover)
- Pages: 217
- ISBN: 9780814751473
- LC Class: DS559.73.U6 L46 1998

The Spitting Image: Myth, Memory and the Legacy of Vietnam is a 1998 book by Vietnam veteran and sociology professor Jerry Lembcke. The book is an analysis of the widely believed narrative that American soldiers were spat upon and insulted by anti-war protesters upon returning home from the Vietnam War. The book examines the origin of the earliest stories; the popularization of the "spat-upon image" through Hollywood films and other media, and the role of print news media in perpetuating the now iconic image through which the history of the war and anti-war movement has come to be represented.

Lembcke contrasts the absence of credible evidence of spitting by anti-war activists with the large body of evidence showing a mutually supportive, empathetic relationship between veterans and anti-war forces. The book also documents efforts of the Nixon Administration to drive a wedge between military service members and the anti-war movement by portraying democratic dissent as a betrayal of the troops. Lembcke equates this disparagement of the anti-war movement and veterans with the similar stab-in-the-back myth propagated by Germany and France after their war defeats, as an alibi for why they lost the war. Lembcke details the resurrection of the myth of the spat-upon veteran during subsequent Gulf War efforts as a way to silence public dissent.

== Origins ==
A persistent but unfounded criticism leveled against those who protested in opposition to the Vietnam War is that they spat upon and otherwise derided returning soldiers, calling them "baby-killers". During the late 1980s and early 1990s, years after the Vietnam War ended, the proliferation of these spitting stories increased greatly. As both a Vietnam veteran and a member of the anti-war movement, Lembcke knew this criticism ran counter to what he personally experienced and witnessed. To the contrary, one of the hallmarks of the period's anti-war movement was its support for the troops in the field and the affiliation of many returning veterans with the movement. Lembcke was motivated to look further into the truth and origins of this spat-upon veteran myth, and the contradiction between historical fact and popular collective memory. Other observers had already noticed the proliferation of stories and questioned whether the spitting stories even made sense. In 1987, columnist Bob Greene noted:

Even during the most fervent days of anti-war protest, it seemed that it was not the soldiers whom protesters were maligning. It was the leaders of government, and the top generals—at least, that is how it seemed in memory. One of the most popular chants during the anti-war marches was, "Stop the war in Vietnam, bring the boys home." You heard that at every peace rally in America. "Bring the boys home." That was the message. Also, when one thought realistically about the image of what was supposed to have happened, it seemed questionable. So-called "hippies," no matter what else one may have felt about them, were not the most macho people in the world. Picture a burly member of the Green Berets, in full uniform, walking through an airport. Now think of a "hippie" crossing his path. Would the hippie have the nerve to spit on the soldier? And if the hippie did, would the soldier—fresh from facing enemy troops in the jungles of Vietnam—just stand there and take it?

By 1992, the Director of the Connelly Library and curator of the Vietnam War Collection at LaSalle University listed the spitting myth as one of the "Top Six Myths" from the Vietnam era, and observed the myth "derives from the mythopoeic belief that returning GIs were routinely spat upon at some time during their repatriation to the USA. This particular round of tales has become so commonplace as to be treated reverently even among otherwise wisely observant veterans." In 1994, scholar Paul Rogat Loeb wrote, "to consider spitting on soldiers as even remotely representative of the activist response is to validate a lie", and noted that myths like that of anti-war activists spitting on soldiers have rewritten or "erased history". An academic study into the making and shaping of collective memory found that evidence of antiwar activists targeting troops was virtually nonexistent. Instead, it found popular memory was manipulated by national security elites and a complicit news media by frequently labeling resistors to U.S. war efforts as "anti-troop". As observed by Clarence Page after interviewing Lembcke and Greene, "the stories have become so widely believed, despite a remarkable lack of witnesses or evidence, that ironically the burden of proof now falls on the accused, the protesters; not their accusers, the veterans. Antiwar protesters must prove the episodes didn't happen, instead of the veterans having to prove they did."

Given this complete lack of evidence that spitting occurred, but acknowledging that it is impossible to prove something never happened, Lembcke set out:

to show how it is possible for a large number of people to believe that Vietnam veterans were spat upon when there is no evidence that they were. In effect, my strategy was to set aside the question of whether or not such acts occurred and to show why even if they did not occur it is understandable that the image of the spat-upon veteran has become widely accepted. Indeed, given the manipulation of information and images that began with the Nixon administration and continued at the hands of filmmakers and the news media during the 1970s and 1980s, it would be remarkable if a majority of Americans had not come to believe that Vietnam veterans were abused by the anti-war movement.

== Synopsis ==
At the time he wrote The Spitting Image, Lembcke had not found a single substantiated media report to support the now common claims of spitting. He theorizes that the reported "spitting on soldiers" scenario was a mythical projection by those who felt "spat upon" by an American society tired of the war; an image which was then used to discredit future anti-war activism and serve political interests. He suggests that the manufactured images of pro-war antipathy against anti-war protesters also helped contribute to the myth. Lembcke asserts that memories of being verbally and physically assaulted by anti-war protesters were largely conjured, noting that not even one case could be reliably documented. He further suggests the "baby-killer" and "murderer" components of the myth may have been reinforced, in part, by the common chants by protesters aimed at President Lyndon Baines Johnson, like "Hey, hey, LBJ, how many kids did you kill today?"

The Spitting Image asserts that the image of abuse of soldiers by anti-war demonstrators only really became ingrained in the American consciousness years after the war had come to a close. Lembcke attributes part of the legend's growth to films relating to Vietnam, notably First Blood, in which a "spat-upon veteran" image is popularized. He writes that the myth of the spat-upon veteran was later revived by President George H. W. Bush as a way to help suppress dissent when selling the Gulf War to the American people. Lembcke believes that resurrection of the myth was useful in promoting the yellow ribbon Support our Troops campaign, as it implies that for one to support the troops, one must also support the war. It conflates the ideas of anti-war sentiment and anti-troop sentiment, despite a common anti-war chant being "Support the Troops: Bring them Home!"

The "spat-upon veteran" meme became so pervasive that some found it hard not to believe. In 1989, Bob Greene's book Homecoming reprinted letters he had solicited, asking to hear from veterans if they had been spat upon. Greene's book includes 63 alleged accounts involving spitting, and 69 accounts from veterans who do not believe anyone was spat upon after returning from Vietnam, among other stories. Greene admits he couldn't validate the authenticity of the accounts in the letters he received, but he did believe spitting must have occurred, stating, "There were simply too many letters, going into too fine a detail, to deny the fact." Greene concluded, "I think you will agree, after reading the letters, that even if several should prove to be not what they appear to be, that does not detract from the overall story that is being told." "Greene was too willing to suspend disbelief", says Lembcke, who cited Greene's book as an example of how prolific the stories had become and also for the patterns that appeared in them. Lembke said, "These stories have to be taken very seriously, but as historical evidence they are problematic. In the first place, stories of this type didn't surface until about ten years after the end of the war. If the incidents occurred when the story tellers say they did, in the closing years of the war, why is there no evidence for that? Moreover, many of the stories have elements of such exaggeration that one has to question the veracity of the entire account."

Lembcke points out that there were several newspaper accounts of pro-war demonstrators spitting on anti-war demonstrators and suggests that these oral accounts could easily have been reinterpreted and inverted and made into stories about activists spitting on veterans. He highlights the contradictions between the collective memory of today and contemporaneous historical records, like the results from a 1971 poll showing over 94% of returning Vietnam soldiers received a "friendly" welcome. Lembcke also notes how it was older vets from previous wars who most often scorned the returning Vietnam Vets; in 1978 the Vietnam Veterans of America vowed in its founding principle: "Never again will one generation of veterans abandon another".

In The Spitting Image, Lembcke acknowledges that he cannot prove the negative—that no Vietnam veteran was ever spat on—saying it is hard to imagine there not being expressions of hostility between veterans and activists. "I cannot, of course, prove to anyone's satisfaction that spitting incidents like these did not happen. Indeed, it seems likely to me that it probably did happen to some veteran, some time, some place. But while I cannot prove the negative, I can prove the positive: I can show what did happen during those years and that that historical record makes it highly unlikely that the alleged acts of spitting occurred in the number and manner that is now widely believed."

== Reception and influence ==
=== Reviews ===
A review published in the Los Angeles Times reads: "The image is ingrained: A Vietnam veteran, arriving home from the war, gets off a plane only to be greeted by an angry mob of antiwar protesters yelling, 'Murderer!' and 'Baby killer!' Then out of the crowd comes someone who spits in the veteran's face. The only problem, according to Jerry Lembcke, is that no such incident has ever been documented. It is instead, says Lembcke, a kind of urban myth that reflects our lingering national confusion over the war."

A review published in The Berkshire Eagle called the book "Well-argued and documented." Maurice Isserman of the Chicago Tribune wrote: "The myth of the spat-upon veteran is not only bad history, but it has been instrumental in selling the American public on bad policy." A review published in the San Francisco Chronicle argued that "Lembcke builds a compelling case against collective memory by demonstrating that remembrances of Vietnam were almost at direct odds with circumstantial evidence." Peace activist David Dellinger referred to the book as the "best history I have seen on the impact of the war on Americans, both then and now."

Karl Helicher of Library Journal wrote that Lembcke "presents a stunning indictment of this myth, an illusion created, he maintains, by the Nixon-Agnew administration and an unwitting press to attribute America's loss in Vietnam to internal dissension. In fact, the antiwar movement and many veterans were closely aligned, and the only documented incidents show members of the VFW and American Legion spitting on their less successful Vietnam peers. But Lembcke's most controversial conclusion is that posttraumatic stress disorder was as much a political creation—a means of discrediting returning vets who protested the war as unhinged—as it was a medical condition. The image of the psycho-vet was furthered through such Hollywood productions as The Deer Hunter and Coming Home. This forceful investigation challenges the reader to reexamine assumptions about the dark side of American culture that glorifies war more than peace. Highly recommended for large public libraries and for all academic peace studies collections."

Christian G. Appy of The Chronicle of Higher Education wrote that "Lembcke's debunking of the spitting stories is quite persuasive. But he has much broader aims. Not only was there no spitting, he argues, but there was no hostility or tension at all between veterans and protesters. In fact, he characterizes their relationship as 'empathetic and mutually supporting.' ... My own view is that the spitting stories are largely mythic, but that the myth itself reflects the deep anger and animosity that many veterans harbored toward the antiwar movement. Their anger often reflected a sense of class injustice that gave their more privileged peers greater freedom to avoid the war. ... I base my conclusions on extensive interviews I have conducted with Vietnam veterans since the early 1980s. Lembcke, however, gives no credence to the possibility that veterans themselves played a role in creating the myth of antiwar spitters, or that the myth teaches us anything meaningful about the class and wartime experiences of veterans. For him, the myth is almost entirely a product of Hollywood and right-wing politicians."

Mary Carroll of Booklist wrote that Lembcke "makes a strong case that tales of antiwar activists spitting at returning vets are myth. ... He notes that contemporary media, government, and polling data show no evidence of antiwar spitting incidents; the few events reported had supporters of the war targeting opponents. But later studies reported hostility toward veterans; "the spitting image" epitomized that narrative. Similar images were common in post-World War I Germany and France after Indochina; Lembcke suggests the Nixon administration cultivated this notion of betrayal because it stigmatized both the antiwar movement and veterans against the war."

=== Online debate and investigation ===
In 2000, 2004, and again in 2007, journalist Jack Shafer rekindled firestorms when he berated news media outlets for uncritically repeating the myth of the spat-upon veteran. Shafer's Slate Magazine online articles on the matter, which frequently cited Lembcke's research, generated enormous feedback; the May 2000 article alone received nearly 300 postings on the subject in just a few days, one of its largest-ever responses.

According to Shafer, the myth persists primarily because:

1. "Those who didn't go to Vietnam—that being most of us—don't dare contradict the 'experience' of those who did;
2. The story helps maintain the perfect sense of shame many of us feel about the way we ignored our Vietvets;
3. The press keeps the story in play by uncritically repeating it, as the Times and U.S. News did;
4. Because any fool with 33 cents and the gumption to repeat the myth in his letter to the editor can keep it in circulation. Most recent mentions of the spitting protester in Nexis are of this variety."

Shafer acknowledges that it's possible that a Vietnam veteran somewhere might have been spat upon during the war years, and notes that Lembcke concedes as much because nobody can prove something never happened. Shafer announced a challenge to his readers, "Indeed, each time I write about the spit myth, my inbox overflows with e-mail from readers who claim that a spitting protester targeted them while they were in uniform. ... If you can point me to a documented case of a returning Viet vet getting spat upon, please drop a line."

Likewise, Lembcke joined the discussion and also commented on it in the Humanity & Society journal, saying the stories just keep getting better, and asking for any evidence to be raised. The discussions spawned yet another round of more than 60 stories, yet only one was credible.

Northwestern Law School professor James Lindgren also joined the discussions and, after a review of contemporary news sources, found many news accounts from the 1960s and 1970s that discussed spitting incidents against servicemembers, contrary to Lembcke's claims that stories about spitting only began occurring in 1980. Lembcke provided an 18-point response to Lindgren's research, offering rebuttals to most of his claims and expressing interest in one of them. A December 27, 1971 CBS Evening News report on veteran Delmar Pickett who said he was spat at in Seattle appeared, according to Lembcke, to have some validity as a claim.

Some second-hand news accounts that mention spitting do actually exist, although there has been no evidence to support the narrative that anti-war demonstrators were responsible. Documented accounts exist where the anti-war demonstrators were actually the victims, not the perpetrators. Other commentators have since addressed the myth to various degrees, even referencing the debate spawned by the Slate files.

In his 2009 book War Stories, historian and Vietnam veteran Gary Kulik devoted a whole chapter to the myth of "Spit-upon veterans". He closely examined Greene's book of letters and the Slate files, as well as the research by Lindgren and Lembcke. Kulik noted the contradictory nature of the stories in Greene's book and concluded that Greene arrogantly dismissed the "surprising number" of veterans who "refuse to believe" the spitting stories, and wrote, "Greene was not just credulous, but negligently irresponsible." Kulik also criticized Lindgren's research, writing, "Lindgren's evidence includes only one single first-person ("I was spit upon") account—the stories that are at the heart of Lembcke's book—and it appears the none of the accounts he cites were actually witnessed by a reporter. Moreover, Lindgren does not cite a single case of a Vietnam veteran spit upon as he returned home, and that was the story that would ultimately be repeated and believed." Kulik concluded that the spitting stories were formulaic and unbelievable, and were propagated to serve the political goals of those who wished to vilify the anti-war movement. "The image of 'hippie' men and women hawking up gobs of phlegm to hurl at the ribbons of veterans, as a pervasive and commonplace act, is surely false."

Specialist in civil-military relations and advisor to the National Institute of Military Justice, Diane Mazur, also examined the works by Greene, Lembcke and Lindgren, and concluded: "There is no contemporaneous evidence that Americans who opposed the war expressed those beliefs by spitting on or otherwise assaulting returning Vietnam Veterans. ... The idea, however, that spitting on or mistreating Vietnam veterans was in any way typical or representative of anything in that era is completely false. ... It is by far the most powerful Vietnam War meme—a cultural unit of information passed from one person to another, like a biological gene—because it can be deployed instantly to silence difficult but necessary conversations about the military. For that reason alone the conventional wisdom is important, because it explains much about our civil-military dynamic today. It is also important, however, to understand why that accepted memory is untrue, and who benefits most from keeping it alive. The myth of the spat-upon Vietnam veteran is a difficult one to challenge. ... One intrepid soul, Professor Jerry Lembcke, ... stepped into the fray ... Every time he discusses his findings in a public forum, a hail of angry responses follows, but his explanations and conclusions are compelling and unsettling."

== See also ==
- GI Coffeehouses
- GI Underground Press
- Sir! No Sir!, film about the soldier & sailor resistance during the Vietnam War
- Soldiers in Revolt: GI Resistance During the Vietnam War, book about soldier & sailor resistance during the Vietnam War
- Vietnam stab-in-the-back myth
- Vietnam Syndrome
- Vietnam Veterans Against the War
- Vietnam War in film
