= Bob Greene =

American journalist and author (born 1947)

- Born: Robert Bernard Greene Jr. March 10, 1947 (age 79); Bexley, Ohio, U.S.
- Occupation: Journalist
- Spouse: Susan Koebel (m. 1971)
- Children: 2

Robert Bernard Greene Jr. (born March 10, 1947) is an American journalist and author. He worked for 24 years for the Chicago Tribune newspaper, where he was a columnist. Greene has written books on subjects including Michael Jordan, Alice Cooper, and U.S. presidents. His book Hang Time: Days and Dreams with Michael Jordan became a bestseller.

== Early life ==
Originally from Bexley, Ohio (a suburb of Columbus), Greene attended Northwestern University in Evanston, Illinois, and became a reporter and feature writer for the Chicago Sun-Times upon graduating in 1969, receiving a regular column in the paper within two years. Greene first drew significant national attention with his book Billion Dollar Baby (1974), a diary of his experiences while touring with rock musician Alice Cooper and portraying Santa Claus during the show.

== Newspaper column ==
Greene's primary focus remained his newspaper column, for which he won the National Headliner Award for best column in 1977 from an American journalism group. Shortly afterward, Greene was hired by Chicago Tribune and began making occasional guest appearances on local television, eventually landing a commentary slot on the ABC news program Nightline. He also wrote the "American Beat" column in Esquire.

According to the September 27, 2021 Wall Street Journal, "columnist Bob Greene, syndicated then in more than 100 newspapers, started the successful WAM movement—We Ain’t Metric—in 1978."

In January 1980, Greene assisted Los Angeles Police in apprehending a man who had allegedly written letters to Greene as well as to police threatening to go on a killing spree. At that time Greene's column appeared in approximately 120 newspapers, including one in the Los Angeles community of Huntington Park where the letter writer lived. In the first week of January, Greene traveled to Los Angeles at the request of police. Through the use of his column, Greene gave out a phone number to his hotel room that the letter writer, who identified himself in letters as "Moulded to Murder", was to use to contact Greene. Police were able to trace the call and arrest the man at a payphone. Greene chronicled these events in his daily column as they occurred.

In 1989, he asked Vietnam veterans if they had really been spat upon when they returned from overseas. The response was so overwhelming, he published a book—Homecoming: When the Soldiers Returned From Vietnam— full of the letters he received.

During the 1990s, Greene spent time covering Michael Jordan of the Chicago Bulls basketball team, forming an unlikely friendship that Greene documented in two best-selling books. The movie Funny About Love (1990) was based on a Greene column. In 1993, his novel All Summer Long was published by Doubleday, and his columns are collected in several books.

Though Greene was popular with readers, critics accused him of excessive sentimentality, heavy writing and repetitive coverage of the same subject, most notably the Baby Richard child custody saga. A therapist for the birth parents in the custody case, Karen Moriarty, claimed in the book Baby Richard: A Four-Year-Old Child Comes Home that Greene never spoke to the parents, although he covered the subject with 100 columns in which he strongly took the side of the adoptive parents. Greene claimed that the biological parents, the Kirchners, did not respond to his requests for interviews.

The Chicago Reader ran a derisive column, "BobWatch: We Read Him So You Don't Have To," penned pseudonymously by Chicago Sun-Times columnist Neil Steinberg. Greene's experiences as a roadie for Alice Cooper were parodied by comics writer Steve Gerber in the background of the villain Dr. Bong (real name: Lester Verde) in the 1970s Marvel comic Howard the Duck. Critical coverage of Greene, which offered extensive coverage of his predilection for rewriting pop-culture press releases, was also featured in Spy magazine in a December 1988 article by Magda Krance, "You Wouldn't Want to Be Bob Greene". Krance characterized his output as "the journalistic equivalent of Tuna Helper".

== Dismissal from the Tribune ==
In September 2002 Greene was forced to resign from his newspaper column after admitting to an extramarital relationship that took place 14 years prior. The female with whom Greene had a relationship was 17, legal age in Illinois, and had graduated from high school in the months between their first meeting and his invitation to take her out to dinner. Their sole hotel tryst was described in the Chicago Tribune as a "sexual encounter that stopped short of intercourse," and Greene told Esquire that he demurred at going further, telling her, "You should wait to do this with someone you love."

Four months after Greene's resignation from the Chicago Tribune, his wife Susan died of heart failure following a month-long respiratory illness.

== Current books ==
Greene did not return to newspaper or magazine journalism. He continues to write books and is a contributing writer to CNN.com. His 2006 book, And You Know You Should Be Glad: A True Story of Lifelong Friendship, is a personal account of the illness and death of his lifelong friend Jack Roth at age 57. Publishers Weekly reviewed it as follows:

Bestselling author Greene... looks back on his youth in Bexley, Ohio (pop. 13,000), where he and his four pals grew up together, calling themselves ABCDJ (for Allen, Bob, Chuck, Dan and Jack)... Greene met Jack in kindergarten, and they remained best friends for life. Remembering people and places they shared, the two revisit old haunts, discovering that their beloved Toddle House, where they once went for late-night chocolate pie, is now a Pizza Plus. Greene's repetitive, rambling free associations recall everything from his Halloween costume and old songs to ice cream parlors, state fairs and clothing fads. Unfortunately, the author's dusty attic of lost Americana is cluttered with clichés, nostalgia and overly sentimental yearnings.

His next book, When We Get to Surf City: A Journey through America in Pursuit of Rock and Roll, Friendship, and Dreams, was released on May 13, 2008. It is a chronicle of a 15-year period when he intermittently toured with surf-rock musicians Jan and Dean, singing backup and playing guitar.

His most recent book, Late Edition: A Love Story was released on July 7, 2009. In it, he wistfully chronicles his days as a copyboy and other apprentice positions at the Columbus Citizen-Journal and the Columbus Dispatch.

== Awards and honors ==
In 1977, Greene won the National Headliner Award for writing the previous year's best column.

In 1995, Greene was named Illinois Journalist of the Year. In the same year he was awarded the Peter Lisagor Award for Public Service Journalism for his reporting on courts failing children in need.

== Bibliography ==
- Late Edition: A Love Story (St. Martin's Press, 2009) ISBN 978-0-312-37530-0
- When We Get to Surf City: A Journey Through America in Pursuit of Rock and Roll, Friendship, and Dreams (St. Martin's Press, 2008) ISBN 978-0-312-37529-4
- And You Know You Should Be Glad: A True Story of Lifelong Friendship (William Morrow, 2006) ISBN 0-06-088193-3
- Fraternity: A Journey in Search of Five Presidents (Crown, 2004) (interviews with ex-presidents) ISBN 1-4000-5464-8
- Once Upon a Town: The Miracle of the North Platte Canteen (William Morrow, 2002) ISBN 0-06-008196-1
- Duty: A Father, His Son, And The Man Who Won The War (William Morrow, 2000) (half about his relationship with his father, half on Paul W. Tibbets) ISBN 0-380-97849-0
- Notes on the Kitchen Table: Families Offer Messages of Hope for Generations to Come (Doubleday, 1998) (co-authored with his sister, D.G. Fulford) ISBN 0-385-49061-5
- The 50-Year Dash: The Feelings, Foibles, and Fears of Being Half-a-Century Old (Doubleday, 1997) ISBN 0-385-48502-6
- Chevrolet Summers, Dairy Queen Nights (Viking, 1997) (collection of columns) ISBN 0-670-87032-3
- Rebound: The Odyssey of Michael Jordan (Viking, 1995) ISBN 0-670-86678-4
- To Our Children's Children: Preserving Family Histories for Generations to Come (Doubleday, 1993) (co-authored with his sister, D.G. Fulford) ISBN 0-385-46797-4
- All Summer Long (Doubleday, 1993) (novel) ISBN 0-385-42589-9
- Hang Time: Days and Dreams with Michael Jordan (Doubleday, 1992) ISBN 0-385-42588-0
- He Was a Midwestern Boy on His Own (Atheneum, 1991) (collection of columns) ISBN 0-689-12117-2
- Homecoming: When the Soldiers Returned from Vietnam (Putnam, 1989) ISBN 0-399-13386-0
- Be True to Your School: A Diary of 1964 (Scribner, 1987) (reconstructed high-school diary) ISBN 0-689-11612-8
- Cheeseburgers (Atheneum, 1985) (collection of columns) ISBN 0-689-11611-X
- Good Morning, Merry Sunshine: A Father's Journal of His Child's First Year (Atheneum, 1984) ISBN 0-689-11434-6
- American Beat (Atheneum, 1983) (collection of columns) ISBN 0-689-11397-8
- Bagtime (Popular Library, 1977) (collection of columns written with Paul Galloway, from the perspective of fictitious supermarket bagboy Mike Holiday, under which name the book was published; also turned into a stage play and TV movie) ISBN 0-445-04057-2
- Johnny Deadline, Reporter (Nelson-Hall, 1976) (collection of columns and other journalism) ISBN 0-88229-361-3
- Billion Dollar Baby (Atheneum, 1974) (account of roadie work for Alice Cooper) ISBN 0-689-10616-5
- Running (Regnery, 1973) (journal of 1972 presidential campaign)
- We Didn't Have None of Them Fat Funky Angels on the Wall of Heartbreak Hotel (Regnery, 1971) (collection of columns and other journalism)
