= David Heinz =

American film editor (born 1980)

David Walsh Heinz
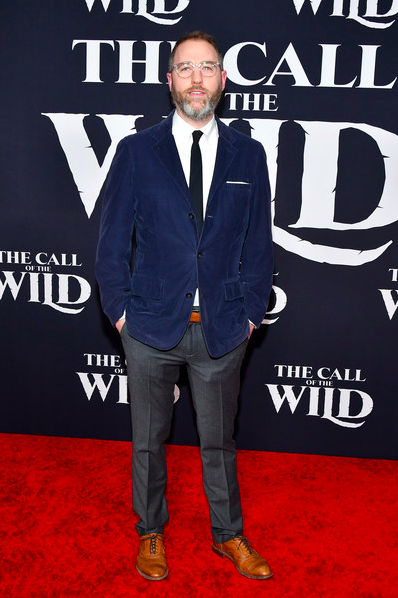
- Heinz at The Call of the Wild premiere, 2020
- Born: 1980 (age 45–46); United States
- Education: Columbia College Chicago
- Occupations: Film editor, film director
- Years active: 2003–present

David Walsh Heinz is an American film editor best known for his work on A Christmas Story Christmas (2022), The Call of the Wild (2020), This Means War (2012) and his visual effects editing on War for the Planet of the Apes (2017), The Jungle Book (2016), and Dawn of the Planet of the Apes (2014). He is also a writer and director known for American Folk (2017), a member of the Motion Picture Editors Guild and the American Cinema Editors (ACE).

== Filmography ==
=== Editor ===
Heinz was the editor on the following films, as indicated.

- The Covenant (2006) (visual effects editor)
- Underworld: Evolution (2006) (visual effects editor)
- Live Free or Die Hard (2007) (visual effects editor)
- Hitman (2007) (first assistant editor: USA)
- The Scientist (2009) (Short) (editor)
- X-Men Origins: Wolverine (2009) (visual effects editor)
- Gulliver's Travels (2010) (first assistant editor)
- Dragon Age: Redemption (2011) (TV Series) (editor)
- Los Angeles 10101 (2011) (Short Film Anthology) (editor)
- This Means War (2012) (additional editor)
- Not Exclusive (2012) (Short) (editor)
- The Frozen (2012) (editor)
- Till It Gets Weird (2012) (Short) (editor)
- King of Norway (2013) (Short) (editor)
- The Secret Lives of Dorks (2013) (editor)
- Adult World (2013) (editor)
- The Wicked (2013) (Video) (consulting editor)
- Wildlike (2014) (additional editor)
- The Last Light (2014) (editor)
- Dawn of the Planet of the Apes (2014) (visual effects editor)
- The Dramatics: A Comedy (2015) (editor)
- Too Late (2015) (editor)
- The Jungle Book (2016) (visual effects editor)
- American Folk (2017) (editor)
- War for the Planet of the Apes (2017) (visual effects editor)
- The Call of the Wild (2020) (editor)
- A Christmas Story Christmas (2022) (editor)
- Deliver Us (2023) (editor)
- Animal Friends (2026) (editor)

=== Director ===
- Los Angeles 10101 (2011) (Short Film Anthology)
- American Folk (2017)

=== Writer ===
- Los Angeles 10101 (2011) (Short Film Anthology)
- American Folk (2017)

== Directorial debut ==
Heinz made his film directorial and writing debut with American Folk in 2018. The film starred Joe Purdy, Amber Rubarth, Krisha Fairchild and was originally titled 'SEPTEMBER 12TH' before Heinz was forced to change it. Variety noted Heinz demonstrated "considerable assurance in his feature directorial bow." It garnered Top Indie Film Awards for best feature and best editing in addition to nominations for best writing and directing. Awards and nominations included the following:

- Anchorage International Film Festival (2017 Nominee, Best Feature, Narrative Feature Film)
- Cleveland International Film Festival (2017 Winner, Best American Independent Feature Film)
- Heartland Film Festival (2017 Nominee, Grand Prize for Dramatic Feature, Dramatic Feature)
- Crossroads Film Festival (2017 Nominee, Festival Award Best Feature)
- Napa Valley Film Festival (2017 Nominee, Best Narrative Feature, Grand Jury Award Best Narrative Feature)
- Port Townsend Film Festival (2017 Winner, Jury Special Commendation Best Music)
- Rhode Island International Film Festival (2017 Winner, Flickers' Youth Film Jury Award, Best Feature, Best Feature Film Narrative)
- Santa Barbara International Film Festival (2017 Nominee, Panavision Spirit Award for Independent Cinema)
- Seattle International Film Festival (2017 Nominee, New American Cinema Competition)
- Southside Film Festival, US (2017 Nominee, Jury Prize, Best Film)
- Top Indie Film Awards (2018 Winner, Best Feature, Best Editing) (Nominee, Best Director, Best Writing)
