= 2016 Los Angeles Film Critics Association Awards =

Annual US film awards ceremony

42nd LAFCA Awards
- Date: December 4, 2016

Highlights
- Best Picture: Moonlight

The 42nd Los Angeles Film Critics Association Awards, given by the Los Angeles Film Critics Association (LAFCA), honored the best in film for 2016.

== Winners ==
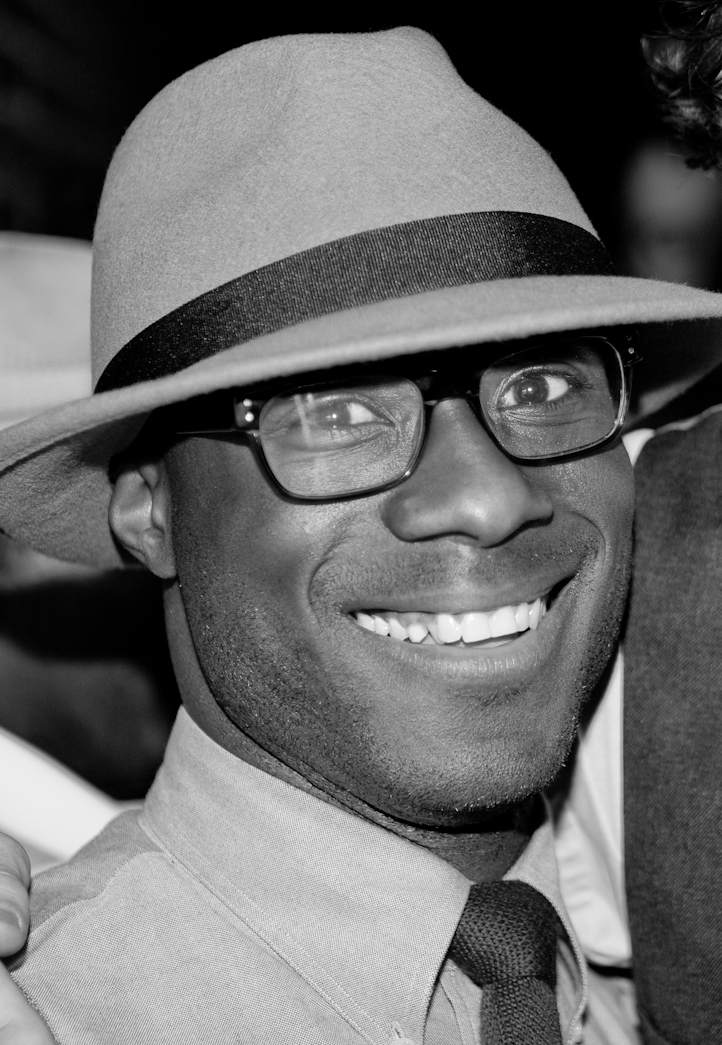
Barry Jenkins, Best Director winner

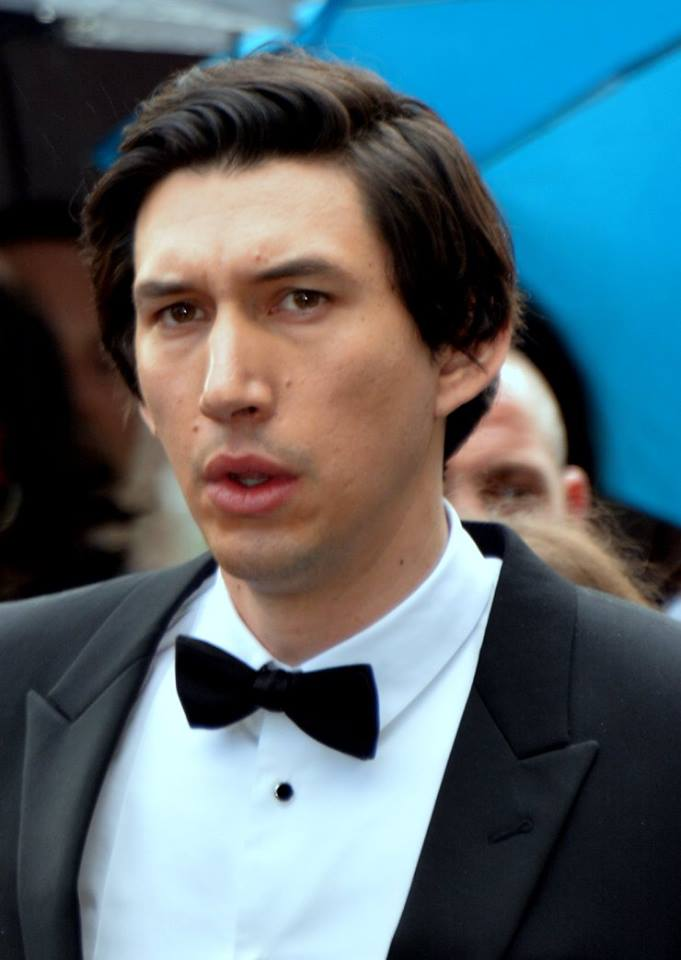
Adam Driver, Best Actor winner

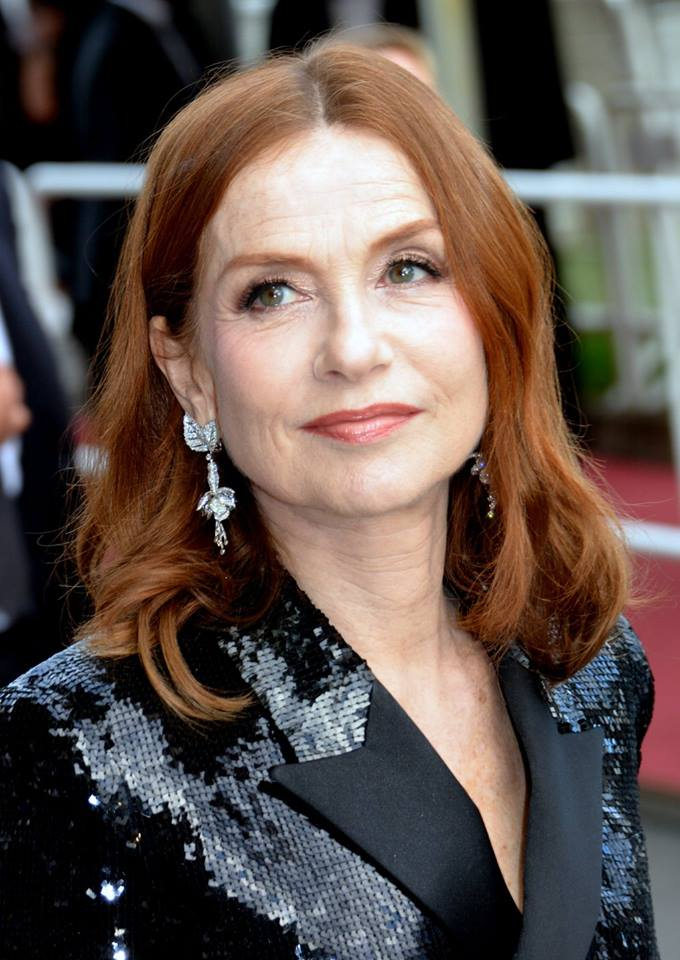
Isabelle Huppert, Best Actress winner

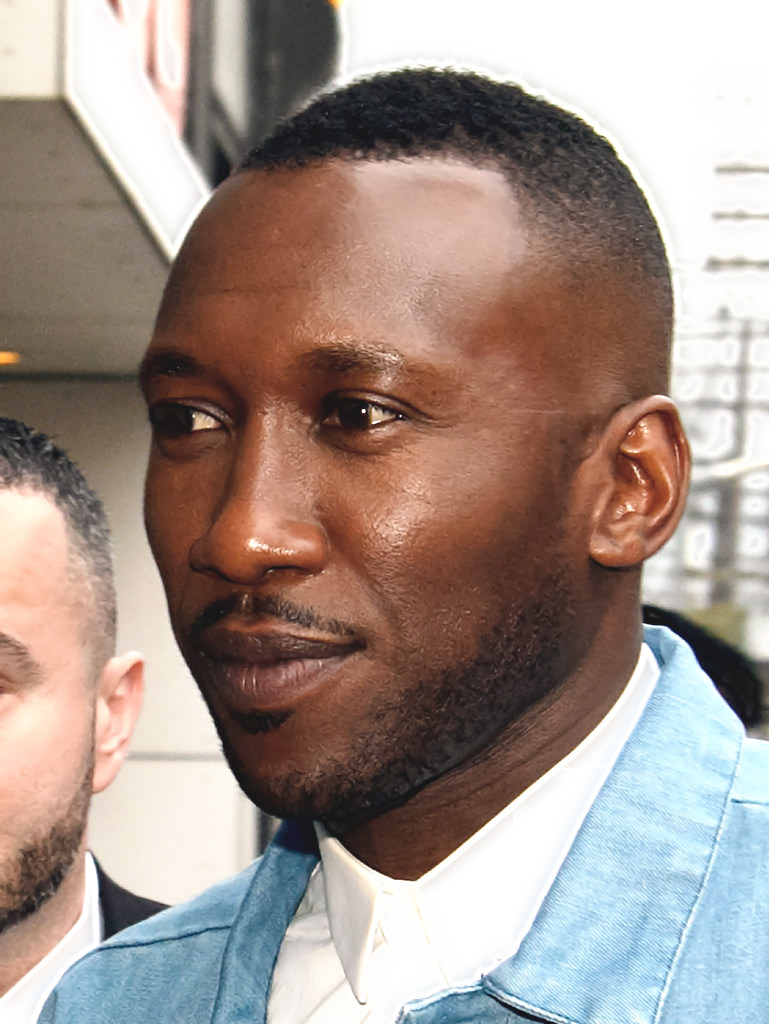
Mahershala Ali, Best Supporting Actor winner

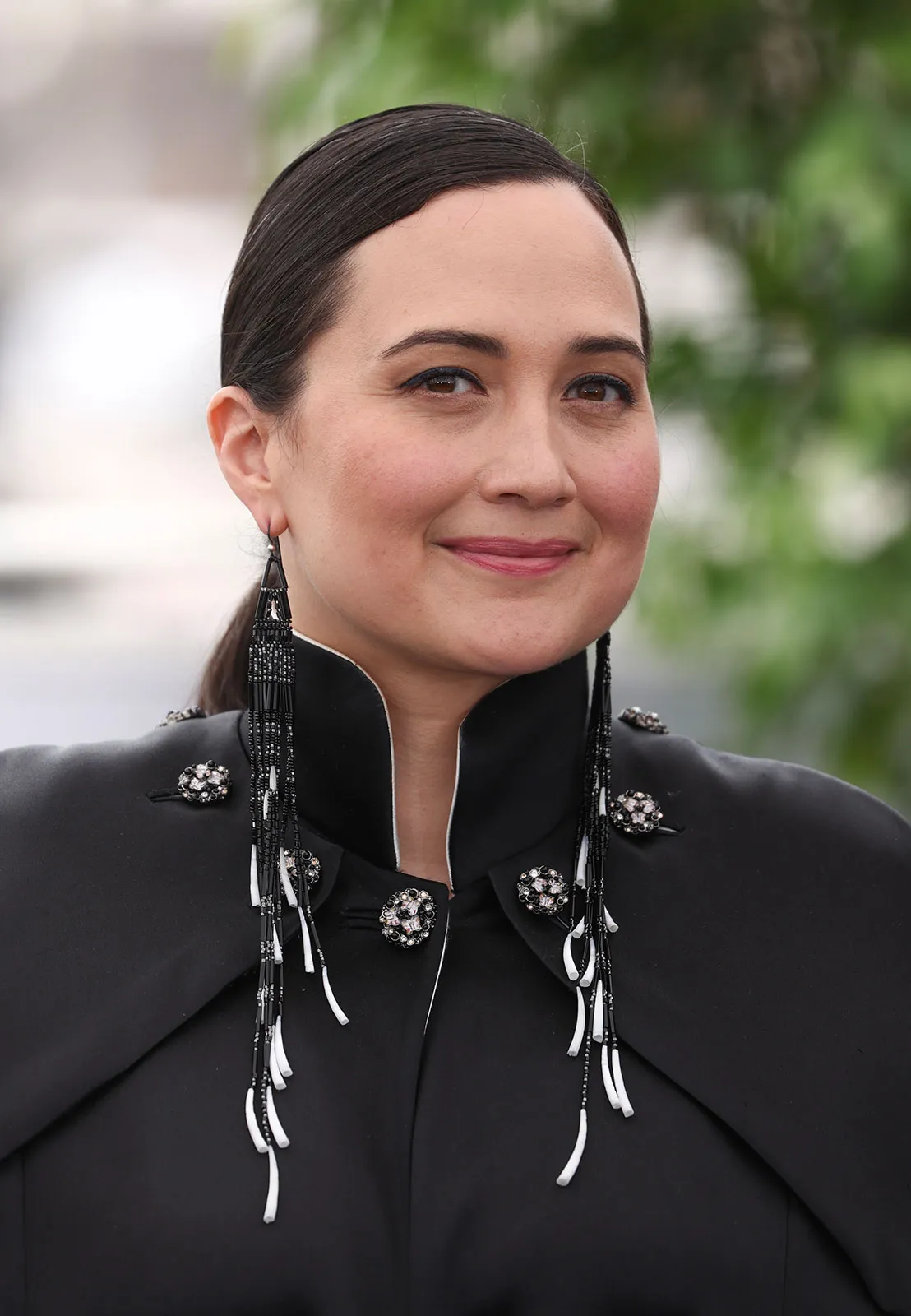
Lily Gladstone, Best Supporting Actress winner

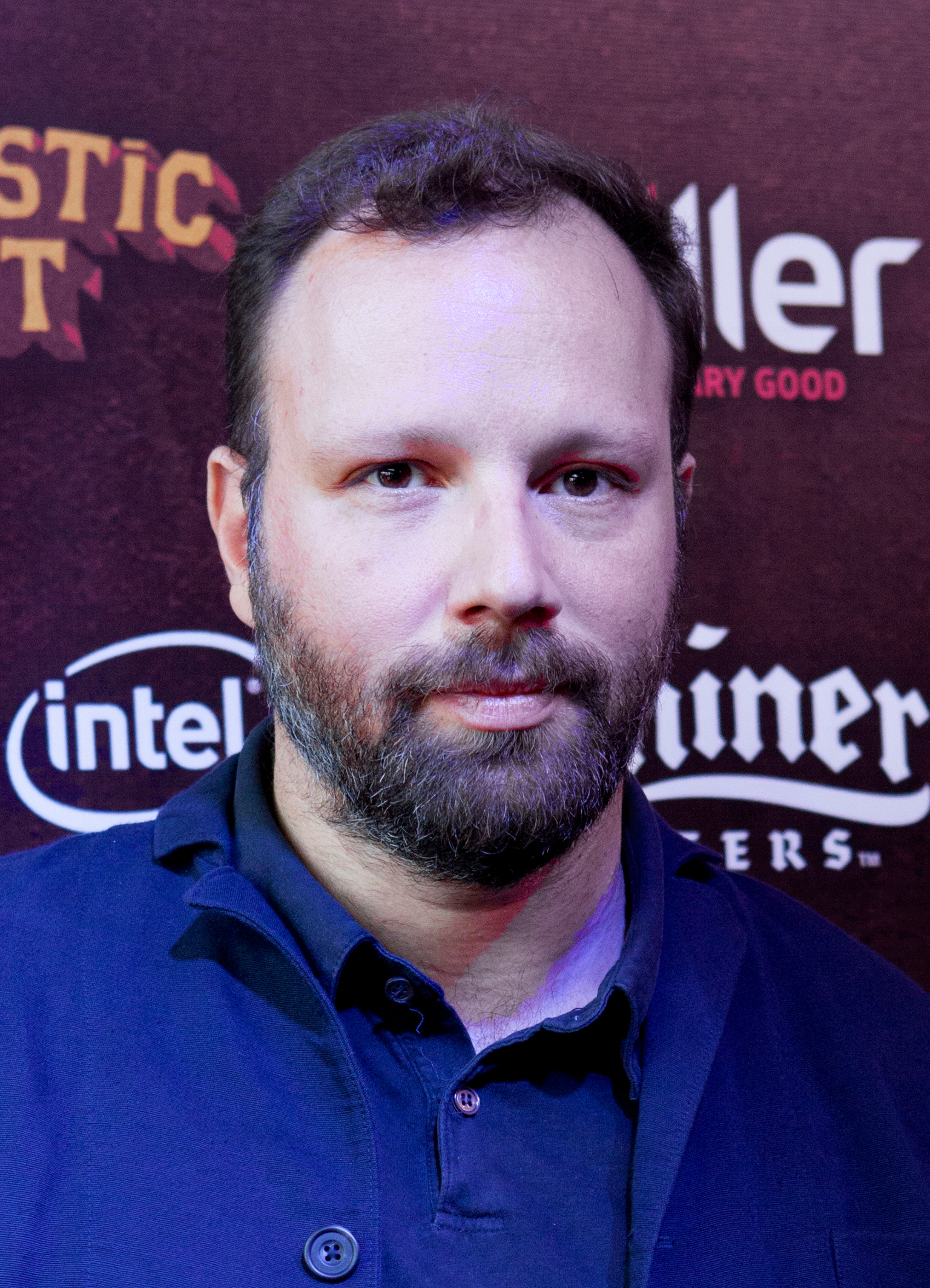
Yorgos Lanthimos, Best Screenplay co-winner

- Best Picture:
  - Moonlight
    - Runner-up: La La Land
- Best Director:
  - Barry Jenkins – Moonlight
    - Runner-up: Damien Chazelle – La La Land
- Best Actor:
  - Adam Driver – Paterson
    - Runner-up: Casey Affleck – Manchester by the Sea
- Best Actress:
  - Isabelle Huppert – Elle and Things to Come
    - Runner-up: Rebecca Hall – Christine
- Best Supporting Actor:
  - Mahershala Ali – Moonlight
    - Runner-up: Issey Ogata – Silence
- Best Supporting Actress:
  - Lily Gladstone – Certain Women
    - Runner-up: Michelle Williams – Manchester by the Sea
- Best Screenplay:
  - Yorgos Lanthimos and Efthimis Filippou – The Lobster
    - Runner-up: Kenneth Lonergan – Manchester by the Sea
- Best Cinematography:
  - James Laxton – Moonlight
    - Runner-up: Linus Sandgren – La La Land
- Best Editing:
  - Bret Granato, Maya Mumma, and Ben Sozanski – O.J.: Made in America
    - Runner-up: Tom Cross – La La Land
- Best Production Design:
  - Ryu Seong-hee – The Handmaiden
    - Runner-up: David Wasco – La La Land
- Best Music Score:
  - Justin Hurwitz, Benj Pasek, and Justin Paul – La La Land
    - Runner-up: Mica Levi – Jackie
- Best Foreign Language Film:
  - The Handmaiden • South Korea
    - Runner-up: Toni Erdmann • Germany
- Best Documentary/Non-Fiction Film:
  - I Am Not Your Negro
    - Runner-up: O.J.: Made in America
- Best Animation:
  - Your Name
    - Runner-up: The Red Turtle
- New Generation Award:
  - Trey Edward Shults and Krisha Fairchild – Krisha
- Career Achievement Award:
  - Shirley MacLaine
- The Douglas Edwards Experimental/Independent Film/Video Award:
  - Deborah Stratman – The Illinois Parables
- Special Citation:
  - Turner Classic Movies
