= Creep (franchise) =

Media franchise

- Official franchise logo
- Starring: Mark Duplass; Various actors (See below)
- Production companies: Blumhouse Productions; Duplass Brothers Productions
- Distributed by: The Orchard; Netflix; Shudder
- Country: United States
- Language: English

The Creep franchise is a found footage satirical psychological horror series consisting of two streaming exclusive and video on demand feature films and a television series. Starring and created by Patrick Brice and Mark Duplass, the series centers around a serial killer who regularly posts listings for one-time videography job assistance, to lure in his victims; after which he saves their created video in his personal vault and assumes their name as an alias.

The movies were created with a shoe-string budget and released in collaboration with Netflix. The first installment has since been called a horror cult classic. Its sequel was similarly praised. The television series has been mostly well-received and considered a fitting expansion of the films.

== Films ==
Film	U.S. release date	Director	Screenwriters	Producers
Creep	June 23, 2015	Patrick Brice	Patrick Brice & Mark Duplass	Mark Duplass and Jason Blum
Creep 2	October 24, 2017	Patrick Brice	Patrick Brice & Mark Duplass	Jason Blum and Carolyn Craddock

=== Creep (2014) ===
A videographer named Aaron responds to a request on Craigslist for one-day freelance project, requested by a man named Josef. The latter is suffering from terminal cancer, and states that he wishes to document his last days for his pregnant wife and the baby who is soon to be born. Collaborating in a remote location within the mountains the pair experience a friendly exchange. Aaron does his best to capture Josef's request, but witnesses some strange behavior in the process. Ignoring these idiosyncrasies at first, Aaron soon realizes that Josef fabricated his story to lure in an unsuspecting victim for his murderous plans. Realizing the truth, he must fight for survival by escaping the isolated location and Josef's ill-intentions.

=== Creep 2 (2017) ===
Aaron, a notorious serial killer who has taken on his alias from his favorite victim Aaron, finds himself dissatisfied with his recent murders and determines to try something different. Through another online job-for-hire advertisement, he lures a YouTube journalist named Sara to a remote cabin. Upon her arrival, he admits to previous murders and states that he wants to document his confessions on camera. To his surprise, Sara doubts his story but takes on the project. Explaining that she believes the experience will increase the followers of her unsuccessful web series where she details encounters with eccentric men she meets online, the pair begin their experience together. Throughout the day Josef / "Aaron" begins his usual tactics by attempting to horrify Sara, but repeatedly fails to have any impact. After staging his own hanging, "Aaron" explains his admiration for her, and the pair begin to fall in love.

=== Future ===
In June 2015, in collaboration Blum, Brice, and Duplass stated that there would be various "stories of Creep". In October 2017, Duplass confirmed that there were discussions ongoing for additional installments; pointing to the scene at the end of the first movie where the audience is shown the killer's collection of videos about each of his victims, stating: "I want to see each and every one of those tapes." Later that month, he also stated that creatives may repurpose some of the stories that were created during the process of writing Creep 2. In a separate interview, the writer/producer/actor stated that the creatives involved are interested in creating a prequel, which would vaguely detail how Josef became a serial killer; while also stating that there will be a projects that explore the various victims teased at the end of the first film. That same month, Brice stated that one of the concepts that was explored for Creep 2 included the revelation that Josef is the leader of a cult group, while acknowledging the possibility of this abandoned plot-point being revisited.

In November 2017, Brice stated that the realization of a third movie, exploring Josef's and Sara's reunion and further love story, depends on the success of Creep 2. By March 2020, Duplass confirmed that a third movie is in development. Recalling that he and Brice both felt like the second movie wasn't as good as they had wanted it to be, he stated that the current script has been written twice because they want to ensure the story is worth telling. In January 2024, Brice stated that while writing for a third film is ongoing, he and Duplass had been busy with their various respective production schedules. While discussing the plans for additional installments, the filmmaker confirmed that Josef's troubled childhood including the character's creation of the wolf-masked alias referred to as "Peachfuzz" would be explored. By September of the same year, Duplass expressed interest in portraying the titular villain for years to come, while acknowledging that there are plans for additional stories following the events of The Creep Tapes.

In October 2025, Patrick Brice stated that the project will be made once the television series is completed, with the possible third film serving as the finale to the franchise.

== Television ==
Series	Season(s)	Episodes	Originally released			Showrunner	Executive producers	Status
Series	Season(s)	Episodes	First released	Last released	Network	Showrunner	Executive producers	Status
The Creep Tapes	1	6	November 15, 2024	December 13, 2024	Shudder, AMC+	Mark Duplass	Mark Duplass, and Patrick Brice	Released
The Creep Tapes	2	6	November 14, 2025	December 12, 2025	Shudder, AMC+	Mark Duplass	Mark Duplass, and Patrick Brice	Released
The Creep Tapes	3	6	September 15, 2026	September 29, 2026	Shudder, AMC+	Mark Duplass	Mark Duplass, and Patrick Brice	Released

=== The Creep Tapes (2024–present) ===
In June 2024, it was announced that a six-episode Creep television series had wrapped production. Mark Duplass reprised his role as the main antagonist, in addition to writing and executive producing the series with Patrick Brice, who directed each episode. The duo explained that while they have worked on various continuations of the franchise, their own perception that the second movie was inferior to the original made them hesitant to continue until they determined the story they wanted to tell. The plot of each episode depicts one of Josef's previous victims, through the video recordings he saved as depicted at the end of the first film. The Creep Tapes premiered on the streaming services Shudder and AMC+ on November 15, 2024 with a two-part premiere; the series continued to air weekly on Fridays. In February 2025, the series was renewed for a second season. In October of the same year, it was renewed for a third season.

== Main cast and characters ==
List indicators

This section includes characters who will appear or have appeared in the franchise in main roles.

- An empty grey cell indicates the character was not in the film, or that the character's official presence has not yet been confirmed.
- ^{A} indicates an appearance through archival footage or audio.
- ^{V} indicates a voice-only role.

Character	Film		Television		
Character	Creep	Creep 2	The Creep Tapes		
Character	Creep	Creep 2	Season 1	Season 2	Season 3
Character	2015	2017	2024	2025	2026
Josef or Peachfuzz "Jeff Daniels" / "Father Tom Durkin" / "Kyle" / "Trip Engold" / "David" / "Timmy" / "Randy" / "David Beasley" / "Ralph" / "Archie"	Mark Duplass	Mark Duplass	Mark Duplass	Mark Duplass	Mark Duplass
Aaron Franklin	Patrick Brice	Patrick Brice^{A}	Mentioned/Referenced	Mentioned/Referenced	Mentioned/Referenced
Angela	Katie Aselton^{V}			Katie Aselton	
Sara		Desiree Akhavan		Mentioned/Referenced	
Mike			Mike Luciano		
Elliot			David Nordstrom	Mentioned/Referenced	David Nordstrom
Jeremy			Josh Fadem		
Brad Branson			Josh Ruben		
Brandt			Scott Pitts		
Mom			Krisha Fairchild	Mentioned/Referenced	Mentioned/Referenced
Albert			John Craven		
"Joseph"				David Dastmalchian	
Wes				Diego Josef	
Officer Maher				Desean Terry	
Officer				Alex Bewkes	
Mark				Robert Longstreet	
Ava				Taylor Garron	
Nick Green				Timm Sharp	
Crystal					Kate Siegel
Mo					James Earl
Anisha					Rekha Shankar
Connor					Jeffery Self
Greg					Nicholas Hamilton
Brie					Ora Duplass
Jody					Elliott Fullam

== Additional production and crew details ==
Title	Crew/Detail					
Title	Composer(s)	Cinematographer(s)	Editor	Production companies	Distributing companies	Running time
Creep	Kyle Field & Eric Andrew Kuhn	Patrick Brice	Christopher Donlon	Blumhouse Productions, Duplass Brothers Productions	The Orchard, Netflix	1 hr 17 mins
Creep 2	Julian Wass	Patrick Brice & Desiree Akhavan	Christopher Donlon	Blumhouse Productions, Duplass Brothers Productions, Netflix Original Films	The Orchard, Netflix	1 hr 20 mins
The Creep Tapes	Julian Wass	Patrick Brice	Christopher Donlon	Duplass Brothers Productions	Shudder	19-27 minutes (per episode)

== Development ==
=== Creep ===
Co-written by Mark Duplass and Patrick Brice, the project evolved from its original conception into the story which was realized as Creep. Duplass based premise in-part, on a real-life experience he had while living in New York. While responding to a listing on Craigslist, he was surprised with how quickly the seller began telling him their personal experiences through their tears, and repeatedly invaded his own personal space. Perplexed by how rapidly they perceived a closeness to him, he found himself thinking that if he didn't get out of there something bad may happen to him. The filmmakers created the franchise with a few questions in mind: Why do we inherently trust people that we shouldn’t trust? Why is it that we put an ad in the paper and let a stranger walk into our home without knowing anything about them? That story is so exciting and so interesting. For fear of being rude, or offending people, we don’t protect ourselves. And that feels big to us. Determined to create a movie together immediately, the duo began principal photography in 2012 where the initial cut was completed within five days and they were the two-person crew; their initial perception being that the film may never see a wide release. Depending on which character was the focus on camera at the time, Brice and Duplass both handled the cinematography as well as direction responsibilities during those scenes (though Brice received sole credit as director). Duplass continued mentoring Brice throughout the process, as this was the latter's directorial debut as well as his first experience acting. The duo improvised the lines of the movie, from a basic outline they've described as a "scriptment". The original scriptment titled "Peachfuzz", and was intended to be a arthouse character-study regarding interpersonal relationships with a use of dark humor. After various test screenings with limited viewers, however, the audiences continued to connect with the thriller aspects of the story, and their repeated feedback requested more emphasis on the scary aspects of the film.

This process continued and progressed when Jason Blum, was shown a rough cut of the movie. Duplass and Blum, had initially met in 2005 when they were both making drama films and had resolved at that time to work together in the future. After Blum had released Paranormal Activity, Brice and Duplass optioned the movie to him. Blum stated that 99 percent of the projects that are pitched to his studio as a found footage horror, he encourages the respective filmmaker to develop the script through other filming techniques instead. After watching their project however, Blum agreed to join the production, telling Duplass: "All found-footage movies come to me, and they all suck, and this one doesn't, I want to help." Responding positively to the project, he explained that he receives at least one pitch for a found-footage movie per week, because "[found-footage is] easy to make but very hard to make well." Becoming involved with redeveloping the project, the producer assisted particularly with restructuring the story's ending where the project was ultimately finalized as a horror film. With the successful producer as a part of the production, reshoots took place over a total of eighteen months with an additional crew member added. Meanwhile, the marketing team at Blumhouse Productions were tasked with portraying the project as a horror story, through its various advertising mediums. Blum later explained their collaboration on the project: "I come from the business side and Mark comes from the creative side, but every time a decision came up about Creep it was two emails, and we agreed. I’ve not had that ever with someone on the creative or the business side." As production continued, they received a distribution offer through Universal Pictures which would have seen a theatrical wide release. Through the distribution rights, it was requested that the project evolve into a trilogy, with contractual obligations from Brice and Duplass to create the sequels. Due to the $20,000,000 marketing costs this would have required, however, the duo opted to maintain the self-contained individual movie they had created and worked with Netflix distribution instead; explaining that this option allowed them to earn a monetary profit in the process.

=== Creep 2 ===
Following the movie's streaming release Brice explained that though they initially had zero intention of developing sequels, the final ending which was developed with Blum's assistance "opens the world a bit" as the audiences sees Josef's cabinet full of VHS tapes and video recordings of his previous victims. The filmmaker stated that The Texas Chain Saw Massacre (1974) and Halloween (1978), had been influential to his perceptions of horror early in his career. Netflix approached Brice and Duplass with the option to produce a sequel, citing the large viewership numbers which were not made public as the company's motivation. As the streaming service offered to provide a larger budget, Brice and Duplass developed a sequel while intentionally keeping the story small-scale similar to the first movie; though the concept was inspired by the 1990s slasher movie revival, with influences from Scream (1996), I Know What You Did Last Summer, and Urban Legend. Brice explained that four iterations of the script for the sequel were developed, before its current iteration was finalized. Explaining the writing processes, Brice stated that he and Duplass worked to create a similar slow-burn approach to the sequel's story, while acknowledgeding that they struggled with which story to produce, citing their combined fears of creating a poor sequel. The duo ultimately resolved that while the original movie had a psychological-thriller aspect where the story involved a protagonist questioning whether Josef was psychotic, or a harmless yet weird creep, before it's revealed to the audience that he is indeed a killer; the sequel was given a premise where the villain declares that he is a serial killer upfront, but his this potential-victim initially doesn't believe his claims, only to have a self-realization what has been going on all along by the end of the story. Principal photography was completed over six days in Los Angeles with a production crew consisting of five people.

== Reception ==
=== Financial details ===
Film	Box office worldwide gross	Total home video sales	Worldwide gross total income	Budget	Worldwide net total income	Ref.
Creep	—N/a	Information not publicly available	Information not publicly available	$500	Information not publicly available	
Creep 2	—N/a	Information not publicly available	Information not publicly available	>$500	Information not publicly available	

=== Critical response ===
Critical and public response of Creep films
Film	Rotten Tomatoes	Metacritic
Creep	91% (35 reviews)	74/100 (6 reviews)
Creep 2	100% (29 reviews)	75/100 (5 reviews)

Critical and public response of Creep series
Series	Season	Rotten Tomatoes	Metacritic
The Creep Tapes	1	77% (13 reviews)	55/100 (5 reviews)
The Creep Tapes	2	100% (7 reviews)	—N/a
