= 2016 New York Film Critics Circle Awards =

82nd New York Film Critics Circle Awards

82nd NYFCC Awards

January 3, 2017

Best Picture:
La La Land

The 82nd New York Film Critics Circle Awards, honoring the best in film for 2016, were announced on December 1, 2016 and presented on January 3, 2017.

== Winners ==
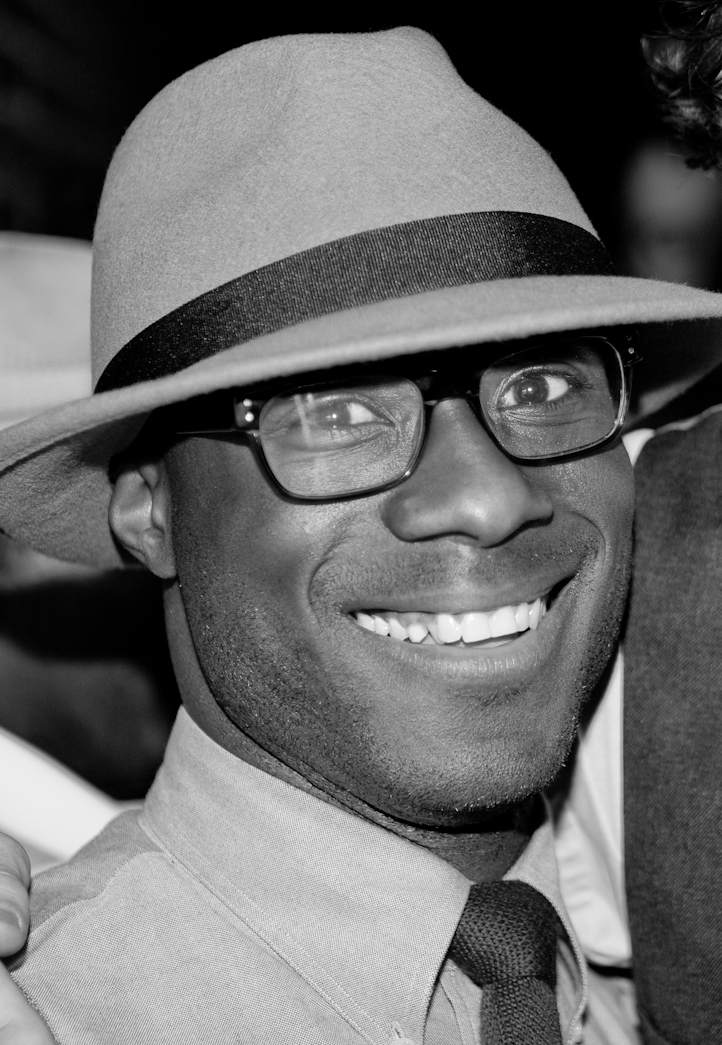
Barry Jenkins, Best Director winner

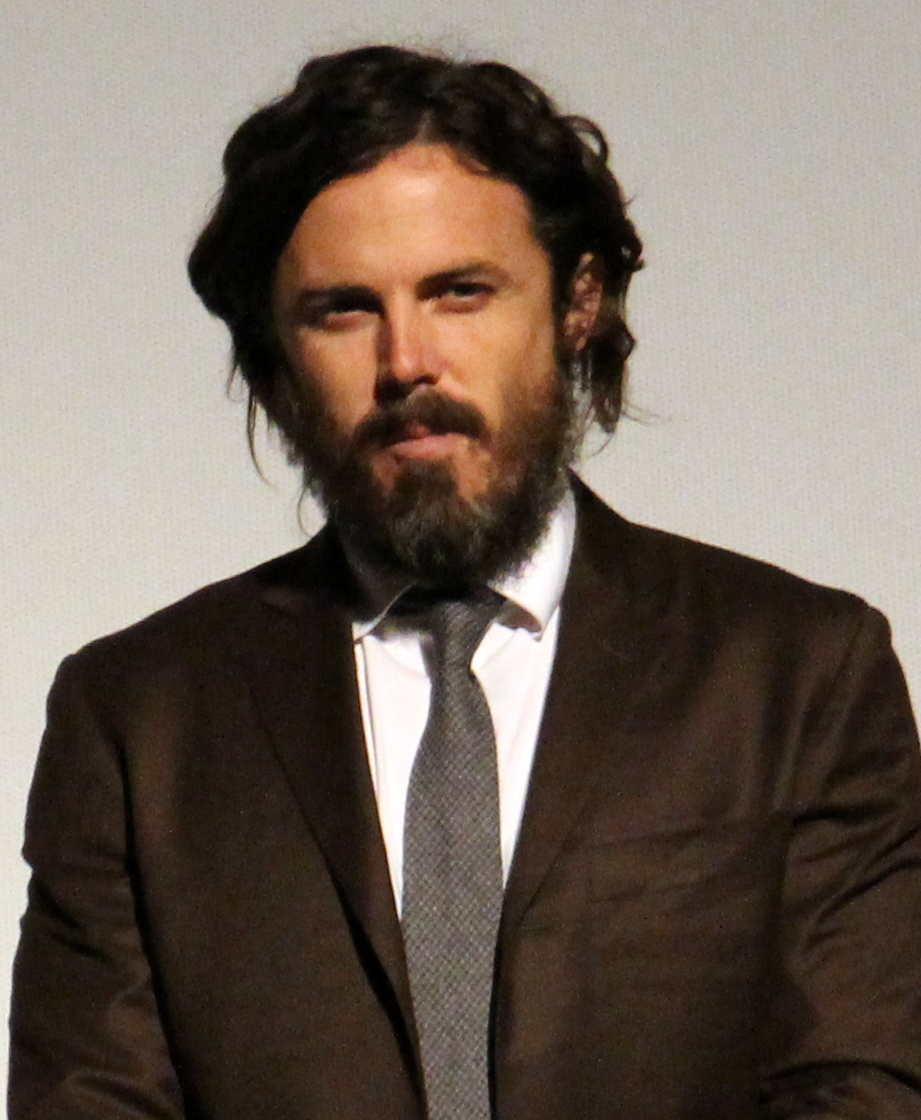
Casey Affleck, Best Actor winner

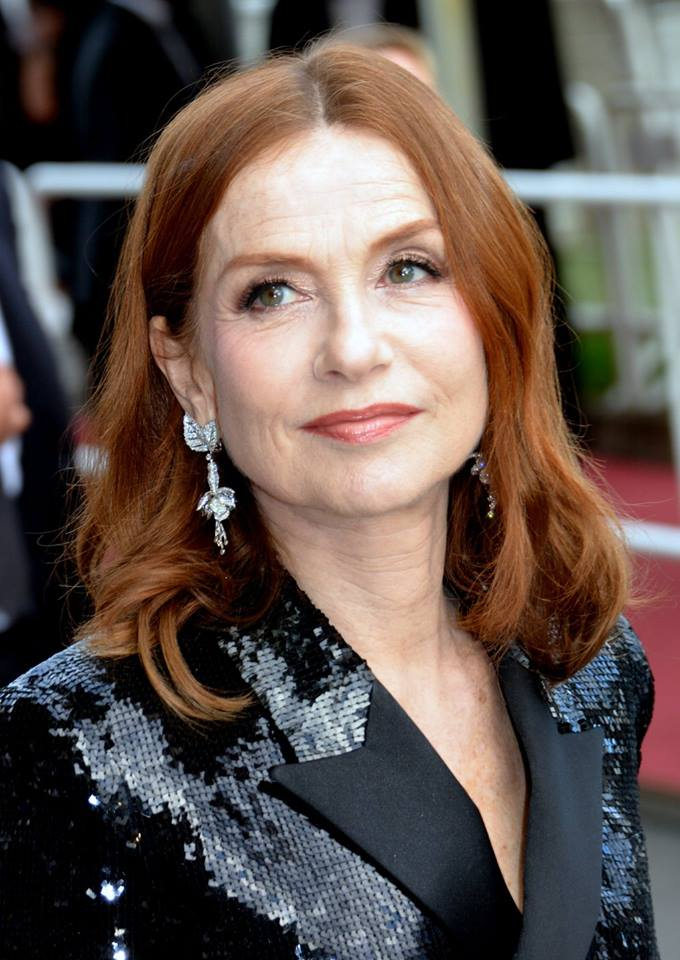
Isabelle Huppert, Best Actress winner

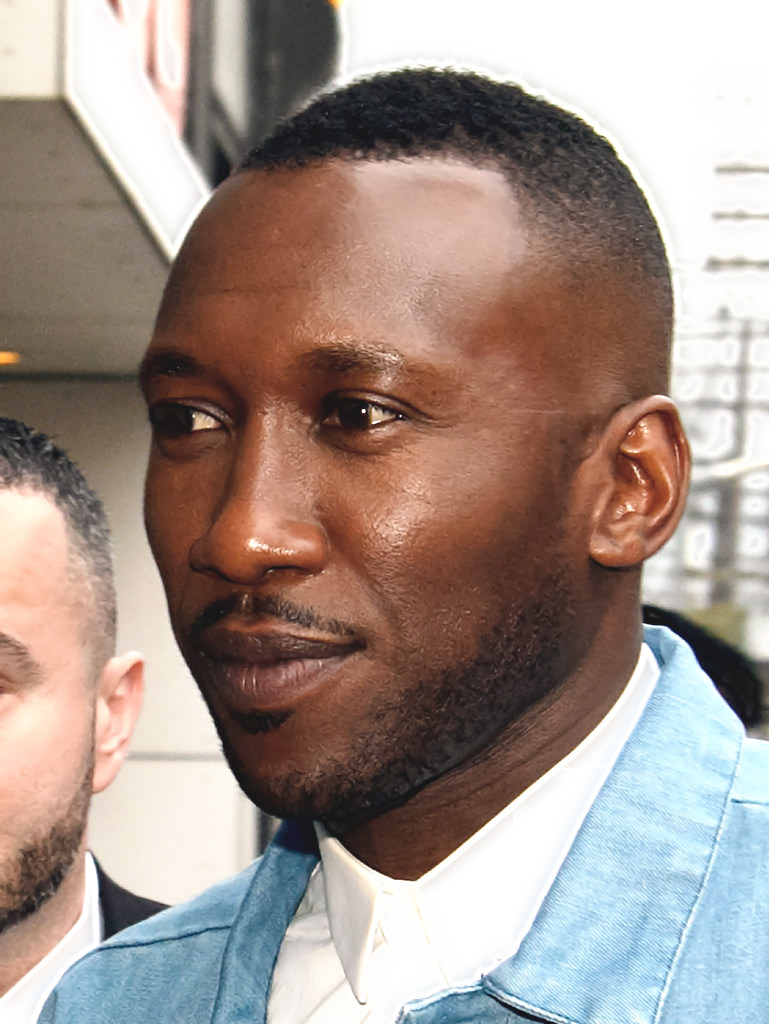
Mahershala Ali, Best Supporting Actor winner

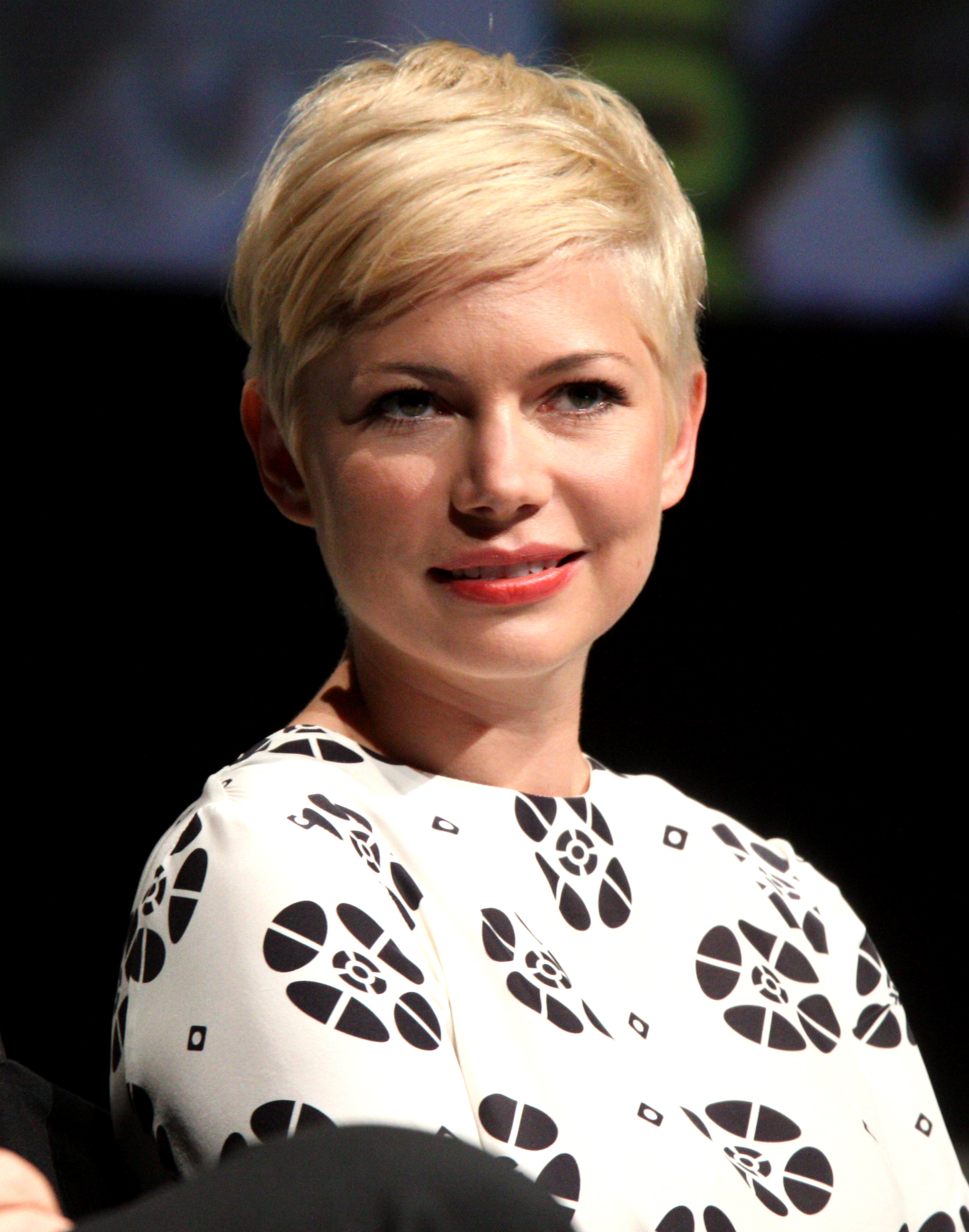
Michelle Williams, Best Supporting Actress winner

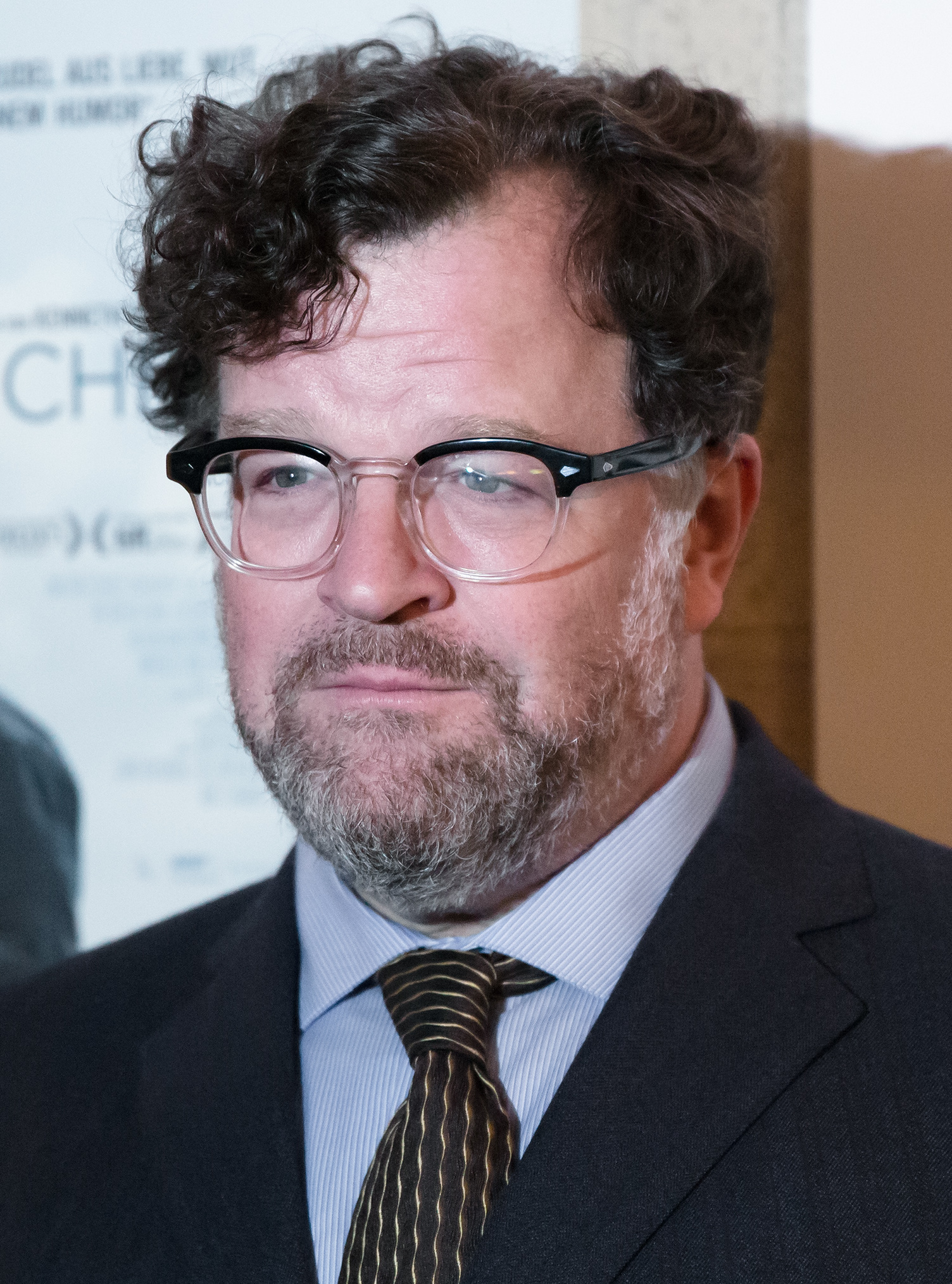
Kenneth Lonergan, Best Screenplay winner

- Best Film:
  - La La Land
- Best Director:
  - Barry Jenkins – Moonlight
- Best Actor:
  - Casey Affleck – Manchester by the Sea
- Best Actress:
  - Isabelle Huppert – Elle and Things to Come
- Best Supporting Actor:
  - Mahershala Ali – Moonlight
- Best Supporting Actress:
  - Michelle Williams – Certain Women and Manchester by the Sea
- Best Screenplay:
  - Kenneth Lonergan – Manchester by the Sea
- Best Animated Film:
  - Zootopia
- Best Cinematography:
  - James Laxton – Moonlight
- Best Non-Fiction Film:
  - O.J.: Made in America
- Best Foreign Language Film:
  - Toni Erdmann • Germany
- Best First Film:
  - Kelly Fremon Craig – The Edge of Seventeen (TIE)
  - Trey Edward Shults – Krisha (TIE)
- Special Award:
  - Julie Dash and Thelma Schoonmaker
