= American Folk =

- Theatrical release poster
- Directed by: David Heinz
- Written by: David Heinz
- Produced by: Fiona Walsh Heinz; Matt Miller
- Starring: Joe Purdy; Amber Rubarth; Krisha Fairchild; David Fine; Bruce Beatty; Elizabeth Dennehy
- Cinematography: Devin Whetstone
- Edited by: David Heinz
- Music by: Ben Lovett
- Production company: Vanishing Angle
- Distributed by: Good Deed Entertainment
- Release dates: February 3, 2017 (SBIFF); January 26, 2018 (United States)
- Running time: 99 minutes
- Country: United States
- Language: English

American Folk is a 2017 American drama film written and directed by David Heinz. The film stars Joe Purdy, Amber Rubarth, Krisha Fairchild, David Fine, Bruce Beatty and Elizabeth Dennehy. The film was released on January 26, 2018, by Good Deed Entertainment. It follows the story of two strangers, both folk musicians stranded in California, who take a road trip to New York in the days after the September 11 attacks.

== Cast ==
- Joe Purdy as Elliott
- Amber Rubarth as Joni
- Krisha Fairchild as Scottie
- David Fine as Dale
- Bruce Beatty as Mike
- Elizabeth Dennehy as Ann
- Miranda LaDawn Hill as Bianca
- Emma Thatcher as Emily
- Holger Moncada Jr. as Alejandro
- Julian Gopal as Carlos
- Paul White as Fargo
- Shelly West as Kelly
- Maryann Strossner as Kathryn

== Release ==
Originally titled 'SEPTEMBER 12TH' the film premiered at the Santa Barbara International Film Festival on February 3, 2017, and won the Best American Independent award at the Cleveland International Film Festival in April 2017. On May 16, 2017, Good Deed Entertainment acquired distribution rights to the film. The film was released into theaters on January 26, 2018, by Good Deed Entertainment.

== Reception ==
The film has a fresh rating of 77% on Rotten Tomatoes, with Katie Walsh of the Los Angeles Times saying "The songs are lovely, and the first-time actors give performances that grow warmer as the film progresses," and Romantic Intentions Quarterly calling it "a gentle, undulating movie, much like the scenery – and, often, music – it so gorgeously showcases." In contrast, Christopher Kompanek of The Washington Post gave the film a negative review, saying "... the songs lend the film an emotional resonance that the forced dialogue often struggles to achieve."
