= Krisha =

- Theatrical release poster
- Directed by: Trey Edward Shults
- Written by: Trey Edward Shults
- Based on: Krisha by Trey Edward Shults
- Produced by: Justin R. Chan; Chase Joliet; Trey Edward Shults; Wilson Smith
- Starring: Krisha Fairchild; Robyn Fairchild; Bill Wise
- Cinematography: Drew Daniels
- Edited by: Trey Edward Shults
- Music by: Brian McOmber
- Distributed by: A24
- Release dates: March 16, 2015 (SXSW); March 18, 2016 (United States)
- Running time: 81 minutes
- Country: United States
- Language: English
- Budget: $30,000
- Box office: $144,822

Krisha is a 2015 American psychological drama film written, directed and edited by Trey Edward Shults in his feature-length directorial debut, starring his real-life aunt Krisha Fairchild, Robyn Fairchild, and Bill Wise, and is the feature-length adaption of the 2014 short film Krisha also directed by Shults. It tells the story of a troubled old lady with a history of addiction who struggles to reconnect with her estranged kids and family members during the Thanksgiving season.

It received the Grand Jury Award and Audience Award in the narrative feature competition at the 2015 South by Southwest Film Festival. It was selected to compete in the Critics' Week section at the 2015 Cannes Film Festival. The film was released in a limited release on March 18, 2016, by A24.

== Plot ==
Krisha, a troubled woman in her sixties with a history of addiction, has been estranged from her family for many years; her son, Trey, was raised by her sister, Robyn, for large parts of his life. Krisha has recently told her relatives that she is now reformed and sober, and that she wants to visit on Thanksgiving Day and cook dinner for the whole extended family. The movie starts with Krisha arriving at her sister's large house, where many family members are gathered, and greets them all warmly.

Krisha attempts to reconcile with Trey, expressing a desire to be part of his life again. He is cold and defensive, refusing even to look at her. As she attempts to coax a reaction out of him, he resists and leaves.

As the day progresses, it becomes clear that the family has clashing opinions of Krisha. While some, like Robyn, believe Krisha has turned her life around, others, including her brother-in-law, Doyle, remain skeptical and deride her assurances that she is sober. On Thanksgiving morning, Krisha's elderly mother arrives and is introduced to the newer members of the family. Although she is forgetful, she remembers each of the family members by name; upon being greeted by Krisha, however, she becomes confused and seems unable to remember her clearly. Krisha is visibly upset by this.

As the day progresses and she sees her son's closeness to her sister's family, Krisha starts to secretly return to her bathroom to abuse alcohol, prescription drugs, and illegal drugs in an attempt to cope. When it is time to remove the roasted turkey from the oven, she is drunk and out-of-control. She spills the roasting tray and the perfectly roasted turkey lands on the kitchen floor. Most of the family is horrified and tries to help Krisha up from the floor and salvage the meal. Doyle only looks on and laughs.

Krisha returns to her room and watches home videos Robyn has of Trey as a child. Waking from a stupor, she calls her boyfriend and leaves him a furious voicemail, telling him that she relied on him for support and that he abandoned her when she needed him. She then goes downstairs to find the rest of the family enjoying a toned-down version of Thanksgiving dinner without her. Robyn refuses to allow her to join the table and takes her out of the room. Robyn laments the fact that Krisha lied about her sobriety, telling Krisha that she defended her when other members of the family didn't want to invite her at all. Later, after looking through Trey's room and finding a bottle of vodka, a distraught and increasingly unhinged Krisha interrupts dinner once again, demanding that Trey tell her he loves her. When Robyn asks her to leave and Trey disowns her, the argument escalates and becomes violent, with Krisha breaking silverware and attacking Robyn as she is removed from the house. The film ends with an abrupt shot of Krisha looking into the camera, trying and failing to hold back tears.

== Cast ==
- Krisha Fairchild as Krisha
- Robyn Fairchild as Robyn
- Chris Doubek as Dr. Becker
- Billie Fairchild as Grandma
- Bill Wise as Doyle
- Trey Edward Shults as Trey
- Olivia Grace Applegate as Briana
- Bryan Casserly as Logan
- Victoria Fairchild as Vicky
- Atheena Frizzell as Atheena
- Augustine Frizzell as Augustine
- Chase Joliet as Chase
- Rose Nelson as Rose

== Production ==
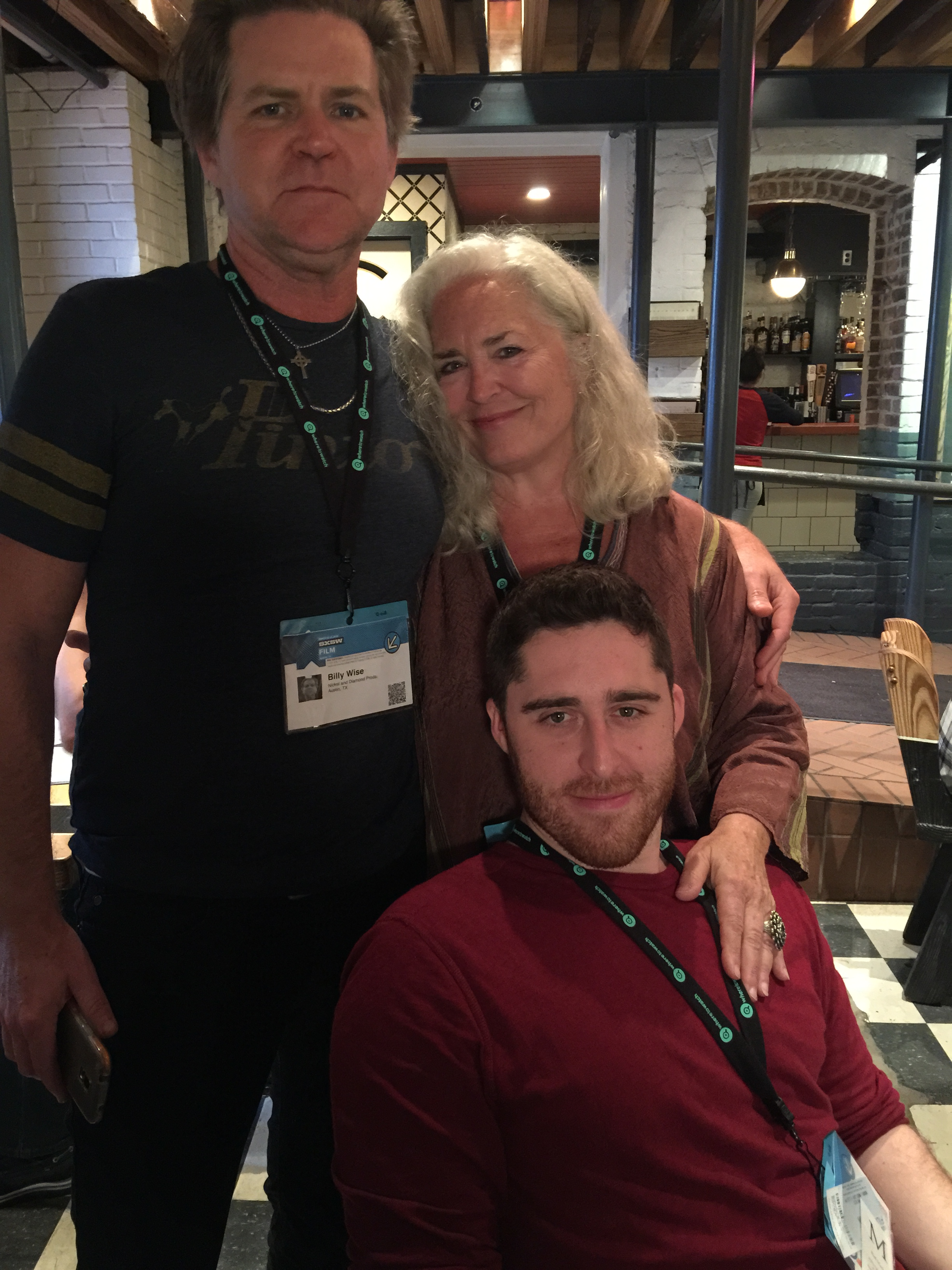
Bill Wise, Krisha Fairchild and Trey Edward Shults

The film is based on a short film of the same name which also starred Fairchild in the titular role of Krisha. Many of the film's cast are relatives of Shults, including Krisha Fairchild who is Shults' aunt, his mother and grandmother, and other actors being friends of Shults. Bill Wise and Chris Doubek were the only non-relatives or friends cast in the film. A Kickstarter.com campaign was created to fund the film. A $10,000 goal was set, which ended on July 20, 2014, with a total of $14,260 from 64 backers.

Principal photography began on August 2, 2014, and concluded on August 10, 2014. The film was shot over the course of nine days, and was filmed at Shults' parents' house.

== Release ==
The film had its world premiere at South by Southwest on March 16, 2015. The film had its international premiere at the Cannes Film Festival on May 20, 2015. Shortly after, A24 acquired U.S. distribution rights to the film. The film also went onto screen at the BFI London Film Festival on October 14, 2015. and the AFI Fest on November 7, 2015. The film was released in a limited release on March 18, 2016.

== Reception ==
=== Critical response ===
On review aggregator website Rotten Tomatoes, the film has an approval rating of 95% based on 79 reviews, with an average rating of 8.3/10. The site's critical consensus reads, "Raw, bracingly honest, and refreshingly unconventional, Krisha wrings fresh -- and occasionally uncomfortable -- truths from a seemingly familiar premise." On Metacritic, the film has a score of 86 out of 100, based on 31 critics, indicating "universal acclaim".

Justin Chang of Variety gave the film a positive review, considering "its stylistic experimentation anchored by a subtly wounding performance from Krisha Fairchild in the eponymous lead role. More festival berths await, and while commercial prospects look decidedly modest, critical support should spur select arthouse bookings and discerning-viewer interest ahead of VOD play." Sherri Linden of The Hollywood Reporter gave the film a positive review writing: "The story will eventually draw the viewer outside Krisha’s perspective, but the beauty of the film is that its compassion deepens along with its very real sense of horror — compassion not just for Krisha but for those who still love her or have given up on trying".

=== Accolades ===
List of awards and nominations
Award / Film festival	Category	Recipient(s)	Result	Ref.
Austin Film Critics Association	Best First Film	Krisha	Nominated	
Cannes Film Festival	The Nespresso Grand Prize	Krisha	Nominated	
Cannes Film Festival	Caméra d'Or	Trey Edward Shults	Nominated	
Deauville Film Festival	Grand Prix	Krisha	Nominated	
Deauville Film Festival	Prix de la Critique	Krisha	Won	
Detroit Film Critics Society	Best Breakthrough	Trey Edward Shults	Nominated	
Gotham Awards	Bingham Ray Breakthrough Director Award	Trey Edward Shults	Won	
Houston Film Critics Society	Texas Independent Film Award	Krisha	Nominated	
Independent Spirit Awards	John Cassavetes Award	Trey Edward Shults, Justin R. Chan, Chase Joliet, and Wilson Smith	Won	
Los Angeles Film Critics Association	New Generation Award	Trey Edward Shults and Krisha Fairchild	Won	
National Board of Review	Top Ten Independent Films	Krisha	Won	
National Board of Review	Best Directorial Debut	Trey Edward Shults	Won	
New York Film Critics Circle	Best First Film	Trey Edward Shults	Won (Note: Tied with Kelly Fremon Craig for The Edge of Seventeen)	
Reykjavík International Film Festival	FIPRESCI Prize	Trey Edward Shults	Won	
South by Southwest	Grand Jury Prize - Narrative Feature	Trey Edward Shults	Won	
South by Southwest	Audience Award - Narrative Feature	Trey Edward Shults	Won	
