= Deliver Us (film) =

2023 American horror film

- Theatrical release poster
- Directed by: Lee Roy Kunz; Cru Ennis
- Written by: Lee Roy Kunz; Kane Kunz
- Produced by: Cru Ennis; Lee Roy Kunz; Isaac Bauman
- Starring: Lee Roy Kunz; Maria Vera Ratti; Alexander Siddig; Jaune Kimmel; Thomas Kretschmann
- Cinematography: Isaac Bauman
- Edited by: David Walsh Heinz
- Music by: Tóti Guðnason
- Production company: World's Fair Pictures
- Distributed by: Magnet Releasing
- Release date: September 29, 2023 (United States)
- Running time: 102 minutes
- Country: United States
- Language: English
- Box office: $370,148

Deliver Us is a 2023 American religious horror film directed by Lee Roy Kunz and Cru Ennis, and written by Lee Roy and Kane Kunz. It stars Lee Roy Kunz, Maria Vera Ratti, Alexander Siddig, Jaune Kimmel, and Thomas Kretschmann. The film follows a woman who is about to give birth to twin boys, who will be born to be a Messiah and an Antichrist, respectively, based on ancient prophecy.

Deliver Us premiered at Popcorn Frights Film Festival on August 10, 2023, and was released in the United States by Magnet Releasing on September 29, 2023.

== Plot ==
Sister Yulia, a nun in a Russian convent, is pregnant with twins, who she claims to have been immaculately conceived, and who are prophesized to be the Messiah and the Antichrist, respectively. Father Fox and Cardinal Russo are sent to Saint Petersburg, and extract Yulia to Estonia when a sect called Vox Dei attempts to murder the babies. They take refuge at a remote estate belonging to Laura, the priest's fiancé, who he intends to marry after resigning from the Church. Several strange occurrences caused by the evil twin lead to the deaths of Laura and Cardinal Russo. Father Saul tries to murder the baby he believes to be the evil one, but is stopped by Yulia and Father Fox. Realizing they were meant to be a family, Fox and Yulia raise the twins as their own, in the hopes that the Messiah will have the strength to fight his brother when the time comes.

== Cast ==
- Lee Roy Kunz as Father Fox
- Maria Vera Ratti as Sister Yulia
- Alexander Siddig as Cardinal Russo
- Jaune Kimmel as Laura
- Thomas Kretschmann as Father Saul
- Lena Barbara Luhse as Sister Sniger

== Release ==
The film premiered at Popcorn Frights Film Festival on August 10, 2023. It was released in the United States on September 29, 2023.

=== Critical response ===
On the review aggregator website Rotten Tomatoes, 67% of 18 critics' reviews are positive, with an average rating of 6.0/10.

Simon Abrams of RogerEbert.com gave the film 3 stars out of 4 stars and he wrote: "Grey, the color of winter frost, dimmer-switch lighting, and moody cinematography. "Deliver Us," a loopy "The Omen"-style Antichrist horror-thriller, is also grey. Just look at the movie's poster and trailer. Grey isn't just a color or an aesthetic—it's a whole dire vibe."

Nathaniel Muir of Aipt Comics gave the film a positive review and he wrote: "As things progress, Deliver Us relies less on jump scares and fosters distrust. The lack of a strong villain is noticeable, but the methodical take on nun horror is a nice change of pace."

A reviewer from Screen Anarchy, Kyle Logan satisfied at the film and its atmosphere and he wrote: "Deliver Us doesn't quite stick the landing in its final moments. But it's so effective as an atmospheric religious horror movie punctuated by fantastic practical gore that it's difficult to complain about it not meeting its full potential."

=== Accolades ===
Year	Awards	Category	Recipient	Result	Ref.
2023	Hollywood Music in Media Awards	Best Original Score - Horror/Thriller Film	Tóti Guðnason	Nominated	
