= Creep 2 =

2017 film by Patrick Brice

- Theatrical release poster
- Directed by: Patrick Brice
- Written by: Mark Duplass; Patrick Brice
- Based on: Characters created by Patrick Brice; Mark Duplass
- Produced by: Jason Blum; Carolyn Craddock
- Starring: Mark Duplass; Desiree Akhavan; Karan Soni
- Cinematography: Patrick Brice; Desiree Akhavan
- Edited by: Christopher Donlon
- Music by: Julian Wass
- Production companies: Blumhouse Productions; Netflix
- Distributed by: The Orchard (United States); Netflix (Note: Although Netflix released both films outside the United States, neither Creep 2 nor its predecessor are claimed to be Netflix Originals by the streaming service.) (International)
- Release dates: October 6, 2017 (Sitges); October 24, 2017 (United States)
- Running time: 80 minutes
- Country: United States
- Language: English

Creep 2 is a 2017 American found footage psychological horror film directed by Patrick Brice and written by Brice and Mark Duplass. It is a sequel to Brice's 2014 film Creep, and the second installment in the franchise of the same name. Duplass reprises his role from the first film as a serial killer who lures unsuspecting videographers to their deaths, with Desiree Akhavan portraying his latest target.

The film had its world premiere at the Sitges Film Festival on October 6, 2017, and was released by The Orchard on video on demand on October 24, 2017. Like its predecessor, Creep 2 was also critically acclaimed, with much praise focused on the film's writing, atmosphere, dark humor, and the performances among the leads.

Brice has confirmed that a third film is in development. A television series titled The Creep Tapes debuted on Shudder and AMC+ on November 15, 2024.

== Plot ==
A prolific serial killer, using the name "Aaron" after a previous victim, undergoes a midlife crisis as his fortieth birthday approaches, finding himself dissatisfied with his killings. When his latest ad for a videographer lures YouTuber Sara to his remote cabin, Aaron changes his approach by admitting he is a serial killer who will let Sara live for the next 24 hours if she records a documentary on his life. Sara, doubting his revelation, agrees to film Aaron in the hopes that the video will popularize her unsuccessful web series about eccentric Craigslist clients.

Over the course of the day, Aaron struggles to intimidate Sara, who plays along with his various eccentricities. Sara eventually admits that she does not believe Aaron is truly a serial killer, whereupon Aaron informs her that he intends to conclude the documentary by having her kill him. He later stages a suicide attempt, much to her horror. As she prepares to leave, he convinces her to stay. The two have a conversation in which Aaron admits he is a virgin who has never kissed anyone. Surprised at this revelation, Sara offers to kiss him, to which he agrees.

Aaron brings Sara into the woods, where he gifts her the same heart-shaped locket he had given to his victim in the previous film, then shows her to an open grave he dug. He then proceeds to stab himself in the stomach before handing her the knife and imploring her to stab herself, hoping to conclude their film in the same manner as Romeo and Juliet. When she attempts to flee, he stabs her and drags her to the grave. Aaron approaches the camera and starts to give a closing monologue, but a still-alive Sara emerges from the grave and strikes him in the back of the head with a shovel before fleeing.

Afterwards, Sara is recorded in public by an unidentified individual whistling a tune heard in Aaron's videos. When Sara notices the individual filming her, the camera abruptly cuts away.

== Cast ==
- Mark Duplass as Aaron
- Desiree Akhavan as Sara
- Karan Soni as Dave

Additionally, Kyle Field, Caveh Zahedi, and Jeff Man portray Wade, Randy, and Alex, subjects featured in Sara's web series. Director Patrick Brice reappears in his role as Aaron (referred to in the credits as "Old Aaron") through archive footage from the first film.

== Production ==
In March 2014, it was announced Duplass had plans on making the film into a trilogy, with RADiUS-TWC producing and distributing the films and production taking place later in the year. In February 2015, Duplass stated production hadn't begun due to scheduling issues. In August 2016, Duplass began trying on costumes for the film. That same month, Brice confirmed the sequel was moving forward.

=== Filming ===
Principal photography on the film began in September 2016.

=== Music ===
Julian Wass composed the soundtrack for Creep 2. The song that plays in the end credits is "Botanica de Los Angeles" by Xiu Xiu, taken from their album Angel Guts: Red Classroom.

== Release ==
It had its world premiere at the Sitges Film Festival on October 6, 2017. The film was released through video on demand on October 24, 2017. It was released through Netflix on December 23, 2017.

=== Critical reception ===
On the review aggregator website Rotten Tomatoes, 100% of 30 critics' reviews are positive, with an average rating of 7.7/10. The website's consensus reads: "Creep 2 has everything that made the original work and more — more laughs, more awkwardness, more unsettling terror." On Metacritic, the film has a score of 75 out of 100, based on reviews from 5 critics, indicating "generally favorable" reviews.

John DeFore of The Hollywood Reporter wrote: "The sequel will impress any fan of the original. It's fresher than most of the low-budget thrillers gracing theaters lately." Kimberley Elizabeth of Nightmare on Film Street called the film "hypnotically unsettling", giving the film a 4 out of 4 rating. Mike Sprague of JoBlo.com said the film was "just as unsettling and entertaining as the original" and awarded it an 8 out of 10 rating.

== Future ==
=== Potential sequel ===
In 2017, Brice confirmed that a third film, titled Creep 3, was in development, with Brice and Duplass returning as director and star respectively.

=== Television spin-off ===
On June 4, 2024, Duplass announced The Creep Tapes, a series set in the same universe as the films. Each half-hour episode focuses on a different victim of the serial killer. The series premiered on the streaming services Shudder and AMC+ on November 15, 2024.

== See also ==
- List of films featuring psychopaths and sociopaths
