= Creep (2014 film) =

2014 film by Patrick Brice

- Theatrical release poster
- Directed by: Patrick Brice
- Story by: Patrick Brice; Mark Duplass
- Produced by: Mark Duplass; Jason Blum
- Starring: Mark Duplass; Patrick Brice
- Edited by: Christopher Donlon
- Music by: Kyle Field; Eric Andrew Kuhn
- Production companies: Blumhouse Productions; Duplass Brothers Productions
- Distributed by: The Orchard (United States); Netflix (Note: Although Netflix released both films outside the United States, neither Creep nor its sequel is claimed to be a Netflix Original by the streaming service.) (International)
- Release dates: March 8, 2014 (SXSW); June 23, 2015 (United States)
- Running time: 78 minutes
- Country: United States
- Language: English

Creep is a 2014 American found footage psychological horror film directed by Patrick Brice, his directorial debut, from a story by Brice and Mark Duplass, who both star in the film. Filmed as found footage, Brice portrays a videographer assigned to record an eccentric client, played by Duplass, who is actually a deranged serial killer. Creep was inspired by Brice's experiences on Craigslist and the movies My Dinner with Andre, Misery, and Fatal Attraction. Brice and Duplass refined the film's story during filming, which resulted in multiple versions of each scene and several alternate end scenarios.

The film premiered on March 8, 2014, at South by Southwest, and was released on video on demand on June 23, 2015, by The Orchard prior to an international release via Netflix on July 14, 2015. It received positive reviews from critics.

The movie's success later spawned the titular franchise, with a sequel released in 2017, a spin-off series titled The Creep Tapes released on Shudder in 2024, and a potential third film in development.

== Plot ==
Strapped for cash, videographer Aaron Franklin accepts an online job request to travel to a remote cabin in Crestline, California, where he meets his client, Josef. Josef explains that he has an inoperable brain tumor and is expected to die before his pregnant wife Angela gives birth, so he wishes to have Aaron record a single day's video diary for his unborn child, "Buddy," just like the protagonist of the film My Life.

The video diary begins with Josef removing his clothes and taking a long bubble bath, pretending his child is in the tub with him, during which he becomes saddened by his impending fate and mentions that he could commit suicide at any point before then if he wanted to. Becoming unsettled, Aaron briefly steps out of the room and stumbles upon a Halloween mask of a wolf on a closet shelf, which frightens him. Josef says the wolf is named "Peachfuzz," that his father gave it to him when he was a child, and that he intends to bequeath it to Buddy, though Aaron finds its appearance too scary to be given to a child.

Throughout filming, Josef demonstrates eccentric behavior that makes Aaron uneasy, such as jump scaring Aaron by leaping out from a hiding place with a shriek, then laughing when Aaron yells in fright. It also becomes increasingly obvious that his motives and his stories about his life are falsified. While dining at a restaurant, Josef asks Aaron if he has ever done anything he's ashamed of. Aaron recalls that he struggled with incontinence as a child. Josef then admits that he stalked and secretly photographed Aaron prior to their meeting, but claims that he regrets his actions and hopes Aaron can forgive him. Aaron agrees, but attempts to leave that night, though Josef convinces him to come inside and share a drink. In the ensuing conversation, Josef confides that he lied about Peachfuzz's origins, explaining that he purchased it at a ninety-nine cent store and raped Angela while wearing it after discovering bestiality porn in her internet search history. Disturbed, Aaron crushes Benadryl to put Josef to sleep and tries to leave again, but is unable to locate his car keys. He intercepts a phone call from Angela, who reveals that she is actually Josef's sister and urges Aaron to escape. He is stopped by Josef, who breaks down in tears over his fear of dying and thanks Aaron for his kindness. When Aaron reveals he spoke to Angela, Josef flees. Aaron follows him and finds Josef wearing the Peachfuzz mask, barring the front door and growling in menace. They scuffle, and Aaron ultimately succeeds in getting away.

Aaron begins to have recurring nightmares about Josef. He also starts receiving items in the mail from Josef despite having never given Josef his address, including a videotape of Josef digging a hole in the woods, a wolf stuffed animal, a knife, and a heart-shaped locket containing photos of both of them. He contacts the police, but they are unable to take action due to Aaron knowing little about Josef. Josef approaches Aaron's house in the middle of the night, standing outside menacingly and eventually entering while Aaron is asleep, cutting a lock of his hair. A final DVD is sent to Aaron in which Josef offers to meet him in broad daylight at Lake Gregory to make amends. Aaron accepts Josef's offer, but places a camera on himself and sets his phone to speed-dial 911 as a precaution. While Aaron waits on a park bench for Josef to arrive, Josef kills him from behind with an axe while wearing the Peach Fuzz mask. While reviewing the footage, Josef questions why Aaron did not turn around in the moments leading up to his murder. He concludes that Aaron believed Josef was a good person who would not harm him - because of this, he declares Aaron to be his favorite victim.

"Josef", now calling himself Bill, later receives a phone call from his newest target as he places a DVD of Aaron's murder alongside nearly thirty other DVDs and videotapes of his past victims.

== Cast ==
- Mark Duplass as Josef
- Patrick Brice as Aaron Franklin

Duplass' real-life spouse Katie Aselton makes an uncredited appearance as the voice of Angela.

== Production ==
Duplass said that the film's story "was inspired by character-driven dramas that are, at their heart, two-handers: My Dinner with Andre, Misery, and Fatal Attraction" as well as "[his] myriad of strange Craigslist experiences over the years." Brice and Duplass originally began working on Creep under the working title Peachfuzz after the wolf mask owned by Duplass' character, but chose to rename the film as the title's relevance came later in the movie's plot and they did not want viewers to "spend the first half hour trying to figure out why the movie is called Peachfuzz and [not] pay attention to the very intricate details". The two built the movie from a series of conversations they had with one another and decided to refine Creep while they were filming, which enabled them to film and screen portions of the film to see what would or would not work on camera. As a result, the film had multiple alternate end scenarios and Duplass stated that there were "10 to 12 permutations of each scene".

Of the creative process for his character, Josef, Duplass explained: "We were interested in the psychological profile of this very, very strange person. We were very interested in how you meet people and don't quite understand what's up, but you start to get signs. For us that was intense eye contact, lack of personal space, oversharing, maybe a little bit too much love here and there. But, for me, there's something wrong with both of these guys. Deeply. This concept of, 'who is the creep in this scenario?'"

== Release ==
Creep received a world premiere at the South by Southwest film festival on March 8, 2014, and film rights were purchased by RADiUS-TWC shortly thereafter. Plans for an October 2014 video on demand release fell through, when RADiUS didn't release the film. In June 2015, The Orchard and Sony Pictures Home Entertainment (Orchard's parent company) acquired distribution rights to the film. The film was released on June 23, 2015, on video on demand, prior to a global release on Netflix on July 14, 2015.

=== Home media ===
Creep was released on DVD on April 5, 2016, from Sony Pictures Home Entertainment.

== Reception ==
Creep received positive reviews from critics. On the review aggregator website Rotten Tomatoes, 91% of 35 critics' reviews are positive, with an average rating of 7.6/10. The website's consensus reads: "A smart, oddball take on found-footage horror, Creep is clever and well-acted enough to keep viewers on the edges of their seats." Metacritic, which uses a weighted average, assigned the film a score of 74 out of 100, based on 6 critics, indicating "generally favorable" reviews.

The Hollywood Reporter and IndieWire both gave the film positive reviews, and both described it as unsettling and uncomfortable. IndieWire's B+ review writes that the movie's first part "has an oddly hypnotic quality ... laced with an unspoken malevolence" and that the second part has an "insanely terrifying" sequence, concluding, "Found footage horror movies have, thus far ... never, ever been this weird. Creep is a tiny movie whose uniqueness feels positively seismic." Variety remarked that Creep "could have been more effective if Duplass' performance were a shade more ambiguous, and the audience had a chance to at least fleetingly believe Josef might be telling the truth," but overall, "This slow-burning, semi-improvised found-footage thriller offers clever twists and a killer payoff."

Shock Till You Drop panned the movie overall, stating that "Creep might work for those don't regularly digest horror films, but for the hardened fan, this is a film that spins its wheels all too often and feels like an exercise in self-indulgence."

In 2025, an IndieWire reviewer listed it as one of the "25 Scariest Movies on Netflix," calling it an "unrelentingly creepy" film which "goes from hypnotic chiller to scary good horror movie."

== Sequels ==
Shortly after Creep's premiere at South by Southwest, Duplass announced that he intended to film a sequel. After the film distribution rights were purchased by RADiUS-TWC, he further announced that he was planning on creating a trilogy. In August 2014, Duplass further stated that he and Brice planned on filming the second Creep film at the end of the year, that the film's cast would be announced during that time, and that the trilogy would be completed in 2015. However, in February 2015, Duplass commented that neither he nor Brice had been able to start filming on Creep 2 due to scheduling issues, as the careers of both men had greatly expanded since Creep's release, but that the both of them were still actively developing the project. In May 2016, Duplass and Brice announced discussions had begun on the sequel. In August 2016, Duplass revealed that he had begun trying on costumes for the film.

In September 2016, it was announced production had begun on the film, with Duplass returning, and Desiree Akhavan joining the cast, with Brice returning as the director. Creep 2 premiered at the Sitges Film Festival on October 6, 2017, and was released through video on demand on October 24, 2017. On Rotten Tomatoes, the film has an approval rating of 100% based on 24 reviews, with an average rating of 7.6/10.

Brice and Duplass announced plans to create a third film, titled Creep 3. In March 2020, they stated that they were struggling to come up with a concept as they wanted the third film to be "super inspired".

On June 4, 2024, Duplass announced The Creep Tapes, a series set in the same universe as the films. Each half-hour episode focuses on a different victim of the serial killer. The series premiered on the streaming services Shudder and AMC+ on November 15, 2024.

== See also ==
- List of films featuring home invasions
- List of films featuring psychopaths and sociopaths
- Be My Cat: A Film for Anne (2015) - another found footage film featuring a psychopathic killer
