= The Creep Tapes =

2024 American horror television series

- Genre: Found footage Slasher; Psychological horror Dark comedy Comedy of manners
- Written by: Patrick Brice; Mark Duplass
- Directed by: Patrick Brice
- Starring: Mark Duplass
- Country of origin: United States
- Original language: English
- No. of seasons: 3
- No. of episodes: 18

Production
- Producers: Mark Duplass; Patrick Brice
- Cinematography: Patrick Brice
- Running time: 19–27 minutes
- Production companies: Duplass Brothers Productions; Shudder

Original release
- Network: Shudder; AMC+
- Release: November 15, 2024 – present

The Creep Tapes is an American found footage horror television series created and directed by Patrick Brice, and co-written by Brice and Mark Duplass. It is the third installment of the Creep franchise, and the first not to be a feature-length film. The series premiered on the streaming services Shudder and AMC+ on November 15, 2024.

In February 2025, the series was renewed for a second season, which premiered on November 14, 2025. In October 2025, the series was renewed for a third season ahead of the second season's premiere; the third season premiered on September 15, 2026.

== Plot ==
The series takes a look at the different videotapes of a serial killer and his various victims. Throughout the episodes, the killer (referred to as the "Creep" in the title, whose first appearance in media had him go by "Josef" or "Peachfuzz") makes his victims record episodes while often engaging in bizarre antics and scare tactics, and then kills them.

== Cast ==
=== Main ===
- Mark Duplass as the titular Creep, an unnamed serial killer also known as Josef, or his alter ego, Peachfuzz, who assumes various names and personas based on his victims, including "Jeff Daniels" / "Father Tom Durkin" / "Kyle" / "Trip Engold" / "David" / "Timmy" / "Randy" / "David Beasley" / "Ralph" / "Archie".

=== Special guest stars ===
==== Season 1 ====
- Mike Luciano as Mike (episode 1)
- David Nordstrom as Elliot (episode 2)
- Josh Fadem as Jeremy (episode 3)
- Josh Ruben as Brad Branson (episode 4)
- Scott Pitts as Brandt (episode 5)
- Tai Leclaire as Harry P's Friend (episode 5)
- Krisha Fairchild as Mom (episode 6)
- John Craven as Albert (episode 6)

==== Season 2 ====
- David Dastmalchian as Joseph (episode 1)
- Chris Donlon as Victim (episode 1)
- Diego Josef as Wes (episode 2)
- Desean Terry as Officer Maher (episode 2)
- Alec Bewkes as Officer (episode 2)
- Robert Longstreet as Mark (episode 3)
- Linas Phillips as Chicken Sandwich Guy (episode 3)
- Taylor Garron as Ava (episode 4)
- Timm Sharp as Nick Green (episode 5)
- Jody Lambert as Dr. Avison (episode 5)
- Katie Aselton as Angela (episode 6)
- Jeff Man as Alex "Handyman" (episode 6)

==== Season 3 ====
- Kate Siegel as Crystal (episode 1)
- Benjamin Kasulke as Man on Dock (episode 1)
- James Earl as Mo (episode 2)
- Chris Gethard as Dave (episode 2)
- Annie Henk as Woman with Bags (episode 2)
- John Baker as Man on Subway Train (episode 2)
- Rekha Shankar as Anisha (episode 3)
- Jeffery Self as Connor (episode 3)
- Jeff Barnett as Captain (episode 3)
- David Nordstrom as Elliot (episode 3)
- Nicholas Hamilton as Greg (episode 5)
- Ora Duplass as Brie (episode 6)
- Elliott Fullam as Jody (episode 6)

== Episodes ==
=== Series overview ===
| Season | Episodes | Originally released | |
| Season | Episodes | First released | Last released |
|---|---|---|---|
| 1 | 6 | November 15, 2024 | December 13, 2024 |
| 2 | 6 | November 14, 2025 | December 19, 2025 |
| 3 | 6 | September 15, 2026 | September 29, 2026 |

=== Season 1 (2024) ===
| No. overall | No. in season | Title | Directed by | Original release date |
|---|---|---|---|---|
| 1 | 1 | "Mike" | Patrick Brice | November 15, 2024 |
A filmmaker, Mike (Mike Luciano), has been hired to film an acting school application video for an aspiring actor (Mark Duplass) who calls himself "Jeff Daniels", like the famous actor of the same name. He is instructed to travel to a remote cabin in the woods, where he is to begin filming immediately. Mike follows these directions but when he tries to leave, Jeff convinces Mike to stay and film an additional scene for extra money. When this is done Mike discovers that recent snowfall has made the roads unsafe for travel, so he is forced to remain at Jeff's cabin. Jeff offers to pay Mike to create a short film, where the premise is that Jeff will chase Mike around with a rubber axe. Mike soon realizes that Jeff intends to kill him for real and tries to flee, but is struck down by Jeff.
| 2 | 2 | "Elliot" | Patrick Brice | November 15, 2024 |
Elliot (David Nordstrom) is an avid birdwatcher who has traveled to a remote location in search of a specific bird. Soon after he arrives he meets a man (Mark Duplass) who claims that he has been hurt in a skydiving accident. The man convinces Elliot to film his predicament so the skydiver can sue the skydiving company. The two men begin to discuss birding, at which point the skydiver mentions that he has seen Elliot's desired birds at a location further down the road. The two travel to the location, during which time the skydiver asks Elliot why he likes birding. Elliot states that he enjoys stalking the birds and watching them before they are aware of his presence. He also mentions that he enjoys filming them so he can re-watch the process over and over. The skydiver asks if Elliot has ever baited the birds into doing what he wants, which Elliot denies despite evidence to the contrary. Elliot manages to see his desired bird, after which he is suffocated by the skydiver.
| 3 | 3 | "Jeremy" | Patrick Brice | November 22, 2024 |
Jeremy (Josh Fadem) is an internet personality who focuses on exposing others. He decides to interview Father Tom Durkin (Mark Duplass) in order to expose the sins of the church and travels out to Tom's remote home. The interview ends with Jeremy screaming at Tom, who then decides to show him a video of Tom receiving an exorcism while wearing the wolf mask. Tom then informs Jeremy that he had killed the priest and assumed his position to honor the man's memory. He pushes for Jeremy to receive a baptism, but Jeremy manages to escape after hitting Tom with his belt. Jeremy manages to make it to his car, which fails to start due to Tom sabotaging the motor. He is then slain by Tom.
| 4 | 4 | "Brad" | Patrick Brice | November 29, 2024 |
Brad Branson (Josh Ruben) is a filmmaker who is approached by a fan (Mark Duplass) of a movie he made decades ago. He wants to work with Brad on a true crime documentary and brings Brad to his home, where he is shown a dead body. The fan gives the horrified Brad the choice of either calling the police or making the film. Brad decides to make the film and the two bury the body in a grave recently dug by the fan. Brad discovers multiple clues that the fan murdered the victim. He eventually decides to leave, but when he backs up to drive away he runs over another body. Brad decides to place this new victim in the same grave as before, where the fan asks him to guess who killed the victims. Brad guesses that the second person killed the first, which the fan states is incorrect. The fan then knocks out Brad. When he awakens Brad is shown footage that makes it appear as if he was the killer. Brad then tries to flee, but is slain by the fan.
| 5 | 5 | "Brandt" | Patrick Brice | December 6, 2024 |
A man named "Kyle" (Mark Duplass) films himself placing axes in a hotel room containing a body bag. He theorizes about codependency and then pulls the Peachfuzz mask out of the bag. Kyle is implied to be codependent on the Peachfuzz persona, which is depicted as a separate entity. He wants to perform the next murder without the mask, which angers "Peachfuzz". As the victim Brandt (Scott Pitts) arrives, Kyle is shown tied up in the bathroom by Peachfuzz. He manages to get free of the bindings and asks Brandt to wait for him outside the room and count to three. Brandt does so and as he opens the door, Kyle, wearing the Peachfuzz mask, throws an axe at Brandt, killing him.
| 6 | 6 | "Mom (and Albert)" | Patrick Brice | December 13, 2024 |
A man (Mark Duplass) records himself driving through the countryside while discussing his favorite film, Forrest Gump. His monologue is interrupted by banging noises from the car’s trunk, where he reveals a man he has kidnapped. He kills the man with a knife and continues his trip to his mother’s house. Upon arrival, his mother (Krisha Fairchild) greets him warmly and calls him by his childhood nickname, “Wolfy.” She shows him a bedroom made to look like the one from his youth, though small differences cause Wolfy to become emotional and agitated. That evening, Wolfy meets his mother’s boyfriend, Albert (John Craven), during dinner. Wolfy grows increasingly possessive and confrontational, questioning Albert’s relationship with his mother and implying that Albert has overstepped boundaries. Later, Albert offers to help Wolfy with his car, only to discover the corpse in the trunk. Wolfy calmly confronts him, insisting that Albert has learned too much, and kills him with the axe. Wolfy and his mother bury Albert in the backyard. Sitting beside the grave, Wolfy reflects on his desire to be loved and admired like Forrest Gump. In the final moments, he rests his head on his mother’s chest as she comforts him, the camera lingering on their unsettling embrace.

=== Season 2 (2025) ===
| No. overall | No. in season | Title | Directed by | Original release date |
|---|---|---|---|---|
| 7 | 1 | "Joseph" | Patrick Brice | November 14, 2025 |
Copycat killer "Joseph" (David Dastmalchian), who has seen dark-web clips of the footage recorded in the original Creep, places an online ad requesting a videographer to record him for a day. The real Josef (Mark Duplass) responds, assuming the role played by Aaron in the first film. As Joseph clumsily reenacts the events leading up to Aaron's murder, Josef frustrates him by passive-aggressively criticizing his presentation and undercutting his attempts at intimidation. Ultimately, Josef reveals his identity and tells Joseph he came looking for a partner — but Joseph has failed to impress him. Crushed, Joseph confesses the feelings of inadequacy that led him to become a copycat. Josef consoles him with promises that he can still do something memorable and original. The episode closes with Josef filming Joseph's suicide.
| 8 | 2 | "Wes" | Patrick Brice | November 21, 2025 |
Wes (Diego Josef) takes a job shooting a TV pilot for a house-flipping show hosted by real estate agent Trip Engold (Mark Duplass). When Trip begins to drive him deep into the forest, Wes realizes that Trip is misleading him and jumps from the car. Trip chases him down and knocks him out with a shovel. Before Trip can load the still-breathing Wes into his trunk, he is interrupted by the arrival of two police officers (Desean Terry and Alec Bewkes) who immediately suspect him of the attack. Trip stalls the pair by claiming that he and Wes were both attacked by a murderous stranger posing as a real estate agent. Wes briefly regains consciousness and frantically recounts his own story, seemingly confirming Trip's account, before a seizure overcomes him. As the police attempt to take Wes to the hospital, Trip kills both officers and complains about their lack of professionalism.
| 9 | 3 | "Mark" | Patrick Brice | November 28, 2025 |
Inspired by the premises of Saw and Dexter, the killer (Mark Duplass) kidnaps a man (Robert Longstreet) and imprisons him in an elaborate underground escape room. Pretending to be another victim in the same situation, the killer quickly grows exasperated by the dim-witted victim's inability to solve his puzzles. He reveals his identity in a fit of frustration and learns, in turn, that he has kidnapped the wrong man. The killer's intended victim was John Anderson, a surgeon who sexually abuses his male patients; the man chained in the bathroom is Mark, John's housesitting cousin. The killer abandons the escape room, sulking. Mark later solves a single clue and escapes, only to be murdered by the axe-wielding killer.
| 10 | 4 | "Ava" | Patrick Brice | December 5, 2025 |
Ava (Taylor Garron), hired to film a promotional video for an animal shelter, believes she has found the new Joe Exotic in David (Mark Duplass), the bizarre man who greets her at the shelter's address. David says he opposes all cooking, whether plant or animal; his shelter animals are wooden figurines named after previous victims. Hoping to make a documentary as salacious and profitable as Tiger King, Ava revels in recording his histrionic behavior and pushes him to reveal the source of his apparent trauma around cooking. Her interrogation culminates in a meltdown during which David attempts to reenact the traumatic event by dousing himself in gasoline and striking a match. Ava stops him and gives him a hug, believing she has helped him resolve his mental dysfunction. David notes that she is now covered in gasoline, too. He steps away, flicks a lit match at Ava and calmly watches her burn to death.
| 11 | 5 | "Nick" | Patrick Brice | December 12, 2025 |
Nick Green (Timm Sharp) is confronted by his purported new therapist's (Mark Duplass) odd behavior during an emergency therapy session on Christmas Eve, after the phony therapist invaded the house of the real Dr. Avison (Jody Lambert) and killed him. Nick begs the "therapist" to see him and starts describing his problems, which the therapist privately concludes can be summarized as "daddy issues", and the therapist interrupts him, expresses his surprise that Nick hasn't already carried out suicide, and recommends an experimental new therapy involving Santa Claus viewed as a father figure. Nick is reluctant to participate, but pleased to get a chance to experience traditions he missed out on as a child. Nick confides in the therapist who is dressed as Santa, while sitting on his lap, that his father did leave him as a child, which the therapist connects to his own childhood trauma. The therapist alludes to the possibility that his own father sexually abused him, which disturbs Nick who says he wants to go home for the night, but the therapist had spiked his "soy nog" and he passes out. Nick regains consciousness the next morning and is delivered a "present" in a golden box by the therapist, which is the severed head of his father who the therapist had apparently found and killed for him. Nick, horrified, tries to escape the house, but ultimately trips down the stairs and fatally injures himself in a manner the therapist compares to the Christmas horror film Gremlins.
| 12 | 6 | "Angela" | Patrick Brice | December 19, 2025 |
Angela's (Katie Aselton) visit from an estranged "family member" (Mark Duplass) goes haywire after she blackmails him into coming to her house, where she is supposedly under house arrest with an ankle monitor, by ringing him and threatening to call the police on him while he was killing a victim. Aselton reprises her role as Josef's "sister" Angela, who appeared in a voice-only capacity in the original Creep film. A drunk Angela forces Josef to drink her alcoholic "juice" as he complains about her reckless uses of the money he provides her to support her lifestyle. Angela recounts a third blender she bought being a "wedding present" between her and Josef, to which Josef says she's misremembering things. Angela expresses her desire to spend more time with Josef and the encounter becomes increasingly sexual, to Josef's discomfort. He confesses to the camera his difficulty saying "no" to her and his pride in maintaining boundaries. Angela shows Josef a tape she claims she made with him when they were younger, but it breaks. Josef consoles the distraught Angela, who tells him the only way to appease her is for them to recreate the film together. As they film it, Josef resists Angela's attempt to seduce him. She again claims they're married, which Josef explains was an unofficial backyard ceremony when they were in high school, and reveals that she drugged him. A "handyman" (Jeff Man) arrives to apparently fix a toilet, who Angela had called as an alternative to Josef when she thought he wouldn't come to visit. Angela greets and seduces the handyman before Josef appears and kills him, exciting her. He tells her they can't be together and walks out, leading her to electrocute herself with her ankle monitor around her neck using a zapper remote Josef had in his pants. Josef runs to the paralyzed Angela's aid, and the episode closes with her forcing his hand onto her and smiling.

=== Season 3 (2026) ===
| No. overall | No. in season | Title | Directed by | Original release date |
|---|---|---|---|---|
| 13 | 1 | "Crystal" | Patrick Brice | September 15, 2026 |
A washed-up rock star tries to reclaim his former glory through the production of a salacious video.
| 14 | 2 | "Mo" | Patrick Brice | September 15, 2026 |
A local New Yorker is stalked by an unwanted suitor through the five boroughs.
| 15 | 3 | "Anisha" | Patrick Brice | September 22, 2026 |
A journalist meets a mysterious businessman on a private plane with the hope of landing a bombshell interview.
| 16 | 4 | "Nobody" | Patrick Brice | September 22, 2026 |
They say inside you are two wolves. Sometimes it’s just one.
| 17 | 5 | "Greg" | Patrick Brice | September 29, 2026 |
Someone has been secretly living alongside Greg in his apartment for six days.
| 18 | 6 | "Jody + Brie" | Patrick Brice | September 29, 2026 |
A quiet evening between two friends is interrupted by the new kid in town.

== Production ==
Development of a television series based on Creep was announced as soon as principal photography on the series had wrapped in June 2024. Mark Duplass was confirmed to be reprising his role as the nameless killer. Patrick Brice, the director of Creep (2014) and Creep 2 (2017), was announced to return as director and a co-writer alongside Mark Duplass. It was also announced that the first season would consist of six half-hour episodes.

In February 2025, the series was renewed for a second season consisting of six half-hour episodes, which premiered in November of the same year.

In October 2025, the series was renewed for a third season. By December, it was announced that two episodes have already been filmed.

== Release ==
The first three episodes were shown at Fantastic Fest on September 25, 2024. The first season premiered on Shudder and AMC+ on November 15, 2024, with a two-episode premiere.

The second season premiered on Shudder and AMC+ on November 14, 2025.

The third season premiered on Shudder and AMC+ on September 15, 2026, with a two-episode premiere.

== Reception ==
Like the films, the series has received generally positive reviews from critics. On Rotten Tomatoes, the first season holds an approval rating of 75% based on 12 critic reviews. Metacritic, which uses a weighted average, assigned the season a score of 55 out of 100, based on 5 critics, indicating "mixed or average" reviews.

Jarrod Jones of AV Club wrote a favorable review for The Creep Tapes, noting that while the show had some flaws, "At its best, The Creep Tapes transcends its content-mill trappings and becomes something approaching a work of art." Meagan Navarro of Bloody Disgusting rated the show 4/5 skulls, calling it a "welcome expansion of the films. It’s not a reinvention of the format, but rather a fun experiment that explores more dark corners and impulses of a disturbed individual." Variety's Aramide Tinubu reviewed the first two episodes, stating that the series thus acted "more as a disjointed vanity project than a horror story spotlighting a homicidal maniac’s bloodlust." Kaiya Shunyata of RogerEbert.com was also critical, rating it at 2/4 stars and noting that the first two episodes felt like a rehashing of the first two films.

On Rotten Tomatoes, the second season holds an approval rating of 100% based on 7 reviews.

On Rotten Tomatoes, the third season holds an approval rating of 100% based on 5 reviews.
