= Amber Rubarth =

American musician

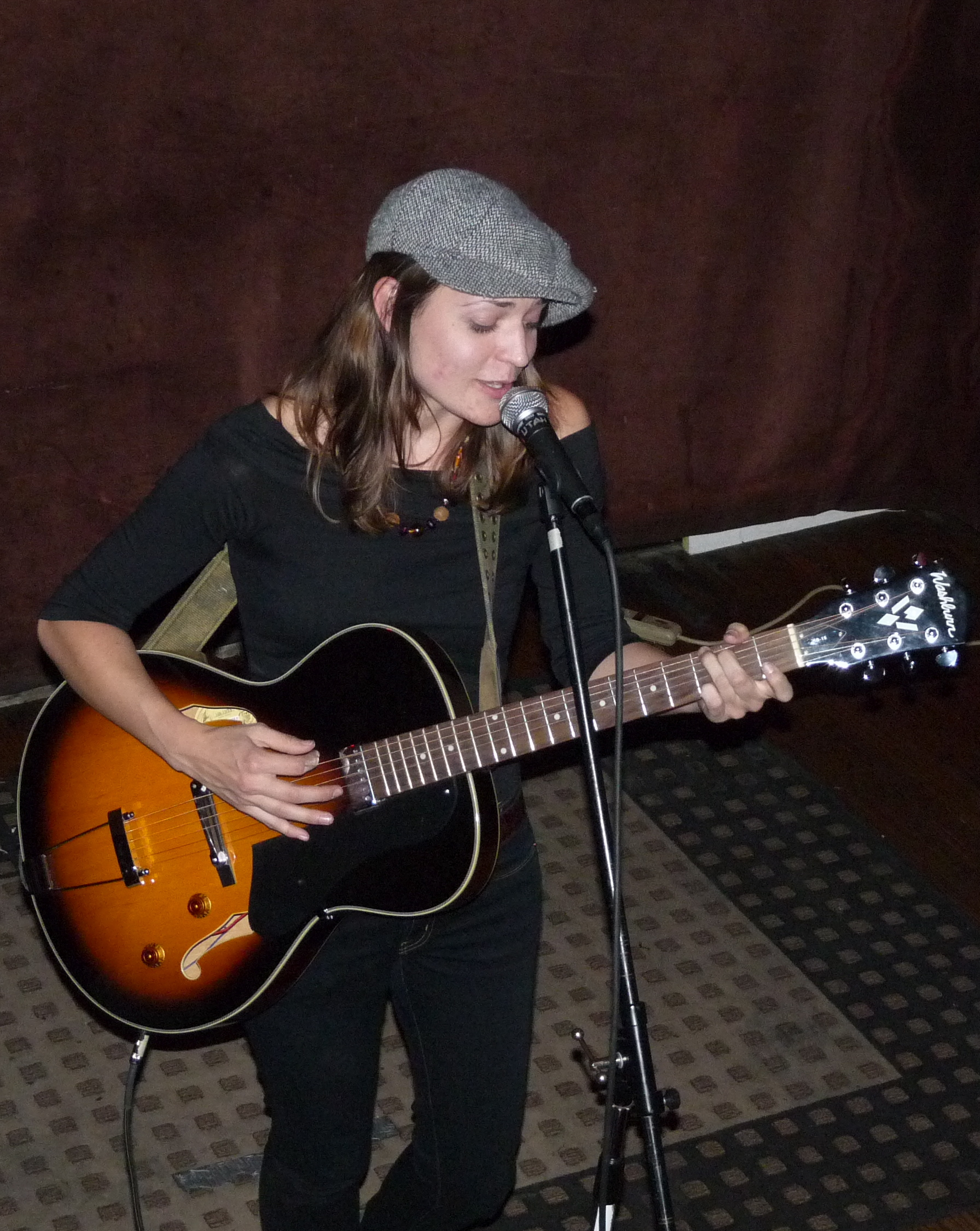
- Rubarth performing in 2022

Background information
- Born: California, U.S.
- Genre: Folk
- Occupations: Singer, songwriter
- Instruments: Guitar, Piano, Electric Bass, Vocals
- Years active: 2004–present
- Labels: 30 Tigers, Newsong, Chesky, Cambium, Gearbox Records
- Website: www.amberrubarth.com

Amber Rubarth is an American singer-songwriter. She has toured extensively throughout Europe, North America, Japan, South Korea and South Africa.

Winner of the NPR Mountain Stage New Song Contest, her eighth album, ‘Wildflowers in the Graveyard’ is engineered and co-produced (with Rubarth) by Matt Andrews (Gillian Welch, David Rawlings, Dawes) and is a concept album of self-penned songs around the cycles of life, death and rebirth as witnessed in nature and relationships. Rubarth’s earlier studio album, A Common Case of Disappearing, was produced by Grammy Award-winning producer Jacquire King and debuted at No. 13 on the iTunes Singer-Songwriter charts. It features duets with Jason Reeves, and Jason Mraz. Chesky Records released two binaural albums recorded live at St. Elias Church in which Rubarth collaborated with cellist Dave Eggar. The album received great acclaim and led to a performance with the full Ithaca College Chamber Orchestra. Rubarth has performed twice for TED Talks.

In addition to her solo work, Rubarth is the co-founder of the Brooklyn-based indie band The Paper Raincoat with Alex Wong (as heard on Google and Aquafina commercials), and the U.K.-based harmony trio Applewood Road, named in The Telegraph's best albums of 2016. Her original arrangement for the group of R.E.M.'s 'Losing My Religion' has received over 1 million plays on Spotify, with her solo live performance video reposted by the band as a "beautiful rendition."

Rubarth has composed songs and scored for films, including collaborations with Paul Brill for Sundance Film Festival winner Joan Rivers: A Piece of Work and the end credit song for the documentary Desert Runners. Rubarth's arrangement of the traditional "My Dear Companion", performed by her trio Applewood Road, is on the 2017 BBC documentary Sisters of Country: Dolly, Linda and Emmylou and she can be heard with her band The Paper Raincoat on Disney's The Last Song soundtrack featuring Miley Cyrus and Liam Hemsworth. As well as co-starring in the 2018 feature film 'American Folk,' Rubarth also composed 2 original songs and is featured heavily on the soundtrack alongside Joe Purdy, John Prine, David Grisman and Jerry Garcia. In 2020 she produced the album Fantastic Fungi: Reimagine, featuring 24 artists (including her single "Everything I Thought I Knew) inspired by the film and mycelial kingdom.

== Biography ==
Rubarth was born in California. At age 17, she graduated high school and moved to Carson City, Nevada, to apprentice at a wood sculpture studio. After three years, she quit the apprenticeship to pursue music. She taught herself to play guitar and began performing at local open mic nights and coffee shops. Phil Ramone in The Huffington Post describes her style as "part of the new old-soul generation."

She tours with a 1956 Gibson ES-125 hollow body electric guitar and plays piano. In her band The Paper Raincoat she sings and plays keyboard, guitar, glockenspiel, and occasionally drums. With Applewood Road trio, she arranges, sings, plays guitar and electric bass. She also toured with Glen Phillips (of Toad the Wet Sprocket) as his support act and side musician on vocals, electric guitar, keys, and electric bass.

== Tours ==
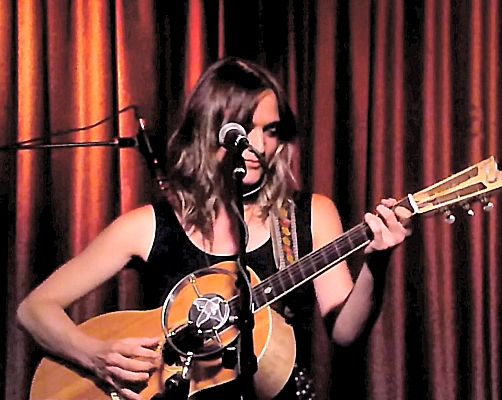
Amber Rubarth playing at the Hotel Cafe in May 2016

Amber Rubarth has toured extensively throughout the US, Canada, UK, France, Germany, Sweden, Norway, Denmark, Belgium, Austria, the Netherlands, Switzerland, South Africa, and Japan.

In May 2009 Rubarth joined Jason Reeves and Brendan James to create "The Vespa Experiment," a musical tour along the California coast in which the three artists traveled on Vespa mopeds, camped, and did community awareness activities for 13 days to support environmentalism. In September 2009, she toured America and Canada supporting Gary Jules and Joshua Radin.

In 2017 Glen Phillips of Toad the Wet Sprocket invited Rubarth to join his U.S. tour as the opening act as well as part of his trio for which she played bass guitar, electric guitar, keyboards, and vocals.

== The Paper Raincoat ==
In addition to her solo work, Rubarth formed a band with songwriter Alex Wong, called the Paper Raincoat. Rubarth explained in an interview with The Boston Globe that her solo work tends to be more personal, whereas the Paper Raincoat's songs are more imaginative, involving fictional characters Their debut EP (Safe in the Sound) was featured as an iTunes Indie Spotlight Artist

In the fall of 2009, they toured the U.S. as support for Vienna Teng, and their music was the subject of CNET's 'The 404' podcast The album The Paper Raincoat was released in October 2009. The band was named "Best of What's Next" by Paste Magazine who said "We think the world might be a little better if everyone heard this record." Their songs have been featured in Disney's The Last Song, One Tree Hill and Google and Aquafina commercials.

== Movies ==
Rubarth played the lead role of Joni in the feature film American Folk, which was released in the U.S. through Good Deed Entertainment on January 26, 2018. The film was featured at film festivals around the world, followed by a US theater release, then picked up by Hulu and Amazon Prime. Amber Rubarth received an Ebertfest "Golden Thumb" award in April 2023.

== Awards and honors ==
Rubarth was awarded Grand Prize in the NPR Mountain Stage New Song Contest for "Letter from My Lonelier Self" (2010). The prize included recording with Jacquire King and a performance on NPR's Mountain Stage. The album was released on September 30, 2011 through the contest organizer Newsong Recordings.

Rubarth's song "Washing Day", written with Adam Levy, won 1st Place in the 2006 International Songwriting Competition in the Lyrics Only category judged by Tom Waits, Brian Wilson, and Robert Smith. The music video was screened at the 2007 SXSW Festival in Austin, Texas

On May 8, 2008, Bob Boilen chose "You Will Love This Song" from her second album New Green Lines for his NPR show All Things Considered. He said he was "attracted by her honesty and humor". On August 26, 2009, Tom Robinson featured the song on his BBC Radio show Fresh on the Net in the UK. She was listed No. 16 in the UK "Music to Die For's Top 100 Favourite Female Vocalists of the Decade"

Rubarth was awarded “Best Actress” for her lead performance in the feature film ‘’American Folk’’ at the 2018 Scruffy City Film Festival.

== Recordings ==
Something New (2005) - Full-length album recorded in Brooklyn, NY, produced by The Animators.

Unfinished Art EP (2007) - Limited edition handmade version of her "Unfinished Art" EP consisted of an original blind contour painting by Rubarth pressed onto a hanging handmade canvas with the album and liner notes inserted in the back.

New Green Lines (2008) - full-length album featuring "You Will Love This Song"

The Church EP (2009) - collaboration EP with Adam Levy, recorded upstate New York in an old church.

Good Mystery (2009) to sold out audience at Joe's Pub in New York City. The collectors edition is a hand-crafted birch wood box with red wax hummingbird seal on a sliding lid top. Limited edition of 1000 handmade boxes sold out almost immediately through pre-order. #1 Best seller on Amie Street on release day and for two additional weeks.

The Paper Raincoat (2009) - collaboration with Alex Wong and Kevin Rice. Full-length album for the band the Paper Raincoat

A Common Case of Disappearing (2011) - "New and Noteworthy" release on iTunes, debuted at #13 on the Singer Songwriter charts. NewSong Recordings. Produced by Jacquire King, features duets with Jason Reeves and Jason Mraz. Band included Adam Levy (guitar), Marco Giovino (drums), Frank Howard Swart (bass) and Zac Rae (keys).

Sessions from the 17th Ward (2012) - Live HD Binaural recording featuring Dave Eggar (cello), Tim Snider (violin), and Chuck Palmer (percussion). Chesky Records.

Applewood Road (Applewood Road) (Feb 2016) Trio harmony collaboration with Emily Barker and Amy Speace, released on Gearbox Records (UK)

Scribbled Folk Symphonies (April 2016) Live album released on Chesky Records, featuring string and oboe arrangements. Includes string and vocal arrangement of R.E.M.'s "Losing My Religion" among other original and cover songs.

Wildflowers in the Graveyard (September 29, 2017) Solo album self-penned by Rubarth on the theme of life/death/rebirth cycles as found in nature and relationships. Recorded analogue to 2" tape with Matt Andrews (Gillian Welch, David Rawlings Machine, Dawes) in Nashville. (Cambium Records)

== Discography ==
- New Green Lines (Sounden, 2008)
- The Church with Adam Levy (2009)
- Good Mystery (2009)
- A Common Case of Disappearing (Newsong, 2011)
- Sessions from the 17th Ward (Chesky, 2012)
- Scribbled Folk Symphonies (Chesky, 2016)
- Applewood Road (Gearbox, 2016)
- Wildflowers in the Graveyard (Cambium, 2017)
