= Trey Edward Shults =

American filmmaker (born 1988)

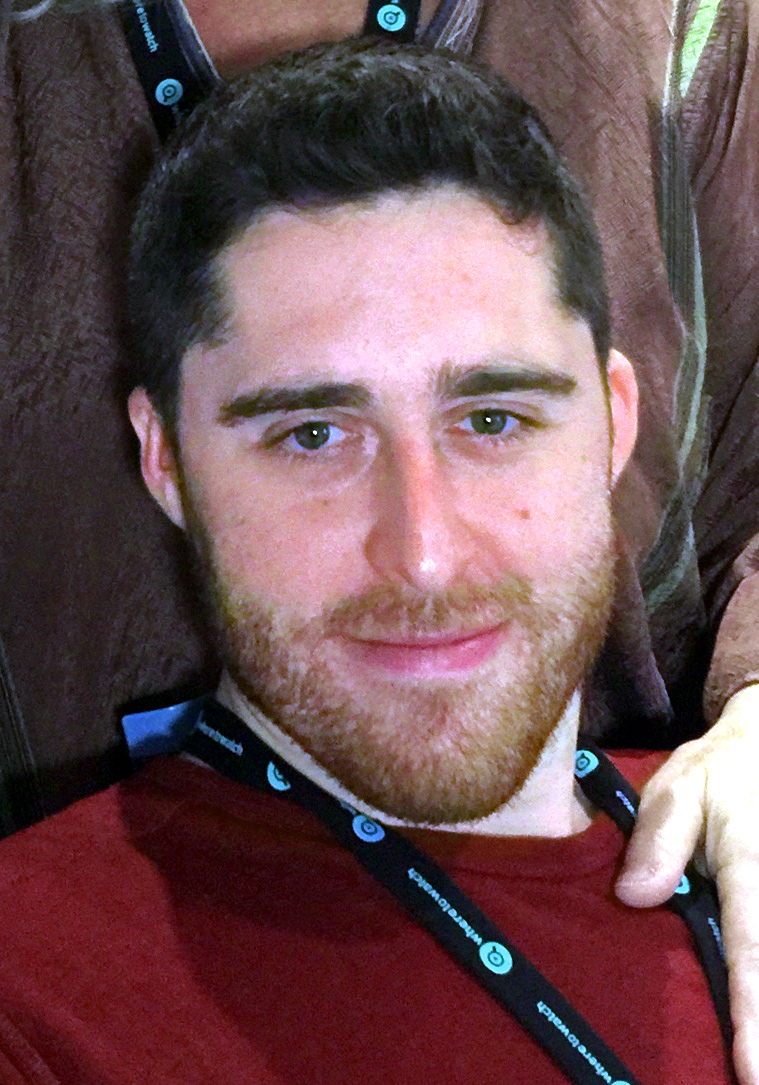
- Shults in 2015
- Born: October 6, 1988 (age 37); Montgomery, Texas, U.S.
- Occupations: Film director, producer, writer, actor
- Years active: 2010–present
- Relatives: Krisha Fairchild (aunt)

Trey Edward Shults (born October 6, 1988) is an American film director, producer, writer, and actor. He is best known as the director and writer of the drama Krisha (2015), the psychological horror film It Comes at Night (2017), the drama Waves (2019), and the thriller Hurry Up Tomorrow (2025).

== Life and career ==
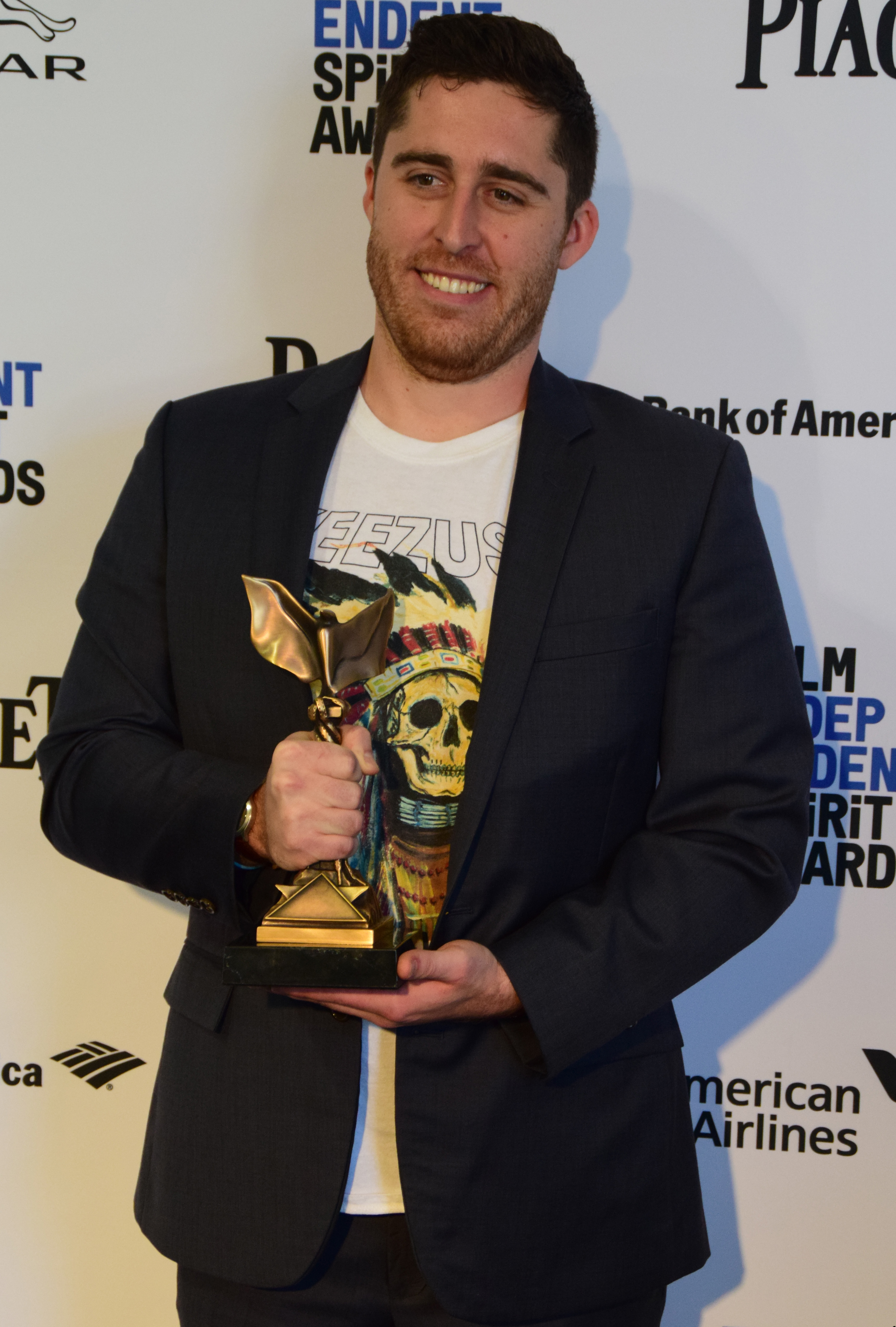
Trey at the 2016 Independent Spirit Awards

Shults was born in Montgomery, Texas, the son of Robyn (Fairchild) and William Shults.

In 2010, he made his directorial debut in the short film Mother and Son, which he also wrote, edited, and produced. It starred Krisha Fairchild and Lucas Quintana. In 2011 and 2012, Shults variously served as film loader, post-production intern, and intern, on three of Terrence Malick's films, Song to Song, Voyage of Time, and The Tree of Life. At the time, Shults was a business management student but dropped out to work on films and study films himself. In 2011, Shults wrote, directed, produced, and edited, a short film starring Fairchild, titled Two to One.

In 2014, Shults directed, wrote, produced, edited, and appeared in Krisha, a short film starring Fairchild, Robyn, and Billie Fairchild, all of whom are related to Shults. The following year, he directed, wrote, and acted in a feature-length adaptation of the same name, which premiered at South by Southwest in March 2015, winning the Grand Jury Award. The film is based upon a real-life incident involving Shults's cousin, who experienced a relapse at a family reunion. It was acquired by A24 and released in 2016.

In March 2015, Shults signed with William Morris Endeavor. Shults also served as the camera PA on the 2016 film Midnight Special.

A24 also released Shults's 2017 psychological horror film, It Comes at Night, starring Joel Edgerton. He followed this film with the critically acclaimed drama Waves, which was released on November 15, 2019. His most recent film, Hurry Up Tomorrow, starring Abel Tesfaye, Jenna Ortega and Barry Keoghan, was released in May 2025 by Lionsgate and was widely panned by critics and audiences.

Shults next began work on an untitled Hockey series from producer Shawn Levy, of which Shults will direct the first two episodes.

== Filmography ==
Short film

Year	Title	Director	Writer	Producer	Editor	Notes
2010	Mother and Son	Yes	Yes	Yes	Yes	
2011	Two to One	Yes	Yes	Yes	Yes	
2014	Krisha	Yes	Yes	Yes	Yes	Role: Trey

Feature film

Year	Title	Director	Writer	Producer	Editor	Notes
2015	Krisha	Yes	Yes	Yes	Yes	Role: Trey
2017	It Comes at Night	Yes	Yes	No	Yes	
2019	Waves	Yes	Yes	Yes	Yes	
2025	Hurry Up Tomorrow	Yes	Yes	Executive	Yes	

Television

Year	Title	Notes
2023	Winning Time: The Rise of the Lakers Dynasty	Episode "The Magic Is Back"
2026	Cape Fear	Episode "Possum"
