= Joe Purdy =

American singer/songwriter

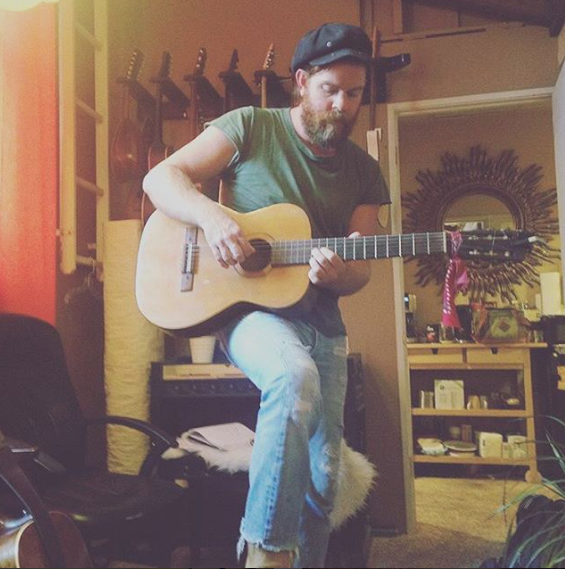

Background information
- Origin: Northwest Arkansas, United States
- Genres: Folk, folk rock, reggae, rock
- Occupation(s): Singer, songwriter, musician
- Instrument(s): voice, guitar, mandolin, harmonica, piano, banjo
- Website: joepurdy.com

Joe Purdy is an American singer/songwriter who has released fourteen albums over the last fifteen years. In 2017, Purdy made his acting debut in American Folk.

== Career ==
Purdy's albums Paris in the Morning and You Can Tell Georgia have sold a combined 80,000 single downloads online worldwide. His catalog of music has sold over 800,000 single downloads worldwide. A regular at The Hotel Café in Los Angeles, Purdy traveled to the UK with Tom McRae in 2006 as part of McRae's Hotel Cafe Tour.

Purdy's appearance at the Wireless Festival in Leeds led to a special request from The Who member Pete Townshend and musician Rachel Fuller to play with them at their acoustic "In the Attic" series of shows.

Purdy has also supported The Giving Tree Band starting in 2012, performing live shows and traveling with them on tours.

Purdy's band members have included Chris Seefried, Brian Wright, Willy C. Golden, Al Sgro, and Mike Freas.

== Recordings ==
Purdy's released albums are Joe Purdy, Sessions from Motor Ave., Stompingrounds, Julie Blue, Only Four Seasons, You Can Tell Georgia, Paris In The Morning, Canyon Joe, Take My Blanket and Go, Last Clock On the Wall, 4th of July, This American, Eagle Rock Fire, Who Will Be Next? and American Folk.

You Can Tell Georgia was recorded outside London immediately following a European tour with Tom McRae. Paris in the Morning was recorded during a short visit to Paris a few months later. In July 2009, Purdy began touring with Steve Earle.

== Television ==
His song "Wash Away (Reprise)", from the Julie Blue album, was chosen by J. J. Abrams for the third episode of ABC's hit TV show Lost in its first season.

Shortly after, the song "Suitcase" was featured in the seventh episode of Grey's Anatomy and "I Love the Rain" (also off Julie Blue) was featured in the eighth episode of the ABC show which led to "The City" (from Only Four Seasons) being included on the Grey's Anatomy Season One soundtrack, which sold over 150,000 units. In addition to "Suitcase", Purdy landed two more songs in Grey's episodes "Can't Get It Right Today" (from You Can Tell Georgia) and, most recently, "San Jose" (from Take My Blanket And Go).

His song "Rainy Day Lament" (And "Good Days" from the album Stompingrounds), was featured in the first episode of House M.D.'s 7th season.

The song "Mary May & Bobby" was also featured in an episode of Suburgatory.

His song "Miss Me" from the album "Last Clock on the Wall" was featured at the end of the New Amsterdam episode "Falling" (Season 5 Episode 11) which first aired January 3, 2023.

== Movies ==
Purdy's song "Mary" (off the album Julie Blue) was featured in the film The Secret Life of Bees. He has also had a song, "Miss Me", in the Drew Barrymore and Justin Long movie Going the Distance. Several of Purdy's songs are featured in the 2013 film Straight A's. Also, Purdy's song "Outlaws" was featured in the movie A Case of You. Purdy's song "This Town" was featured in the film Underdogs.

Purdy played the lead role of Elliot in the feature film American Folk, which was released in the U.S. through Good Deed Entertainment on January 26, 2018.

== Discography ==
=== Albums ===
2001	Joe Purdy: Released: August 10, 2001
2002	Sessions from Motor Ave.: Released: June 15, 2002
2003	StompinGrounds: Released: June 30, 2003
2004	Julie Blue: Released: October 18, 2004
2006	Only Four Seasons: Released: April 19, 2006
2006	You Can Tell Georgia: Released: September 5, 2006
2006	Paris in the Morning: Released: December 16, 2006
2007	Canyon Joe: Released: March 22, 2007
2007	Take My Blanket and Go: Released: September 18, 2007
2009	Last Clock on the Wall: Released: March 17, 2009
2010	4th of July: Released: June 24, 2010
2010	This American: Released: December 4, 2010
2014	Eagle Rock Fire: Released: July 8, 2014
2016	Who Will Be Next?: Released: June 10, 2016
2018	American Folk: Released: January 26, 2018
2022	Coyote: Released: March 4, 2022
