= Krisha Fairchild =

American actress

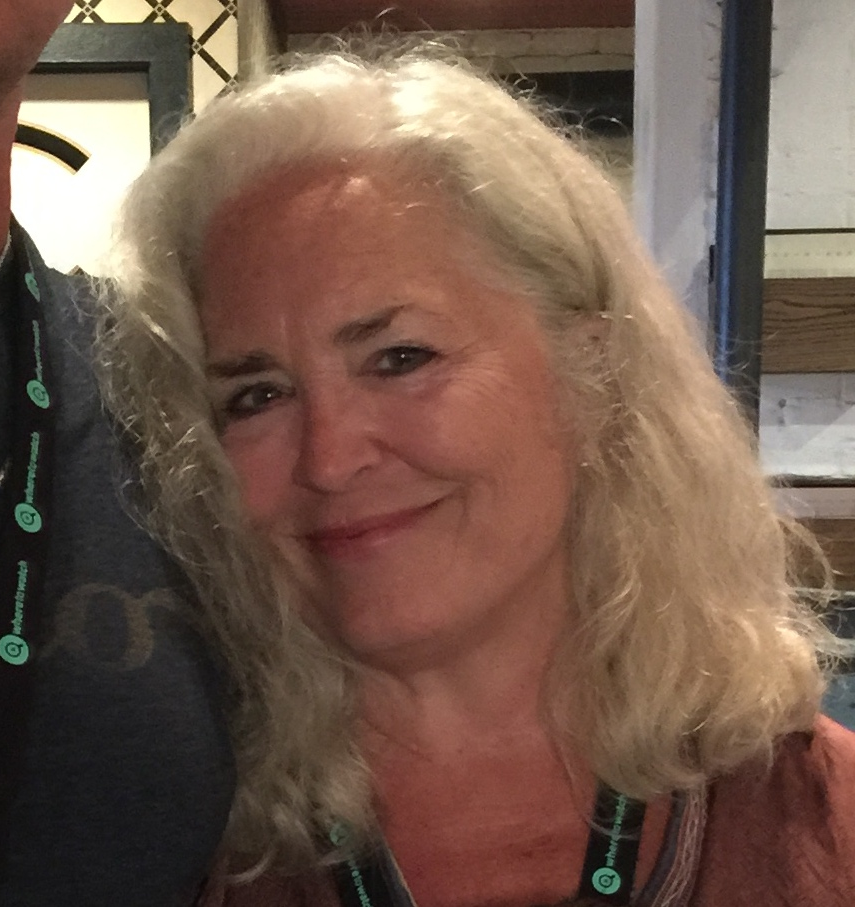
- Fairchild in 2015
- Born: December 24, 1950 (age 75); Texas, United States
- Occupation: Actress
- Years active: 1976– present
- Relatives: Trey Edward Shults (nephew)

Krisha Fairchild is an American actress, best known for starring in her nephew Trey Edward Shults' critically acclaimed film Krisha (2015). She is also known for her role as Louise Lispector in Syfy's horror anthology series Channel Zero: Butcher's Block.

== Filmography ==
=== Film ===
Year	Title	Role	Notes
1991	Dogfight	Truckstop Cook	
1991	Past Midnight	Dr. Zastoupil	
1992	Adventures in Spying	Mom	
1998	Under Heaven	Cynthia's Mother	also known as In the Shadow
2002	Highway	Naomi	
2006	The Killing of John Lennon	Chapman's Mother	
2010	Mother and Son	Mother	Short film
2011	Two to One	Woman	Short film
2014	Krisha	Krisha	Short film
2015	Krisha	Krisha	
2017	American Folk	Scottie	
2017	Inheritance	Bonnie	
2019	Waves	English Teacher	
2020	Freeland	Devi	
2024	In Our Blood	Ana Stuart	

=== Television ===
Year	Title	Role	Notes
1990	Chips, the War Dog	DFD Woman	Television film
1991	Claymation Comedy of Horrors	Registration Monster	Television short; voice role
1992–1994	Northern Exposure	Townswoman / Sturdy Woman	Guest role; 2 episodes
1992	Crazy in Love	Vivien	Television film
1992	The Danger of Love: The Carolyn Warmus Story	Teri	Television film
1993	Better Off Dead	Lurline	Television film
2018	Channel Zero: Butcher's Block	Louise Lispector	Main role; 6 episodes
2019	The Act	Prison Doctor	Episode: "Free"
2024	The Creep Tapes	Mom	Episode "Mom (and Albert)"

=== Video games ===
Year	Title	Role	Notes
1995	Torin's Passage	Mrs. Plant / Odalisque	Voice role
1996	Hellbender	Amatsu Logic System / Clarendon Base	Voice role
1996	Pajama Sam: No Need to Hide When it's Dark Outside	Wishing Well / Wink	Voice role
1997	Betrayal in Antara	Maria Liana / Naomi	Voice role
1998	Freddi Fish 3: The Case of the Stolen Conch Shell	Uncle Blenny	Voice role
1998	Police Quest: Swat 2	Suspect / Gangster / Hostage / Patient / Newscaster / Female Lineperson	Voice role
1998	Blood II: The Chosen		Voice role
1999	Starsiege	Squadmate #4	Voice role

== Awards and nominations ==
Year	Award	Category	Work	Result
2015	Connect Film Festival, AUS	Best Actor (Female)	Krisha	Nominated
2015	Nashville Film Festival	Best Actress	Krisha	Won
2016	International Online Cinema Awards	Best Actress	Krisha	Nominated
2016	Los Angeles Film Critics Association	New Generation Award (shared with Trey Edward Shults)	Krisha	Won
2020	Sidewalk Film Festival	Honorable Mention for Acting	Freeland	Won
2021	Fargo Film Festival	Best Actress	Freeland	Won
2021	RiverRun International Film Festival	Best Actress	Freeland	Won
