= 2020 New York Film Festival =

58th edition

- Opening film: Lovers Rock
- Closing film: French Exit
- Location: New York City, United States
- Founded: 1963
- Founded by: Richard Roud and Amos Vogel
- Hosted by: Film at Lincoln Center
- Artistic director: Dennis Lim
- Festival date: September 17 – October 11, 2020
- Website: https://www.filmlinc.org/nyff2020/

New York Film Festival
- 2021 2019

The 58th New York Film Festival took place from September 17 to October 11, 2020. Due to the COVID-19 pandemic in the United States, the festival was held virtually across the country and at drive-ins throughout New York City.

It marked Dennis Lim first year as artistic director of the festival.

Steve McQueen's Lovers Rock was the opening film. Chloé Zhao's Nomadland was festival's centerpiece. Azazel Jacobs' French Exit was the closing film.

Appearing in the NYFF's "Main Slate" for the first time are Eugène Green, Déa Kulumbegashvili, Song Fang, Chaitanya Tamhane, Azazel Jacobs, Viktor Kossakovsky, Heidi Ewing, Matías Piñeiro, Sam Pollard, Philippe Lacôte, Garrett Bradley, Yulene Olaizola, Michael Dweck and Gregory Kershaw.

World premieres included Azazel Jacobs's French Exit, Steve McQueen's Lovers Rock, Mangrove and Red, White and Blue, David Dufresne's The Monopoly of Violence and Sofia Coppola's On the Rocks.

== Official Selections ==
=== Main slate ===
The following films were selected to the "Main Slate" section of the Festival:

English Title	Original Title	Director(s)	Production Country
Atarrabi and Mikelats	Atarrabi et Mikelats	Eugène Green	Belgium, France
Beginning	დასაწყისი	Dea Kulumbegashvili	Georgia
The Calming		Song Fang	China
City Hall		Frederick Wiseman	United States
Days	日子	Tsai Ming-liang	Taiwan
The Disciple		Chaitanya Tamhane	India
French Exit (closing film)		Azazel Jacobs	United Kingdom, Canada
Gunda		Viktor Kossakovsky	United States, Norway
I Carry You with Me	Te Llevo Conmigo	Heidi Ewing	United States, Mexico
Isabella		Matías Piñeiro	Argentina
Lovers Rock (opening film)		Steve McQueen	United Kingdom
Malmkrog		Cristi Puiu	Romania
Mangrove		Steve McQueen	United Kingdom
MLK/FBI		Sam Pollard	United States
Night of the Kings	La Nuit des rois	Philippe Lacôte	France, Côte d'Ivoire, Canada, Senegal
Nomadland (centerpiece)		Chloé Zhao	United States
Notturno		Gianfranco Rosi	Italy
Red, White and Blue		Steve McQueen	United Kingdom
The Salt of Tears	Le Sel des larmes	Philippe Garrel	France
Swimming Out Till the Sea Turns Blue	一直游到海水变蓝	Jia Zhangke	China
Time		Garrett Bradley	United States
Tragic Jungle	Selva trágica	Yulene Olaizola	Mexico
The Truffle Hunters		Michael Dweck and Gregory Kershaw	United States, Greece, Italy
Undine		Christian Petzold	Germany
The Woman Who Ran	도망친 여자	Hong Sang-soo	South Korea

=== Spotlight ===
The following films were selected for the Spotlight section:

English Title	Original Title	Director(s)	Production Country
All In: The Fight for Democracy		Liz Garbus and Lisa Cortés	United States
David Byrne's American Utopia		Spike Lee	United States
Hopper/Welles		Orson Welles	United States
The Human Voice (short)		Pedro Almodóvar	Spain
The Monopoly of Violence	Un pays qui se tient sage	David Dufresne	France
On the Rocks		Sofia Coppola	United States

=== Currents ===
The following films were selected for the Currents section:

English title	Original title	Director(s)	Production country
Apparition		Ismaïl Bahri	Tunisia, France
Fauna	Flora y fauna	Nicolás Pereda	Mexico, Canada
Her Name Was Europa		Anja Dornieden, Juan David González Monroy	Germany
Her Socialist Smile		John Gianvito	United States
Hidden (short)		Jafar Panahi	France
The Inheritance		Ephraim Asili	United States
Its Distorting Mirror		Raúl Ruiz and Valeria Sarmiento	Chile
King of Sanwi		Akosua Adoma Owusu	United States, Ghana
The Last City		Heinz Emigholz	Germany
The Lobby		Heinz Emigholz	Germany, Argentina
My Mexican Bretzel		Nuria Giménez	Spain
Ouvertures		The Living and the Dead Ensemble	United Kingdom, France
The Plastic House		Alison Chhorn	Australia
A Revolt Without Images		Pilar Monsell	Spain
Slow Machine		Joe DeNardo and Paul Felten	United States
The Tango of the Widower		Raúl Ruiz and Valeria Sarmiento	Chile
There Are Not Thirty-Six Ways of Showing a Man Getting on a Horse	No existen treinta y seis maneras de mostrar cómo un hombre se sube a un caballo	Nicolás Zukerfeld	Argentina
This Day Won't Last		Mouaad el Salem	Tunisia, Belgium
Untitled Sequence of Gaps		Vika Kirchenbauer	Germany
The Works and Days		C.W. Winter and Anders Edström	United States, Sweden, Japan, United Kingdom
The Year of the Discovery		Luis López Carrasco	Spain

=== Revivals ===
The following films were selected to the Revivals section:

English Title	Original Title	Director(s)	Production Country
Chess of the Wind (1976)	شطرنج باد	Mohammad Reza Aslani	Iran
Climax (2018)		Gaspar Noé	France, Belgium
Damnation (1988)	Kárhozat	Béla Tarr	Hungary
Flowers of Shanghai (1998)	海上花	Hou Hsiao-hsien	Taiwan
The Hourglass Sanatorium (1973)	Sanatorium pod klepsydrą	Wojciech Has	Poland
In the Mood for Love (2000)	花樣年華	Wong Kar-wai	Hong Kong
Meeting the Man: James Baldwin in Paris		Terence Dixon	United Kingdom, France
Muhammad Ali, the Greatest		William Klein	France
Salò, or the 120 Days of Sodom (1975)	Salò o le 120 giornate di Sodoma	Pier Paolo Pasolini	Italy, France
Simone Barbes or Virtue	Simone Barbès ou la vertu	Marie-Claude Treilhou	France
Smooth Talk (1985)		Joyce Chopra	United States
The Spook Who Sat by the Door (1973)		Ivan Dixon	United States
Xiao Wu (Pickpocket) (1998)	小武	Jia Zhangke	China
Zero for Conduct (1933)	Zéro de conduite	Jean Vigo	France

=== Short films ===
The following short films were selected:

English Title	Original Title	Director(s)	Production Country
Apiyemiyekî?		Ana Vaz	Brazil, France, Portugal, Netherlands
Aquí y allá		Melisa Liebenthal	Argentina, France
An Arrow Pointing to a Hole		Steve Reinke	United States, Canada
August 22, This Year		Graham Foy	Canada
Autoficcion		Laida Lertxundi	Spain, United States, New Zealand
The Chicken		Neo Sora	United States
Claudette's Star		Ayo Akingbade	United Kingdom
Correspondence		Carla Simón and Dominga Sotomayor	Spain/Chile
Drills		Sarah Friedland	United States
Ekphrasis		Riccardo Giacconi	Italy
The End of Suffering (a proposal)		Jacqueline Lentzou	Greece
Episodes – Spring 2018		Mathilde Girard	France
Extractions		Thirza Cuthand	Canada
Figure Minus Fact		Mary Helena Clark	United States
– force –		Simon Liu and Jennie MaryTai Liu	Hong Kong, United States
Glimpses from a Visit to Orkney in Summer 1995		Ute Aurand	Germany
Hard, Cracked the Wind		Mark Jenkin	United Kingdom
Humongous!		Aya Kawazoe	Japan
In Sudden Darkness		Tayler Montague	United States
In the Air Tonight		Andrew Norman Wilson	United States
The Isolated		Jay Giampietro	United States
Labor of Love		Sylvia Schedelbauer	Germany
Letter From Your Far-Off Country		Suneil Sanzgiri	United States, India
Look Then Below		Ben Rivers	United Kingdom
Malembe		Luis Arnías	Venezuela, United States
A Night at the Opera		Sergei Loznitsa	France
Notes, Imprints (On Love): Part I		Alexandra Cuesta	United States, Ecuador
Object Lessons, or: What Happened Whitsunday		Ricky D'Ambrose	United States
Once Removed		Lawrence Abu Hamdan	Lebanon
Point and Line to Plane		Sofia Bohdanowicz	Canada
Sanfield		Kevin Jerome Everson	United States
See You in My Dreams		Shun Ikezoe	Japan
Shots in the Dark with David Godlis		Noah Kloster and Lewie Kloster	United States
Single Copy		Hsu Che-Yu	Taiwan
Stump the Guesser		Guy Maddin, Evan Johnson and Galen Johnson	Canada
To the Harbour		Anonymous	Hong Kong
Trust Study #1		Shobun Baile	United States
The Unseen River		Phạm Ngọc Lân	Vietnam, Laos
While Cursed by Specters		Burak Çevik	Turkey
Wild Bill Horsecock		Oliver Shahery	United States
