= French Exit =

French Exit may refer to:

- French leave, an unannounced departure
- French Exit (1995 film), American film
- French Exit (album), 2014 album by TV Girl
- French Exit (novel), 2018 novel by Patrick deWitt
- French Exit (2020 film), based on the novel
- "French Exit", a song by The Antlers from the album Burst Apart, 2011
- "French Exit", a song by Dua Lipa from the album Radical Optimism, 2024
