= Undermajordomo Minor =

2015 novel by Patrick deWitt

- Cover of first edition (Canada)
- Author: Patrick deWitt
- Audio read by: Simon Prebble
- Cover artist: Dan Stiles
- Language: English
- Publisher: House of Anansi Press
- Publication date: September 5, 2015 (hardcover)
- Publication place: Canada
- Media type: Print (hardcover and paperback), e-book, audio
- Pages: 352 (hardcover)
- ISBN: 978-1-77089-414-3 (hardcover)
- OCLC: 907967739

Undermajordomo Minor is a 2015 novel by Canadian-born author Patrick deWitt. It is his third novel and was published by House of Anansi Press on September 5, 2015. The novel is a gothic fable set in an unspecified time and location that has been compared to 19th-century Central and Eastern Europe.

It was longlisted for the 2015 Scotiabank Giller Prize. Sophie Voillot's French translation was a finalist for the 2017 Governor General's Award for English to French translation.

== Influences ==
Patrick deWitt credits numerous writers and artists in the novel's acknowledgements as his influences while writing the book, including Thomas Bernhard, Ivy Compton-Burnett, Italo Calvino, Dennis Cooper, Robert Coover, Roald Dahl, J. P. Donleavy, C.F., Knut Hamsun, Sammy Harkham, Werner Herzog, Bohumil Hrabal, Shirley Jackson, Pär Lagerkvist, Harry Mathews, Steven Millhauser, Jean Rhys, Robert Walser, and Eudora Welty.

== Publication ==
Undermajordomo Minor was published on September 3, 2015, in the United Kingdom (Granta Books), September 5, 2015 in Canada (House of Anansi Press), and on September 15, 2015, in the United States (Ecco Press). Dan Stiles made the cover artwork for the UK and Canada editions, and Sara Wood made the US edition cover art.

== Reception ==
In his review for The New York Times, author Daniel Handler praised deWitt for subverting genres in the novel and wrote that it "offers the same delights as the fairy tales and adventure stories it takes on".

Colin Dwyer of NPR also praised deWitt's genre blending and the character of Lucien Minor for giving the novel a "genuine earnestness", but criticized the novel's pacing for being rushed.

Writing for The Guardian, novelist Liz Jensen felt elements of the novel's plot were often predictable and criticized the protagonist Lucy for lacking the "complexity and nuance" of Eli from The Sisters Brothers, but nonetheless praised the success of the novel's backdrop and deWitt's "frolicsome chain of intrigues".

In his review for The Washington Post, author Glen David Gold criticized the novel's narrative for not having the "nimbleness" of other similar folk tales which also experimented with structure, but concluded his review with praise for the protagonist and the world conjured by deWitt.

Steve Nathans-Kelly of Paste gave the novel an 8.5 out of 10 rating, writing, "deWitt has somehow created a fable in which the comic narrative voice is impossibly accomplished, and nearly every word is funny."

Chris Feliciano Arnold of the SFGate felt the novel's characters lacked the "emotional weight" of those in The Sisters Brothers.

== Film adaptation ==
In October 2016, director Kelly Reichardt revealed that for her next film she would be collaborating with author DeWitt in an adaptation of Undermajordomo Minor, which could possibly be shot outside of the U.S. In October 2018, it was announced Reichardt had put Undermajordomo Minor on hold and would instead reunite with Jon Raymond to direct First Cow, an adaptation of his novel The Half-Life.
