= Gotham Independent Film Awards 2024 =

Annual US film awards ceremony

34th Annual Gotham Awards
- Date: December 2, 2024
- Location: Cipriani Wall Street, New York
- Country: United States
- Presented by: The Gotham Film & Media Institute

Highlights
- Most wins: Nickel Boys and Sing Sing (2)
- Most nominations: Anora (4)
- Best Feature: A Different Man
- Best Director: RaMell Ross – Nickel Boys

The 34th Annual Gotham Awards, presented by the Gotham Film & Media Institute, were held on December 2, 2024. The nominees were announced on October 29, 2024.

Angelina Jolie, Denis Villeneuve, Timothée Chalamet, James Mangold, Zendaya, the cast of the film The Piano Lesson, Franklin Leonard and his company The Black List, and the cast of the film Sing Sing received tribute awards.

== Ceremony information ==
Compared to the previous year, this ceremony included two additional competitive categories: An award for Best Director was given out for the first time, while the award for Breakthrough Performer, which had already been presented between 1998 and 2022, returned. Additionally, with the creation of the separate Gotham TV Awards in 2024, the Gotham Awards exclusively include film awards; all TV award categories, which were presented at the Gotham Awards until last year's ceremony, are given out at the Gotham TV Awards going forward.

== Winners and nominees ==
Best Feature: A Different Man; Anora; Babygirl; Challengers; Nickel Boys	Best Screenplay: His Three Daughters – Azazel Jacobs; Between the Temples – C. Mason Wells and Nathan Silver; Evil Does Not Exist – Ryusuke Hamaguchi; Femme – Sam H. Freeman and Ng Choon Ping; Janet Planet – Annie Baker
Best Documentary Feature: No Other Land; Dahomey; Intercepted; Soundtrack to a Coup d'Etat; Sugarcane; Union	Best International Feature: All We Imagine as Light; Green Border; Hard Truths; Inside the Yellow Cocoon Shell; Vermiglio
Best Director: RaMell Ross – Nickel Boys; Payal Kapadia – All We Imagine as Light; Sean Baker – Anora; Guan Hu – Black Dog; Jane Schoenbrun – I Saw the TV Glow	Breakthrough Director: Vera Drew – The People's Joker; Shuchi Talati – Girls Will Be Girls; India Donaldson – Good One; Alessandra Lacorazza – In the Summers; Mahdi Fleifel – To a Land Unknown
Outstanding Lead Performance: Colman Domingo – Sing Sing as John "Divine G" Whitfield; Pamela Anderson – The Last Showgirl as Shelley; Adrien Brody – The Brutalist as László Tóth; Marianne Jean-Baptiste – Hard Truths as Pansy; Nicole Kidman – Babygirl as Romy Mathis; Keith Kupferer – Ghostlight as Dan Mueller; Mikey Madison – Anora as Anora "Ani" Mikheeva; Demi Moore – The Substance as Elisabeth Sparkle; Saoirse Ronan – The Outrun as Rona; Justice Smith – I Saw the TV Glow as Owen	Outstanding Supporting Performance: Clarence Maclin – Sing Sing as himself; Yura Borisov – Anora as Igor; Kieran Culkin – A Real Pain as Benji Kaplan; Danielle Deadwyler – The Piano Lesson as Berniece Charles; Jack Haven – I Saw the TV Glow as Maddy; Brian Tyree Henry – The Fire Inside as Jason Crutchfield; Natasha Lyonne – His Three Daughters as Rachel Brodsky; Katy O'Brian – Love Lies Bleeding as Jackie Cleaver; Guy Pearce – The Brutalist as Harrison Lee Van Buren; Adam Pearson – A Different Man as Oswald
Breakthrough Performer: Brandon Wilson – Nickel Boys as Turner; Lily Collias – Good One as Sam; Ryan Destiny – The Fire Inside as Claressa "T-Rex" Shields; Maisy Stella – My Old Ass as Elliott; Izaac Wang – Dìdi as Chris Wang

=== Films with multiple wins and nominations ===
Film that received multiple wins
Wins	Film
2	Nickel Boys
2	Sing Sing

Films that received multiple nominations
Nominations	Film
4	Anora
3	I Saw the TV Glow
3	Nickel Boys
2	All We Imagine as Light
2	Babygirl
2	The Brutalist
2	A Different Man
2	The Fire Inside
2	Good One
2	Hard Truths
2	His Three Daughters
2	Sing Sing

== Special awards ==
=== Director Tribute ===
- Denis Villeneuve – Dune: Part Two

=== Performer Tribute ===
- Angelina Jolie – Maria

=== Ensemble Tribute ===
- The Piano Lesson – John David Washington, Samuel L. Jackson, Ray Fisher, Danielle Deadwyler, Michael Potts, Corey Hawkins, and Erykah Badu

=== Anniversary Tribute ===
- Franklin Leonard and The Black List

=== Social Justice Tribute ===
- Sing Sing

=== Visionary Tribute ===
- Timothée Chalamet and James Mangold – A Complete Unknown

=== Spotlight Tribute ===
- Zendaya – Challengers
