= The GoodTimesKid =

2005 comedy and drama film

The GoodTimesKid is a 2005 American minimalist comedy/drama film starring Sara Diaz and Azazel Jacobs. Jacobs also directed the film. The DVD is distributed by Benten Films.

== Plot ==
Rodolfo Cano is a hot-tempered slacker living in Echo Park with his free-spirited girlfriend, Diaz, with whom he has a tumultuous relationship. On the morning of his birthday, they have a fight, and Rodolfo impulsively enlists in the army to escape his sense of ennui. However, his call-for-service letter erroneously ends up getting mailed to another man with the same name ("Rodolfo II"), a quiet and stoic loner living nearby in a boat. Upon learning of the mistake, Rodolfo II is instructed to visit the local recruitment center to correct it. At the venue, he encounters Rodolfo I, who leaves his home address for an army bus to pick him up on the following morning. Rodolfo II, initially unaware they share the same name, confronts Rodolfo I, but the latter flees without an explanation.

Rodolfo II follows the other Rodolfo to his house, where he overhears Rodolfo I instigating another fight with Diaz after he discovers that she has decorated their house for his birthday party. Diaz expresses frustration that she is constantly trying to make an effort for him, only to receive nothing in response. Rodolfo I storms out of the house, and Diaz notices Rodolfo II standing outside. She invites him inside, where Rodolfo II examines the house and discovers that Rodolfo I has an apparently unused master's degree in journalism. Diaz destroys the cake meant for her boyfriend, cathartically assaults the fridge, and then, noticing Rodolfo II's downbeat attitude, performs an old-timey dance for him. As guests for the party begin to arrive, Diaz receives a phone call from a city bar, where Rodolfo I is drunkenly provoking fights with patrons.

Diaz departs to retrieve Rodolfo I, but reneges when she watches him leave the bar with another woman. She then sees that Rodolfo II has followed her to the bar, and at first attacks him, then later relents and chases after him when he escapes onto a bus. They arrive at the beach where he lives, and Diaz encourages him to go for a swim with her before they board his boat. After Diaz learns that he was once a sailor, he attempts to tell her that her boyfriend is also enlisting in the army, but she refuses to believe him. They are then interrupted by Rodolfo II's aggressive ex-girlfriend, who they hide from in the darkness as she begs him to reunite with her. After she leaves, Diaz confesses her dissatisfaction with life and proposes that she and Rodolfo II run off together. Rodolfo II does not answer, but does drive her home so that she can pack a suitcase.

As she enters, Rodolfo I, who has trashed the house with the woman from the bar, wakes up and leaves out the window before they can encounter each other. He encounters Rodolfo II, who is waiting in his car outside, and the two take a walk together, where Rodolfo I admits that he has made many mistakes, and believes that Diaz is too good for him. Meanwhile, Diaz packs her bags, breaks some of Rodolfo I's favorite records, and returns to Rodolfo II's car and falls asleep while waiting for his return. When the men come back, Rodolfo I invites Rodolfo II inside to listen to a record that insinuates Rodolfo II's interest in Diaz is only due to lust, not love, because of the loneliness and depression in his life.

He falls asleep, and Rodolfo II exits the house. Outside, the army bus has arrived, and without saying goodbye to the sleeping Diaz, Rodolfo II takes the other's place on the bus and departs. Diaz wakes some time later to see the woman from the bar departing, and she enters the ruined house, putting the record on again before sitting across from Rodolfo I in quiet contemplation.

== Production ==
The movie was shot in Echo Park, Los Angeles and filmed entirely on film left over from a larger budget picture.

== Reception ==
The GoodTimesKid garnered generally positive reviews and currently holds a 78% (positive) rating on rottentomatoes based on 9 reviews.
