= Gotham Independent Film Award for Best Screenplay =

Annual US film award

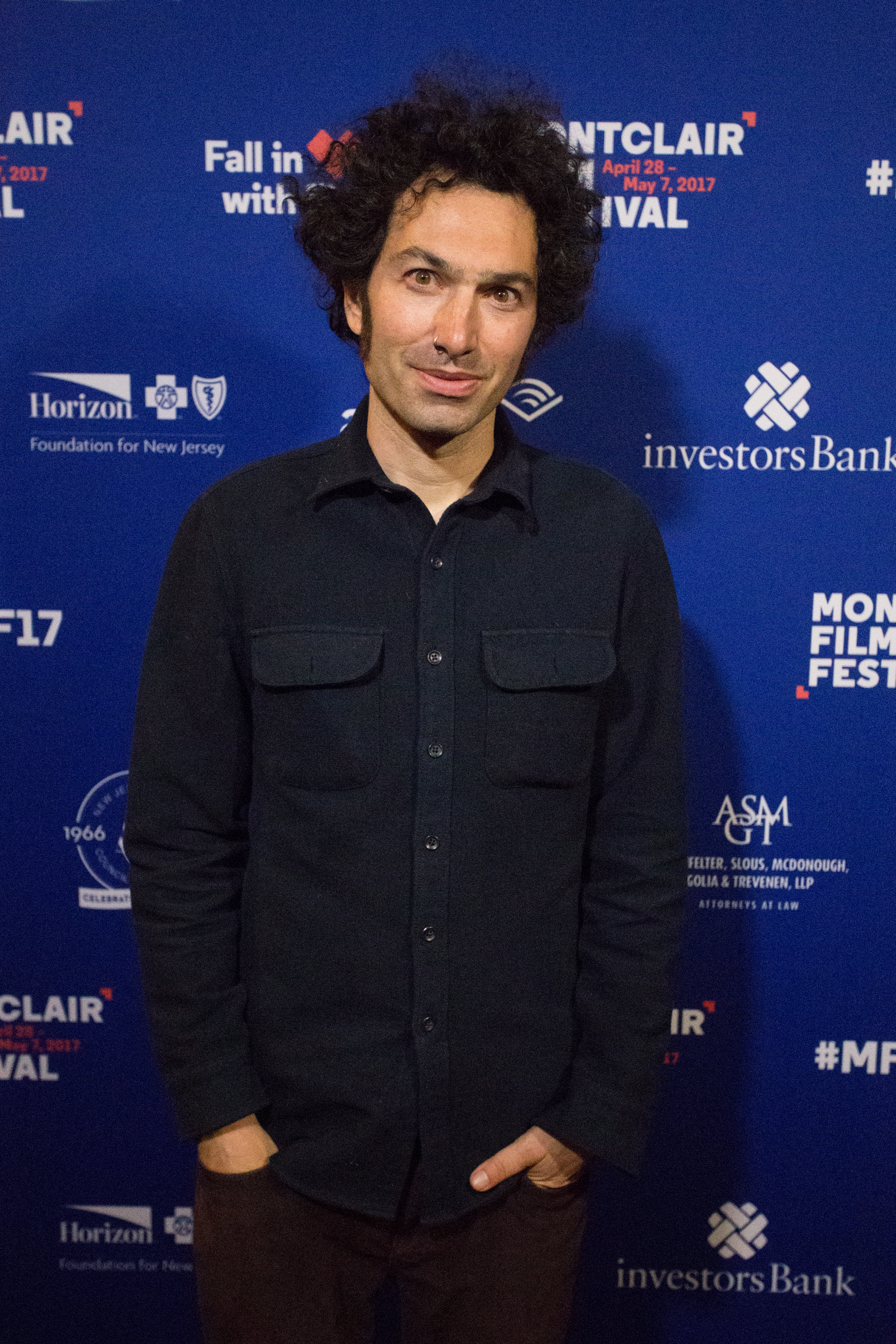
- The 2024 recipient: Azazel Jacobs
- Country: United States
- Presented by: The Gotham Film & Media Institute
- First award: 2015
- Final award: 2024
- Website: awards.thegotham.org

The Gotham Independent Film Award for Best Screenplay was one of the annual Gotham Independent Film Awards. It was presented between 2015 and 2024 until it was replaced in 2025 with the Best Original Screenplay and Best Adapted Screenplay categories.

== Winners and nominees ==
=== 2010s ===
Year	Screenwriter(s)	Film	Ref.
2015	Tom McCarthy and Josh Singer	Spotlight	
2015	Noah Baumbach	While We're Young	
2015	Marielle Heller	The Diary of a Teenage Girl	
2015	Michael Alan Lerner and Oren Moverman	Love & Mercy	
2015	Phyllis Nagy	Carol	
2016	Barry Jenkins and Tarell Alvin McCraney	Moonlight	
2016	Jim Jarmusch	Paterson	
2016	Kenneth Lonergan	Manchester by the Sea	
2016	Taylor Sheridan	Hell or High Water	
2016	Whit Stillman	Love & Friendship	
2017	Jordan Peele	Get Out	
2017	Greta Gerwig	Lady Bird	
2017	Emily V. Gordon and Kumail Nanjiani	The Big Sick	
2017	James Ivory	Call Me by Your Name	
2017	Kogonada	Columbus	
2017	Mike White	Brad's Status	
2018	Paul Schrader	First Reformed	
2018	Andrew Bujalski	Support the Girls	
2018	Deborah Davis and Tony McNamara	The Favourite	
2018	Cory Finley	Thoroughbreds	
2018	Tamara Jenkins	Private Life	
2019	Noah Baumbach	Marriage Story	
2019	Ari Aster	Midsommar	
2019	Jimmie Fails, Joe Talbot and Robert Richert	The Last Black Man in San Francisco	
2019	Tarell Alvin McCraney	High Flying Bird	
2019	Lulu Wang	The Farewell	

=== 2020s ===
Year	Screenwriter(s)	Film	Ref.
2020	Radha Blank	The Forty-Year-Old Version	
2020	Dan Sallitt	Fourteen	
2020	Mike Makowsky	Bad Education	
2020	James Montague and Craig W. Sander	The Vast of Night	
2020	Jon Raymond and Kelly Reichardt	First Cow	
2021	Maggie Gyllenhaal	The Lost Daughter	
2021	Sean Baker and Chris Bergoch	Red Rocket	
2021	Rebecca Hall	Passing	
2021	David Lowery	The Green Knight	
2021	Paul Schrader	The Card Counter	
2021	Amalia Ulman	El Planeta	
2022	Todd Field	Tár	
2022	Lena Dunham	Catherine Called Birdy	
2022	James Gray	Armageddon Time	
2022	Kogonada	After Yang	
2022	Sarah Polley	Women Talking	
2023	Justine Triet and Arthur Harari	Anatomy of a Fall	
2023	Samy Burch and Alex Mechanik	May December	
2023	Jonathan Glazer	The Zone of Interest	
2023	Andrew Haigh	All of Us Strangers	
2023	Cristian Mungiu	R.M.N.	
2024	Azazel Jacobs	His Three Daughters	
2024	Annie Baker	Janet Planet	
2024	Sam H. Freeman and Ng Choon Ping	Femme	
2024	Ryusuke Hamaguchi	Evil Does Not Exist	
2024	Nathan Silver and C. Mason Wells	Between the Temples	

== See also ==
- Academy Award for Best Original Screenplay
- Academy Award for Best Adapted Screenplay
- AACTA International Award for Best Screenplay
- BAFTA Award for Best Original Screenplay
- BAFTA Award for Best Adapted Screenplay
- Critics' Choice Movie Award for Best Screenplay
- Golden Globe Award for Best Screenplay
- Independent Spirit Award for Best Screenplay
- Independent Spirit Award for Best First Screenplay
- Writers Guild of America Award for Best Original Screenplay
- Writers Guild of America Award for Best Adapted Screenplay
