= Panic Carefully =

- Directed by: Sam Esmail
- Written by: Sam Esmail
- Produced by: Sam Esmail; Chad Hamilton; Scott Stuber; Julia Roberts; Marisa Yeres Gill; Lisa Gillan
- Starring: Julia Roberts; Elizabeth Olsen; Eddie Redmayne; Brian Tyree Henry; Joe Alwyn; Ben Chaplin; Aidan Gillen
- Cinematography: Tod Campbell
- Edited by: Barney Pilling
- Music by: Volker Bertelmann
- Production companies: Bluegrass 7; Esmail Corp; Red Om Films
- Distributed by: Warner Bros. Pictures
- Release date: April 9, 2027
- Country: United States
- Language: English
- Budget: $60 million

Panic Carefully is an upcoming American thriller film written and directed by Sam Esmail. It stars Julia Roberts, Elizabeth Olsen, Eddie Redmayne, Brian Tyree Henry, Joe Alwyn, Aidan Gillen, and Ben Chaplin.

Panic Carefully is scheduled to be released in the United States on April 9, 2027.

== Cast ==
- Julia Roberts
- Elizabeth Olsen
- Eddie Redmayne
- Brian Tyree Henry
- Joe Alwyn
- Ben Chaplin
- Aidan Gillen
- Naledi Murray
- Sebastian Orozco
- Wilf Scolding

== Production ==
In February 2024, it was announced that Sam Esmail and Julia Roberts were set to reunite on the film, with studios Netflix, Paramount Pictures and Warner Bros. Pictures in the running to acquire the project. Warner Bros. won the distribution bid in December, with Elizabeth Olsen and Eddie Redmayne joining the cast. Brian Tyree Henry would enter final negotiations to join the cast the same month. In January 2025, Ben Chaplin, Aidan Gillen, Joe Alwyn, Naledi Murray and Sebastian Orozco would be added to the cast, with Henry confirmed for his role.

Principal photography began in London in January 2025. Scenes were shot in Canary Wharf in February, with the location redressed to appear as Manhattan.

== Music ==
Volker Bertelmann revealed he was composing the score for the film in a September 2025 interview.

== Release ==
Panic Carefully is scheduled to be released in theatres and IMAX by Warner Bros. Pictures in the United States on April 9, 2027. It was previously scheduled to be released on February 26, 2027, but swapped release dates with The Revenge of La Llorona.
