= Love & Death (miniseries) =

2023 American biographical crime drama television miniseries

- Promotional poster
- Genre: Biographical; Crime drama
- Created by: David E. Kelley
- Based on: Evidence of Love: A True Story of Passion and Death in the Suburbs "Love & Death In Silicon Prairie, Part I & II" by: Jim Atkinson; John Bloom
- Written by: David E. Kelley
- Directed by: Lesli Linka Glatter; Clark Johnson
- Starring: Elizabeth Olsen; Jesse Plemons; Lily Rabe; Patrick Fugit; Krysten Ritter; Tom Pelphrey; Elizabeth Marvel; Keir Gilchrist
- Opening theme: "Don't Let Me Be Misunderstood" by Nina Simone
- Composer: Jeff Russo
- Country of origin: United States
- Original language: English
- No. of episodes: 7

Production
- Executive producers: Michael Klick; Helen Verno; Matthew Tinker; Nicole Kidman; Per Saari; Lesli Linka Glatter; David E. Kelley; Scott Brown; Megan Creydt
- Producer: Sunday Stevens
- Cinematography: Tim Ives; John Conroy
- Editors: Ben Lester; Amy E. Duddleston; Dorian Harris
- Running time: 45–58 minutes
- Production companies: David E. Kelley Productions; Blossom Films; Whatever Lola Wants Productions; Lionsgate Television

Original release
- Network: HBO Max
- Release: April 27 – May 18, 2023
- Network: Max
- Release: May 25, 2023

Love & Death is an American biographical crime drama miniseries directed by Lesli Linka Glatter and Clark Johnson, written by David E. Kelley that premiered on April 27, 2023, on HBO Max. (Note: Love & Death premiered on HBO Max, which was rebranded as Max between release dates of episodes 6 and 7.) It stars Elizabeth Olsen, Jesse Plemons, Lily Rabe, Patrick Fugit, Krysten Ritter, Tom Pelphrey, Elizabeth Marvel, and Keir Gilchrist.

The series is based on the true story of Candy Montgomery, a housewife from Wylie, Texas. It centers around Montgomery, who is living a stereotypical housewife lifestyle in the late 1970s. She has to go before a jury after an affair with her friend from church leads to a killing.

The series received mainly positive reviews, praising its performances (particularly Olsen's), its cinematography and set pieces, and its take on Montgomery, finding humanity in her. On June 1, 2023, Max announced that Love & Death had become their most watched original limited series globally. At the 75th Primetime Emmy Awards, Plemons was nominated for an Outstanding Supporting Actor in a Limited or Anthology Series or Movie.

== Premise ==
In Wylie, Texas, 1980s suburban housewife, Candy Montgomery is accused of murdering her neighbor Betty Gore, after having an affair with Gore's husband Allan.

== Cast and characters ==
=== Main ===
- Elizabeth Olsen as Candy Montgomery
- Jesse Plemons as Allan Gore
- Lily Rabe as Betty Gore
- Patrick Fugit as Pat Montgomery
- Krysten Ritter as Sherry Cleckler
- Tom Pelphrey as Don Crowder
- Elizabeth Marvel as Jackie Ponder
- Keir Gilchrist as Ron Adams

=== Recurring ===
- Amelie Dallimore as Jenny Montgomery
- Liam Pileggi as Ian Montgomery
- Harper Heath as Alisa Gore
- Olivia Applegate as Carol Crowder
- Jennifer Neala Page as Betty Huffhines
- Kira Pozehl as Elaine Williams
- Bonnie Gayle Sparks as Jo Ann Garlington
- Aaron Jay Rome as Richard Garlington
- Sara Burke as Barbara Green
- Richard C. Jones as Tom Cleckler
- Matthew Posey as Bob Pomeroy

=== Guest ===
- Fabiola Andújar as Mary Adams
- Brian d'Arcy James as Dr. Fred Fason
- Mackenzie Astin as Tom O'Connell
- Adam Cropper as Robert Udashen
- Bruce McGill as Judge Tom Ryan
- Drew Waters as Jerry McMahan
- Sunday Dangerstone as Tina Grant
- Charlie Talbert as Lester Gayler
- Robert Walden as Dr. Irving Stone
- Brad Leland as Chief Royce Abbott
- Boo Arnold as Texas Ranger GW Burks
- Dave Maldonado as Detective Jim Cochran
- Chris Freihofer as Agent Joe Murphy
- Christin Sawyer Davis as Elaine Carpenter
- Beth Broderick as Bertha Pomeroy
- Deke Anderson as Dr. Vincent DiMaio

== Production ==
It was announced in May 2021 that HBO Max had greenlit the miniseries, with Elizabeth Olsen set to star. Jesse Plemons joined the cast later in the month. In June, Patrick Fugit was added to the cast, with Lily Rabe, Keir Gilchrist, Elizabeth Marvel, Tom Pelphrey and Krysten Ritter joining in the following months.

On-location shooting took place in Austin, Texas, and surrounding areas to include La Grange, Coupland, Georgetown, Hutto, Seguin, Kerrville, Lockhart, Killeen, Smithville, Buda and San Marcos.

== Release ==
Love & Death premiered on HBO Max on April 27, 2023, with the first three episodes available immediately and the rest debuting on a weekly basis until May 25. In the UK, the series premiered on September 7, 2023, on ITV's on-demand streaming platform, ITVX, followed by a linear television premiere on ITV1 on July 20, 2024.

== Episodes ==
No.	Title	Directed by	Written by	Original release date
1	"The Huntress"	Lesli Linka Glatter	David E. Kelley	April 27, 2023
In 1978 Wylie, Texas, Candy Montgomery is a loving wife and mother, but finds herself dissatisfied with her life. She is attracted to Allan Gore, a married member of her church group, whose own marriage is strained while he and his wife Betty struggle to get pregnant with their second child. Candy confesses to Allan, who returns her interest, but he is nervous and insists that they weigh the risks carefully. Candy's pastor, Jackie, tries to talk her out of it, to no avail. Candy and Allan have multiple meetings to discuss their potential affair, with both agreeing that if either of them becomes too emotionally involved, they will break it off. In December 1978, they begin their affair in a motel room near Dallas.
2	"Encounters"	Lesli Linka Glatter	David E. Kelley	April 27, 2023
Candy and Allan continue their affair for months and grow closer after meeting at different motels and following a similar ritual of picnic lunches, lovemaking, and showering together. Both of them admit that they are falling in love, but continue to see each other, especially as Betty's depression makes her difficult for Allan to deal with. After Betty gives birth, Allan decides to slow down the affair and focus on his family, which upsets Candy. Allan and Betty's relationship recovers after they go to Marriage Encounter, a church-sponsored marriage counseling retreat in Dallas. Pastor Jackie leaves the parish, and is replaced by new arrival Ron Adams, who does not connect with his community.
3	"Stepping Stone"	Lesli Linka Glatter	David E. Kelley	April 27, 2023
In October 1979, Allan ends the affair. Candy is upset at first, but then decides to work on her marriage with Pat and they also attend Marriage Encounter. Betty starts to suspect something happened between Candy and Allan. Pat learns about the affair after finding a secret love letter and confronts Candy, but the two reconcile. The Montgomerys distance themselves from the Gores, who, additionally, have left Ron's church group. On June 13, 1980, Betty, who suspects she is pregnant again, is anxious when Allan leaves on a work trip. Candy goes to the Gores' house to pick up a swimsuit for Betty's daughter. Betty asks Candy about the affair; when Candy confirms it, Betty confronts her with a large axe.
4	"Do No Evil"	Lesli Linka Glatter	David E. Kelley	May 4, 2023
The women are passive aggressive with each other before Betty picks up the axe and attacks Candy. Candy leaves the house at a later time with visible cuts and bruises, her clothes soaking wet, and returns home so she can put on fresh clothes and go about her day as if nothing had happened. Pat and Sherry, Candy's friend, notice that Candy's behavior is odd. From his business trip to Minnesota, Allan is unable to contact Betty. He calls their neighbors and asks them to break into the house, where they find Betty's bloody body. The police, and the Wylie community, assume that Betty was attacked by a stranger. Candy, the last person to see Betty alive, is questioned by the police about the shoes she was wearing. She destroys the thongs she wore during the murder. Allan confesses to the police that he had had an affair with Candy.
5	"The Arrest"	Clark Johnson	David E. Kelley	May 11, 2023
Candy is questioned again by the police; she admits that she had an affair with Allan, but coolly insists on her innocence of Betty's murder. Candy engages Don Crowder, a member of her church group, as her lawyer, and confides in him that she killed Betty after Betty "came at" her. Candy's arrest warrant is served and she is kept overnight in county jail despite Don's efforts to get her out on bond. Journalists sensationalize the case, swaying public opinion against Candy. At pretrial, Don antagonizes Judge Ryan and fails to change the location of the trial. At Don's recommendation, Candy visits psychiatrist Dr. Fred Fason, who uses hypnosis to explore Candy's suppressed feelings about Betty's murder. Pat chafes at being kept out of the loop, until, at Candy's request, Don tells him the truth of Candy's guilt.
6	"The Big Top"	Clark Johnson	David E. Kelley	May 18, 2023
At jury selection, Don announces that Candy did kill Betty, but in self-defense. The trial begins. Allan takes the stand and is questioned about Betty's anxiety and depression, and his affair with Candy. Throughout the trial, Candy takes Serax against Don's advice; he fears that her lack of response makes her appear unfeeling to the jury. Pastor Ron speaks ably to the media on Candy's behalf. Through questioning the prosecution's witnesses, Don is able to argue that the murder was not premeditated, but it is difficult to explain away the pathologist's testimony of the 40 brutal axe strikes Candy made to Betty's body. Judge Ryan orders Don to call the first defense witness ahead of schedule; Don asks for a delay, as Candy is still medicated, but Judge Ryan gives them just ten minutes to prepare.
7	"Ssssshh"	Lesli Linka Glatter	David E. Kelley	May 25, 2023
Candy takes the stand and recounts the events of Betty's murder, including how Betty attacked her first and how she lost control once she started hitting Betty with the axe. Dr. Fason takes the stand and testifies his opinion that Candy initially acted in self-defense, then had a dissociative reaction triggered by repressed childhood trauma that caused her to strike Betty repeatedly. The prosecution counters by asking about crime scene details that Candy cannot sufficiently explain, and suggests that Candy is a good liar who tricked family and friends. Don has character witnesses testify that Betty was difficult. Ultimately, Candy is found not guilty by the jury. Eight days later, the Montgomerys leave to start a new life in Georgia, with Candy dropping by the Gores' house on the way to say goodbye to Allan.

== Reception ==
On Rotten Tomatoes, Love & Death holds an approval rating of 62% based on 50 critic reviews, with an average rating of 6.5/10. The website's critics consensus reads, "A terrific Elizabeth Olsen gives Love & Death some life, but this rote retelling of a grisly murder does little to distinguish itself from other true crime tales." Metacritic assigned the series a weighted average score of 62 out of 100, based on 18 critics, indicating "generally favorable reviews".

Variety said that Love & Death is "well-made" but unoriginal, drawing comparisons to Hulu's 2022 series Candy, giving the true crime boom as the reason the two "converge on a tragedy more than four decades old", but crediting how the show "turn[s] real people into exaggerated, if empathetically rendered, versions of themselves".

== Awards and nominations ==
Accolades
Year	Award	Category	Nominee(s)	Result	Ref.
2023	British Academy Television Awards	Best International Programme	Love & Death	Nominated	
2023	Critics' Choice Television Awards	Best Limited Series	Love & Death	Nominated	
2023	Critics' Choice Television Awards	Best Supporting Actor in a Limited Series or TV Movie	Jesse Plemons	Nominated	
2023	Golden Globe Awards	Best Actress – Limited Series or Television Film	Elizabeth Olsen	Nominated	
2023	Primetime Emmy Awards	Outstanding Supporting Actor in a Limited or Anthology Series or Movie	Jesse Plemons	Nominated	

== See also ==
- Candy (2022), another television miniseries based on the same case
