= The Librarianist =

2023 novel by Patrick deWitt

- First edition cover (US)
- Author: Patrick deWitt
- Language: English
- Publisher: House of Anansi Press (Canada); Ecco Press (US)
- Publication date: July 4, 2023
- Media type: Print, e-book, audiobook
- Pages: 352 pages
- ISBN: 978-1-4870-0991-5 (Canada); 978-0-06-308512-1 (US)

The Librarianist is a 2023 novel by Canadian-born author Patrick deWitt. It was published on July 4, 2023, by House of Anansi Press and Ecco Press. It follows a retired librarian named Bob Comet and is billed as a "wide-ranging and ambitious document of the introvert's condition."

== Reception ==
Kirkus Reviews, in a starred review, deemed it "a quietly effective and moving character study."

Sam Sacks of The Wall Street Journal called it "Mr. deWitt's smoothest book by far, one more prone than usual to clichés [...] but also more warmhearted. It shares the attributes of its hero: likable, unshowy, somewhat dull but reliably soothing."

It was the winner of the 2024 Stephen Leacock Memorial Medal for Humour.
