= Elizabeth Olsen =

American actress (born 1989)

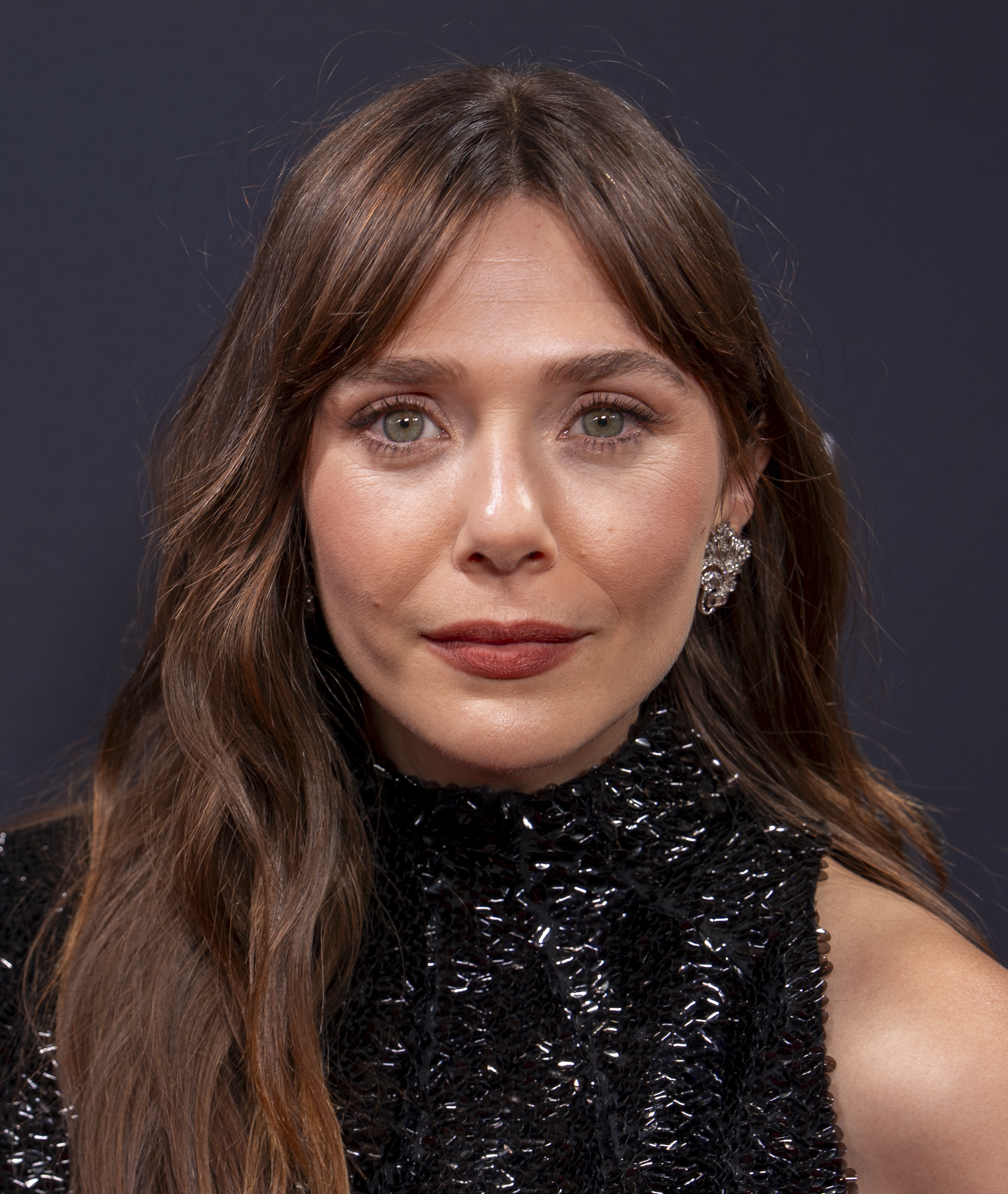
- Olsen in 2025
- Born: Elizabeth Chase Olsen; February 16, 1989 (age 37); Los Angeles, California, U.S.
- Education: New York University (BFA)
- Occupation: Actress
- Years active: 1993–present
- Spouse: Robbie Arnett (m. 2019)
- Children: 1
- Relatives: Mary-Kate Olsen (sister); Ashley Olsen (sister)

Elizabeth Chase Olsen (born February 16, 1989) is an American actress. Known for her roles in blockbusters and independent dramas, her accolades include nominations for a BAFTA Award, an Emmy Award, and two Golden Globe Awards.

Born in Los Angeles, Olsen began acting at age four alongside her two eldest twin sisters Mary-Kate and Ashley Olsen. She had her film debut in the thriller Martha Marcy May Marlene (2011), for which she garnered praise. She then took on roles in the horror film Silent House (2012) and the action film Godzilla (2014), received a nomination for the BAFTA Rising Star Award, and graduated from New York University. She gained worldwide recognition for portraying Wanda Maximoff / Scarlet Witch in the Marvel Cinematic Universe (MCU) since 2014, with the miniseries WandaVision (2021) earning her nominations for the Golden Globe and Primetime Emmy for Best Actress.

Outside of the MCU, Olsen's film credits include the neo-Western Wind River (2017), the black comedy Ingrid Goes West (2017), the drama His Three Daughters (2023), and the fantasy romance Eternity (2025). Her television credits include the drama series Sorry for Your Loss (2018–2019) and the miniseries Love & Death (2023) as Candy Montgomery, with the latter earning her a second Golden Globe nomination.

== Early life and education ==
Elizabeth Chase Olsen was born on February 16, 1989, in Sherman Oaks, Los Angeles, California. Her mother, Jarnie, is a former dancer and personal manager, while her father, Dave, is a real estate agent. Her father has Norwegian ancestry while her mother is of French, German and Italian ancestry. She is the younger sister of twin fashion designers Mary-Kate and Ashley Olsen, who became successful television and film actresses as children. Olsen also has an older brother. Her parents divorced in 1996, and their father remarried that same year. Through him and his second wife, McKenzie, the four siblings have two half-siblings.

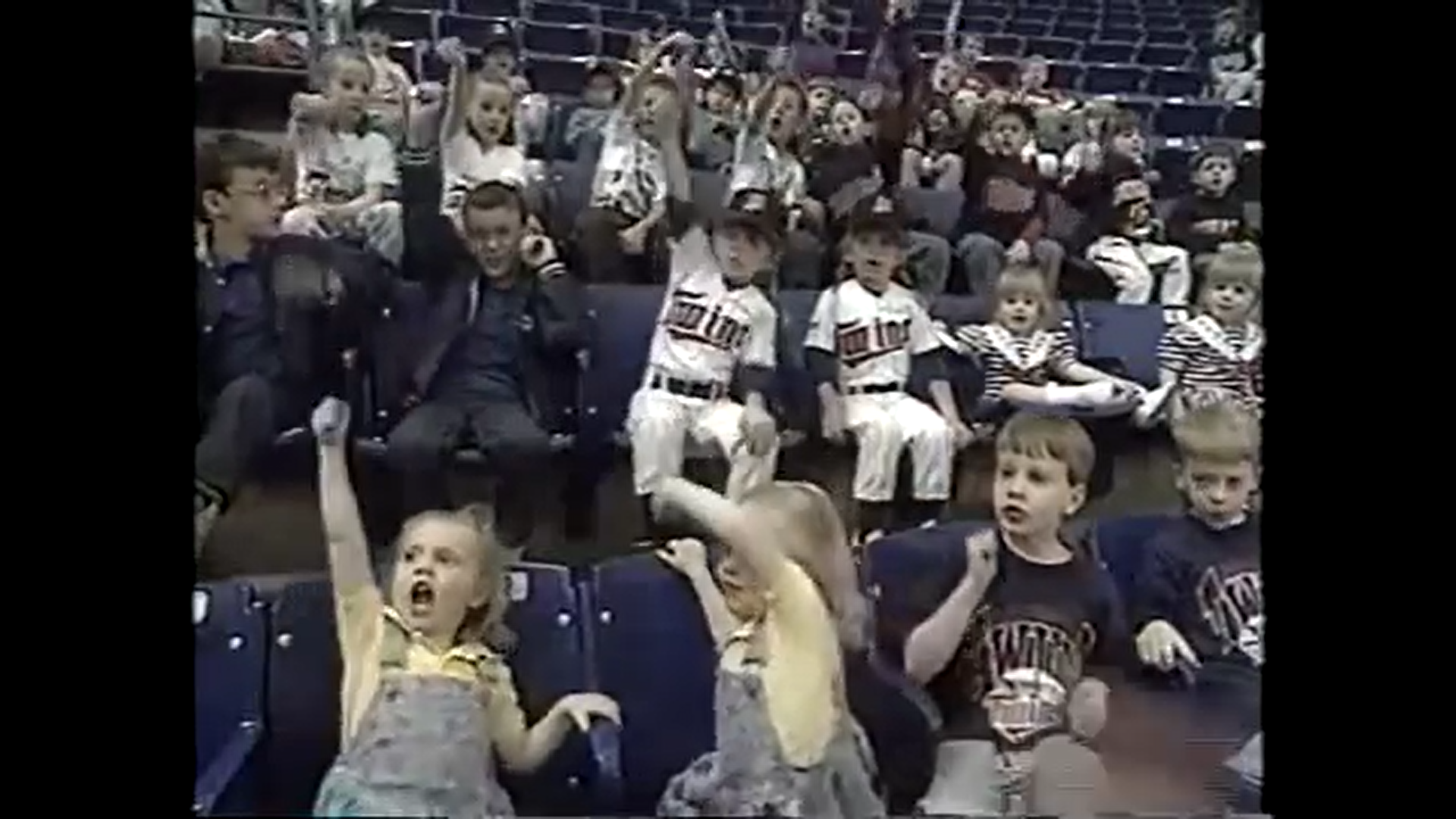
Olsen (center, second from right) next to her sisters, Mary-Kate and Ashley Olsen (in matching white) in 1993

Olsen began acting when she was four years old, appearing in Mary-Kate and Ashley's projects, including the 1994 television film How the West Was Fun and the straight-to-video series The Adventures of Mary-Kate & Ashley. After her sisters' music success with their sophomore album I Am The Cute One, Olsen was signed by their label BMG Kidz in August 1994. Despite being signed to the children's music label, Olsen never recorded any music. As a child, she took ballet lessons and acting classes and spent time at musical theatre camp. For a time, she chose ballet over acting and at one point wanted to work as an accountant at Wall Street.

Olsen got back into acting while in high school, but nearly quit pursuing acting in 2004 due to the media attention toward Mary-Kate's eating disorder. She went to Campbell Hall School in Studio City, Los Angeles. Olsen matriculated to New York University (NYU)'s Tisch School of the Arts, where she majored in drama. During college, she took classes at Atlantic Theater Company. She also spent a semester at the Moscow Art Theatre School in Russia, where she began to take acting more seriously than she had before. She attained understudy roles in the 2008 off-Broadway production of the play Dust and the 2009 Broadway production of the play Impressionism, which led to her securing an agent. Olsen graduated from NYU in January 2013.

== Career ==
=== Early roles (2011–2014) ===
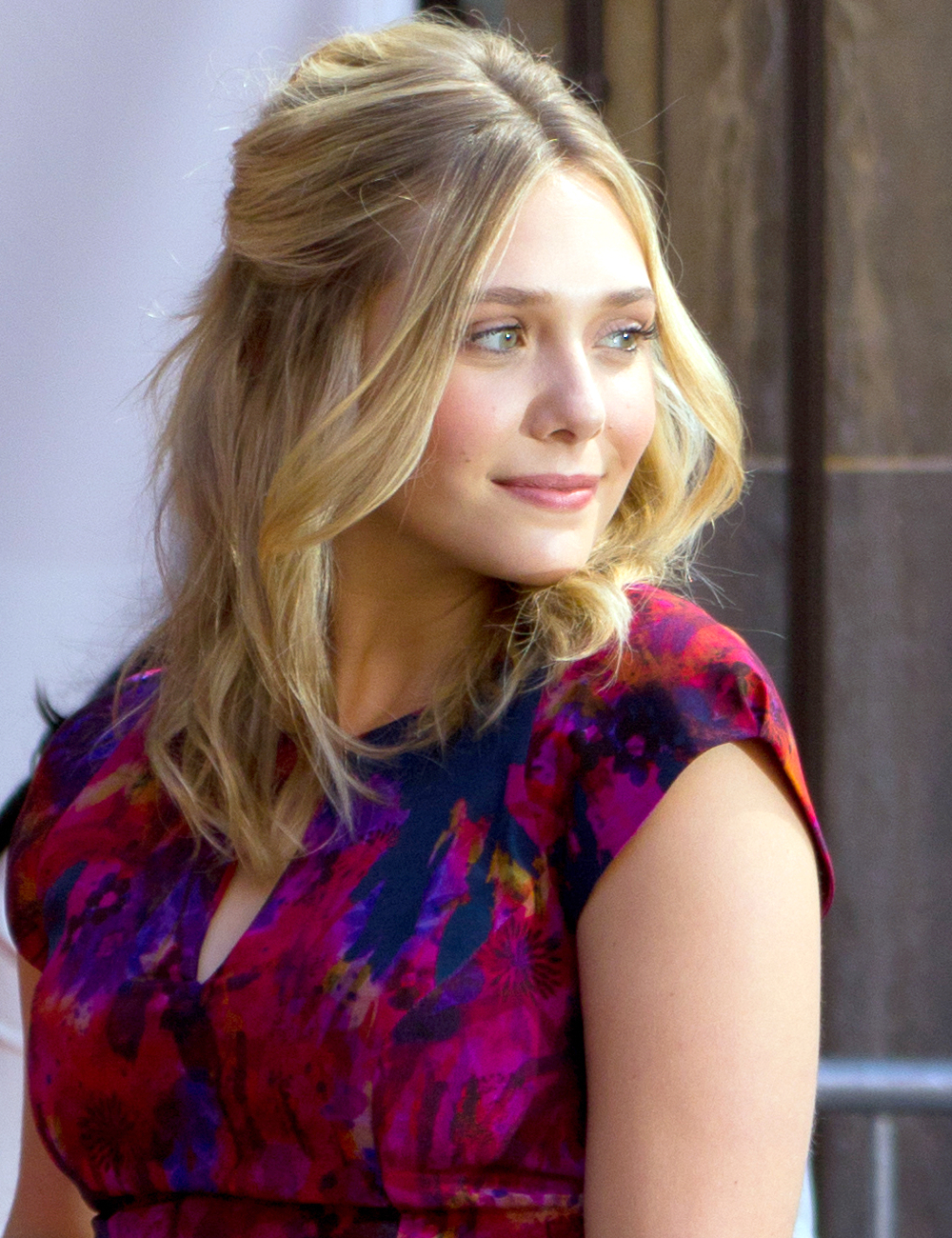
Olsen at the 2011 Toronto International Film Festival premiere of Martha Marcy May Marlene, her first role to gain critical attention

Olsen made her film debut in the 2011 thriller film Martha Marcy May Marlene. The film, along with her performance, received critical acclaim following its premiere at the Sundance Film Festival. Olsen earned several award nominations for her portrayal of the titular Martha, a young woman suffering from delusions after fleeing her life in a cult and returning to her family, including those for the Critics' Choice Movie Award for Best Actress and the Independent Spirit Award for Best Female Lead. She attributed her interest in the character to her own fascination with mental illnesses. Olsen next appeared in the horror film Silent House, which garnered her "rave reviews". Despite premiering at the Sundance Film Festival alongside Martha Marcy May Marlene, it was released in 2012, during which she also starred in the thriller Red Lights and the comedy Liberal Arts.

In January 2013, Olsen garnered a nomination for the BAFTA Rising Star Award at the 66th British Academy Film Awards. Later that year, she played Edie Parker, novelist Jack Kerouac's first wife and the author of the Beat Generation memoir You'll Be Okay, in the biographical drama Kill Your Darlings. She also appeared in the American remake of the 2003 South Korean film Oldboy, playing Marie Sebastian, a nurse who helps the protagonist, played by Josh Brolin, find his daughter. That same year, she starred as the titular Juliet in an off-Broadway production of the play Romeo and Juliet by William Shakespeare. The New York Times critic Ben Brantley described her portrayal as "alternating between saucy petulance and hysteria".

She played the leading role in In Secret, a film adaptation of Émile Zola's 1867 novel Thérèse Raquin. The film was released in February 2014. Later that year, Olsen starred in the monster film Godzilla, opposite Bryan Cranston and Aaron Taylor-Johnson, which received positive reviews and grossed $529 million against a $160 million production budget. She and Dakota Fanning co-starred as teenage girls in Brooklyn in the film Very Good Girls, released that same year, which Josh Duboff of Vanity Fair characterized as unfavorably reviewed.

=== Introduction into the Marvel Cinematic Universe (2015–2019) ===
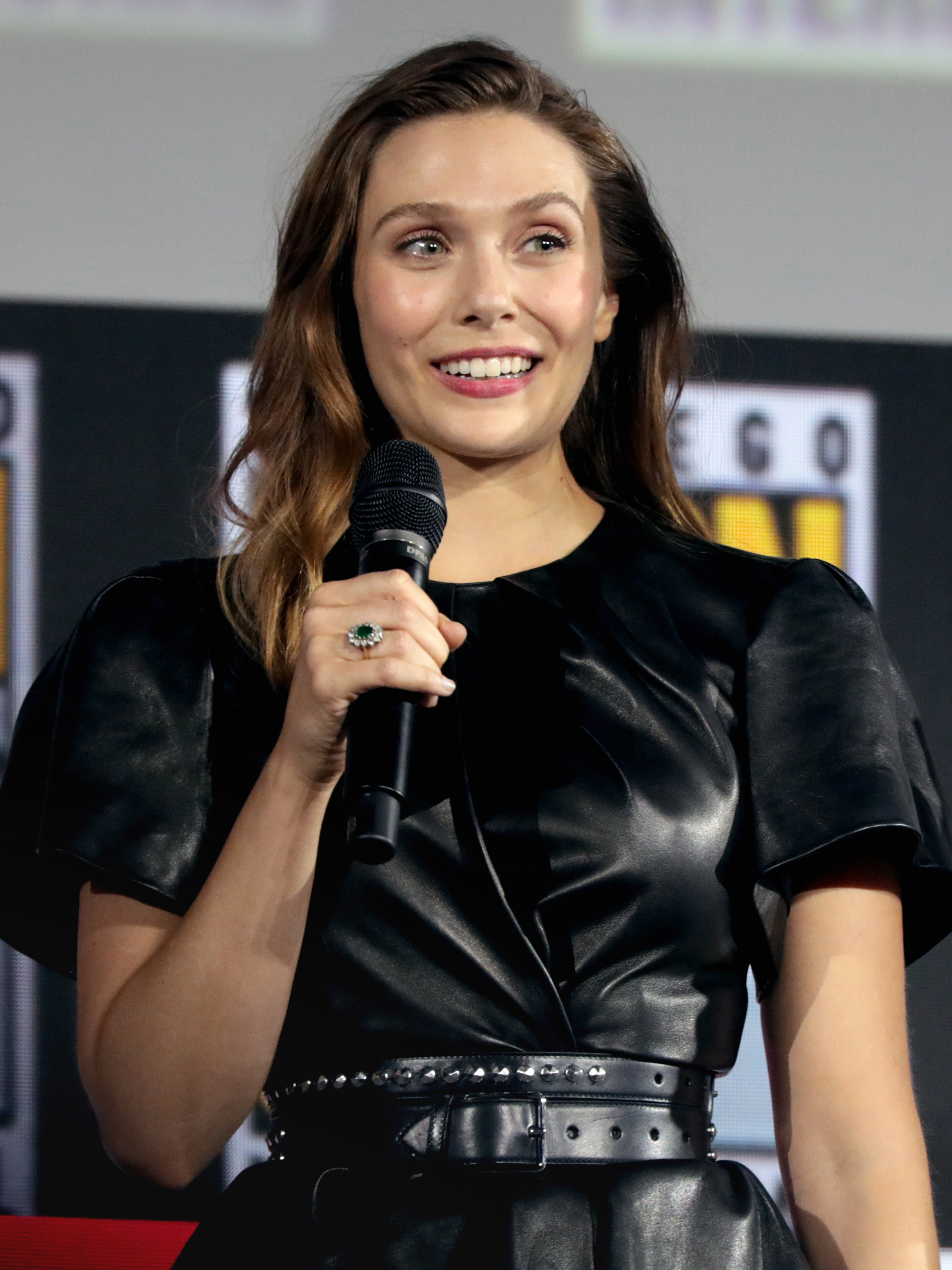
Olsen at the 2019 San Diego Comic-Con

Olsen starred in the 2015 superhero film Avengers: Age of Ultron, a sequel to The Avengers, joining the Marvel Cinematic Universe media franchise. In the film, she portrayed Wanda Maximoff / Scarlet Witch, which marked the comic book character's film debut. She first appeared as the character in a post-credits scene of the 2014 film Captain America: The Winter Soldier, alongside Aaron Taylor-Johnson, who portrayed Maximoff's brother, Pietro. Olsen played the part with an accent originating from a fictional country called Sokovia, which she described as similar to Slovak. She reprised the role in Captain America: Civil War (2016), Avengers: Infinity War (2018), and Avengers: Endgame (2019), the last of which became the highest-grossing film of all time. With the role, Olsen rose to fame.

Olsen portrayed Audrey Williams, the wife, manager, and duet partner of singer Hank Williams, portrayed by Tom Hiddleston, in the 2015 biographical film I Saw the Light, directed by Marc Abraham. In 2017, she starred as a novice FBI agent in the mystery film Wind River and a social media influencer in the comedy-drama film Ingrid Goes West, both of which were released in August to critical praise. Vulture's David Edelstein found Olsen's "incongruously high-schoolish demeanor" in Wind River problematic, while Peter Travers of Rolling Stone wrote that she gave a "major eye-opener of a performance" in Ingrid Goes West, deeming it "toxic perfection".

The following year, she appeared in the Netflix film Kodachrome, playing a caregiver to a photographer, played by Ed Harris. Olsen executive produced and starred as a young widow named Leigh Shaw in the Facebook Watch web television series Sorry for Your Loss, which premiered in September 2018. She said the three years it took to develop the series enabled her to immerse herself in Shaw's impulses. Critics reviewed the series positively, and Olsen's performance, which earned her a nomination for the Critics' Choice Television Award for Best Actress in a Drama Series, was noted as "stunning", "disciplined and sharp", as well as "slyly sympathetic". The show was canceled in January 2020 after two seasons.

=== Streaming projects and acclaim (2020–present) ===
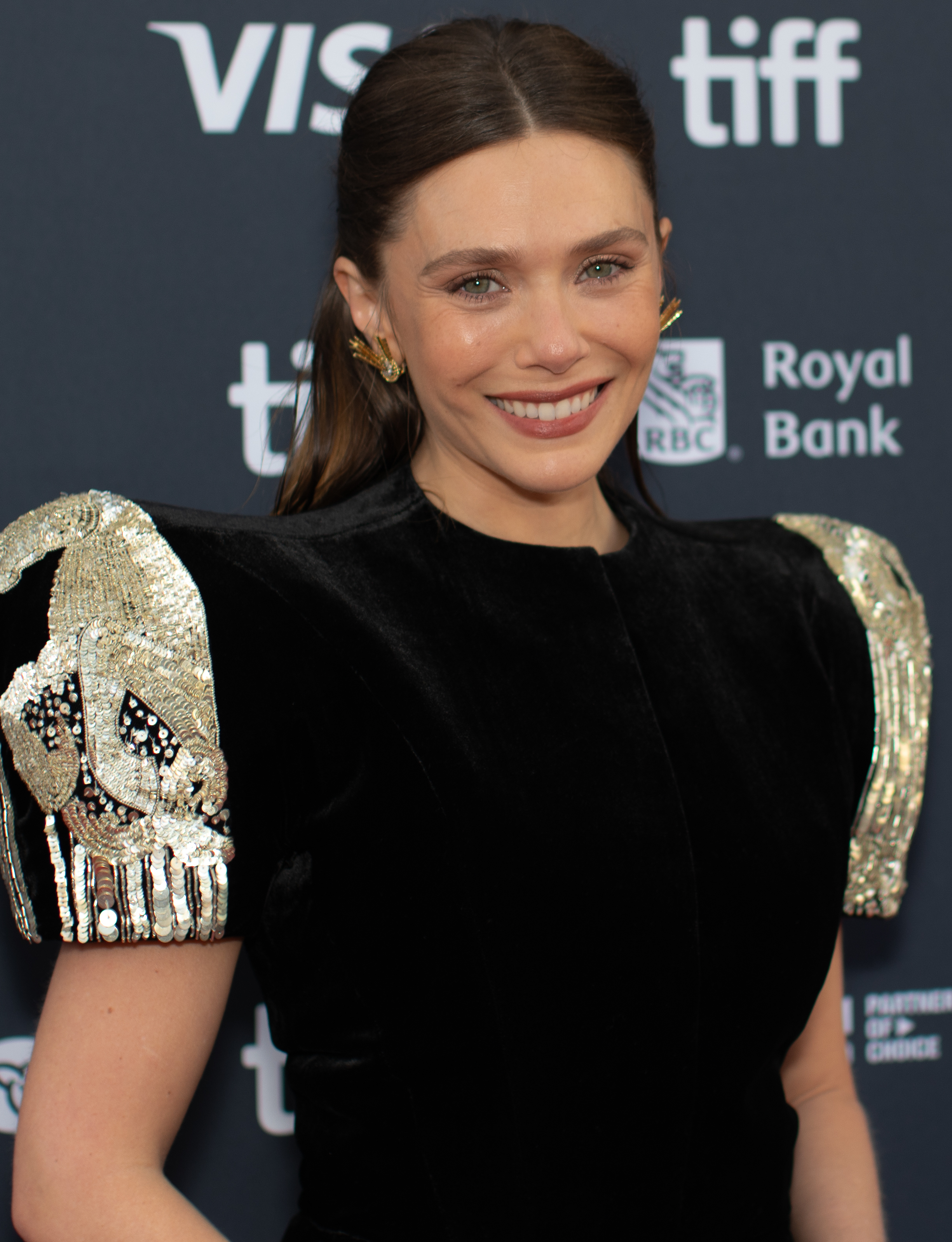
Olsen at the 2024 Toronto International Film Festival in support of The Assessment

Alongside Paul Bettany as Vision, Olsen played Maximoff again in the superhero miniseries WandaVision, which premiered on Disney+ in January 2021. In addition to complimenting Olsen and Bettany's chemistry, critics praised the cast, with Vox's Alex Abad-Santos writing Olsen was brilliant in her portrayal and Linda Holmes of NPR highlighting her "indelible central performance" in their respective reviews. Olsen earned a Primetime Emmy Award nomination for Outstanding Lead Actress in a Limited or Anthology Series or Movie and Golden Globe Award nomination for Best Actress – Miniseries or Television Film for her performance. She reprised the role in the film Doctor Strange in the Multiverse of Madness, which was released in May 2022 to mixed reviews. Olsen's performance received praise, with Owen Gleiberman of Variety writing that it "generates an operatic fire". She again returned to the role in the finale of the miniseries VisionQuest (2026).

Olsen starred as housewife Candy Montgomery in Love and Death (2023), an HBO Max limited series about a 1980 killing in Texas. Her performance earned her a nomination for the Golden Globe Award for Best Actress – Miniseries or Television Film. Following the series, Olsen then starred in Azazel Jacobs' drama film His Three Daughters and the science fiction thriller The Assessment. She voiced a variant of Wanda Maximoff in Marvel's animated series Marvel Zombies, which released on September 24, 2025. She then starred as Joan in David Freyne's romantic comedy Eternity alongside Miles Teller and Callum Turner, which released on November 26, 2025.

==== Upcoming projects ====
Olsen will next appear in Sam Esmail's thriller Panic Carefully, which is set for release on February 26, 2027. She is also attached to star in the upcoming drama series Seven Sisters, Todd Solondz's dark comedy Love Child, and the Apple TV+ limited series Once There Were Wolves, adapted from Charlotte McConaghy's novel.

== Personal life ==
She once held a real estate license in New York, which she obtained after first moving there. Olsen is an ambassador for the company Bobbi Brown Cosmetics. She described herself as an atheist.

Olsen has credited Diane Keaton as a primary influence, both in her acting and personal life. Keaton helped Olsen learn to be "the kind of woman I wanted to be, because I hadn't seen the woman I felt connected to in films. I was like, I'm not the sexy one, I'm not the nerd, I don't know where I fit."

Her older sisters, Mary-Kate and Ashley, have also influenced her and given her career advice, though at one point Olsen considered changing her name to her middle name, Chase, to distance herself from her sisters, as she wanted to be noticed for her talent and not solely for being their sister.

She and actor Boyd Holbrook were in a relationship from 2012 to 2014 and were briefly engaged.

In July 2019, Olsen became engaged to musician Robbie Arnett of the American band Milo Greene, after three years of dating. The two secretly eloped that same year. She and Arnett live in Los Angeles. Together, they co-wrote the children's books Hattie Harmony: Worry Detective, released in June 2022, and Hattie Harmony: Opening Night, released in June 2023. Olsen and Arnett's experiences with anxiety inspired the books. Olsen gave birth to their first child in 2026.

== Acting credits ==
Key
†	Denotes films that have not yet been released

=== Film ===
Year	Title	Role	Notes	Ref.
1994	How the West Was Fun	Girl in Car	Television film	
2011	Martha Marcy May Marlene	Martha / Marcy May / Marlene Lewis		
2012	Red Lights	Sally Owen		
2012	Silent House	Sarah		
2012	Peace, Love & Misunderstanding	Zoe		
2012	Liberal Arts	Zibby		
2013	Kill Your Darlings	Edie Parker		
2013	Oldboy	Marie Sebastian / Mia Doucett		
2014	In Secret	Thérèse Raquin		
2014	Captain America: The Winter Soldier	Wanda Maximoff	Uncredited cameo; mid-credits scene	
2014	Very Good Girls	Gerry Fields		
2014	Godzilla	Elle Brody		
2015	Avengers: Age of Ultron	Wanda Maximoff		
2015	I Saw the Light	Audrey Williams		
2016	Captain America: Civil War	Wanda Maximoff		
2017	Ingrid Goes West	Taylor Sloane		
2017	Wind River	Jane Banner		
2017	Kodachrome	Zooey Kern		
2018	Avengers: Infinity War	Wanda Maximoff		
2019	Avengers: Endgame	Wanda Maximoff		
2022	Doctor Strange in the Multiverse of Madness	Wanda Maximoff / Scarlet Witch		
2023	His Three Daughters	Christina	Also executive producer	
2024	The Assessment	Mia		
2025	Eternity	Joan Cutler	Also executive producer	
2026	Avengers: Doomsday †	Wanda Maximoff / Scarlet Witch	Post-production	
2027	Panic Carefully †	TBA	Post-production	

=== Television ===
Key
†	Denotes television productions that have not yet been released

Year	Title	Role	Notes	Ref.
2016	Drunk History	Norma Kopp	Episode: "Siblings"	
2017	HarmonQuest	Stirrip	Episode: "The Keystone Obelisk"	
2018–2019	Sorry for Your Loss	Leigh Shaw	Main role; also executive producer	
2021	WandaVision	Wanda Maximoff / Scarlet Witch	Main role; 9 episodes	
2021–2022	Marvel Studios: Assembled	Herself	2 episodes	
2022	Saturday Night Live	Herself	Episode: "Benedict Cumberbatch/Arcade Fire"	
2023	Love & Death	Candy Montgomery	Main role; 7 episodes	
2023	What If...?	Wanda Maximoff / Scarlet Witch	Voice; 2 episodes	
2025	Marvel Zombies	Wanda Maximoff / Scarlet Witch	Voice; 3 episodes	
2026	VisionQuest	Wanda Maximoff / Scarlet Witch	Mid-credits cameo; episode: "Forever" (uncredited)	
TBA	Seven Sisters †	Adrienne	Main role	

=== Theater ===
Year	Title	Role	Venue	Ref.
2013	Romeo and Juliet	Juliet	Classic Stage Company	

== Awards and nominations ==
Accolades received by Elizabeth Olsen
Year	Association	Category	Nominated work	Result	Ref.
2011	Chicago Film Critics Association	Most Promising Performer	Martha Marcy May Marlene	Won	
2011	Chicago Film Critics Association	Best Actress	Martha Marcy May Marlene	Nominated	
2011	Detroit Film Critics Society	Best Breakthrough Performance	Martha Marcy May Marlene	Nominated	
2011	Elle Women in Hollywood	Woman of the Year	—N/a	Won	
2011	Florida Film Critics Circle	Pauline Kael Breakout Award	Martha Marcy May Marlene	Won	
2011	Ghent International Film Festival	Special Mention	Martha Marcy May Marlene	Won	
2011	Gotham Independent Film Awards	Best Breakthrough Actress	Martha Marcy May Marlene	Nominated	
2011	Gotham Independent Film Awards	Best Ensemble Performance (Note: Shared with Christopher Abbott, Brady Corbet, Hugh Dancy, Maria Dizzia, Julia Garner, John Hawkes, Louisa Krause, and Sarah Paulson.)	Martha Marcy May Marlene	Nominated	
2011	Indiana Film Journalists Association	Best Actress	Martha Marcy May Marlene	Won	
2011	Los Angeles Film Critics Association	New Generation Award (Note: Shared with Antonio Campos, Sean Durkin, and Josh Mond.)	Martha Marcy May Marlene	Won	
2011	Phoenix Film Critics Society Awards	Best Actress in a Leading Role	Martha Marcy May Marlene	Won	
2011	San Diego Film Critics	Best Actress	Martha Marcy May Marlene	Nominated	
2011	Satellite Awards	Best Actress – Motion Picture	Martha Marcy May Marlene	Nominated	
2011	St. Louis Film Critics Association	Best Actress	Martha Marcy May Marlene	Nominated	
2011	Toronto Film Critics Association	Best Actress	Martha Marcy May Marlene	Runner-up	
2011	Village Voice Film Poll	Best Actress	Martha Marcy May Marlene	5th place	
2011	Washington D.C. Area Film Critics Association	Best Actress	Martha Marcy May Marlene	Nominated	
2012	Alliance of Women Film Journalists	Best Breakthrough Performance	Martha Marcy May Marlene	Won	
2012	Critics' Choice Movie Awards	Best Actress	Martha Marcy May Marlene	Nominated	
2012	Dublin Film Critics' Circle Awards	Best Actress	Martha Marcy May Marlene	5th place	
2012	Dublin Film Critics' Circle Awards	Breakthrough Artist	Martha Marcy May Marlene	3rd place	
2012	Dorian Awards	We're Wilde About You / Rising Star Award	—N/a	Nominated	
2012	Independent Spirit Awards	Best Female Lead	Martha Marcy May Marlene	Nominated	
2012	International Cinephile Society Awards	Best Actress	Martha Marcy May Marlene	Nominated	
2012	NewNowNext Awards	Next Mega Star	Silent House	Nominated	
2012	Online Film Critics Society	Best Actress	Martha Marcy May Marlene	Nominated	
2012	Saturn Awards	Best Actress	Martha Marcy May Marlene	Nominated	
2012	Vancouver Film Critics Circle	Best Actress	Martha Marcy May Marlene	Won	
2013	British Academy Film Awards	BAFTA Rising Star Award	—N/a	Nominated	
2013	Fangoria Chainsaw Awards	Best Leading Actress	Silent House	Won	
2014	Teen Choice Awards	Choice Movie: Breakout Star	Godzilla	Nominated	
2015	Deauville American Film Festival	Hollywood Rising Star Award	—N/a	Won	
2015	Teen Choice Awards	Choice Movie: Breakout Star	Avengers: Age of Ultron	Nominated	
2016	Teen Choice Awards	Choice Movie: Chemistry (Note: Shared with Chris Evans, Sebastian Stan, Anthony Mackie, and Jeremy Renner.)	Captain America: Civil War	Nominated	
2018	MTV Movie & TV Awards	Best Fight (Note: Shared with Danai Gurira, Scarlett Johansson, and Carrie Coon.)	Avengers: Infinity War	Nominated	
2018	Teen Choice Awards	Choice Action Movie Actress	Avengers: Infinity War	Nominated	
2019	Critics' Choice Television Awards	Best Actress in a Drama Series	Sorry for Your Loss	Nominated	
2021	MTV Movie & TV Awards	Best Performance in a Show	WandaVision	Won	
2021	MTV Movie & TV Awards	Best Fight (Note: Shared with Kathryn Hahn.)	WandaVision	Won	
2021	Hollywood Critics Association Awards	Best Actress in a Limited Series, Anthology Series, or Television Movie	WandaVision	Nominated	
2021	Dorian Awards	Best TV Performance	WandaVision	Nominated	
2021	Primetime Emmy Awards	Outstanding Lead Actress in a Limited or Anthology Series or Movie	WandaVision	Nominated	
2021	TCA Awards	Individual Achievement in Drama	WandaVision	Nominated	
2021	People's Choice Awards	Female TV Star of 2021	WandaVision	Nominated	
2022	Critics' Choice Television Awards	Best Actress in a Movie/Miniseries	WandaVision	Nominated	
2022	Critics' Choice Super Awards	Best Actress in a Superhero Series	WandaVision	Won	
2022	Golden Globe Awards	Best Actress – Miniseries or Television Film	WandaVision	Nominated	
2022	Kids' Choice Awards	Favorite Female TV Star (Family)	WandaVision	Nominated	
2022	Saturn Awards	Best Actress in a Streaming Television Series	WandaVision	Nominated	
2022	People's Choice Awards	Female Movie Star of 2022	Doctor Strange in the Multiverse of Madness	Won	
2022	People's Choice Awards	Action Movie Star of 2022	Doctor Strange in the Multiverse of Madness	Won	
2023	Kids' Choice Awards	Favorite Movie Actress	Doctor Strange in the Multiverse of Madness	Nominated	
2023	Critics' Choice Super Awards	Best Actress in a Superhero Movie	Doctor Strange in the Multiverse of Madness	Nominated	
2023	Critics' Choice Super Awards	Best Villain in a Movie	Doctor Strange in the Multiverse of Madness	Nominated	
2023	MTV Movie & TV Awards	Best Villain	Doctor Strange in the Multiverse of Madness	Won	
2023	Awards Daily Cooler Awards	Outstanding Lead Actress in a Limited/Anthology Series	Love & Death	Nominated	
2023	Gold Derby Awards	Limited Movie/Actress	Love & Death	Nominated	
2023	Online Film & Television Awards	Best Actress in a Motion Picture, Limited or Anthology Series	Love & Death	Nominated	
2024	Golden Globe Awards	Best Actress – Miniseries or Television Film	Love & Death	Nominated	
2024	Independent Spirit Awards	Robert Altman Award (Note: Shared with the cast and crew.)	His Three Daughters	Won	

== See also ==
- List of atheists in film, radio, television and theater
