= Candy (miniseries) =

2022 American biographical crime drama television miniseries

- Promotional poster
- Genre: Biographical; Crime drama
- Created by: Nick Antosca; Robin Veith
- Starring: Jessica Biel; Melanie Lynskey; Pablo Schreiber; Timothy Simons; Raúl Esparza
- Composer: Ariel Marx
- Country of origin: United States
- Original language: English
- No. of episodes: 5

Production
- Executive producers: Robin Veith; Nick Antosca; Alex Hedlund; Jessica Biel; Michelle Purple; Michael Uppendahl
- Producer: Mitch Engel
- Cinematography: Simon Dennis
- Editors: Tom Wilson; Ryan Jones
- Running time: 46–55 minutes
- Production companies: Iron Ocean; Eat the Cat; Boss Clown Productions; 20th Television; Universal Content Productions

Original release
- Network: Hulu
- Release: May 9 – May 13, 2022

Candy (released internationally as Candy: A Death in Texas) is an American biographical crime drama television miniseries created by Nick Antosca and Robin Veith. The series stars Jessica Biel as the real-life Candy Montgomery, who was accused of the axe murder of her neighbor, Betty Gore (played by Melanie Lynskey) in 1980, in Texas. It premiered on May 9, 2022, on Hulu, with a new episode for five nights until May 13. The miniseries received generally positive reviews from critics. It was nominated for Outstanding Main Title Design at the 74th Primetime Creative Arts Emmy Awards.

== Premise ==
In Wylie, Texas, 1980s suburban housewife Candy Montgomery is accused of murdering her neighbour Betty Gore, after having an affair with Gore's husband Allan.

== Cast ==
=== Main ===
- Jessica Biel as Candy Montgomery
- Melanie Lynskey as Betty Gore
- Pablo Schreiber as Allan Gore
- Timothy Simons as Pat Montgomery
- Raúl Esparza as Don Crowder
- Antonella Rose as Christina Gore

=== Recurring ===
- Jessie Mueller as Sherry Cleckler
- Adam Bartley as Richard
- Justin Timberlake as Deputy Steve Deffibaugh
- Jason Ritter as Deputy Denny Reese

== Episodes ==
No.	Title	Directed by	Written by	Original release date
1	"Friday the 13th"	Michael Uppendahl	Story by : Nick Antosca & Robin Veith; Teleplay by : Robin Veith	May 9, 2022
2	"Happy Wife, Happy Life"	Jennifer Getzinger	David Matthews	May 10, 2022
3	"Overkill"	Ben Semanoff	Brett Johnson	May 11, 2022
4	"Cover Girl"	Tara Nicole Weyr	Elise Brown	May 12, 2022
5	"The Fight"	Michael Uppendahl	Brett Johnson & David Matthews and Robin Veith	May 13, 2022

== Production ==
=== Development ===
In July 2020, it was announced UCP was developing a series revolving around Candy Montgomery, with Robin Veith writing the pilot for the series, and Nick Antosca set to executive produce under his Eat the Cat banner, with no network attached. In December 2020, it was announced Hulu had landed the series. In October 2021, it was announced Elisabeth Moss, who was originally set to star as Candy, had to drop out due to scheduling conflicts and would be replaced by Jessica Biel.

=== Filming ===
Principal photography for Candy began in December 2021, continuing through February 2022, with filming taking place in Austell, Georgia.

== Release ==
The trailer for Candy was released on March 17, 2022. Candy premiered on Hulu in the United States on May 9, 2022, with new episodes released nightly over five consecutive days, concluding on May 13. Disney also announced that Candy would be available on its Disney+ Hotstar service in India starting July 15. Internationally, Candy was released on Disney+ as a Star Original. In Latin America, Candy premiered on July 27, 2022, on Star+. The series is also known as Candy: A Death In Texas instead of Candy in some international markets.

== Reception ==
=== Viewership ===
Whip Media, which tracks viewership data for the more than 21 million worldwide users of its TV Time app, reported that Candy was the fifth most-anticipated new television series of May 2022. JustWatch, a guide to streaming content with access to data from more than 20 million users around the world, estimated that it was the most-streamed television series in the U.S. from May 9–15. The streaming aggregator Reelgood, which tracks real-time data from 5 million U.S. users for original and acquired content across SVOD and AVOD services, reported that Candy was the eighth most-streamed series during the week of May 14. The show rose to third place in the following week, ending May 21.

Nielsen Media Research, which records streaming viewership on U.S. television screens, estimated that Candy was watched for 557 million minutes from May 9–15. The first episode, released on Monday, May 9, was the most viewed, with 42 million minutes watched. Subsequent episodes each recorded approximately 25 million minutes. Nielsen also reported that 36% of the audience was between the ages of 35 and 49, and 73% of viewers were female. In the following week, from May 16–22, Candy recorded 359 million minutes of viewing time, ranking as the eighth most-streamed original series.

=== Critical response ===
On review aggregator website Rotten Tomatoes, the limited series holds a 72% approval rating based on 47 critic reviews, with an average rating of 6.4/10. The website's critics consensus reads: "Candy's sour aftertaste is counterbalanced by uniformly terrific performances, but it only takes a couple licks before this true crime drama loses its flavor." On Metacritic, the series has a score of 61 out of 100, based on 19 critics, indicating "generally favorable reviews".

Josh Bell of Comic Book Resources remarked that the series effectively captures a late 1970s aesthetic through its décor and costumes. Bell commended the miniseries for its portrayal of the main characters' struggles through its dark tone and praised Biel's performance as Candy Montgomery, as well as the work of the supporting cast. Brian Lowry of CNN found that Candy surpasses many true crime dramas in effectiveness, highlighting the convincing and well-rendered performances of Biel and Lynskey. Lowry also praised the miniseries for incorporating solid additional scripted elements, distinguishing it from other contemporary series in the same genre.

Joel Keller of Decider praised the cast's performances, particularly those of Biel and Lynskey, and found the decision to begin the miniseries with Betty Gore's death intriguing. Keller appreciated how the series later delves into the events leading up to her death through a reconstruction of the characters' interactions. Matt Fowler of IGN rated the miniseries seven out of ten, commending the cast's performances and praising the show for maintaining a sense of tension without revealing too much information in its early episodes.

Maggie Boccella of Collider awarded the miniseries a C+ rating, describing it as a satisfactory true crime drama. While Boccella praised the actors' performances, they criticized the series for its lack of character development. Lucy Mangan of The Guardian commended the interesting study of female rage and miscarriages of political, social, legal, and justice systems represented articulately in the series. According to Mangan, the film elaborates the events that often flesh out the intangible features of a story not designed for factual programming.

==== Comparisons with Love & Death ====
Following the release of Love & Death in 2023, Candy, which is also based on the same events, was likened by some critics for its similarities and differences to the former. Alexis Soloski of The New York Times said that while understanding the "why" behind the crime is important, a true-crime drama must also address the "how." They found that since both Candy and Love & Death are categorized as prestige dramas rather than pure true-crime, despite being fact-based, both series struggled with the portrayal of violence and the perspective from which it is presented. Soloski found that both shows ultimately depicted the killing in ways that aligned with Montgomery's trial testimony, creating scenes that were disturbing even to those involved in their production. Shikhar Verma of High on Films asserted that Love & Death takes a more traditional approach, offering a dramatic retelling of the events. In contrast, they stated that Candy adopts a different perspective by focusing heavily on the psychological aspects of the case. Verma praised Candy for its portrayal of the story as a character study of female rage and noted that, unlike Love & Death, Candy immediately reveals the victim's identity, which creates an air of suspense and mystery.

Steve Greene of IndieWire noted that the residual horror of Betty Gore's death is portrayed differently in each series. They found that in the second-to-last episode of Candy, Pat Montgomery is depicted as horrified by the physical demands of killing someone with an axe. Conversely, Greene observed that Love & Death presents Candy's trial with a focus on the grisly evidence considered by the defendant and the jury. While one show was described as primarily confronting the audience with sensational details, the other was praised for exploring the broader impact of those details on individuals, families, and communities. Richard Roeper of Chicago Sun-Times stated that both series effectively recreate the late 1970s/early 1980s small-town atmosphere and detail the case. However, they found Candy to be slightly superior, noting that it presents the story over five episodes, whereas Love & Death extends the narrative to seven episodes. Roeper observed that Candy's earlier release made Love & Death seem somewhat redundant and unnecessary.

=== Accolades ===
Award	Year	Category	Recipient(s)	Result	Ref.
Critics' Choice Television Awards	2023	Best Supporting Actress in a Movie/Miniseries	Melanie Lynskey	Nominated	
Hollywood Critics Association TV Awards	2022	Best Actress in a Streaming Limited or Anthology Series or Movie	Jessica Biel	Nominated	
Hollywood Critics Association TV Awards	2022	Best Supporting Actress in a Streaming Limited or Anthology Series or Movie	Melanie Lynskey	Nominated	
Primetime Creative Arts Emmy Awards	2022	Outstanding Main Title Design	Ronnie Koff, Peter Frankfurt, Lexi Gunvaldson, Rob Slychuk, Nader Husseini, and Elizabeth Steinberg	Nominated	
Satellite Awards	2023	Best Actress – Miniseries or Television Film	Jessica Biel	Nominated	
Satellite Awards	2023	Best Supporting Actress – Series, Miniseries or Television Film	Melanie Lynskey	Nominated	

== See also ==
- Love & Death (2023), another television miniseries based on the same case
