= Candy Montgomery =

American homemaker accused of murder (born 1949)

- Born: Candace Lynn Wheeler; November 15, 1949 (age 76)
- Known for: Killing of Betty Gore
- Spouse: Pat Montgomery (div. 1986)
- Children: 2
- Criminal information
- Status: Acquitted
- Criminal charges: First degree murder

Details
- Victims: Betty Gore
- Date: June 13, 1980
- Country: United States
- State: Texas
- Locations: Wylie, Texas
- Date apprehended: June 26, 1980

Candace Lynn Montgomery (née Wheeler; born November 15, 1949) is an American woman who was accused of murdering her former lover's wife, Betty Gore. The killing took place in Wylie, Texas, on June 13, 1980. During the assault, Gore was struck 41 times with a wood splitting axe. Montgomery pled not guilty to charges of murder on the basis of self-defense, alleging that Gore confronted her about the affair she had with Gore's husband and attacked her with the axe. She was acquitted.

== Background ==
Location of Wylie in Collin County, Texas

Candace, who was 30 years old at the time of the incident, was married to Pat Montgomery, an electrical engineer. The couple had two children—a daughter and son. They moved to Collin County, Texas, in 1977, where they regularly attended the Methodist Church of Lucas. Candace became close friends with Betty Gore, a middle school teacher, after meeting her at a church service. Gore lived nearby with her two children and her husband, Allan, with whom Candace engaged in an extramarital affair.

On the day of Gore's killing, Allan Gore was out of town. When he was unable to reach his wife on the telephone, he requested that their neighbors go to investigate. After forcing their way into the family residence, they discovered Gore's body. Her daughter, Bethany, who had been sleeping in her crib in another room at the time of the incident, was awake, crying and covered in her own feces as it had taken 13 hours for the body to be discovered.

The crime was investigated by Steve Deffibaugh with the Collin County Sheriff’s Department.

== Trial ==
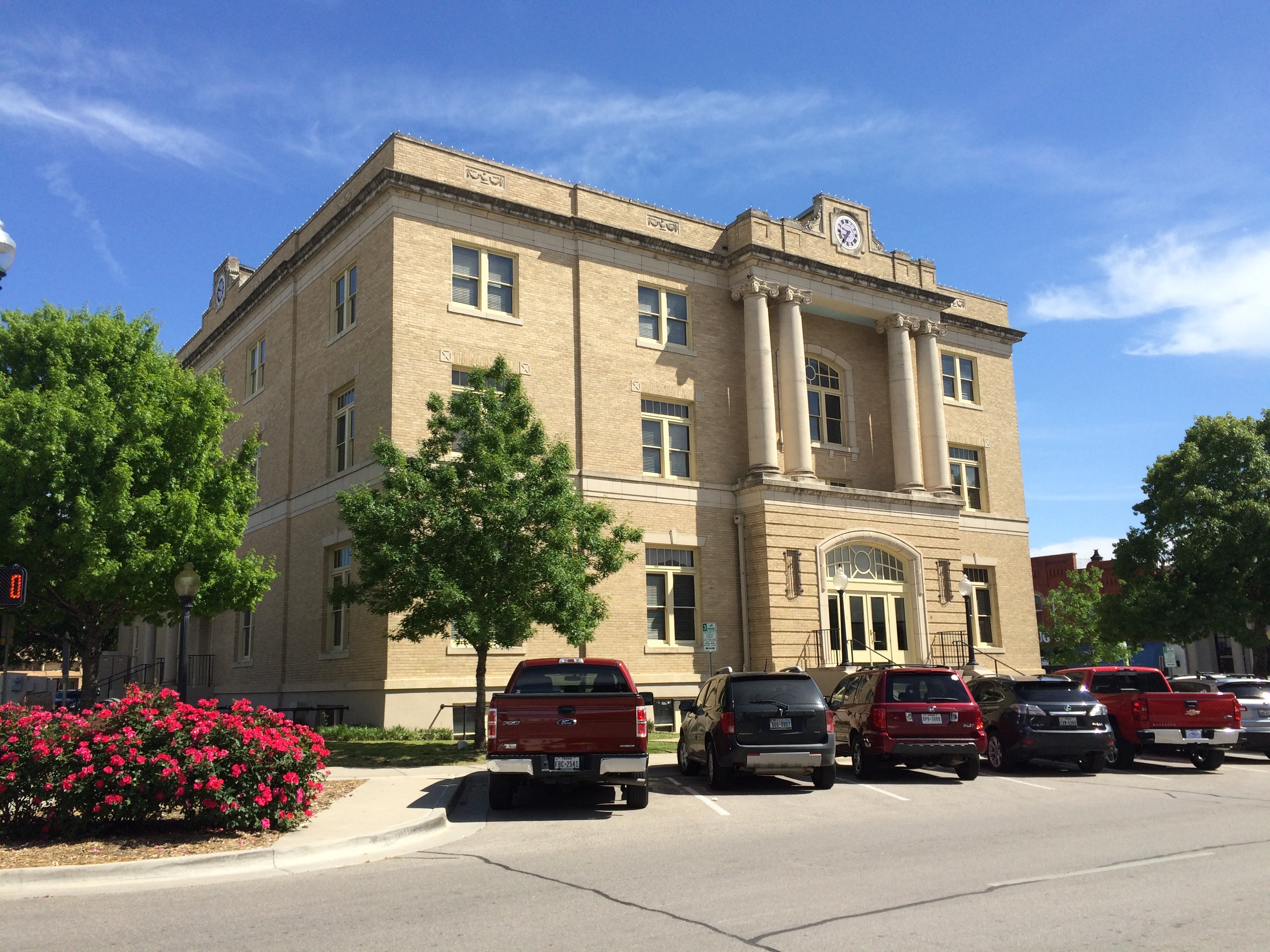
Old Collin County courthouse in McKinney, Texas, 2012

Candy Montgomery was represented by civil law attorney Don Crowder and defense attorney Robert Udashen. The trial, over which District Judge Tom Ryan was appointed to preside, was held in McKinney, Texas, and lasted eight days. Montgomery pleaded self-defense, alleging that she had defended herself after being attacked by Gore following a confrontation about Montgomery's affair with her husband, Allan. She stated that she was compelled to use an axe after Gore attempted to strike her moments before with the same weapon.

Montgomery underwent a polygraph test prior to the trial, which indicated that she was being truthful. District attorney Tom O'Connell argued that Montgomery could have fled the scene instead of attacking Gore. He also argued that attacking 41 times was disproportionate. Montgomery was subsequently found not guilty on October 30, 1980, by a jury consisting of nine women and three men, after deliberating for just over 3 hours.

== Reaction after trial ==
The verdict received a great deal of criticism from the community. Crowds chanted, "Murderer! Murderer!" as Montgomery exited the courthouse following her acquittal. The victim's father, Bob Pomeroy, said:

As far as I'm concerned, justice will be served. She has to live with it ... I wouldn't say I was happy with the verdict. We don't know what happened and we never will know what happened.

== Portrayal in media ==
A book examining the case and events following the trial, titled Evidence of Love: A True Story of Passion and Death in the Suburbs, was written by Dallas-based journalists John Bloom and Jim Atkinson. It was released in January 1984.

In the 1990 CBS TV movie A Killing in a Small Town, based on the Montgomery case but with names changed, Barbara Hershey won the Emmy award and the Golden Globe award portraying the lead character, named Cathy Morrison.

Jessica Biel portrays Montgomery in the Hulu series Candy, which debuted in May 2022.

Montgomery is portrayed by Elizabeth Olsen in the HBO Max series Love & Death, which debuted in April 2023.
