= The Sisters Brothers =

2011 novel by Patrick deWitt

- Cover image of original 2011 edition
- Author: Patrick deWitt
- Cover artist: Dan Stiles
- Language: English
- Genre: Western fiction
- Publisher: House of Anansi Press
- Publication date: 2011
- Publication place: Canada
- Media type: Print (hardcover and paperback)
- Pages: 325 (hardcover)
- ISBN: 978-0-88784-289-4 (hardcover)

The Sisters Brothers is a 2011 Western novel by Canadian-born author Patrick deWitt. The darkly comic story takes place in Oregon and California in 1851. The narrator, Eli Sisters, and his brother Charlie are assassins tasked with killing Hermann Kermit Warm, an ingenious prospector who has been accused of stealing from the Sisters' fearsome boss, the Commodore. Eli and Charlie experience a series of misadventures while tracking down Warm which resemble the narrative form of a picaresque novel, and the chapters are, according to one review, "slightly sketched-in, dangerously close to a film treatment."

The film rights for the novel were sold to actor John C. Reilly's production company and adapted into a 2018 film of the same name, with Reilly and Joaquin Phoenix playing Eli and Charlie, respectively.

== Plot summary ==
In 1851, Eli and Charlie Sisters, a pair of assassins of minor repute, are hired by a wealthy businessman known only as "the Commodore" to travel from Oregon City to California in order to murder a gold rush prospector named Hermann Kermit Warm, who is described to them as a "thief". Hard-nosed, plainspoken Charlie, more impulsive and aggressive than his younger brother Eli, has a fondness for binge drinking and appears remorseless about the crimes he commits. Eli, contemplative and often sentimental, admires and looks up to Charlie but finds himself at odds with Charlie's apparent nonchalance about the directions their lives are taking. The brothers bicker constantly about money, the job, their horses, and each other's personalities.

As they ride south, Eli and Charlie encounter many strange characters and endure a series of mishaps and adventures. Eli is first bitten by a spider and then must have a tooth removed, for which he is given morphine to numb the pain; his horse is attacked by a grizzly bear but survives despite a serious eye injury. Charlie frequently gets drunk and is too sick to ride the following morning, slowing their progress to California, which frustrates Eli. The pair hears rumors on the trail about a female bear with a uniquely red-colored pelt, for which a hefty reward has been offered by a man named Mayfield.

Entering California, the brothers unexpectedly spot the bear and Charlie kills it, and they decide to bring it to Mayfield, who runs an inn in a town named after him. After being paid, Charlie insists they stay a night in Mayfield's hotel; Eli sleeps with the hotel's bookkeeper. Waking the next morning, they discover the red bear pelt is missing and suspect Mayfield will accuse them of stealing it. The brothers sneak to the stable to retrieve their horses and flee town, but a group of surly fur trappers who work for Mayfield stop them and demand they return the cash they were paid for the pelt. Charlie and Eli simultaneously dispatch these enemies with well-placed gunshots, and Charlie feels compelled to kill an innocent stable boy to eliminate eyewitnesses. Returning to the hotel, they reach a deal with Mayfield, allowing him to leave in search of an old enemy, a man whom they both know to be dead. As per their end of the deal, the brothers keep the majority of his enormous cache of gold and hiding a large amount of it behind the hotel's stove for safekeeping while they leave to finish their business with Hermann Warm.

Eli and Charlie reach San Francisco and seek out an acquaintance named Morris, whom the Commodore had instructed to keep track of Warm until the Sisters brothers arrived. Morris has disappeared, though, and the brothers must coerce the proprietor of his hotel to hand over Morris' journal. The journal reveals that Morris was approached by Warm, who has concocted an ingenious chemical formula that causes gold to glow brilliantly, making it highly useful for indicating the location of placer deposits in riverbeds. Warm demonstrated his formula to Morris and offered him a partnership in it, and the two have since teamed up to travel to the "River of Light", where they hope to test large quantities of it. Eli and Charlie realize then that the Commodore has duped them: Warm is not a thief but had simply refused to share his formula with the Commodore. Though Charlie wants to see the job done as intended, Eli hesitates to murder an innocent man, but they eventually agree to ride out to Warm's claim and finish the job, which Eli vows will be his last for the Commodore.

When they finally track Morris and Warm to their camp along a remote river, Warm at first catches them off-guard, knowing they were sent to kill him. But the prospectors do not retaliate, and Eli and Charlie likewise earn Warm's trust by defending the camp from a gang of curious bandits. Soon, the four men decide to join forces in the prospecting operation. Warm's gold-finding formula, however, proves severely caustic, and both Morris and Warm are already suffering burns to their skin from having exposed their legs to the chemical while wading in the contaminated river. The four partners wait for nightfall to pour the formula into the river and collect as many illuminated gold fragments as possible before the glow fades away. Charlie spills some of the raw formula on his shooting hand and finds it too painful to use, but the men manage to extract a fortune in gold from the riverbed. Morris then falls into the river and Warm dives in to rescue him; both men are severely burned and die from exposure the following day. While the brothers wait for Warm to die so he can be given a proper burial, a party of Indians stumbles upon the camp and robs the men of their money and the gold they had collected. Eli realizes that no one but Warm knew how to make the formula.

The Sisters brothers slowly make their way back to Oregon City, stopping in Mayfield on the way, only to discover the entire town burned down and the gold bullion they had hidden there missing. Mayfield's whores gang up on the brothers and rob them of their little remaining money and pistols. Charlie's burned hand is eventually amputated, and Eli nurses him back to health. Profoundly distressed by the experience, Charlie's former confidence and fearlessness are now gone. Eli, too, is uncertain what to do with himself, but sets out first to break the endless cycle of killers hired by the Commodore by killing him instead. He finds the Commodore soliloquizing in a bathtub in his mansion and drowns him. Now free of their life of crime, the brothers return to their mother's house, where she welcomes them to stay.

== Background ==
The Sisters Brothers was inspired by a Time–Life book on the California Gold Rush, which deWitt found at a yard sale.

== Publication history ==
The Sisters Brothers was first published in May 2011, by Ecco Press in the United States, House of Anansi Press in Canada, and Granta Books in the United Kingdom.

== Reception ==
In the year of its release, the book was declared a winner at the 75th Governor General's Literary Awards, held by the Canada Council for the Arts, as well as the winner of the $25,000 Rogers Writers' Trust Fiction Prize awarded by the Writers' Trust of Canada. The book also won the 2012 Stephen Leacock Medal from The Stephen Leacock Memorial Medal for humour writing, and was announced as the winner of the award for Best Fiction at the Canadian Booksellers Association Libris Awards. It also won the 2012 Canadian Authors Association Award for Fiction. Additionally, it was shortlisted for the Man Booker Prize, the 2011 Scotiabank Giller Prize, and the 2012 Walter Scott Prize. The Sisters Brothers was number one on Amazon.ca's Best Books of 2011: Top 100 Editors' Picks list and, according to Amazon.ca, was the top-selling fiction book in Canada for the week ending December 11, 2011.
