= His Three Daughters =

2023 film by Azazel Jacobs

- Release poster
- Directed by: Azazel Jacobs
- Written by: Azazel Jacobs
- Produced by: Azazel Jacobs; Alex Orlovsky; Duncan Montgomery; Matt Aselton; Marc Marrie; Mal Ward; Lia Buman; Tim Headington; Jack Selby
- Starring: Carrie Coon; Natasha Lyonne; Elizabeth Olsen; Rudy Galvan; Jose Febus; Jasmine Bracey; Jay O. Sanders; Jovan Adepo
- Cinematography: Sam Levy
- Edited by: Azazel Jacobs
- Music by: Rodrigo Amarante
- Production company: High Frequency Entertainment
- Distributed by: Netflix
- Release dates: September 9, 2023 (TIFF); September 6, 2024 (United States)
- Running time: 101 minutes
- Country: United States
- Language: English

His Three Daughters is a 2023 American drama film written and directed by Azazel Jacobs. The film stars Carrie Coon, Natasha Lyonne, and Elizabeth Olsen as three estranged sisters who come back together to care for their ailing father.

It premiered at the Toronto International Film Festival on September 9, 2023, and was released in select theaters in the United States on September 6, 2024, before its streaming debut by Netflix on September 20, 2024. It received positive reviews and was named one of the Top Ten Independent Films of 2024 by the National Board of Review.

The film won the Independent Spirit Robert Altman Award, which was given to the cast and Jacobs.

== Plot ==
As their father Vincent reaches the end of his battle with cancer and enters hospice care at home, his daughters Katie, Rachel and Christina reunite in his New York City apartment. Though only his stepdaughter, Rachel had lived with him throughout his illness. Katie and Rachel argue over Rachel's marijuana smoking in the apartment and Rachel's failure to have Vincent sign a Do Not Resuscitate order while he was still fully lucid. Although Rachel insists Vincent did not mind her smoking, Katie makes Rachel do it outside as a sign of respect to her family. Katie criticizes Rachel after discovering there is no food in the fridge except three bags of apples.

Angel, a hospice worker, visits the home with nurse Mirabella and warns the sisters that their father could die very suddenly. Later, Katie struggles to write an obituary for Vincent, and Rachel obsesses over sports betting while refusing to go into the bedroom where Vincent is lying unconscious.

Angel tells the sisters that Vincent has progressed rapidly and will die soon. A point of contention becomes that when Vincent dies, Rachel will become the leaseholder of their family's longtime rent-controlled apartment. Katie in particular feels that Rachel is just "waiting for him to die" so she can inherit the apartment. The sisters briefly think that Vincent is dying; during the incident, Rachel still does not enter the room.

Rachel has her boyfriend Benjy over, who is frustrated with the way her sisters treat her, especially Katie, who despite living nearby in Brooklyn has rarely helped with Vincent. Though Rachel tells him not to, he confronts them, telling them off for treating Rachel poorly despite her being the only one taking care of their father for most of his decline, saying that when he eventually stopped eating anything but apples, Rachel was the one cutting them for him. He also reveals that he was friends with Vincent, and that although Katie had previously referred to him as "a stranger", he had met her the last time she visited, which he comments was "a few months" earlier.

Katie tries to apologize to Rachel, but Rachel angrily rejects the apology. The two fight, and Christina gets in the middle, furiously screaming that she hates them both. When Katie considers returning home, Christina apologizes for what she said to both of them and Katie apologizes to Rachel, but only for specifically being wrong about the apples. When Katie brings up the lease, Rachel says that she only stayed to take care of Vincent and will move out when he dies. The conversation culminates when Katie suggests that Rachel is less of Vincent's daughter, to which Rachel tearily responds that Vincent was the only father she ever had.

The next day, Katie and Rachel bond over Angel's repeated incorrect predictions of when Vincent will die, and the sisters' relationships begin to improve. Rachel helps Katie write Vincent's obituary, and finally enters Vincent's room to tell him about her parlay that day. Katie tells Rachel she should stay in the apartment. The three sisters enter Vincent's room together, and he asks them to move him to his favorite chair in the living room. Vincent suddenly rips off his medical equipment and begins walking around. To his shocked and delighted children, he monologues about his love for each of them, New York City, and the nature of life and death, only to look back at his chair and realize he died shortly after sitting down there.

Afterwards, the three sisters take turns sitting in his chair, then hold each other on the couch. Christina sings "Five Little Ducks", but Rachel interrupts her and replaces a line with "Daddy duck said 'beep, beep, beep, beeeeeep'" to laughter from her sisters, and Katie concludes the song with "all the crazy little ducks came back". Christina and Katie bid goodbye and return to their families while Rachel lives alone as the new owner of the apartment, but Rachel opts to smoke weed outside as her sister would have wanted.

== Cast ==
- Carrie Coon as Katie
- Natasha Lyonne as Rachel
- Elizabeth Olsen as Christina
- Rudy Galvan as Angel
- Jose Febus as Victor
- Jasmine Bracey as Nurse Mirabella
- Jay O. Sanders as Vincent "Vinny"
- Jovan Adepo as Benjy

== Production ==
Jacobs wrote the screenplay with the three actresses in mind, shooting it in a New York apartment, where the actors rehearsed for five days, while adapting to the space's inherent limitations. "We were forced to shoot this way because we were on the sixth floor,” Jacobs said. “We can’t hang lights through the outside. We can’t shoot daytime when it’s nighttime. We had to live true to what was happening.” The film was shot using Kodak Vision3 5219 35mm film on a single Arricam using a traditional dolly. It was edited with Adobe Premiere Pro.

== Release ==
His Three Daughters premiered at the Toronto International Film Festival on September 9, 2023. In October 2023, Netflix acquired worldwide distribution rights to the film for $7 million, later scheduling it to be released in select theaters on September 6, 2024, followed by a streaming release on September 20.

== Reception ==
On the review aggregator website Rotten Tomatoes, 98% of 140 critics' reviews are positive, with an average rating of 8.2/10. The website's consensus reads: "Dealing with thorny family dynamics while remaining warm as a throw blanket, His Three Daughters is a compelling showcase for Natasha Lyonne, Elizabeth Olsen, and Carrie Coon." Metacritic, which uses a weighted average, assigned the film a score of 84 out of 100, based on 37 critics, indicating "universal acclaim".

His Three Daughters has received critical acclaim, with Vanity Fair calling the film "a marvelous showcase", and The Hollywood Reporter lauding the three actresses’ performance as "exceptional".

The National Board of Review listed His Three Daughters was one of the ten best independent films of 2024. NPR included the film on its list of the best movies and TV of 2024, with critic Linda Holmes writing that it "plays close attention to the roles of guilt and obligation, as well as the blessing of simply being present for people."

=== Accolades ===
Award	Date of ceremony	Category	Recipient(s)	Result	Ref.
Savannah Film Festival	November 2, 2024	Maverick Award	Natasha Lyonne	Won	
Gotham Awards	December 2, 2024	Outstanding Supporting Performance	Natasha Lyonne	Nominated	
Gotham Awards	December 2, 2024	Best Screenplay	Azazel Jacobs	Won	
Michigan Movie Critics Guild	December 6, 2024	Best Supporting Actress	Natasha Lyonne	Nominated	
San Diego Film Critics Society	December 9, 2024	Best Supporting Actress	Natasha Lyonne	Nominated	
Chicago Film Critics Association	December 12, 2024	Best Supporting Actress	Natasha Lyonne	Won	
Seattle Film Critics Society	December 16, 2024	Best Ensemble Cast	His Three Daughters	Nominated	
Greater Western New York Film Critics Association	January 4, 2025	Best Supporting Actress	Natasha Lyonne	Won	
AARP Movies for Grownups Awards	January 11, 2025	Best Ensemble	His Three Daughters	Nominated	
AARP Movies for Grownups Awards	January 11, 2025	Best Intergenerational Movie	His Three Daughters	Nominated	
Independent Spirit Awards	February 22, 2025	Robert Altman Award	Azazel Jacobs, Nicole Arbusto, Jovan Adepo, Jasmine Bracey, Carrie Coon, Jose Febus, Rudy Galvan, Natasha Lyonne, Elizabeth Olsen, Randy Ramos Jr., and Jay O. Sanders	Won	

== Works cited ==
- Taubin, Amy (2024). "Offscreen Spaces". Filmmaker. Vol. 33, no. 1. The Gotham Film & Media Institute.
