= Her Socialist Smile =

Her Socialist Smile is a 2020 biopic of socialist writer Helen Keller. It was directed by John Gianvito and won the Independent/Experimental Film and Video Award at the 2020 Los Angeles Film Critics Association Awards.
