= Azazel Jacobs =

American filmmaker and director

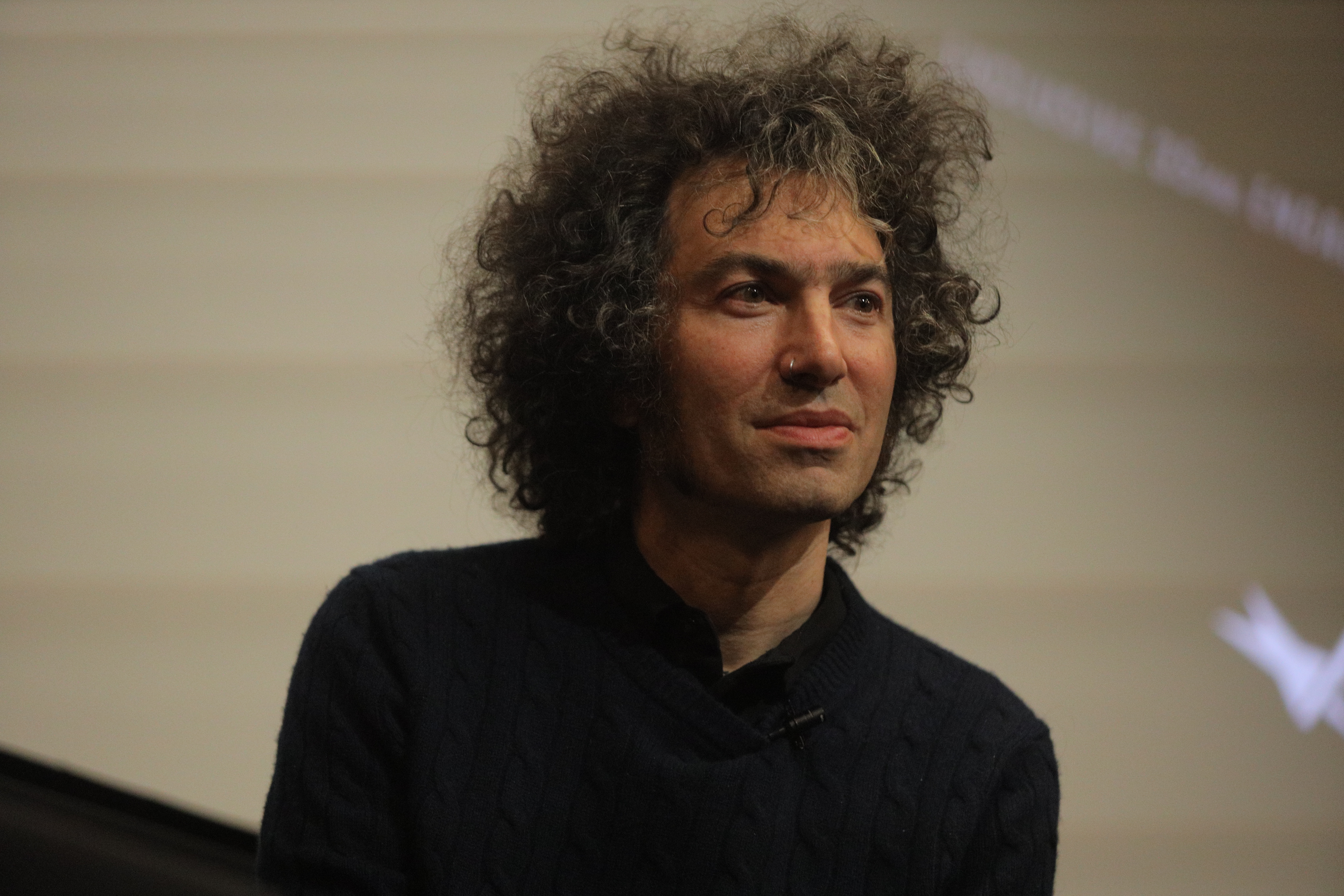
- Azazel Jacobs speaking at A.F.I. in 2024.
- Born: September 27, 1972 (age 53)
- Education: State University of New York at Purchase; AFI Conservatory
- Occupations: Film director, screenwriter
- Years active: 1997–present
- Relatives: Ken Jacobs (father)

Azazel Jacobs (born September 27, 1972) is an American film director and screenwriter. His feature films include The GoodTimesKid (2005), Terri (2011), The Lovers (2017), French Exit (2020), and His Three Daughters (2023).

== Biography ==
Jacobs grew up in a Jewish family in the Tribeca neighborhood of Manhattan. He is the son of experimental filmmaker Ken Jacobs. He attended Bayard Rustin High School. He received a bachelor's degree in film from SUNY Purchase and a master's degree from the AFI Conservatory. As of 2011, Jacobs lives in Los Angeles.

== Career ==
His feature The Goodtimeskid (2005), a micro-budget film, gained a cult following and was later re-released by KINO International. Jacobs' film Momma’s Man premiered at the Sundance Film Festival 2008. Upon its release by KINO International, The New York Times declared the film to be "Independent Film defined." In 2011, Jacobs film Terri starring John C. Reilly, was written by Patrick deWitt, premiered in competition at Sundance and in competition internationally at Locarno & the BFI London Film Festival’s "Film On The Square."

During 2014 and 2015, Jacobs directed the two seasons of the SKY/HBO show, Doll & Em. He also worked as a writer and producer. In 2017, Jacobs wrote and directed the film The Lovers which was released by A24 to top specialty box office. The film starred Debra Winger, Tracy Letts, Melora Walters, and Aidan Gillen. Jacobs’ screenplay for The Lovers was nominated for a 2017 Independent Spirit Award for Best Screenplay. Jacobs produced the pilot of Cherries, written/directed by Diaz Jacobs, which premiered in the episodic section of Sundance 2018.

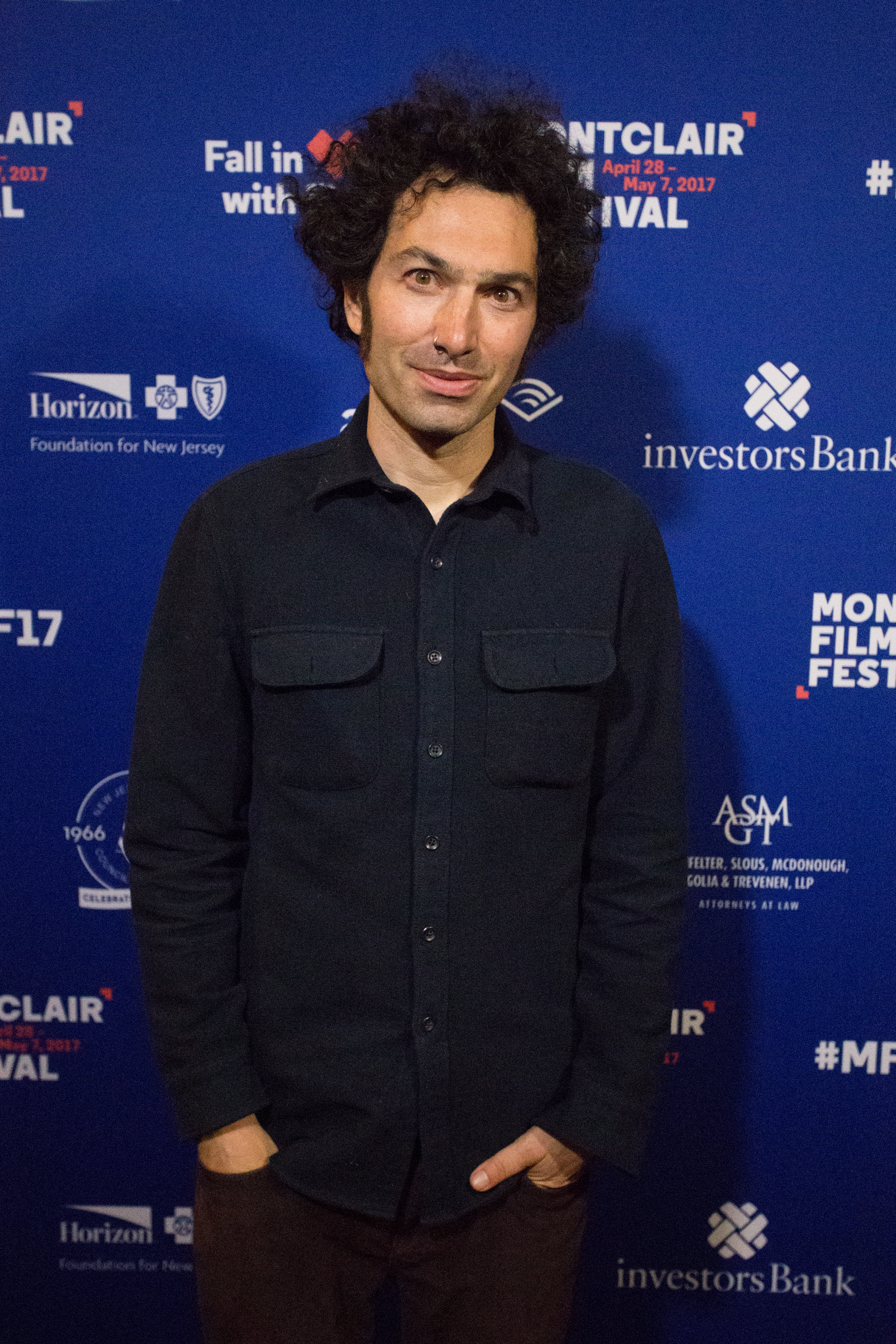
Jacobs in 2017

In 2020, Jacobs’ film French Exit had its world premiere as the closing night film for the New York Film Festival. The film is based on a novel of the same name by Patrick deWitt and stars Michelle Pfeiffer alongside Lucas Hedges, Tracy Letts, Imogen Poots, Danielle McDonald, Isaach de Bankole, Valerie Mahaffey, Susan Coyne and Daniel Di Tomasso. Pfeiffer plays Francis Price, which Variety called "a role for which she'll be remembered." It was nominated for multiple awards, including a 2021 Golden Globe, and won Best Actress from the Canadian Screen Awards. The film was released theatrically by Sony Pictures Classics on February 12, 2021, and internationally by Sony Pictures Worldwide on March 18, 2021. French Exit was selected for the 71st Berlin Film Festival in Berlinale Special Gala, having its European premier on June 12, 2021.

Azazel Jacobs film, His Three Daughters, had its world premiere at the 2023 Toronto International Film Festival where it was purchased by Netflix in a worldwide deal for a 2024 release. The film — which he wrote, directed, edited, and produced — stars Natasha Lyonne, Elizabeth Olsen and Carrie Coon in performances that have been widely hailed as amongst their best. The film received several major honors, including the Gotham Independent Film Award for Best Screenplay and the Independent Spirit Awards’ Robert Altman Award, and was named by the National Board of Review as one of the year's Top Ten Independent Films, in addition to being ranked No. 1 on Rolling Stone's year-end best films list.

Azazel Jacobs appeared on Marc Maron's podcast, WTF with Marc Maron, on March 29, 2021, speaking about art films, The Clash, Mad magazine, and his movies Terri, The Lovers and French Exit. Jacobs directed two episodes of the Facebook series Sorry For Your Loss starring Elizabeth Olsen, and three episodes of Amazon's Mozart in the Jungle, for which he was a consulting producer in its final season.

On April 19, 2024, an official remake of The Lovers, “Do Aur Do Pyaar”, told from a different perspective and different culture, was released in theaters across India. This production also marks the first remake of an A24 film.

== Filmography ==
=== Films ===
Year	Title	Director	Writer	Producer	Notes	Ref.
1997	Kirk and Kerry	Yes	No	No	Short film	
1999	Danger 44	Yes	No	No	Short film	
2000	Dear Mexico	Yes	No	No	Short film	
2002	Message Machine	Yes	No	No	Short film	
2003	Oh Wee!	Yes	No	No	Short film	
2003	Nobody Needs to Know	Yes	Yes	Yes	Feature film debut	
2005	The GoodTimesKid	Yes	Yes	No		
2008	Momma's Man	Yes	Yes	No		
2011	Terri	Yes	Yes	No		
2017	The Lovers	Yes	Yes	No		
2020	French Exit	Yes	No	Executive		
2023	His Three Daughters	Yes	Yes	Yes		

=== Television ===
Year	Title	Director	Writer	Producer	Network	Notes	Ref.
2013–2015	Doll & Em	Yes	Yes	Co-Producer	Sky Atlantic / HBO	12 episodes	
2016–2018	Mozart in the Jungle	Yes	No	Consulting	Amazon Prime Video	3 episodes	
2018–2019	Sorry for Your Loss	Yes	No	No	Facebook Watch	2 episodes	
2025	The Better Sister	Yes	No	No	Amazon Prime Video	1 episode	

== Recognition ==
In 2012, CinemaScope magazine cited Azazel as one of the 50 Best Directors Under 50.

Azazel Jacobs was invited to join The Academy of Motion Picture Arts and Sciences on June 26, 2025.

Azazel visited the Criterion Collection on November 6, 2024. He selected The Exterminating Angel (Luis Buñuel), Hobson’s Choice (David Lean), La vie de Bohème (Aki Kaurismäki), La Ciénaga (Lucrecia Martel), Girlfriends (Claudia Weill), Tōtem (Lila Avilés), Miracle in Milan (Vittorio De Sica), The Breakfast Club (John Hughes), and Pandora’s Box (G.W. Pabst).

Azazel was honored with the 2025 SUNY Purchase Alumni Association Honoree for Outstanding Commitment to the Arts, in recognition of his contributions to film and the creative arts community.

In 2025, Azazel was among the filmmakers invited to attend a Vatican gathering with Pope Leo XIV focused on cinema and the arts.

In 2026, Azazel Jacobs served as a juror for the U.S. Dramatic Competition at the Sundance Film Festival

== Awards and nominations ==
Year	Association	Category	Project	Result	Ref.
1997	Slamdance Film Festival	Grand Jury Prize for Best Dramatic Short	Kirk and Kerry	Won	
2008	Off Plus Camera	Kraków Film Award	Momma's Man	Won	
2008	Torino Film Festival	Best Feature Film Prize	Momma's Man	Nominated	
2008	Deauville Film Festival	Grand Special Prize	Momma's Man	Nominated	
2008	IndieLisboa International Independent Film Festival	FIPRESCI Award	Momma's Man	Won	
2008	IndieLisboa International Independent Film Festival	Distribution Award	Momma's Man	Won	
2008	Viennale	Reader Jury of the "Standard"	Momma's Man	Won	
2009	CPH PIX	Politiken's Audience Award	Momma's Man	Nominated	
2011	Deauville Film Festival	Grand Special Prize	Terri	Nominated	
2011	Gijón International Film Festival	FIPRESCI Award	Terri	Won	
2011	Locarno Film Festival	Junior Jury Award	Terri	3rd Place	
2011	Sundance Film Festival	Grand Jury Prize	Terri	Nominated	
2011	Sarasota Film Festival	Narrative Feature Jury Prize	Terri	Nominated	
2017	Film Independent Spirit Awards	Best Screenplay	The Lovers	Nominated	
2017	London Film Festival	Official Competition	The Lovers	Nominated	
2024	Gotham Awards	Best Screenplay	His Three Daughters	Won	
2024	Indiana Film Journalists Association	Best Original Screenplay	His Three Daughters	Nominated	
2024	Indiana Film Journalists Association	Best Ensemble Acting	His Three Daughters	Won	
2024	Las Vegas Film Critics Society Awards	Sierra Award, Best Original Screenplay	His Three Daughters	Nominated	
2024	National Board of Review	NBR Award Top Ten Independent Films	His Three Daughters	Won	
2024	Online Association of Female Film Critics	Best Original Screenplay	His Three Daughters	Nominated	
2024	Online Association of Female Film Critics	Rosie Award	His Three Daughters	Nominated	
2024	San Francisco Film Awards	Honors Award	His Three Daughters	Won	
2024	Seattle Film Critics Society	SFCS Award for Best Ensemble	His Three Daughters	Nominated	
2024	St. Louis Film Critics Association	SLFCA Award Special Merit (for best scene, cinematic technique or other memorable aspect or moment), Dad's chair	His Three Daughters	Nominated	
2024	VHS Awards	Best Original Screenplay	His Three Daughters	Nominated	
2024	VHS Awards	Best Ensemble Cast	His Three Daughters	2nd Place	
2025	AARP Movies for Grownups Awards	Best Intergenerational Film	His Three Daughters	Nominated	
2025	AARP Movies for Grownups Awards	Best Ensemble	His Three Daughters	Nominated	
2025	Chlotrudis Awards	Best Original Screenplay	His Three Daughters	Nominated	
2025	Chlotrudis Awards	Best Movie	His Three Daughters	Nominated	
2025	Chlotrudis Awards	Best Performance by an Ensemble Cast	His Three Daughters	Won	
2025	Columbus Film Critics Association	Best Overlooked Film	His Three Daughters	Nominated	
2025	Film Independent Spirit Awards	Robert Altman Award	His Three Daughters	Won	
2025	Utah Film Critics Association Awards	Best Screenplay	His Three Daughters	Won	
2025	Utah Film Critics Association Awards	Best Ensemble Cast	His Three Daughters	2nd Place	
