= French Exit (novel) =

2018 novel by Patrick deWitt

- First edition cover
- Author: Patrick deWitt
- Audio read by: Lorna Raver
- Cover artist: Eric Hanson (illustration); Allison Saltzman (design)
- Language: English
- Publisher: House of Anansi Press
- Publication date: August 28, 2018
- Publication place: Canada
- Media type: Print (paperback)
- Pages: 248
- ISBN: 978-1-4870-0483-5
- OCLC: 1035245009
- Dewey Decimal: 813/.6
- LC Class: PS3604.E923 F74 2018

French Exit is a 2018 novel by Canadian author Patrick deWitt. The novel was published by House of Anansi Press and received wide critical acclaim upon its publication, making the shortlist for the 2018 Giller Prize.

Set in New York City and Paris, the novel follows a dysfunctional mother and son duo who are forced to relocate after their fortunes fall.

The title French Exit refers to the expression also known as french leave of an abrupt or hasty departure made without informing anyone.

== Plot ==
Frances Price, a 65-year old wealthy widow, and her adult son Malcolm Price live together in New York City. When her financial planner reveals that she is completely insolvent, something he has been warning her about for the better part of a decade, Frances illegally sells everything that she owns and decides to take her childhood friend, Joan, up on the offer to live in her apartment in Paris.

Mother and son, along with their cat Small Frank, take a cruise ship to Paris. Onboard they meet a medium named Madeleine who tells them that Small Frank is inhabited by the spirit of Frances's deceased husband Frank, something both she and Malcolm were aware of.

Frances and Malcolm live a life of misery and near isolation in Paris. Frances begins to spend their remaining money lavishly, developing a "plan" to fix their circumstances. She informs Small Frank of her plan and he runs away.

In order to locate Small Frank, Frances has a friend hire an investigator to locate Madeleine. Madeleine is able to make contact with Small Frank who informs Malcolm and then everyone else that Frances intended to kill him and he has no intention of returning to her. Frances spends the rest of the week entertaining the various guests and friends she has made in Paris including Joan, who shows up believing that Frances intends to kill herself, and Malcolm's ex-fiancée Susan who is still in love with Malcolm and comes to Paris to be with him. Eventually, after spending all her money and reconciling somewhat with Susan, Frances kills herself.

== Reception ==
The novel drew wide critical acclaim. The Guardian praised deWitt's "comic genius". The New Yorker praised deWitt as a "stealth absurdist". Esquire named the novel as a Book of the Week and called it "a highly enjoyable read".

== Adaptation ==
In May 2019, it was announced that a movie adaptation of the novel was in the works with deWitt writing the screenplay, Azazel Jacobs directing, and Michelle Pfeiffer and Lucas Hedges in the lead roles. In September 2019, Sony Pictures Classics acquired distribution rights to the film. The film was the Closing Night of the 2020 New York Film Festival and celebrated as "A mostly satisfying feast for Pfeiffer fans."
