= The Monopoly of Violence =

2020 French documentary film

- Film poster
- French: Un pays qui se tient sage
- Directed by: David Dufresne
- Produced by: Jour 2 fête
- Release date: September 18, 2020 (NYFF)
- Running time: 86 minutes
- Country: France
- Language: French

The Monopoly of Violence (French: Un pays qui se tient sage, lit. 'A Very Well-Behaved Country') is a 2020 French documentary film directed by David Dufresne.

== Subject matter ==
The film questions riot control in France, as well as the legitimacy of the state's use of violence, especially police brutality in France.

The film depicts clashes between the police and demonstrators during the yellow vest movement. It uses footage from demonstrators and independent journalists and was shot from November 2018 to February 2020.

The images are discussed in a series of dialogues between representatives of social movements, intellectuals and police officers.

These two-way discussions allow interpretation of the raw material using key concepts such as the monopoly on violence.

== See also ==
- National Police (France)
- Police brutality
