= Patrick deWitt =

Canadian novelist and screenwriter

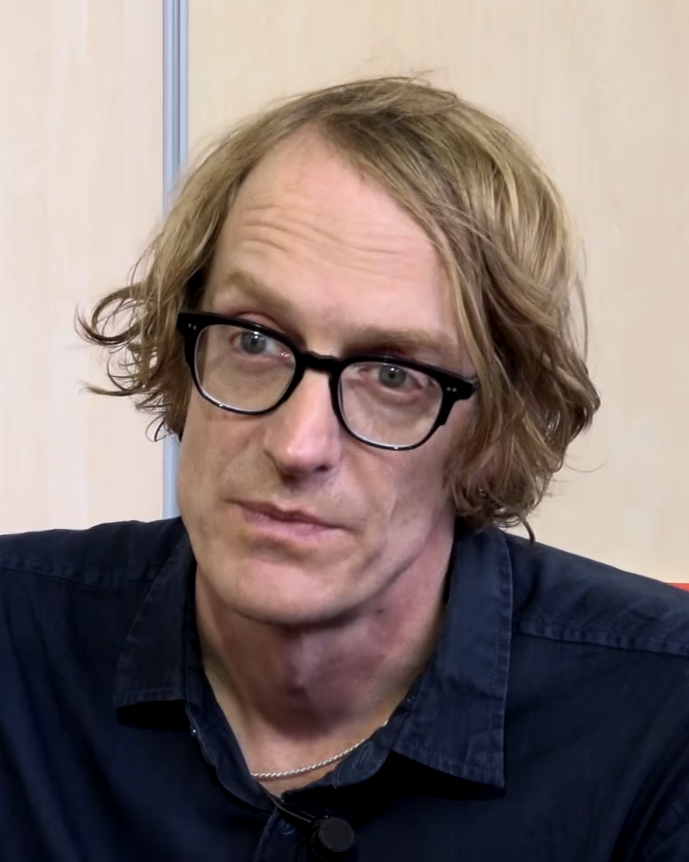
- Patrick deWitt in 2018
- Born: 1975 (age 50–51); Sidney, British Columbia, Canada
- Citizenship: Canada; United States
- Occupation: Writer
- Children: 1
- Writing career
- Period: 2000s–present
- Notable works: The Sisters Brothers (2011); French Exit (2018)

Patrick deWitt (born 1975) is a Canadian novelist and screenwriter. Born on Vancouver Island, deWitt lives in Portland, Oregon, and has acquired American citizenship. As of 2026, he has written six novels: Ablutions (2009), The Sisters Brothers (2011), Undermajordomo Minor (2015), French Exit (2018), and The Librarianist (2023), and Dodge City (2026).

== Biography ==
DeWitt was born on Vancouver Island in Sidney, British Columbia. The second of three brothers, he spent his childhood moving back and forth across the west coast of North America. He credits his father, a carpenter, with giving him his "lifelong interest in literature." DeWitt dropped out of high school to become a writer. He moved to Los Angeles, working at a bar. He left Los Angeles to move back in with his parents in the Seattle area, on Bainbridge Island. When he sold his first book, Ablutions (2009), deWitt quit his job as a construction worker to become a writer, and moved to Portland, Oregon.

Although born a Canadian citizen, deWitt was raised primarily in Southern California and later became a U.S. citizen. He married Leslie Napoles, an American, with whom he has a son. He is separated from his wife, but they are amicable and share the care of their son.

== Career ==
His first book, Ablutions: Notes for a Novel (2009), was named a New York Times Editors' Choice book. His second, The Sisters Brothers (2011), is a Western picaresque novel that follows two assassin brothers who are sent to kill a prospector during the California gold rush. It shortlisted for the 2011 Man Booker Prize, the 2011 Scotiabank Giller Prize, the Rogers Writers' Trust Fiction Prize, and the 2011 Governor General's Award for English-language fiction. He was one of two Canadian writers, alongside Esi Edugyan, to make all four award lists in 2011. On November 1, 2011, he was announced as the winner of the Rogers Prize, and on November 15, 2011, he was announced as the winner of Canada's 2011 Governor General's Award for English-language fiction. On April 26, 2012, the novel won the 2012 Stephen Leacock Award. Alongside Edugyan, The Sisters Brothers was also a shortlisted nominee for the 2012 Walter Scott Prize for historical fiction. The Sisters Brothers was adapted as a film of the same name by Jacques Audiard and Thomas Bidegain, and released in 2018.

His third novel, Undermajordomo Minor, was published in 2015. The novel was longlisted for the 2015 Scotiabank Giller Prize.

His fourth novel, French Exit, was published in August 2018 by Ecco Press, an imprint of HarperCollins. It follows the dysfunctional relationship between a wealthy widow and her aimless adult son as they flee New York for Paris after burning through her late husband's fortune. The book was named as a shortlisted finalist for the 2018 Giller Prize. He wrote the screenplay for the 2020 film of the same name.

In 2019, deWitt had a small role in First Cow, a film directed by his friend Kelly Reichardt.

The Librarianist, was published on July 4, 2023, by Ecco Press. It follows a retired librarian named Bob Comet and is billed as a "wide-ranging and ambitious document of the introvert's condition." It was the winner of the 2024 Stephen Leacock Memorial Medal for Humour.

Dodge City was published in 2026, and was longlisted for the 2026 Giller Prize.

== Bibliography ==
=== Novels ===
- Ablutions: Notes for a Novel (2009)
- The Sisters Brothers (2011)
- Undermajordomo Minor (2015)
- French Exit (2018)
- The Librarianist (2023)
- Dodge City (2026)

=== Nonfiction ===
- Help Yourself Help Yourself (2007)

=== Screenplays ===
- Terri (2011)
- French Exit (2020)
