= French Exit (2020 film) =

2020 film by Azazel Jacobs

- Theatrical release poster
- Directed by: Azazel Jacobs
- Screenplay by: Patrick deWitt
- Based on: French Exit by Patrick deWitt
- Produced by: Christine Habeler; Christina Piovesan; Noah Segal; Trish Dolman; Katie Holly; Oliver Glass
- Starring: Michelle Pfeiffer; Lucas Hedges; Valerie Mahaffey; Imogen Poots; Susan Coyne; Danielle Macdonald; Isaach de Bankolé; Tracy Letts
- Cinematography: Tobias Datum
- Edited by: Hilda Rasula
- Music by: Nick deWitt
- Production companies: Evolution Entertainment; Rocket Science; Screen Siren Pictures; Elevation Pictures; Blinder Films; Terminal City Pictures; Saalgo Productions; Telefilm Canada
- Distributed by: Elevation Pictures (Canada); Sony Pictures Classics; Stage 6 Films (international)
- Release dates: October 11, 2020 (NYFF); February 12, 2021 (Canada)
- Running time: 110 minutes
- Countries: Canada; United Kingdom
- Language: English
- Box office: $1.6 million

French Exit is a 2020 black comedy drama film directed by Azazel Jacobs and adapted by Patrick deWitt from his 2018 novel. It tells the story of a Manhattan heiress (Michelle Pfeiffer) who moves to Paris with her son (Lucas Hedges) with the little money they have left.

The film had its world premiere at the New York Film Festival on October 10, 2020, and was theatrically released in the United States and Canada on February 12, 2021. It received mixed reviews from critics, although Pfeiffer's performance was praised and she was nominated for the Golden Globe Award for Best Actress in a Motion Picture – Musical or Comedy.

== Plot ==
The bank seizes all the property of Manhattan heiress Frances Price several years after her husband's death. The close-to-penniless widow and her son, Malcolm, are left with few options. They sell everything in their house and relocate to a small apartment in Paris owned by Frances' sister, with the family cat, who happens to be Frances' reincarnated husband.

On the ship passage to Europe, Malcolm meets the fortune teller Madeleine, who predicts the death of a passenger, which occurs shortly afterwards. Madeleine recognizes the connection between the cat Small Frank and her deceased husband, Franklin Price.

Once in Paris, Frances befriends her neighbor, Mme. Reynard. After Frances tries to strangle Small Frank, it escapes. Frances hires private investigator Julius to find Madeleine, who then holds a séance in which Franklin speaks to them. In flashbacks, the audience learns of the death of Franklin, whom Frances found lying dead on the bed with the cat sitting on it, but only informed the police days later. Malcolm questions his birth and Frances explains that Franklin left them both immediately afterwards.

Malcolm calls his fiancée, Susan, whom he left behind in New York. However, she is back together with her previous fiancé, Tom. The two visit Malcolm in the Paris apartment, as Susan has feelings for him after Malcolm's call. Tom leaves Paris after a confrontation and Susan stays with Malcolm.

In a second séance with Madeleine alone, Frances gets even with Franklin. Frances then walks through the streets of Paris, pursued by Small Frank.

The movie ends with the continuation of the flashback, in which Frances picks Malcolm up from school and tells him that, from now on, he will have to get along with her.

== Cast ==
- Michelle Pfeiffer as Frances Price
- Lucas Hedges as Malcolm Price
- Valerie Mahaffey as Mme. Reynard
- Imogen Poots as Susan
- Susan Coyne as Joan
- Danielle Macdonald as Madeleine the medium
- Isaach de Bankolé as Julius
- Daniel Di Tomasso as Tom
- Tracy Letts as Franklin Price (voice)

== Production ==
It was announced in May 2019 that Michelle Pfeiffer, Lucas Hedges and Tracy Letts were cast in the film, with Azazel Jacobs directing and the novel's author Patrick deWitt writing the screenplay. Danielle Macdonald was cast in October.

=== Filming ===
Principal photography began in October 2019, with Paris and Montreal as the filming locations.

== Release ==
In September 2019, Sony Pictures Classics acquired distribution rights to the film for the U.S., U.K., Germany, France, Italy, Japan, China and worldwide airlines; its sister company Sony Pictures Worldwide Acquisitions had previously acquired all other rights excluding Canada and Switzerland. It had its world premiere at the New York Film Festival on October 10, 2020.

On August 20, 2020, the studio scheduled the film to be released on February 12, 2021. In February 2021, it was announced the film would begin a limited release in New York City and Los Angeles on February 12, before going wide on April 2.

It was selected to be presented to Berlin Film Festival in the section Berlin Special Titles.

== Reception ==
=== Critical response ===
On review aggregator Rotten Tomatoes, 64% of 181 critic reviews are positive, with an average rating of 6.1/10. The website's critics consensus reads: "The smartly written French Exit offers proof that even the most caustic characters can be made entertaining – and even relatable – through a Michelle Pfeiffer performance." According to Metacritic, which reports a weighted average score of 56 out of 100, based on 32 critics, the film received "mixed or average reviews".

David Ehrlich of IndieWire gave the film a "B−" and wrote: "Jacobs doesn't give us much else to hold on to. For all of its touching moments – and a series of closing grace notes that shimmer with a mystical flair missing from the rest of the film – this gossamer-thin adaptation is hampered by the same ambivalence that's haunted [Pfeiffer's character] Frances for so long."

Pfeiffer received critical acclaim for her performance with many critics dubbing it Oscar-worthy and Variety's Pete Dubruge writing that she delivered a role "for which she'll be remembered."

=== Accolades ===
Award	Date of ceremony	Category	Recipient	Result	Ref.
Satellite Awards	February 15, 2021	Best Actress in a Motion Picture – Musical or Comedy	Michelle Pfeiffer	Nominated	
Golden Globe Awards	February 28, 2021	Best Actress in a Motion Picture – Musical or Comedy	Michelle Pfeiffer	Nominated	
Canadian Screen Awards	May 20, 2021	Best Actress	Michelle Pfeiffer	Won	
Independent Spirit Awards	April 22, 2021	Best Supporting Female	Valerie Mahaffey	Nominated	
