= Dan Stiles =

American designer (b. 1970s)

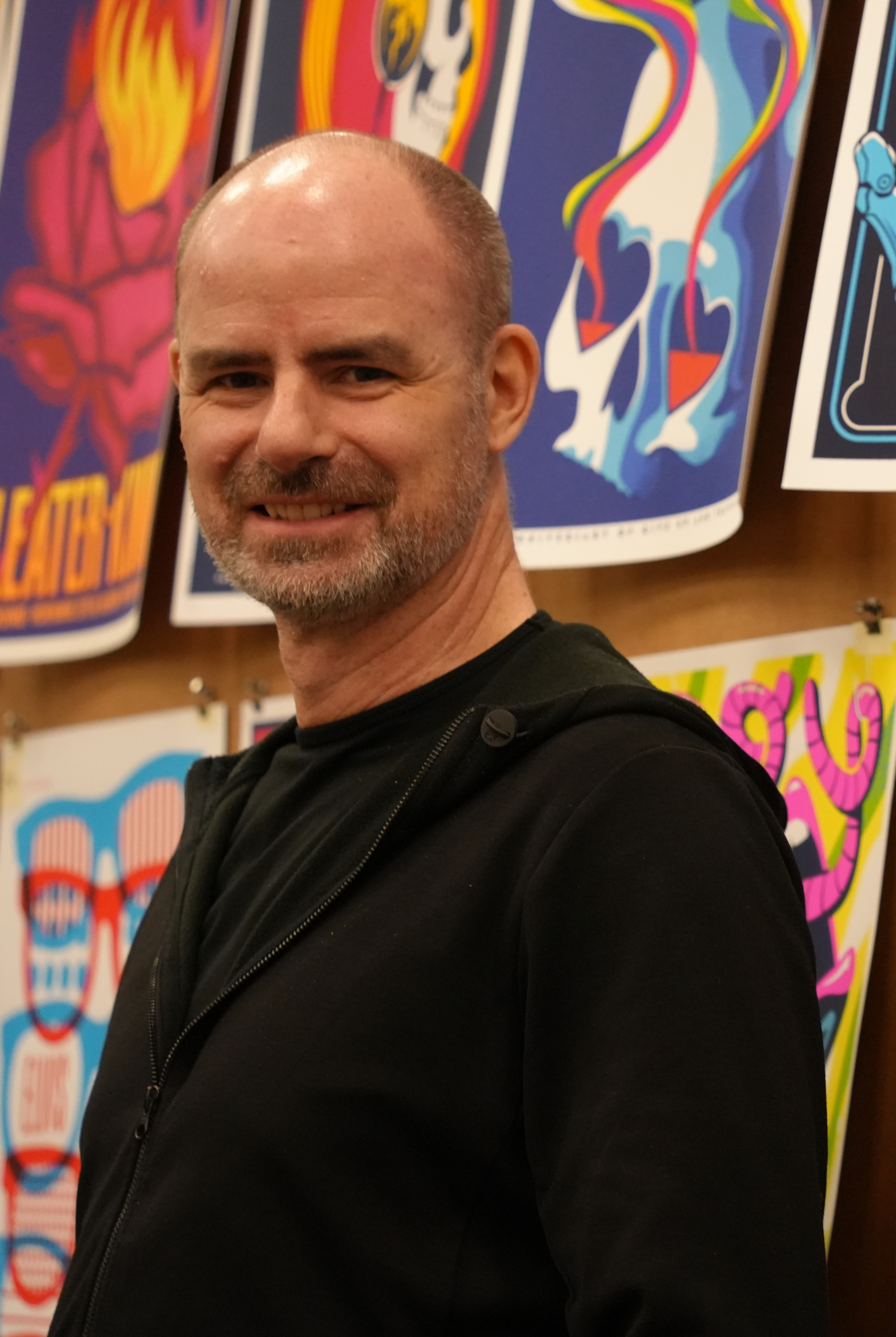
- Stiles at Flatstock SXSW 2025
- Born: c. 1970s United States
- Education: University of Oregon, California College of the Arts
- Occupations: Graphic artist, graphic designer
- Known for: Rock music posters
- Website: www.danstiles.com

Dan Stiles is an American graphic artist and graphic designer, known for his rock posters. He is based in Portland, Oregon.

== Early life ==
Stiles is originally from Ann Arbor, Michigan. He attended the University of Oregon (UO) in Eugene, later noting that he had "used college as an excuse to move to the Northwest" to pursue music and snowboarding. After several years working in the Pacific Northwest he moved to San Francisco in 1996 to study design at the California College of the Arts (CCA).

He lived and worked in San Francisco for 7 years, before returning to Portland, Oregon in 2001.

== Career ==
While at UO, he began his career as an artist by drawing rock posters. Soon, Stiles learned how to silkscreen posters and moved into digital illustration. Stiles has since remarked on how digital creation is a more freeing process. "With a computer... you can draw all of this stuff and then... throw [it] out, keep going," he remarked in an interview with WeMake.

After gaining notoriety with his poster art, Stiles attracted the attention of brands like Nike, AT&T, Birch Fabrics, IBM, and the X Games. He has also worked on projects for bands like Band of Horses, Feist, Death Cab for Cutie, Vampire Weekend, Hot Chip, and Arcade Fire.

PowerHouse Books released a monograph of his work entitled One Thing Leads to Another (2015). Stiles has also authored several books with POW!, the children's division of powerHouse Books. These include Put on Your Shoes!, Baby's First Book Blocks, and Today I'm Going to Wear...

Stiles appears in the rock poster documentary film, Just like Being There (2012).

== Style ==
Stiles utilizes colorful geometric shapes in a style that has been described as "punk rock modern" and "pop folk." He is usually allowed a fair amount of creative control in his work; Stiles told WeMake that bands often tell him to "just do something cool." According to Stiles, each of his posters has its own significance, as he views them as "his children."
