= Molly McMichael =

American actress (1993)

- Born: c. 1993; Dallas, Texas, U.S.
- Occupation: Actress
- Years active: 2012–present

Molly McMichael (born c. 1993) is an American actress from Dallas, Texas.

McMichael served as a production assistant for the short film Where Snakes Roam. In 2012, she starred in the Lifetime television pilot The Secret Lives of Wives in the role of a cafe patron, and in the film adaptation of Men, Women & Children as a high school student. McMichael's first starring appearance was as Rebecca Pit in the History Channel miniseries Texas Rising, which premiered on May 25, 2015. That same year, she starred in Hannah Fidell's romantic drama film 6 Years, alongside Taissa Farmiga and Ben Rosenfield, portraying the role of Jessica. The film had its world premiere at South by Southwest on March 14, 2015.

== Filmography ==
Film and television
Title	Year	Role	Notes
2012	The Secret Lives of Wives	Cafe Patron	Unsold pilot
2014	Men, Women & Children	High School Student	Uncredited
2015	6 Years	Jessica	
2015	Texas Rising	Rebecca Pit	Miniseries; 4 episodes
2017-2019	I'm Sorry	Amy	
