= Ben Rosenfield =

American actor and musician

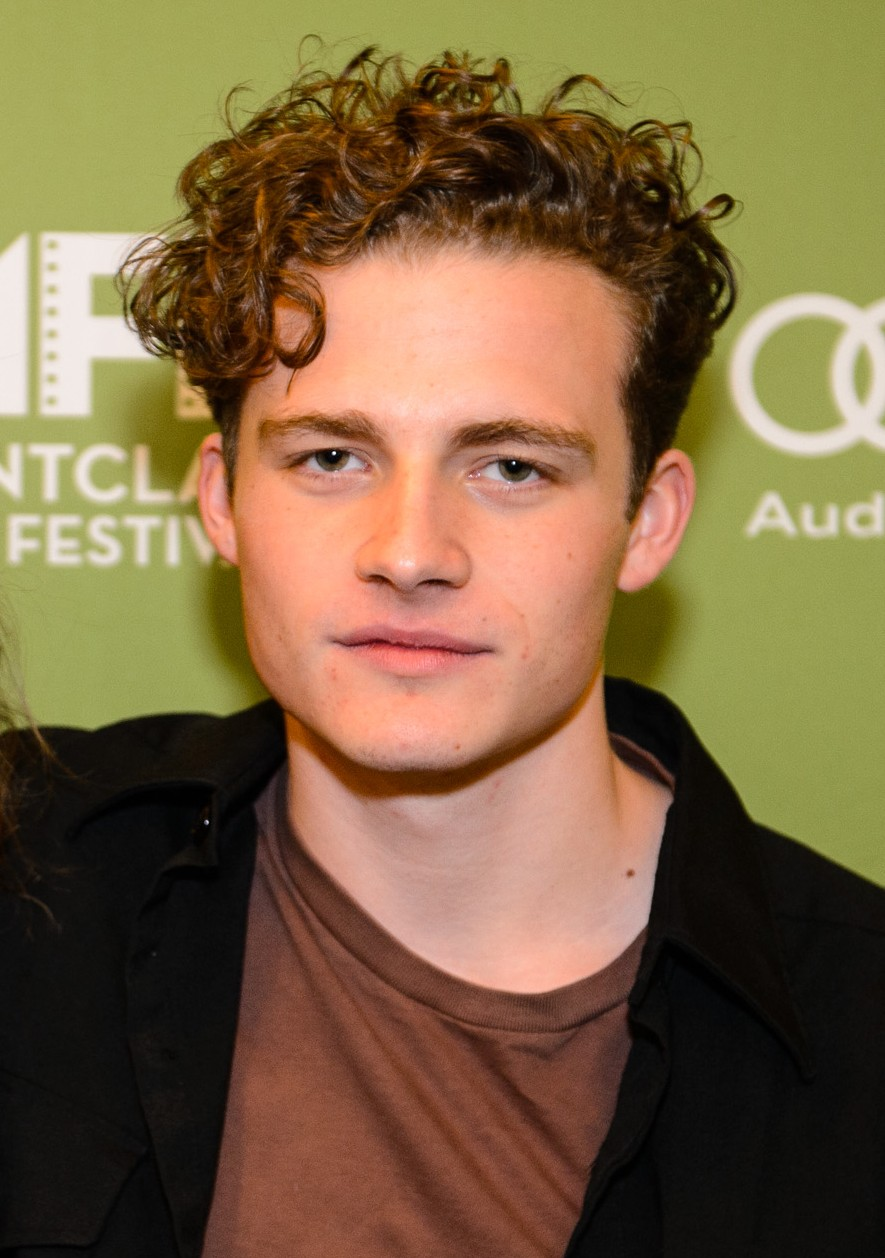
- Rosenfield at the 2014 Montclair Film Festival
- Occupations: Actor; Musician
- Years active: 2010–present

Ben Rosenfield is an American actor and musician. He is best known for playing Willie Thompson on the fourth and fifth seasons of HBO's period crime drama series Boardwalk Empire (2013–2014). He starred in leading roles in Greetings from Tim Buckley (2012), Affluenza (2014), and 6 Years (2016) as well as supporting roles in Song One (2014), Indignation (2016), Person to Person (2017), and Mickey and the Bear (2019).

On television, he portrayed Sam Colby in Twin Peaks: The Return (2017), and played John Schlafly in the Hulu limited series Mrs. America. He also had supporting roles in Netflix docu-series The Family in 2019, and the Amazon Prime comedy series The Marvelous Mrs. Maisel in 2023.

Rosenfeld's first role on the Off-Broadway stage was as Max in the adaptation of the Ingmar Bergman film Through a Glass Darkly at the Atlantic Theater Company. He has since acted in Jennifer Haley's science fiction play The Nether (2015), and Simon Stephens' family drama On the Shore of the Wide World (2017). He currently stars in Itamar Moses' political comedy-drama The Ally (2024) at The Public Theater.

== Early life ==
Rosenfield was raised in Montclair, New Jersey. His father, Stephen Rosenfield, is a teacher of stand-up comedy and the founder of the American Comedy Institute in New York City. His mother, Kate Redway Rosenfield, is an actress and teaches improv. Rosenfield has one younger brother, Nate. He is Jewish, and has said that he "used to be rather religious" despite his family's atheism. His ancestors were from Ukraine, Romania, Denmark, and Scotland.

Rosenfield attended Glenfield Middle School where, in eighth grade, he portrayed Tevye in a production of Fiddler on the Roof. He then attended and graduated from Montclair High School in 2010.

== Career ==
In 2011, Rosenfield made his stage debut in the Off-Broadway production of the play Through a Glass Darkly, alongside Carey Mulligan and Chris Sarandon. In August of the same year, it was announced that Rosenfield had been cast to co-star as Tim Buckley in the drama film Greetings from Tim Buckley (2012). The film also featured Penn Badgley and Imogen Poots in main roles. The following year, he starred as Tommie Scheel in the documentary film Teenage, and joined the cast of Boardwalk Empire in the recurring role of Willie Thompson, Eli's (Shea Whigham) son. For the fifth and final season, he was promoted to a series regular. Rosenfield then co-starred in the films Jamesy Boy (2014) and Song One (2014), before having his first leading role in the film Affluenza (2014), which also starred Grant Gustin and Nicola Peltz. Also in 2014, Rosenfield appeared in a supporting role in the crime drama A Most Violent Year, opposite Jessica Chastain and Oscar Isaac.

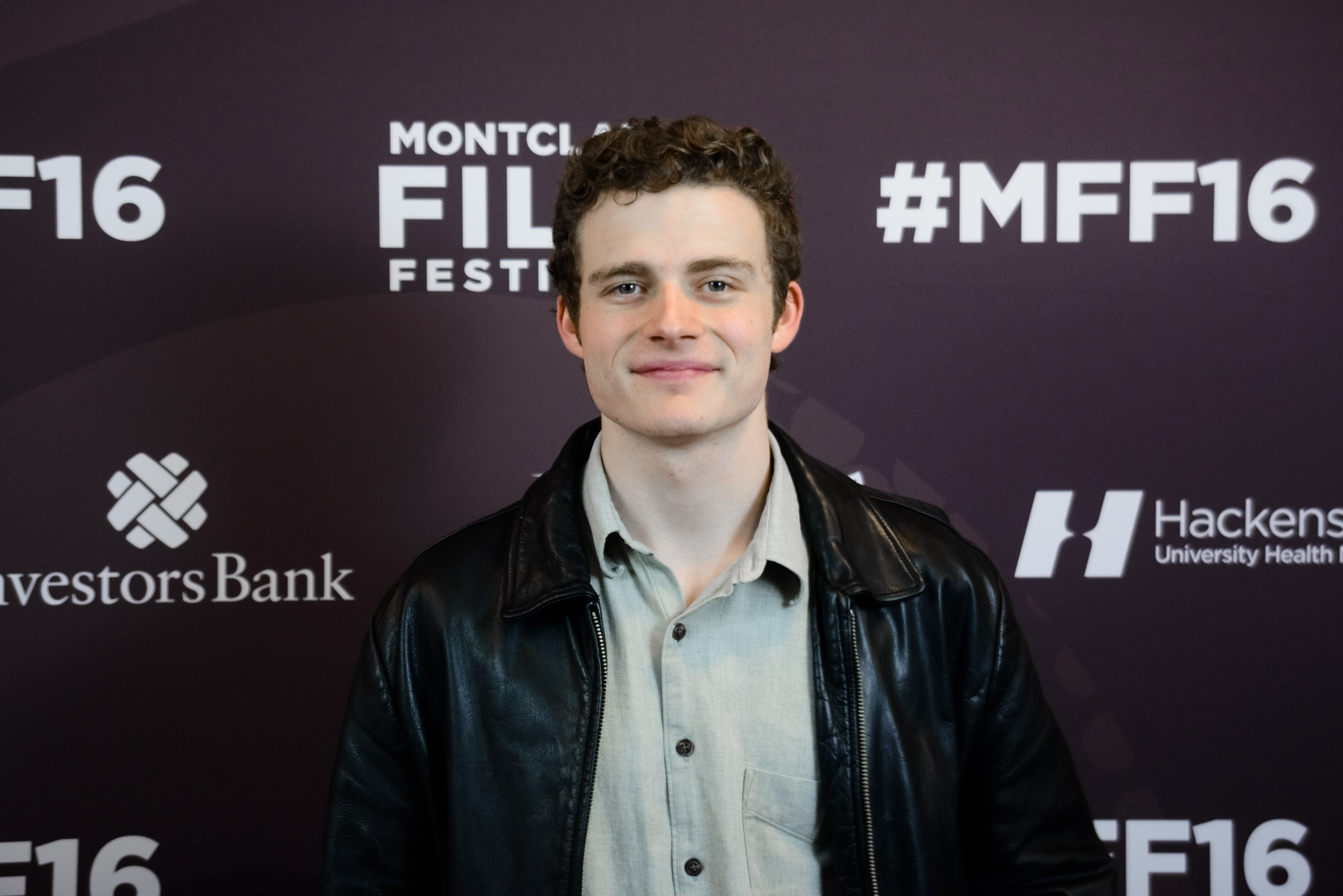
Rosenfield at the Montclair Film Festival in May 2016

In January 2015, Rosenfield was cast as Woodnut in Jennifer Haley's play The Nether with the MCC Theater, which ran from February 4 to March 15, 2015 at the Lucille Lortel Theatre. Rosenfield then portrayed Dan Mercer in Hannah Fidell's relationship drama film 6 Years, starring opposite Taissa Farmiga. The film had its world premiere at South by Southwest on March 14, 2015, and was released on Netflix on August 18, 2015.

He next had a supporting role in Woody Allen's comedy-drama Irrational Man, co-starring Joaquin Phoenix and Emma Stone. The film premiered at the 2015 Cannes Film Festival and was released in theaters on July 17, 2015. Rosenfield then co-starred as Bertram Flusser (alongside Logan Lerman) in the drama film Indignation, an adaptation of Philip Roth's 2008 novel of the same name, which premiered at the 2016 Sundance Film Festival on January 24, 2016 and was released to theaters on July 29, 2016. Also in 2016, he starred alongside Richard Armitage and Zoe Kazan in the Off-Broadway play Love, Love, Love, from the Roundabout Theatre Company. Rosenfield is part of the ensemble cast of the drama film Person to Person, which premiered at the 2017 Sundance Film Festival. He was also cast as Sam Colby in the Showtime series revival of David Lynch's Twin Peaks.

In 2017, Rosenfield portrayed Alex Holmes in the Off-Broadway premiere of the Simon Stephens play On the Shore of the Wide World. He was also seen in the comedy film The Long Dumb Road, re-teaming with director Hannah Fidell.

In 2019, Ben played the role of Aron Church, in the film Mickey and the Bear directed by Annabelle Attanasio. The film premiered at the SXSW Film Festival where it was acquired for theatrical distribution by Utopia. The film went on to play to rave reviews at the 2019 Cannes film festival.

In 2020, Rosenfield starred opposite Cate Blanchett in the recurring role of John Schlafly, in the FX limited series Mrs. America. Mrs. America was nominated for 10 Emmy Awards including Outstanding Limited Series. . In February 2020 it was announced that Rosenfield had been cast in the Lead role of Mark in Hannah Marks upcoming feature film Mark, Mary & Some Other People.

== Music ==
In December 2014, Rosenfield released an EP titled Field on Bandcamp and began playing shows at clubs around NYC. In February 2017, he released a full-length album titled dum die on Bandcamp. The song "Angel in the Sky" on Rosenfield's album was used in the score of the film Mickey and the Bear. Rosenfield recorded several songs with Jenny Lewis for the soundtrack to the film Song One.

== Filmography ==
=== Film ===
Year	Title	Role	Notes
2010	The Virgins	Boy	Short film
2012	Greetings from Tim Buckley	Tim Buckley	
2013	Teenage	Tommie Scheel	Documentary
2013	Louder Than Words	Michael Fareri	
2013	Passerby	Enoch Rothstein	Short film
2014	Jamesy Boy	Chris Cesario	
2014	Song One	Henry Ellis	
2014	Affluenza	Fisher Miller	
2014	A Most Violent Year	Sales Student Alex	
2015	6 Years	Dan Mercer	
2015	Irrational Man	April's Friend #1	
2015	Have Had	Adam	Short film; also writer and producer
2016	Indignation	Bertram Flusser	
2017	Person to Person	River	
2019	Mickey and the Bear	Aron Church	
2021	Mark, Mary & Some Other People	Mark	

=== Television ===
Year	Title	Role	Notes
2013	Live from Lincoln Center	Enoch Snow Jr	Episode: "Carousel"
2013–2014	Boardwalk Empire	Willie Thompson	9 episodes
2017	Twin Peaks	Sam Colby	2 episodes
2019	The Family	Ivanwald Brother	Netflix documentary series
2020	Mrs. America	John Schlafly	7 episodes
2023	The Marvelous Mrs. Maisel	Older Ethan Maisel	2 episodes

== Stage ==
Year	Title	Role	Location
2011	Through a Glass Darkly	Max	Atlantic Theater Company, Off-Broadway
2015	The Nether	Mr. Woodnut	Lucille Lortel Theatre, Off-Broadway
2016	Love Love Love	Jamie	Roundabout Theatre Company, Off-Broadway
2017	On the Shore of the Wide World	Alex Holmes	Atlantic Theater Company, Off-Broadway
2024	The Ally	Reuven	The Public Theater, Off-Broadway

== Awards and nominations ==
Year	Association	Category	Work	Result
2013	Screen Actors Guild Awards	Outstanding Performance by an Ensemble in a Drama Series	Boardwalk Empire	Nominated
