= Andrew Droz Palermo =

American cinematographer

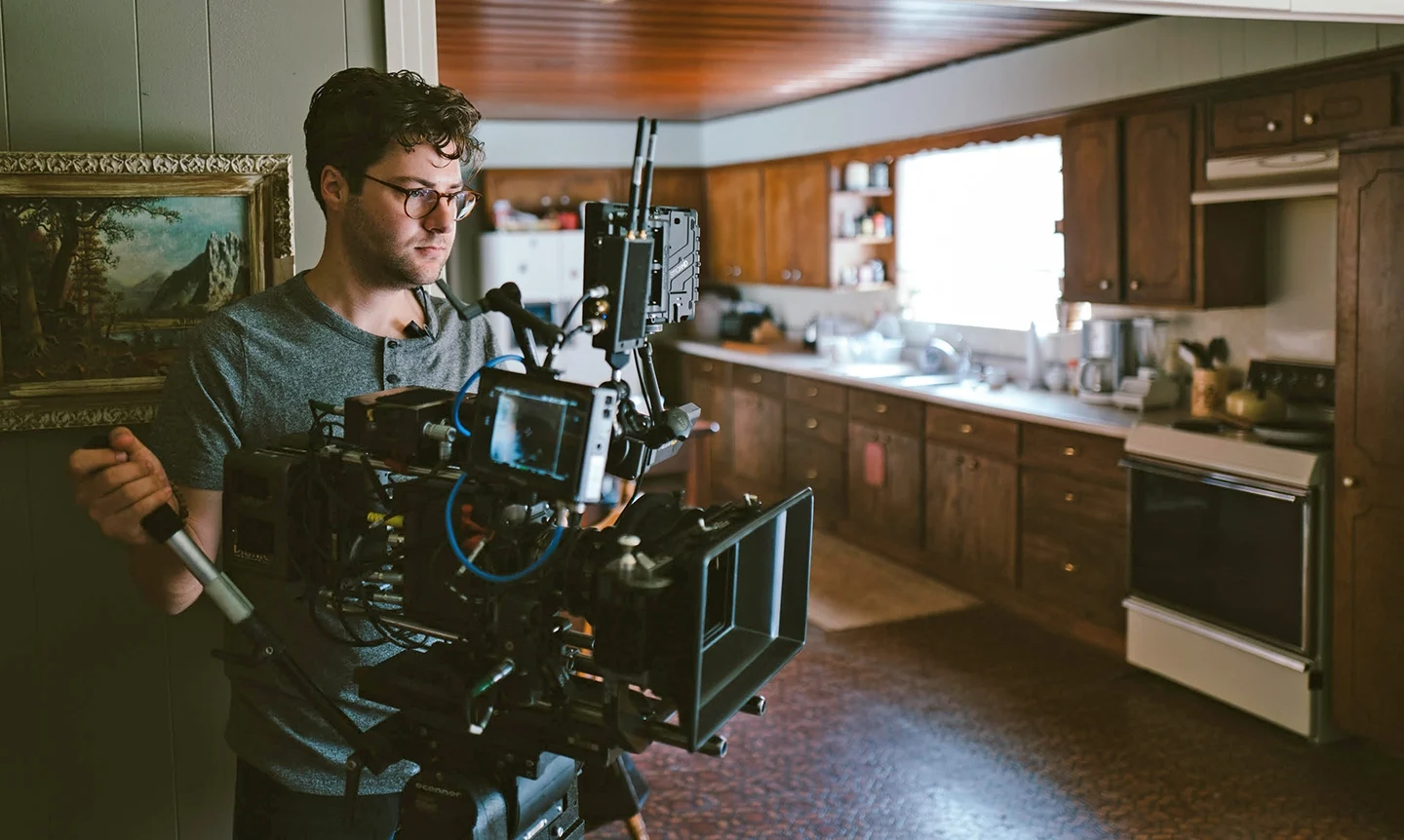
- Born: Columbia, Missouri, U.S.
- Years active: 2009–present

Andrew Droz Palermo, ASC is an American cinematographer and director.

== Early life ==
Palermo was born in Columbia, Missouri, and was raised in Jefferson City, Missouri.

== Career ==
Palermo frequently collaborates with director David Lowery, serving as the cinematographer on his films The Green Knight, A Ghost Story, and a television show Strange Angel. He also works with Hannah Fidell, shooting her films The Gathering Squall, Man & Gun, A Teacher, 6 Years, and The Long Dumb Road. He also served as the cinematographer on You're Next and V/H/S (also actor of role "Fifth Thug" in segment "Tape 56"), both directed by Adam Wingard.

In 2014, Palermo co-directed Rich Hill, a documentary that won the Documentary Grand Jury Prize at the 2014 Sundance Film Festival, a collaboration with his cousin Tracy Droz Tragos. Palermo also directed One & Two, starring Kiernan Shipka and Timothée Chalamet. It had its world premiere at the 2015 Berlin International Film Festival.

In 2023, Palermo became a member of the American Society of Cinematographers.

== Filmography ==
=== Cinematographer ===
==== Feature film ====
Key
†	Denotes films that have not yet been released

Year	Title	Director	Notes
2011	You're Next	Adam Wingard	
2013	A Teacher	Hannah Fidell	
2015	6 Years	Hannah Fidell	
2017	A Ghost Story	David Lowery	
2018	The Long Dumb Road	Hannah Fidell	
2019	The True Adventures of Wolfboy	Martin Krejčí	
2021	The Green Knight	David Lowery	
2025	Thunderbolts*	Jake Schreier	
2026	Mother Mary	David Lowery	With Rina Yang
2026	Saturn Return †	Greg Kwedar	

==== Television ====
Year	Title	Director	Notes
2015	Independent Lens	Himself; Tracy Droz Tragos	Segment Rich Hill
2018	Strange Angel	David Lowery; Nelson McCormick; Ben Wheatley; Steph Green; Kate Dennis	6 episodes
2022	Moon Knight	Justin Benson; Aaron Moorhead	Episodes "Summon the Suit" and "The Tomb"

=== Director ===
Short film

Year	Title	Director	Writer	Producer	Editor
2011	A Face Fixed	Yes	Yes	Yes	Yes

Feature film

Year	Title	Director	Writer
2015	One & Two	Yes	Yes

Television

Year	Title	Note
2015	Independent Lens	Segment Rich Hill
