= Spencer Lofranco =

Italian-Canadian actor (1992–2025)

- Lofranco in 2013
- Born: Spencer Rocco Lofranco; October 18, 1992; Toronto, Canada
- Died: November 18, 2025 (aged 33); British Columbia, Canada
- Occupation: Actor
- Years active: 2012–2018
- Height: 180 cm (5 ft 11 in)

Spencer Rocco Lofranco (October 18, 1992 – November 18, 2025) was a Canadian actor, businessman, entrepreneur and painter. He made his film debut in the 2013 romantic comedy At Middleton as Conrad Hartman, and portrayed the lead role of James Burns in the 2014 crime drama Jamesy Boy. He then co-starred as Harry Brooks in the biographical war drama Unbroken (2014) and as Billy in the crime drama Dixieland (2015). He also had a supporting role as Mikey in King Cobra (2016) and portrayed John A. Gotti in Gotti (2018).

== Early life ==
Spencer Rocco Lofranco was born in Toronto, on October 18, 1992. His parents were lawyer Rocco (Rocky) C. Lofranco and Amy Lofranco, an opera singer. His parents divorced when he was a child. He had one older brother, Santino, and was raised in Thornhill, Ontario. He attended Robert Land Academy military school from ninth grade through twelfth grade, after struggling with the traditional school system.

== Career ==
On June 19, 2012, Lofranco was cast as Conrad Hartman, a high school senior touring a college campus, in the independent romantic comedy At Middleton. He starred alongside Andy García and Vera Farmiga in the film, which premiered at the Seattle International Film Festival on May 17, 2013, and was released in a limited release and through on video on demand on January 31, 2014.

He had his first starring role as troubled teenager James Burns, in Trevor White's biographical crime drama film Jamesy Boy. The film also starred Mary-Louise Parker, Ving Rhames, and Taissa Farmiga, and was released on January 3, 2014, through video on demand before being released on January 17, 2014, in a limited release.

In 2014, he co-starred in the war drama Unbroken as Harry Brooks, opposite Jack O'Connell, Finn Wittrock, and Domhnall Gleeson. The same year, he starred in the short thriller film Home, written and directed by John Henry Hinkel. In 2015, he co-starred in the crime film Dixieland, alongside Riley Keough, Chris Zylka, and Faith Hill. The film premiered at the Tribeca Film Festival on April 19, 2015. The film was distributed on December 11, 2015, in a limited release and through video on demand by IFC Films.

In 2016, Lofranco appeared as Mikey in King Cobra, which boasted a star-studded cast that included Christian Slater, Molly Ringwald and James Franco. In 2018, he appeared in Gotti, where he portrayed John Travolta's onscreen son in a biographical movie about New York City-based mob boss John Gotti. According to USA Today, Lofranco's roles in King Cobra and Gotti were his "best known roles" and "signaled his Hollywood ascent." However, these two films would be Lofranco's final films as well.

== Personal life and death ==
On August 6, 2013, while driving his SUV, Lofranco hit actress Camille Banham, who was riding her bike at the time. Lofranco initially stopped his vehicle and apologized, but then returned to his vehicle and drove away without offering help, leaving Banham with a broken hip and other fractures. Lofranco was convicted of misdemeanor hit and run and sentenced to 50 days of community service.

In his final Instagram post on November 11, 2025, Lofranco said "the best is yet to come". Lofranco died seven days later in British Columbia. His death was announced by his brother Santino.

== Filmography ==
Year	Title	Role	Notes
2013	At Middleton	Conrad Hartman	Denver Film Festival Rising Star Award
2014	Jamesy Boy	James Burns	
2014	Unbroken	Harry Brooks	
2015	Home	Mark	Short film
2015	Dixieland	Billy	
2016	King Cobra	Mikey	
2018	Gotti	John Gotti Jr.	
