= Six Years =

6 Years or Six Years may refer to:

- 6 Years, 2015 film
- Six Years, novel by Harlan Coben
- Six years, play by Sharr White 2007
