= A Teacher (miniseries) =

2020 American drama television miniseries

- Promotional poster
- Genre: Drama
- Created by: Hannah Fidell
- Based on: A Teacher by Hannah Fidell
- Directed by: Hannah Fidell; Gillian Robespierre; Andrew Neel
- Starring: Kate Mara; Nick Robinson; Ashley Zukerman; Shane Harper; Marielle Scott; Dylan Schmid; Adam David Thompson; Jana Peck
- Music by: Keegan DeWitt
- Country of origin: United States
- Original language: English
- No. of episodes: 10

Production
- Executive producers: Hannah Fidell; Daniel Brocklehurst; Michael Costigan; Kate Mara; Louise Shore; Jason Bateman
- Cinematography: Quyen Tran
- Editors: Phillip Harrison; Nat Fuller; Kyle Reiter
- Running time: 21–30 minutes
- Production companies: Aggregate Films; Hola Fidel; FXP

Original release
- Network: FX on Hulu
- Release: November 10 – December 29, 2020

A Teacher is an American drama television miniseries created by Hannah Fidell based on her film of the same name. The series stars Kate Mara and Nick Robinson. It is produced by FX and premiered on sister streaming service FX on Hulu on November 10, 2020. Critical reception to the miniseries was generally positive. The characterization of the two leads, performances, pacing, and expansion over the original were largely seen as improvements upon the film, while the ending was generally criticized for its rushed nature.

== Premise ==
Set in the span of 11 years, this series follows a female English teacher in her early 30s as she begins an illicit abusive relationship in the fictional school of Westerbrook High in Austin, Texas.

== Cast and characters ==
=== Main ===
- Kate Mara as Claire Wilson, a high school English teacher in her early 30s who engages in an illicit affair with one of her students
- Nick Robinson as Eric Walker, a popular high school senior whose illicit relationship with his teacher has lifelong implications
- Ashley Zukerman as Matt Mitchell, Claire's husband
- Shane Harper as Logan Davis, one of Eric's best friends
- Marielle Scott as Kathryn Sanders, a French teacher and Claire's newest friend
- Dylan Schmid as Josh Smith, one of Eric's best friends
- Adam David Thompson as Nate Wilson, a local police officer and Claire's older brother
- Jana Peck as Victoria Davis, Logan and Cody's mother who becomes hostile toward Claire once her crime comes to light

=== Recurring ===
- Rya Ingrid Kihlstedt as Sandy Walker, Eric's supportive single mother who works to care for him and his younger brothers
- Cameron Moulène as Cody, a frat member and Logan's older brother
- Camila Perez as Alison Martinez, Eric's ex-girlfriend
- Ciara Quinn Bravo as Mary Smith, Josh's younger sister
- Charlie Zeltzer as Phil Walker, one of Eric's younger brothers
- Matt Raymond as Devin Walker, another of Eric's younger brothers
- M. C. Gainey as Wyatt Wilson, Claire and Nate's formerly alcoholic father
- Devon Bostick as Ryan, Eric's college roommate who tries to help him adjust to life in college

== Episodes ==
No.	Title	Directed by	Written by	Original release date
1	"Episode 1"	Hannah Fidell	Hannah Fidell	November 10, 2020
In 2013, 32-year-old Claire Wilson starts her new job as an AP English teacher at Westerbrook high school in Austin, Texas while also feels stuck in a loveless marriage, however her life takes an unexpected turn when one of her students, popular 17-year-old high-school senior Eric Walker, who’s got a difficult home life begins to seek her help for tutoring for the SATS
2	"Episode 2"	Hannah Fidell	Hannah Fidell	November 10, 2020
While at a party, Eric gets into trouble and turns to Claire for help, which soon deepens their relationship as it sets off a chain of events.
3	"Episode 3"	Hannah Fidell	Andrew Neel	November 10, 2020
Claire, angry at Eric for kissing her, initially refuses to tutor him, but he apologizes and convinces her to continue. While he is hanging out with Logan and Cody, Eric lies about who Claire is, claiming she is a college girl. Eric asks Alison to the school's homecoming dance with him, which she accepts. Matt begins to suggest Claire try in vitro fertilization to start their family, which creates further tension. After Eric skips the tutoring session, Claire confronts him about it at the dance. He says he cannot control himself around her; later, after sharing longing glances, Eric and Claire leave together and have sex in the back of Claire's car.
4	"Episode 4"	Gillian Robespierre	Ruby Rae Spiegel	November 17, 2020
Claire sets ground rules for her and Eric's relationship. Matt notices Claire acting strange, but she allays his suspicions by giving him oral sex. Eric lies to his friends about why he left the dance early and is confronted by an angered Alison. Claire goes out for drinks with her co-worker Kathryn, who notices a hickey on Claire's neck. Claire sends Eric a scandalous photo and, breaking their rules, asks to meet Eric for sex. Eric, who is babysitting his brothers while his mother is on a date, leaves the kids in the care of a neighborhood girl. Eric tells Claire he genuinely cares for her and wants more than just sex, and Claire reciprocates those feelings. Eric returns home to find his mother is home and she reveals his younger brother burned himself while he was gone. Eric psyches himself up in the mirror to justify his behavior.
5	"Episode 5"	Andrew Neel	Rosa Handelman	November 24, 2020
Eric and Claire spend a weekend at a rented ranch house to celebrate Eric's 18th birthday. Eric is upset that Claire expects the relationship to end when Eric goes to college and laments that their relationship has to be secret. They profess their love for each other. Claire goes to a bar where Matt and his band are performing their first show. She and Kathryn drink in the parking lot and Kathryn deduces Claire is having an affair. Initially reluctant to share more, Claire eventually reveals she is having sex with Eric. Despite Claire's attempts to justify their relationship, Kathryn tells Claire she has no choice but to report her and leaves, panicking Claire.
6	"Episode 6"	Gillian Robespierre	Andrew Neel	December 1, 2020
Police detectives arrive at Eric's house to question him and he reveals his relationship with Claire. News of the relationship spreads and Eric's friends react with shock. Claire reveals her affair to Matt, who seeks counsel from Claire's brother, Nate. While heartbroken and angry, Matt declares to Claire his intention to save their marriage. Claire abruptly leaves to meet with Eric, who suggests they run away together; she accepts. At a motel, Claire receives a call from Nate, who says the police may look at the situation as a kidnapping. Claire and Eric have drunken sex but, after seeing missed calls and texts from his friends and his mother, Eric leaves the motel in the early morning. He tearfully reunites with his mother. Awaking to find Eric gone, Claire turns herself in at the police department.
7	"Episode 7"	Andrew Neel	Boo Killebrew	December 8, 2020
A year after her arrest, life for Eric has undergone significant change after the affair was exposed. Eric tries to move on by getting adapted to college life, but finds it hard to move on from Claire.
8	"Episode 8"	Hannah Fidell	Rosa Handelman	December 15, 2020
Released on a strict supervised parole, now divorced , and living with her brother, Claire tries to readjust to society by restarting her life, but it’s proven easier said than done as she finds herself not only ostracized within Austin, but also with her family. While in the midst of everything, she receives a message from the past.
9	"Episode 9"	Hannah Fidell	Boo Killebrew	December 22, 2020
Now living with her dad again, Claire finds herself working for him, while also seeking self punishing ways sexually by using Tinder now that her divorce with Matt is finalized. Meanwhile, life for Eric has spiraled out control as he finds himself on the verge of getting kicked out of college and finds himself more withdrawn with life.
10	"Episode 10"	Hannah Fidell	Hannah Fidell & Dana Kitchens	December 29, 2020
10 years have passed and it’s now 2024, Claire has remarried, has two daughters, and moved to Houston. Now in his late 20s, Eric leads therapeutic wilderness retreats and makes the two-day drive back to Austin for his high school reunion. Eric encounters Claire in a grocery store, leaving them both shaken. At the reunion, Eric meets up with Logan and Josh; he also reunites with Alison and the pair rebuild their damaged relationship by hooking up in her hotel room. Claire texts Eric, asking to meet for lunch. At the restaurant, the conversation is strained and Eric reveals the bitter feelings he now has for Claire, saying he blamed himself for years before realizing that Claire took advantage of him. Claire shows contrition and apologizes multiple times for violating her role as an educator, revealing that people still judge her for what happened, but Eric tells her that she is still not taking responsibility and he will not absolve her guilt, as she wants. He says they both have to live with what happened and then abruptly leaves.

== Production ==
=== Development ===
In February 2014, it was revealed that Fidell's film A Teacher would be adapted for television by HBO. Fidell would write and executive produce the series along with Danny Brocklehurst. Kate Mara who is starring in the series also be serving as an executive producer, while Fidell will also direct the series, set up at FX instead of HBO. Following the completion of the acquisition of 21st Century Fox by Disney in March 2019, The Walt Disney Company became the majority stakeholders of Hulu and with FX becoming one of the assets acquired through the purchase., it was announced in November 2019 that the show would premiere on Hulu instead of FX, as part of FX on Hulu. Keegan DeWitt composed the series score.

=== Casting ===
In August 2018, it was announced Kate Mara and Nick Robinson were cast in lead roles for the series. In September 2019, Ashley Zukerman, Marielle Scott, Shane Harper, and Adam David Thompson joined the cast as series regulars, while Rya Kihlstedt, Camila Perez, Cameron Moulène and Ciara Bravo joined in recurring roles.

=== Filming ===
Principal photography began shooting in Calgary, Alberta, in August 2019 and wrapped on October 13, 2019.

== Release ==
The miniseries premiered on November 10, 2020, with the first three episodes available and the rest debuting on a weekly basis on FX on Hulu. It also premiered on BBC Two in the United Kingdom on January 3, 2021. Internationally, it is available on Disney+ under the dedicated streaming hub Star as an original series since April 23, 2021, and in Latin America, the series premiered on August 31, 2021, on Star+.

== Reception ==
=== Audience viewership ===
According to Whip Media, A Teacher was the top rising show, based on the week-over-week growth in episodes watched for a specific program, during the week of November 15, 2020, and the 6th during the week of April 25, 2021. In January 2021, it was reported that A Teacher became FX on Hulu's most-watched series to date, surpassing Mrs. America and Devs.

=== Critical response ===
Review aggregator Rotten Tomatoes reported an approval rating of 73% based on 33 reviews, with an average rating of 6.2/10. The website's critics consensus reads, "Beautiful, but slight, A Teacher's attempts to unpack its cautionary tale are admirable, even if its approach is too muted to make a meaningful impact." Metacritic gave the miniseries a weighted average score of 67 out of 100 based on 25 reviews, indicating "generally favorable reviews".

Caroline Framke of Variety praised the performances of Kate Mara and Nick Robinson, complimented how the miniseries explores the consequences of the abuse experienced by Robinson's character across his relationship, and wrote, "A Teacher is an intensive, immersive study of how abuse works and the intimate damage it can wreak."

Emily St. James of Vox wrote that Hannah Fidell succeeds to reimagine and expand the central notion of her film across the miniseries in a thoughtful way, and praised the miniseries for portraying the relationship between the lead characters as wrong and abusive, stating it does not shy away from depicting the negative repercussions of Mara's character on Robinson's.

Liz Shannon Miller of Collider gave the miniseries a grade of A−, applauded the performances of Mara and Robinson, and stated the show succeeds to depict the negative consequences of an abusive relationship, writing, "A Teacher is not a love story. It really has nothing to do with love. But those who find themselves in these situations in real life don't know that, something which A Teacher is trying to capture, and ultimately makes it one of the most daring and complex series of 2020."

Matt Cabral of Common Sense Media rated the miniseries four out of five stars and highlighted the strong sexual content and language, writing, "A Teacher is a mature drama series about an illicit, sexual affair between a high school teacher and her student. The show depicts the predator's grooming of her victim, as well as the ensuing relationship and its fallout. [...] The victim is portrayed as a kind, if flawed, individual who values his relationships with his friends and family."

Kristen Baldwin of Entertainment Weekly gave the miniseries a B, praised the performances of the actors, complimented the chemistry between Mara and Robinson, but criticized the ending of the series, writing, "Television is a medium that allows us to live with characters; instead, A Teacher gives us a highlight reel of psychic convalescence, before ending on a note of oversimplified closure."

=== Accolades ===
Year	Award	Category	Recipient(s)	Result	Ref.
2021	Gold Derby Awards	Movie/Limited Series Actress	Kate Mara	Nominated	
2021	Women's Image Network Awards	Outstanding Made For Television Movie / Limited Series	A Teacher	Nominated	
2021	Film Independent Spirit Awards	Best New Scripted Series	Hannah Fidell, Michael Costigan, Kate Mara, Louise Shore, Jason Bateman, Daniel Brocklehurst, Daniel Pipski	Nominated	
2022	BMI Film & TV Awards	BMI Streaming Series Awards	Keegan DeWitt	Won	
