= Jamesy Boy =

- Theatrical release poster
- Directed by: Trevor White
- Written by: Trevor White; Lane Shadgett
- Produced by: Scott Mednick; Wayne L. Rogers; Maria Norman; Steven P. Saeta; Galen Walker; Tim White
- Starring: Spencer Lofranco; Mary-Louise Parker; Ving Rhames; Taissa Farmiga; Michael Trotter; Rosa Salazar; Ben Rosenfield; Jimmy "Taboo" Gomez; James Woods
- Cinematography: Robert Lam
- Edited by: Josh Noyes
- Music by: Jermaine Stegall
- Production companies: Star Thrower Entertainment; Synergics Films; Gama Entertainment Partners
- Distributed by: Phase 4 Films; XLrator Media
- Release date: January 3, 2014
- Running time: 109 minutes
- Country: United States
- Language: English
- Budget: $4 million

Jamesy Boy is a 2014 American biographical crime drama film directed by Trevor White and written by White and Lane Shadgett. The film stars Spencer Lofranco, Mary-Louise Parker, Taissa Farmiga, Ving Rhames, and James Woods. It tells the true story of ex-convict James Burns. The film was released in North America on January 3, 2014 through video on demand, and in a limited theatrical release on January 17, 2014 by Phase 4 Films.

== Plot ==
At age eighteen, James Burns is imprisoned for selling guns and possession of drugs. Three years earlier, his mother, Tracy, attempts to enroll him in school, but he is turned away due to his criminal record and recent stint in a youth detention center. One night, James meets Crystal and Drew after they steal from a convenience store, and befriends them. Crystal tells James about Roc, a gangster they work for, and offers him a chance to meet him. After learning that James is up to no good, Tracy attempts to intervene, but James rebukes her and indicates he has no plans to attend school. James removes his house arrest ankle bracelet and leaves past curfew.

James meets Roc and becomes his getaway driver for an armed robbery. However, Roc and his partner Drew are ambushed and held at gunpoint, but James sneaks inside and saves them. Impressed, Roc accepts James as a member of his crew. Crystal seduces James, who soon also meets Sarah, a timid cashier whose father owns a local convenience store. At a strip club, James and Drew burst into the back office to retrieve owed money for Roc, but it goes awry when they are subdued and beaten by the bouncers. In the parking lot, James breaks into the man's vehicle and steals a duffel bag full of guns. Roc is furious and demands that James fix his mistake. James and Crystal have a fight, and he leaves her.

Meanwhile, James befriends Sarah and begins a relationship with her. He tries to leave Roc's crew, but Roc guilt trips him into selling the guns before he does. James and Drew meet another crew to sell the guns, but the exchange goes wrong, resulting in a shootout. The police arrive while James and Drew escape. James escapes to Sarah's house and tells her to pack so they can leave together, but she refuses. The police arrest James soon after.

In prison, James makes an enemy in Guillermo, who picks on a new inmate, Chris Cesario. Later, Guillermo's gang attempts to shiv James in the shower; during the fight, Chris is stabbed instead. James has nightmares from the incident and takes up poetry in order to block out prison. James attempts to befriend a lifelong inmate named Conrad, but is rebuffed. Concerned for Chris' safety, James asks correctional officer Lieutenant Falton to place Chris in protective custody until his release hearing, but Falton refuses. Guillermo confronts James in the prison yard and attempts to provoke him, but James refuses to fight. Impressed, Conrad offers James advice for bettering himself.

Chris hangs himself in the hallway after getting another six years on his sentence. James attacks Guillermo and accidentally strikes Falton; he is subsequently placed in solitary confinement. Later, James starts a fight in the yard, but Conrad breaks it up and threatens James, demanding he keep calm and await his parole hearing.

At his hearing, James admits regret over Chris' death and his past decisions; he is subsequently released from prison and gets a job as a motel clerk. One night, an old acquaintance comes by and offers him some work, but he turns it down. Arriving at Sarah's convenience store, he finds it boarded up. He goes to Sarah's house, but her father says she has moved out. He finds her at a new house that she shares with her fiancé. At Sarah's request, he recites some of his poetry for her. James continues working and saves money in an envelope labeled "New York City".

== Cast ==
- Spencer Lofranco as James Burns
- Mary-Louise Parker as Tracy Burns
- Taissa Farmiga as Sarah
- Ving Rhames as Conrad
- James Woods as Lt. Mark Falton
- Rosa Salazar as Crystal
- Michael Trotter as Roc
- Ben Rosenfield as Chris Cesario
- Jaime "Taboo" Gomez as Guillermo
- Keon Clayton as Drew
- Kellyn Rogers as Holly Burns
- Robert F. Chew as Fat Ass Manager

== Production ==
=== Development ===
The film marked the directorial debut of Trevor White, who co-wrote the screenplay with Lane Shadgett. The story is based on the real-life journey of James Burns, who turned his life around after being released from prison. Maria Norman, Wayne Rogers, Scott Mednick, Steven P. Saeta, Galen Walker and Tim White produced the film with Star Thrower Entertainment, Synergics Films and Gama Entertainment Partners. The real James Burns also acted as a co-producer for the film.

=== Casting ===
In February 2012, it was reported that James Woods, Ving Rhames and Mary-Louise Parker had joined the cast of the film, and that Spencer Lofranco would be taking on the lead role of James Burns. In March 2012, Taissa Farmiga joined the cast in the supporting role of Sarah, James' love interest. The casting of Taboo in the supporting role of Guillermo was reported in late March 2012, while the film was in production.

=== Filming ===
Principal photography for the film took place in Baltimore, Maryland on an estimated budget of $5 million. Filming began on March 5, 2012 and lasted approximately five weeks. In late March, filming took place in Jessup, Maryland. Shooting also took place in the Baltimore neighborhood of Curtis Bay, at the Maryland House of Correction, and in Brooklyn. Production wrapped on April 4, 2012.

== Release ==
In May 2013, it was announced that Phase 4 Films had acquired the North American distribution rights to the film. The film was released on all video on demand platforms on January 3, 2014 before a limited release on January 17, 2014. Jamesy Boy was released on Blu-ray in the United States on March 11, 2014, and on DVD on March 18, 2014.

== Reception ==
The film received generally negative reviews from film critics. Review aggregator website Rotten Tomatoes reported a 26% approval rating, based on 19 reviews, with a weighted average of 5.05/10. On Metacritic, the film garnered an approval score of 29 out of 100, based on 6 reviews, indicating "generally unfavorable" reviews.

Martin Tsai of the Los Angeles Times wrote, "The core of Jamesy Boy – a juvenile delinquent's inside-the-pen coming of age – follows a too-familiar trajectory: Due to the toxic mix of broken family and corruptive friends, James Burns (Spencer Lofranco) has already earned a tracking device on his ankle and an impressive rap sheet boasting robbery, vandalism, assault and firearm possession." David Hiltbrand of The Philadelphia Inquirer gave the film 2.5 stars out of 4, writing, "For an independent film, Jamesy Boy has a distinguished cast, including Ving Rhames, Mary-Louise Parker, and James Woods. But it's an unknown, Spencer Lofranco, who makes this gritty chronicle, based on a true story, so memorable ... For such a seriously street film, Jamesy Boy has some surprisingly sappy moments. But the redemptive ending, while thin, is genuinely gratifying." The Hollywood Reporter critic John DeFore wrote, "A true story of a young con who turned his life around, Trevor White's Jamesy Boy wants very much to be inspirational. But nothing the first-time helmer tries – not casting big names in small parts, not scrambling the timeline, not casting a newcomer (Spencer Lofranco) whose swept-back coif recalls James Dean (even if nothing else about him does) – can keep the tale from feeling like one cribbed from a score of other second-chance films. Commercial prospects are dim despite the marquee-worthy supporting cast."
