= Dixieland (film) =

- Theatrical release poster
- Directed by: Hank Bedford
- Written by: Hank Bedford
- Produced by: Jen Gatien
- Starring: Chris Zylka; Riley Keough; Spencer Lofranco; Steve Earle; Faith Hill
- Cinematography: Tobias Datum
- Edited by: David Massachi
- Music by: West Dylan Thordson
- Production companies: Deerjen Films; Graham Avenue Productions
- Distributed by: IFC Films
- Release dates: April 19, 2015 (Tribeca Film Festival); December 11, 2015 (United States)
- Running time: 92 minutes
- Country: United States
- Language: English

Dixieland is a 2015 American crime drama film, written and directed by Hank Bedford. The film stars Chris Zylka, Riley Keough, Spencer Lofranco, Steve Earle, and Faith Hill. The film had its world premiere at the Tribeca Film Festival on April 19, 2015. The film was released in a limited release and through video on demand on December 11, 2015, by IFC Films.

== Plot ==
Fresh out of prison, Kermit, a good hearted kid who got in trouble with some drug dealers, returns home to his Mississippi trailer park. As Kermit struggles to keep clean, he falls for Rachel, his neighbor who’s turned to dancing in a strip club to support her sick mother. Kermit and Rachel make a desperate effort to escape their dead-end town.

== Cast ==
- Chris Zylka as Kermit
  - John Clofine as Young Kermit
- Riley Keough as Rachel
- Spencer Lofranco as Billy
- Steve Earle as Uncle Randy
- Faith Hill as Arletta
- RJ Mitte as CJ
- Brad Carter as Larry Pretty
- Pedro Anaya Perez as Flavor
- Davis Cannada as Clay
- Sergio Figueroa as Jorge
- Carl Frischer as Jc
- Shy Pilgreen as Mercedes
- Mick Foley as himself

== Production ==
On November 5, 2014, it was announced Faith Hill, Chris Zylka, Riley Keough, RJ Mitte, Spencer Lofranco, Brad Carter, and Steve Earle had all been cast in the film.

== Reception ==
=== Release ===
The film had its world premiere at the Tribeca Film Festival on April 19, 2015. Shortly after it was announced IFC Films had acquired distribution rights to the film. The film was released in a limited release and through video on demand on December 11, 2015.

=== Critical response ===
On Rotten Tomatoes, it has a rating of 20%.
