= Due West (film) =

American action drama film

- Directed by: Evan Miller
- Screenplay by: Evan Miller; Hardy Janson
- Produced by: Adrianne Palicki; Ezra Venetos; Beau Harris; Caitlin McFarland; Emily Gipson
- Starring: Adrianne Palicki; Henry Thomas; Ciara Bravo; Matt Lauria; Odette Annable
- Cinematography: Jonathan Nicholas
- Edited by: Sandra Adair
- Music by: Travis Howard
- Production company: No Mondays Productions
- Distributed by: Cineverse; Fandor
- Release dates: April 26, 2025 (Dallas International Film Festival); July 24, 2026 (United States, limited); July 28, 2026 (Fandor)
- Running time: 81 minutes
- Country: United States
- Language: English

Due West is a 2025 American independent drama film starring Adrianne Palicki, Henry Thomas, Ciara Bravo, Matt Lauria, and Odette Annable. It is co-written by Evan Miller and Hardy Janson, with Miller as director.

== Premise ==
A West Texan woman seeks help in procuring a medical abortion which is illegal in the state. She faces challenges in the process and assistance from unlikely sources

== Cast ==
- Adrianne Palicki as The Woman
- Henry Thomas as Pastor Mike
- Ciara Bravo as Haley
- Matt Lauria as Cody
- Odette Annable as Mindy
- Joey Oglesby as The Man
- Austin Nichols as Billy

== Production ==
The film is co-written by Evan Miller and Hardy Janson, and is directed by Miller in his feature length directorial debut. The film is produced by Ezra Venetos, Beau Harris, Caitlin McFarland, Emily Gipson and Adrianne Palicki. Miller and Henry Thomas are co-producers. Miller and Palicki previously worked together on the 2023 short film Thoughts and Prayers.

Palicki and Thomas lead the cast, which also includes Ciara Bravo, Matt Lauria, Odette Annable, Austin Nichols and Joey Oglesby.

Filming locations included Alpine, Texas in February 2024.

== Release ==
The film premiered at the 2025 Dallas International Film Festival in April 2025.

It was given a limited theatrical release in the United States by Cineverse on July 24, 2026, before being released on its Fandor streaming platform on July 28.

== Reception ==
The film won Best Feature Film at the Burbank International Film Festival and the El Paso Film Festival.
