= Affluenza (film) =

- Theatrical release poster
- Directed by: Kevin Asch
- Screenplay by: Antonio Macia
- Story by: Kevin Asch; Antonio Macia
- Produced by: Morris S. Levy
- Starring: Ben Rosenfield; Gregg Sulkin; Grant Gustin; Nicola Peltz
- Cinematography: Timothy Gillis
- Edited by: Suzanne Spangler
- Music by: MJ Mynarski
- Production companies: Lookbook Films; Mega Films
- Distributed by: Filmbuff
- Release dates: July 9, 2014 (SVA Theater); July 11, 2014 (United States)
- Running time: 84 minutes
- Country: United States
- Language: English

Affluenza is a 2014 American drama film directed by Kevin Asch and written by Antonio Macia. It is loosely based on The Great Gatsby by F. Scott Fitzgerald. The first leading role for Ben Rosenfield, it also stars Gregg Sulkin, Nicola Peltz and Grant Gustin.

== Plot ==
In 2008, Fisher Miller (Ben Rosenfield), a young photography student, has a meeting with a wealthy businessman Mr. Carson (Roger Rees) to help him get into art school, only to be told his work reflects the decline of a generation rather than its future hope, Carson laments this as he declares his generation are going out of business in a "fire sale".

It then flashes back a month before the financial crash as Fisher moves in with his aunt Bunny and uncle Philip (Samantha Mathis and Steve Guttenberg) in Great Neck, New York, to escape his middle-class life for the mansions of the young, beautiful elite of Long Island's moneyed class. With a stash of high-quality marijuana and a vintage camera, he gains access to his cousin Kate's (Nicola Peltz) circle of wealthy and indulged friends.

Fisher befriends the stepson of the community's richest resident, Dylan Carson (Gregg Sulkin), an insecure outsider in his own world who uses his money in an attempt to gain the acceptance he craves. Central to his pursuit is the love of his former flame Kate, now dating the preppy Todd (Grant Gustin). Through Fisher's help, Dylan attempts to regain Kate's affection only for the triangle to come crashing down, just as the financial system around them, with devastating consequences for all those involved.

== Cast ==
- Ben Rosenfield as Fisher Miller
- Gregg Sulkin as Dylan Carson
- Nicola Peltz as Kate Miller
- Grant Gustin as Todd Goodman
- Steve Guttenberg as Philip Miller
- Samantha Mathis as Bunny Miller
- Valentina de Angelis as Jody
- Danny Burstein as Ira Miller
- Adriane Lenox as Professor Walker
- Roger Rees as Mr. Carson
- Patrick Page as Jack Goodman
- Carla Quevedo as Gail
- John Rothman as Rabbi Cohen
- Kevin Asch as Picha Photographer
- Joe Cross as Shamanalarana
- Taylor Gildersleeve as Beth
- Barry Rohrssen as Detective

== Production ==
In July 2012, The Hollywood Reporter announced that Grant Gustin had landed the lead role. The main role eventually went to Ben Rosenfield, with Gustin taking a supporting role. Gregg Sulkin was later cast as the film's Jay Gatsby character Dylan and Nicola Peltz was cast as Rosenfield's cousin, completing the main cast.

== Release ==
The film premiered at the SVA Theater in New York City on July 9, 2014, and was released in the United States on July 11, 2014 in a limited release and through video on demand.

== Reception ==
Review aggregator website Rotten Tomatoes reported that 23% of thirteen surveyed critics gave the film a positive review; the average rating was 3.5/10. Metacritic rated it 30 out of 100 based on twelve reviews. Andrew Barker of Variety described it as "an empty recasting of The Great Gatsby among Long Island rich kids." Frank Scheck of The Hollywood Reporter wrote that the film "attempts to tackle weighty themes but ultimately feels as shallow as the lives of most of its principal characters." Ben Kenigsberg of The New York Times called it a "millennial-chiding takeoff on The Great Gatsby" whose "vapid moralizing owes more to Bret Easton Ellis than to F. Scott Fitzgerald."
