= At Middleton =

- Theatrical release poster
- Directed by: Adam Rodgers
- Screenplay by: Glenn German; Adam Rodgers
- Produced by: Andy García; Glenn German; Sig Libowitz
- Starring: Andy García; Vera Farmiga; Taissa Farmiga; Spencer Lofranco; Peter Riegert; Tom Skerritt
- Cinematography: Emmanuel Kadosh
- Edited by: Suzy Elmiger
- Music by: Arturo Sandoval
- Production companies: CineSon Entertainment; Look at the Moon Productions; North by Northwest Entertainment
- Distributed by: Anchor Bay Films
- Release dates: May 17, 2013 (Seattle); January 31, 2014 (United States)
- Running time: 99 minutes
- Country: United States
- Language: English
- Budget: $2.5 million
- Box office: $82,993

At Middleton is a 2013 American romantic comedy film directed by Adam Rodgers and starring Andy García, Vera Farmiga, Taissa Farmiga, and Spencer Lofranco in his film debut. Written by Glenn German and Adam Rodgers, the film follows a man and a woman as they meet and fall in love while taking their children on a college tour. The film had its world premiere at the Seattle International Film Festival on May 17, 2013. It was released in a limited release and through video on demand on January 31, 2014 by Anchor Bay Films.

== Plot ==
Edith Martin and her highly strung daughter Audrey, and George Hartman and his unmotivated son Conrad, arrive for a campus tour of the quaint Middleton College led by junior "Dingleberry" Justin. When Edith and George wander off, the two bond as they try to reunite with the tour. When they meet the group in the library, Edith and George embarrass their children.

Audrey accuses Edith of not supporting her decision to go to Middleton, and as revenge, Edith lies and says that she and George are taking an exclusive tour of the campus with the university's Dean. Audrey and Conrad are then left alone with the rest of the "cookie cutter" tour, while Edith and George play hooky. The two borrow some bikes to explore the campus. They climb to the top of the bell tower and sneak into an acting class. During an acting exercise, the two emotionally connect.

Meanwhile, Audrey tells Conrad that she wants to attend Middleton because she can be mentored by Middleton's acclaimed professor, Roland Emerson. Conrad says he's keeping his options open. At lunch, Audrey calls the Dean's assistant and finds out that Edith was lying about the exclusive tour. She then bumps into George and demands to know where her mother is. He tells her that Edith went to the observatory when she was really having lunch with George in the cafeteria. Edith and George discuss their relationship, unsure of what it is since they are both married.

Audrey and Conrad go to the observatory, finding it locked. In her anger, Audrey insults Conrad, saying he's peaked in life and it's all downhill for him; Conrad walks off. George and Edith then meet film student Daphne, who offers George her computer so he can help out a heart patient. Edith and George then get high on marijuana with Daphne and her boyfriend Travis and discuss their relationships with their children.

Audrey and Conrad go to their respective meetings with professors. Audrey has tea with Emerson, while Conrad meets Boneyard Sims, who runs the campus radio station. Audrey finds out that Emerson is going on a sabbatical, meaning he won't be able to be her advisor should she attend Middleton. Audrey reacts angrily, and Emerson warns her that she might've crossed the line from ambition into obsession. Conrad realizes his interest is in radio.

Edith and George go back to the bell tower, where they spend an intimate moment. Conrad apologizes to Audrey for her bad day, and informs her that he could see himself going to Middleton; Audrey tells him she no longer wants to go there. As Edith and George head back to their cars, they emotionally part ways. The two then embrace their children and drive off. Edith tells Audrey that they're going to be okay, and George requests Conrad take the long way home.

== Cast ==
- Andy García as George Hartman
- Vera Farmiga as Edith Martin
- Taissa Farmiga as Audrey Martin
- Spencer Lofranco as Conrad Hartman
- Peter Riegert as Boneyard Sims
- Tom Skerritt as Roland Emerson
- Nicholas Braun as Justin "Dingleberry"
- Daniella García as Daphne
- Stephen Borrello as Travis
- Mirjana Joković as Professor Riley

== Production ==
=== Development ===
The film was directed by Adam Rodgers, and co-written by Rodgers and Glenn German. It was produced by German, Andy García (who also stars in the film), and Sig Libowitz, via the production companies Look at the Moon Productions, CineSon Entertainment, and North by Northwest Entertainment.

=== Casting ===
In April 2012, it was reported that Vera Farmiga and Andy García had been cast in the film as Edith Martin and George Hartman, respectively. In June 2012, it was announced that Taissa Farmiga, Spencer Lofranco, and Nicholas Braun had been cast in the film, portraying Audrey Martin, Conrad Hartman, and Justin the admissions tour guide, respectively.

=== Filming ===
Principal photography for the film took place in Washington state, on the campuses of Gonzaga University in Spokane and Washington State University in Pullman, Washington, with a budget of $2.5 million. The film was originally set to shoot in May 2012 at the University of Mississippi in Oxford, but the shoot was pushed back and relocated to the Pacific Northwest. Filming began on July 16, 2012 and lasted four weeks.

== Soundtrack ==
At Middleton (Original Score)

Soundtrack album by Arturo Sandoval
- Released: September 9, 2014
- Genre: Score
- Length: 41:55
- Label: Perseverance

At Middleton: Original Motion Picture Soundtrack was released in the United States on September 9, 2014, by Perseverance Records in digital download and physical formats. The album was then released in the United Kingdom on October 27, 2014, in digital download and CD formats. It includes the original score composed and performed by ten-time Grammy Award-winning jazz trumpeter Arturo Sandoval and "There Was a Day", which was written and performed by Sandoval and Andy García. The album was one of 114 scores in contention for a nomination at the 2014 Academy Awards ceremony (for the Academy Award for Best Original Score), but lost out on a nomination.

=== Track listing ===
All tracks are written by Arturo Sandoval except where noted.

No.	Title	Length
1.	"Fanfare for a Son"	1:02
2.	"George's Cellphone"	0:47
3.	"A Slice of Heaven"	1:18
4.	"Library Mezzanine"	1:30
5.	"Bicycling"	1:09
6.	"Up to the Belltower"	0:57
7.	"Acrophobic George"	1:58
8.	"Bench Observers"	3:22
9.	"Chopsticks"	1:13
10.	"Campus Cops"	1:12
11.	"Lakeside Bench"	1:47
12.	"Don't Want This Day to End"	1:11
13.	"Edith and George Depart"	2:39
14.	"Dorm Source #1 (Arturo's Reggae)"	1:20
15.	"To the Belltower"	1:57
16.	"Not Yet"	1:27
17.	"Goodbyes"	3:07
18.	"End Credits"	5:12
19.	"There Was a Day" (Sandoval, Andy García)	4:25
20.	"There Was a Day (Instrumental)" (Sandoval, García)	4:22

- Songs that are in the film but not the soundtrack include, "Otto Wood" by Snatches of Pink, "Musical Chairs" by Rumspringa, "Fanfare for the Common Man" by Aaron Copland, "The Quiet Crowd" by Patrick Watson, and "The Great Divide" by The Mowgli's. Andy García and Vera Farmiga performed the piano piece "Chopsticks" in the film but were uncredited.
- All track titles, writing credits, and performance credits courtesy of AllMusic.

== Distribution ==
=== Release ===
In May 2012, Anchor Bay Films pre-bought U.S distribution rights to the film. The film had its world premiere at the Seattle International Film Festival on May 17, 2013, and subsequently screened at festivals including Woodstock Film Festival, Boston Film Festival, and the Mill Valley Film Festival. It was released in a limited release on January 31, 2014 in the United States.

=== Home media ===
The film was released onto DVD & Blu-ray on April 1, 2014. As of May 2016, the film has made an additional $385,952 via DVD sales and $31,549 via Blu-ray sales, for a total of $417,501.

== Reception ==
=== Box office ===
The film was given a limited release in the United States through Anchor Bay Films, opening in a maximum of 20 theaters. It made $33,768 in its opening weekend for a per-theater average of $1,688. The film went on to make a further $20,069 for a total domestic gross of $53,837 and made $29,156 in Spain.

=== Critical response ===
The film received a mixed reception from film critics. Review aggregator website Rotten Tomatoes gave the film a 61% approval rating, based on 38 reviews, with a weighted average of 5.9/10. Metacritic gave the film a score of 60 out of 100, based on 15 reviews, indicating "mixed or average" reviews.

Susan Wloszczyna of RogerEbert.com wrote, "At Middleton is just the sort of trite if inoffensive diversion that barely tiptoes into theaters before landing in the cable and video on-demand listings. And Garcia and Farmiga, as good as they can be in the right roles, aren't doing themselves or their careers any favors with this sort of C-level effort. At least the ending is brazen enough not to conclude in a tidy fashion. But watching George and Edith cavort in slo-mo while being drenched in a campus fountain is the antithesis of enjoying Annie Hall and Alvy Singer as those classic polar opposites engage in battle against a runaway lobster. One scene has a comic snap. The other is merely soggy." Vulture critic Bilge Ebiri gave a positive review, stating, "At Middleton is a modest movie with modest aims, but at times it feels like a small miracle. A daylong romance starring Andy García and Vera Farmiga as two parents who meet cute while their kids tour the same small college, it takes a relatively undistinguished premise and sets itself apart with details that ring true. It's all fairly predictable enough."

Neil Genzlinger of The New York Times gave the film a positive review, writing, "Some advance publicity is describing At Middleton as a romantic comedy, but that is too simplistic a label for this delicate, restrained movie. Yes, it's full of droll humor, but it's also a bittersweet portrait of two people, who, in the process of helping their children choose a college, confront the emptiness of their respective marriages." Betsy Sharkey of the Los Angeles Times gave the film a lukewarm review, "Garcia and Farmiga have such an easy, natural chemistry that their on-screen sparkle helps mitigate the film's weaknesses. At other times, it serves to underscore what might have been. It's a feckless conundrum. Edith (Farmiga) is a free-spirited mom. Audrey is her serious, literary-minded daughter, nicely played by Farmiga's real-life sister Taissa, who shares Vera's luminous presence on screen. George (Garcia) is a cardiac surgeon, nattily uptight in his crisp white shirt and bow tie. He's with his reluctant son Conrad (Spencer Lofranco)... Together, Garcia and Farmiga are a sweetheart couple whose mild flirtation makes the time spent At Middleton bearable. With a stronger script, it might have turned into a beautiful day."

=== Accolades ===
Year	Award	Category	Recipient(s)	Result
2013	Boston Film Festival	Festival Prize – Best Actor	Andy García	Won
2013	Boston Film Festival	Festival Prize – Best Actress	Vera Farmiga	Won
2013	Denver Film Festival	Festival Prize – Rising Star	Spencer Lofranco	Won
2013	Montreal World Film Festival	Golden Zenith for Best First Fiction Feature Film	Adam Rodgers	Nominated
