= 6 Years =

- Official poster
- Directed by: Hannah Fidell
- Written by: Hannah Fidell
- Produced by: Kelly Williams; Jonathan Duffy; Andrew Logan
- Starring: Taissa Farmiga; Ben Rosenfield; Lindsay Burdge; Joshua Leonard; Peter Vack; Dana Wheeler-Nicholson
- Cinematography: Andrew Droz Palermo
- Edited by: Sofi Marshall; Carlos Marques-Marcet
- Music by: Julian Wass
- Production companies: Arts+Labor; Duplass Brothers Productions
- Distributed by: The Orchard
- Release dates: March 14, 2015 (SXSW); August 18, 2015 (United States)
- Running time: 79 minutes
- Country: United States
- Language: English

6 Years is a 2015 American romantic drama film written and directed by Hannah Fidell and starring Taissa Farmiga, Ben Rosenfield, Lindsay Burdge, Joshua Leonard, Peter Vack, and Dana Wheeler-Nicholson. Filmmakers Mark and Jay Duplass served as executive producers under their Duplass Brothers Productions banner. The film depicts two weeks in the relationship of college students Melanie Clark and Dan Mercer, as their 6-year romance turns violent.

The film had its world premiere at the South by Southwest Film Festival on March 14, 2015, and its European premiere at the Champs-Élysées Film Festival on June 13, 2015. 6 Years was released on video on demand platforms on August 18, 2015, by The Orchard, and was made available worldwide on Netflix on September 8, 2015.

== Plot ==
A young couple, Melanie Clark and Daniel Mercer, experience joyful moments in their relationship, including having passionate sex. After a house party one night, Mel drives to Dan's house drunk. Berating her for being reckless, Dan tries to force Mel to stay the night. Mel reacts angrily and pushes him into a dresser, causing Dan to sustain a head wound. At the emergency room, Dan lies about how he got the injury, covering for Mel.

Dan interns at Austin-based record label Topo Records. His co-worker Amanda notices his injury; she points out how different the situation would look if it had happened to Mel and not him. Mel starts a job as a teaching assistant to Ms. Anders at an elementary school. One night, her friends ask how she and Dan keep things fresh, and Jessica suggests they should watch pornography. Dan later catches Mel watching a porn film.

The next day, they go for lunch with Dan's mother Joanne. Before Mel arrives, Joanne tells Dan that she and his dad will pay his rent if he chooses to move to New York City. A few nights later, Mel and Dan go to a pool party thrown by Mark. After Mel leaves, Dan kisses Amanda on an impulse. He apologizes, and they agree it is best to stay friends.

The next morning, Dan goes to Mel's house and she notices his odd behavior. He denies there's anything wrong. That night, Mel borrows Dan's phone at a party and sees a text from Amanda talking about their kiss. They break out into a physical fight, and, in an attempt to subdue Mel's lashing out, Dan holds her to the ground. The police show up and misunderstand the situation because Mel stays silent when Dan asks her to explain the situation to them. When she refuses to do so, the police arrest him. Dan is released the next morning, but refuses to speak to Mel.

Jason and Mark offer Dan a job at Topo Records' new office in Brooklyn. To celebrate, he goes to a bar with Amanda. She apologizes for sending him the text, and Dan informs her that he and Mel are on a break. Meanwhile, Mel attends a party with her friends, where she meets Will. After becoming intoxicated, Jessica and Will take her home. Jessica goes back to the party, but Will stays behind and attempts to rape Mel while she is semiconscious; she pushes him off and he leaves.

Mel tells Dan about Will and tearfully asks him to hold her. The two then go to Houston to help Mel's mother move out of her childhood home. While there, Dan visits his mom, who encourages him to go to New York. Later, Dan tells Mel about his job offer and she accuses him of only thinking of himself. He, in turn, calls her needy and Mel orders him to leave. Mel then worries that she has messed the relationship up for good. Her roommate Becca suggests that she should sleep on it and give Dan time to cool off.

Back at Dan's house, he and Amanda have sex. The next morning, Mel arrives to apologize and catches Amanda leaving. In the ensuing argument, Mel throws a glass across the room and Dan throws a punch at her, but diverts in the end thinking better of it, causing him to slam his hand into the wall. She pushes Dan into the broken shards, injuring his foot. At the hospital, Dan tells Mel he's sorry and that he no longer wants to go to New York and wants to stay with her. Mel tells Dan that she thinks he should take the job and move to New York. Dan rejects that suggestion and says he wants to stay. Mel tells Dan that she loves him but it doesn't feel right. Dan tells Mel that he doesn't want to break up but she then asks Dan to look her in the eyes and tell her that he loves her and wants to spend the rest of his life with her. Dan is unable to and instead says he's sorry. Mel says okay and with that, reality starts to set in that their 6 year relationship is finished.

== Cast ==
- Taissa Farmiga as Melanie "Mel" Clark
- Ben Rosenfield as Daniel "Dan" Mercer
- Lindsay Burdge as Amanda
- Joshua Leonard as Mark
- Dana Wheeler-Nicholson as Joanne Mercer
- Peter Vack as Will
- Jennifer Lafleur as Ms. Anders
- Molly McMichael as Jessica
- Alysia Lucas as Becca
- Jason Newman as Jason

== Production ==
=== Pre-production ===
In June 2014, The Hollywood Reporter announced that Hannah Fidell had written and directed a relationship drama film, set for release in 2015. The feature was produced by Kelly Williams, Andrew Logan and Jonathan Duffy, and executive produced by Mark and Jay Duplass through their production company Duplass Brothers Productions. Fidell had been approached by Mark Duplass to make a film depicting a young couple experiencing domestic violence, which appealed to her. On June 12, 2014, after filming for the project was already complete, it was revealed that Taissa Farmiga and Ben Rosenfield play the leading roles, Melanie Clark and Dan Mercer, respectively. That same day, it was also reported that Peter Vack, Joshua Leonard, Jennifer Lafleur, and Lindsay Burdge have supporting roles in the film. Before filming began, Fidell and the two main actors (Farmiga and Rosenfield) went to the Berkshires in Massachusetts to study the script outline and develop their characters. The film was untitled during pre-production and filming; its official title, 6 Years, was announced by Fidell through her Tumblr blog on September 3, 2014. Will Brittain was originally attached to portray the role of Will, but had to drop out at the last minute.

=== Filming ===
Principal photography for the film lasted approximately three weeks in Austin, Texas. Production began on March 17, 2014, and was completed on April 6, 2014. Filming took place at locations including the West Campus neighborhood, the University of Texas at Austin, and Wooten Elementary School. In July 2014, re-shoots on the film took place. Fidell revealed that she only wrote a 40-page treatment for the film, including visuals and tonal references, instead of writing a full script. In addition, only a few prominent scenes were written with dialogue already prepared for the actors; in other scenes, improvisation was heavily used. Farmiga stated that, for the duration of production, the cast and crew lived together in the house used for Mel's home in the film, in order to become comfortable with each other due to the intimate nature of the film.

=== Post-production ===
Film editing began while the project was still in the production phase, with Sofi Marshall and Carlos Marques-Marcet serving as editors. Fidell stated that the editing process was difficult due to the frequent use of improvisation throughout the film, which made it hard for continuity in the story. Stuck On On provided sound post-production services. In January 2015, Fidell revealed on her Twitter that sound mixing was underway, and at South by Southwest, Fidell stated that post-production had been completed a few weeks before the film's premiere at the festival.

== Soundtrack ==
The soundtrack was set to be made available at some point by The Orchard, but went unreleased. Actors Joshua Leonard, Ben Rosenfield, and Jason Newman recorded a cover of the song "Get Me" by J Mascis (of Dinosaur Jr.) for the soundtrack; Rosenfield and Lindsay Burdge also recorded a cover of "Indian Summer" by Beat Happening.

Julian Wass was hired to score the music for the film, having previously composed the music for The Do-Deca-Pentathlon (2012), which was written and directed by 6 Years executive producers Mark and Jay Duplass.

No.	Title	Performer(s)	Length
1.	"Glazin'"	Jacuzzi Boys	3:23
2.	"Fame"	Shrines	5:03
3.	"Avalanche"	Gardens & Villa	4:33
4.	"Drive (Los Angeles)"	Lolawolf	3:53
5.	"How Can You Really"	Foxygen	3:33
6.	"The Reflection of You (Lovelock Remix)"	Bear in Heaven	4:19
7.	"Pulsing"	Tomas Barfod (feat. Nina K)	3:26
8.	"I'll Always Wonder"	Eastern Midwestern	3:10
9.	"Take Me"	Kingdom (feat. Naomi Allen)	3:59
10.	"Turn to Sand"	Musique Le Pop	3:46
11.	"Get Me"	Joshua Leonard, Ben Rosenfield & Jason Newman	2:59
12.	"Indian Summer"	Lindsay Burdge & Ben Rosenfield	3:05
13.	"I Went to the Hospital"	Cass McCombs	5:14
14.	"Impregnable Question"	Dirty Projectors	2:43

== Distribution ==
=== Marketing ===
The official poster art for 6 Years was released by the IMDb on July 24, 2015. The official trailer was released exclusively by Yahoo! Movies on July 30, 2015. On August 17, 2015, Vulture.com released the first seven minutes of the film.

=== Release ===
The film had its world premiere on March 14, 2015 at South by Southwest Film Festival. On March 15, 2015, Netflix acquired global distribution rights, with plans that have been accomplished to release it on the streaming service later in that year. The film subsequently screened at the Maryland Film Festival and the 2015 Champs-Élysées Film Festival. In the late June 2015, The Orchard acquired the domestic rights to 6 Years, and released it on video on demand in the United States on August 18, 2015. The film began streaming worldwide through Netflix on September 8, 2015.

=== Home media ===
The film was released on DVD in the United States on April 12, 2016 by Sony Pictures Home Entertainment.

== Reception ==
=== Critical response ===
Review aggregator Rotten Tomatoes gives the film a 69% approval rating based on 13 reviews, and an average rating of 6.61/10. The film was assigned a weighted average of 53 out of 100 from Metacritic, based on 5 reviews, indicating "mixed or average" reviews.

Eric Kohn and Nigel M. Smith of IndieWire cited the performances of Farmiga and Rosenfield as breakout talent at the 2015 South by Southwest. Kohn wrote, "Hannah Fidell, working with executive producers Mark and Jay Duplass, effectively broadens her range by borrowing the sibling directors' improvisatory style and ceding control to her two leads, whose heartbreaking performances imbue this familiar Austin-set narrative with a fiery edge." In their list of 25 performances they would like to see receive awards recognition, IndieWire highlighted Farmiga and Rosenfield's work in 6 Years. IndieWire also listed the film as number 7 on its "13 Most Criminally Overlooked Indies and Foreign Films of 2015".

Justin Chang of Variety wrote, "Although shot and performed in a determinedly raw, naturalistic register, this emotionally roiling portrait of two twentysomething Texas sweethearts too often veers toward melodramatic overstatement, inspiring little empathy or understanding despite the committed performances of promising young leads Taissa Farmiga and Ben Rosenfield." John DeFore of The Hollywood Reporter wrote, "A melodrama benefitting from excellent performances but suffering from a too-obvious script," while Ryland Aldrich of Twitch Film opined, "An indie drama through and through, Fidell has again succeeded in telling a tiny story and making it feel as big as the world. Her connection to these characters is infectious and impossible to ignore. It may be an emotional rollercoaster, but it is real, and the intimacy is undeniable."

=== Accolades ===
Year	Award	Category	Recipient(s)	Result
2015	South by Southwest Film Festival	Grand Jury Award for Narrative Feature	6 Years	Nominated
2015	Champs-Élysées Film Festival	Audience Award for Best American Feature Film	6 Years	Nominated
2015	Houston Film Critics Society	Texas Independent Film Award	6 Years	Nominated
