= Lindsay Burdge =

American actress and producer

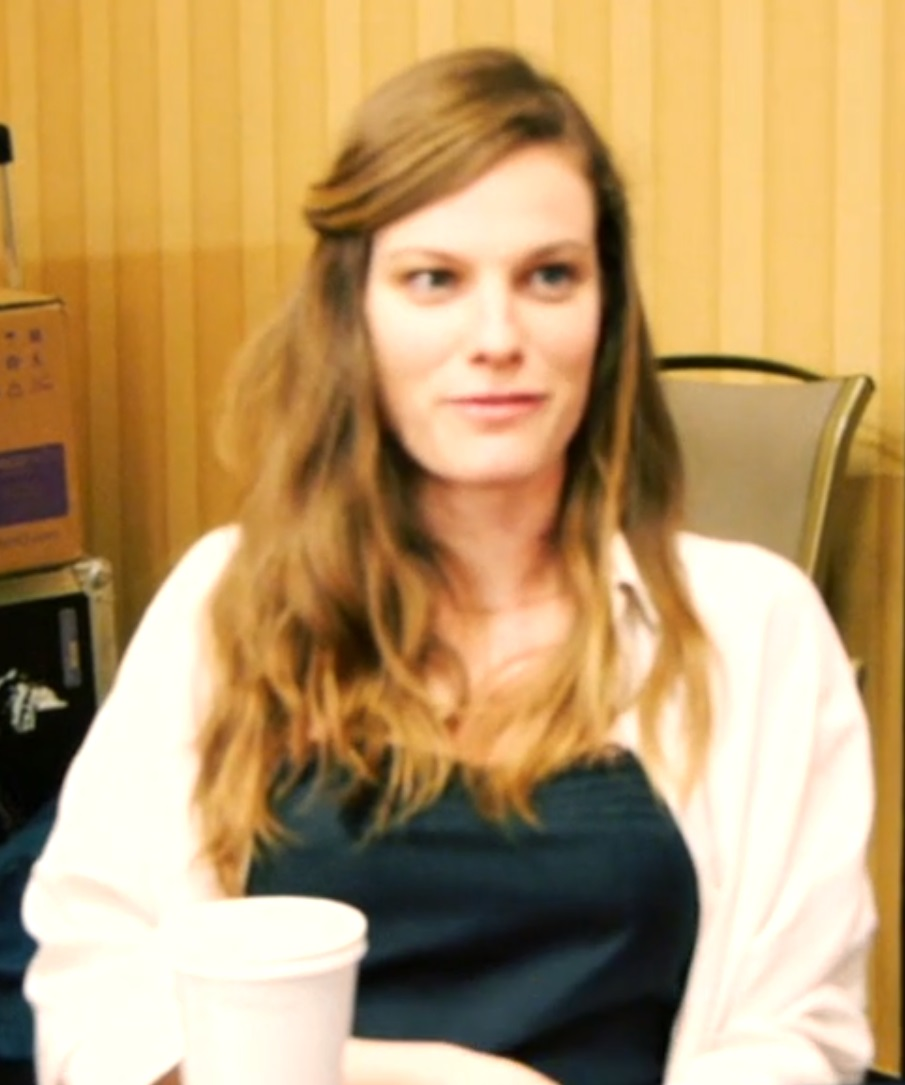
- Burdge interviewed at SXSW in 2013
- Born: Lindsay Michelle Burdge; July 27, 1984 (age 41); Pasadena, California, U.S.
- Occupations: Actress; producer
- Years active: 2008–present

Lindsay Michelle Burdge (born July 27, 1984) is an American actress and producer known for her roles in independent films such as A Teacher (2013), Wild Canaries (2014), The Midnight Swim (2014), The Invitation (2015), 6 Years (2015), and Thirst Street (2017).

== Life and career ==
Burdge was born in Pasadena, California. She attended New York University. In 2013, she had her breakthrough role as Diana Watts in Hannah Fidell's drama film A Teacher, which follows an affair had between a teacher (Burdge) and her student. The film premiered at the Sundance Film Festival on January 20, 2013, and was given a limited release in the United States on September 6, 2013. She has since co-starred in a number of films, including Wild Canaries (2014), The Midnight Swim (2014), The Invitation (2015), 6 Years (2015), and Thirst Street (2017).

== Filmography ==
Film
Year	Title	Role	Notes
2008	Actually, Adieu My Love	Olivia Sanders	
2008	I Will Possess Your Heart	The Girl	
2010	Failing Better Now	Summer	
2010	We're Glad You're Here	Catherine	
2012	Frances Ha	Dark Haired Girl	
2012	First Winter	Marie	
2012	All the Light in the Sky	Suzanne	
2012	White Fox Mask	Vivienne	
2013	A Teacher	Diana Watts	
2013	Lily	Emily	
2014	Wild Canaries	Annabell	
2014	The Midnight Swim	June	
2014	The Sideways Light	Lily	
2015	Up the River	Rebecca	
2015	The Invitation	Sadie	
2015	6 Years	Amanda	
2015	Some Beasts	Anna	
2015	Devil Town	Isabel Phillips	
2015	Tears of God	The Lich	
2015	Lace Crater	Ruth	
2015	Digging for Fire	Lucy	
2016	Actor Martinez	Lindsay	
2016	10 Crosby	Lindsay	Short film
2016	Baby Teeth	Erin	Short film
2016	Dramatic Relationships		Short film
2016	Cloudy All Day	Kate	Short film
2016	Fill Your Heart With French Fries	Emma	Short film
2017	XX	Madeline	
2017	Thirst Street	Gina	
2018	The Long Dumb Road	Girl in Car	
2018	Duck Butter	Kate	
2018	86'd	Mistress Lashes	Short film
2018	Her Smell	Lauren	
2020	Black Bear	Maude	
2020	The Carnivores	Brett	
2020	Materna	Ruth	
2020	You Mean Everything to Me	Roxanne	
2023	Can't Seem To Make You Mine	Tess	
2024	Between the Temples	Darcy	
2024	Eco Village	Ursula	
TBA	Soft Landings †	Marian	Short film; post-production since December 2021
TBA	Dating & Private Lives †	Emily	Filming

Key
†	Denotes film or TV productions that have not yet been released

Television
Year	Title	Role	Notes
2010	Food Party	Grape Jenny	Episode: "PBJ Love"
2016	Veep	Reporter	Episode: "C**tgate"
2017-2019	Easy	Amy	3 episodes
2018	Casual		Episode: "Virtual Reality"
2018	One Dollar	Jenny	Episode: "Jenny Ludlow"
2023	Bupkis	Lizzie	Episode: "ISO"
