= Ciara Bravo =

American actress (born 1997)

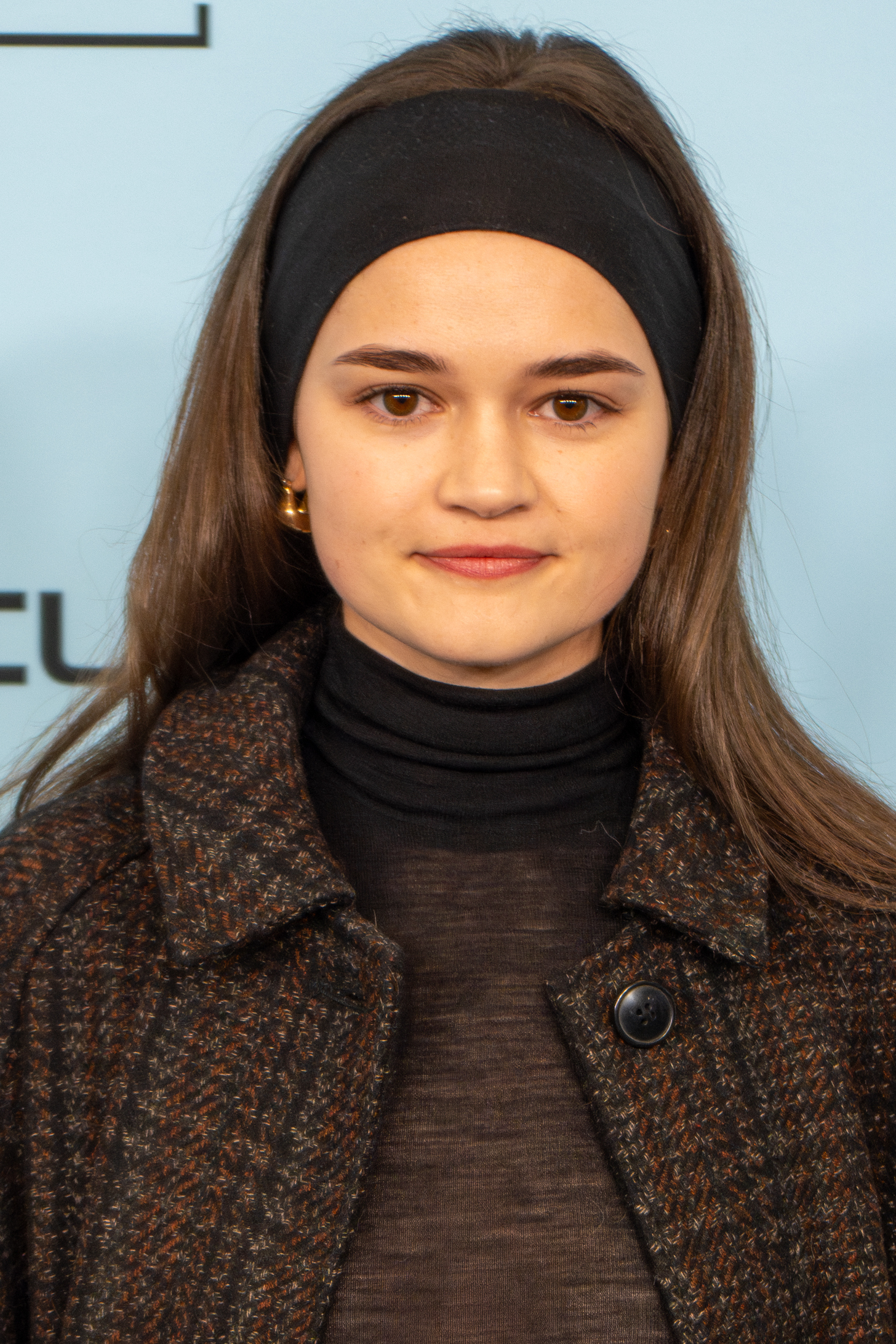
- Bravo at the 2025 Sundance Film Festival
- Born: Ciara Quinn Bravo; March 18, 1997 (age 29); Alexandria, Kentucky, U.S.
- Occupation: Actress
- Years active: 2006–present
- Works: Full list

Ciara Quinn Bravo (/siˈɛərə/; born March 18, 1997) is an American actress. She began her career as a child actress, starring in the Nickelodeon series Big Time Rush and the Fox series Red Band Society. She also appeared in the Nickelodeon television films Jinxed and Swindle. Bravo's voice work includes Giselita in Open Season 3, Patty in Happiness Is a Warm Blanket, Charlie Brown, and Sarah in Special Agent Oso.

== Early life ==
Bravo was born Ciara Quinn Bravo on March 18, 1997, to Tamara "Tammy" (née Ward) and Richard "Rick" Bravo, and raised in Alexandria, Kentucky. She has an older sister and a younger brother. Bravo attended Summit Country Day School nearby in Cincinnati, Ohio.

== Career ==
Bravo's career began at the age of nine after attending the Model and Talent Expo Presented by Mike Beaty in Dallas, Texas. She was discovered by Bryan Leder and Frederick Levy of Management 101. This led to several voice-overs for Playhouse Disney and Can You Teach My Alligator Manners?, an appearance in the Willow Smith music video "Knees and Elbows", and several commercials.

During 2008, she continued pursuing auditions and acted in several local commercials for Newport Aquarium and made a short appearance as an Italian girl in the hit film Angels & Demons.

Bravo acted in two short films, Lost Sheep (or The Cafeteria) and Washed Up; and in the Nickelodeon television series, Big Time Rush and the Fox television series, Red Band Society. Bravo is also a voice actress; she has provided the voice of Giselita in the Open Season franchise. She has also done voice work in Happiness Is a Warm Blanket, Charlie Brown, Special Agent Oso, and The Penguins of Madagascar.

Bravo also appeared in the 2017 film To the Bone, which draws attention to anorexia.

== Filmography ==
=== Film ===
Year	Title	Role	Notes
2009	Angels & Demons	Italian Girl	Uncredited
2009	The Cafeteria	Caroline	Short film
2009	Washed Up	Sarah	Short film
2010	Open Season 3	Giselita	Voice
2013	Swindle	Melissa Bing	
2013	Jinxed	Meg Murphy	
2016	Neighbors 2: Sorority Rising	Sorority Girl	
2017	To The Bone	Tracy	
2017	Dominique's Baby	Charlise	Short film
2018	The Long Dumb Road	Ashley	
2019	The Final Girl Returns	Mavis	Short film
2021	Cherry	Emily	
2021	Coast	Cassie	
2021	Small Engine Repair	Crystal Romanowski	
2025	Last Days	Kayla	
2025	Due West	Haley	
2025	Swiped	Carly	
2025	You're Dating a Narcissist!	Eva	
2026	Voicemails for Isabelle	Isabelle Shaw	

=== Television ===
Year	Title	Role	Notes
2008	Can You Teach My Alligator Manners?	Additional Voices	2 episodes
2009	Special Agent Oso	Sarah	Voice, episode: "Diamonds Are for Kites"
2009–2013	Big Time Rush	Katie Knight	Main cast; 72 episodes
2011	Happiness Is a Warm Blanket, Charlie Brown	Patty	Voice, TV special
2011	My Dog's Christmas Miracle	Heather	TV special
2011	Ice Age: A Mammoth Christmas	Peaches	Voice, TV short
2012	Kinect Star Wars: Girly Vader	Girly Vader	Television film
2012	The Penguins of Madagascar	Hunter	Voice, episode: "Operation: Antarctica"
2012	Big Time Movie	Katie Knight	Television film
2013	Supah Ninjas	Kylee	Episode: "Cheer Fever"
2013	Swindle	Melissa Bing	Television film
2013	The Haunted Hathaways	Blair	Episode: "Haunted Boat"
2013	Jinxed	Meg	Television film
2014–2015	Red Band Society	Emma Chota	Main cast; 13 episodes
2016	Second Chance	Gracie Pritchard	Main cast; 11 episodes
2016	NCIS	Amanda Campbell	Episode: "Rogue"
2017	Agents of S.H.I.E.L.D.	Abby	Episode: "A Life Spent"
2019	Wayne	Delilah "Del" Luccetti	Main cast; 10 episodes
2019	Into the Dark	Lacey	Episode: "Pure"
2020	A Teacher	Mary Smith	3 episodes
2023	Most Dangerous Game	Tina	5 episodes
TBA	Reacher	Eunice	Main cast (season 5)
