= Tony Revolori =

American actor (born 1996)

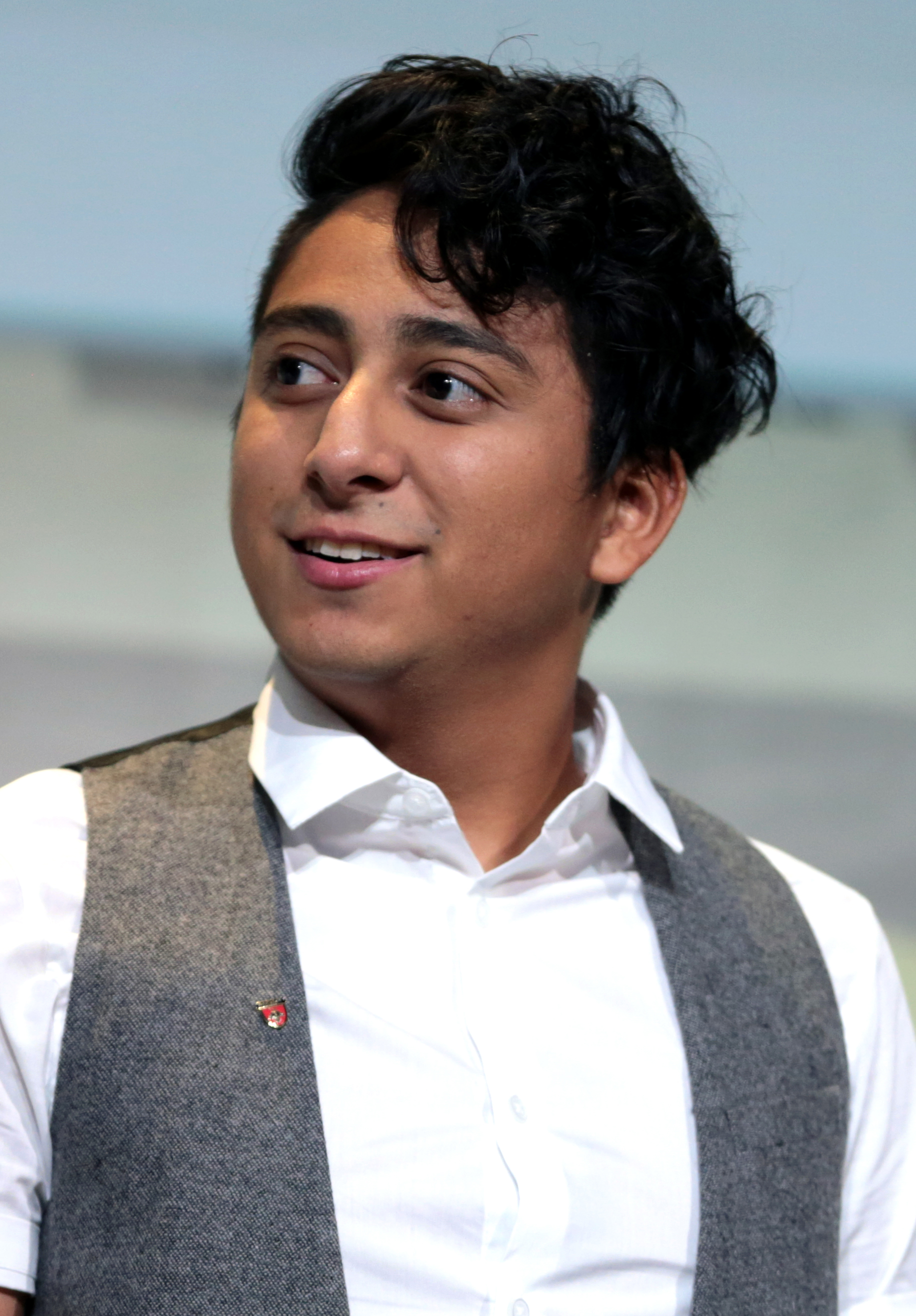
- Revolori in 2016
- Born: Anthony Quiñonez; April 28, 1996 (age 30); Anaheim, California, U.S.
- Occupation: Actor
- Years active: 1998–present

Anthony Quiñonez (born April 28, 1996), known professionally as Tony Revolori, is an American actor. He is best known for his collaborations with Wes Anderson starring in The Grand Budapest Hotel (2014), The French Dispatch (2021), and Asteroid City (2023) and for portraying Flash Thompson in the Marvel Cinematic Universe films Spider-Man: Homecoming (2017), Spider-Man: Far From Home (2019), and Spider-Man: No Way Home (2021).

== Early life ==
Revolori was born and raised in Anaheim, California. His parents, Sonia and Mario Quiñónez, are from Jutiapa, Guatemala. His father was an actor during his earlier years in Guatemala. Revolori's brother, Mario Quiñónez, better known as Mario Revolori, is also an actor. Born Anthony Quiñónez, he adopted "Revolori," the surname of his paternal grandmother.

== Career ==
Revolori began his career as a child actor, getting his first role at age two, in a baby food commercial. His first major role was as the young Zero Moustafa in Wes Anderson's comedy The Grand Budapest Hotel. In 2014, he was named one of the best actors under the age of twenty by IndieWire.

Revolori played Flash Thompson in the 2017 Marvel Cinematic Universe superhero film Spider-Man: Homecoming and its 2019 sequel. Because of his casting, and the fact that the character was re-imagined as something other than a stereotypical jock bully, Revolori received hate mail and death threats from certain fans of the comics. In 2021, Revolori returned in the third film Spider-Man: No Way Home. He also had a lead role in Hannah Fidell's comedy The Long Dumb Road, opposite Jason Mantzoukas.

On June 17, 2022, Revolori appeared on a self-titled skit off of rapper Logic's seventh studio album Vinyl Days, in which he is calling to confirm a movie night with the artist.

In July 2022, Nickelodeon announced that Revolori would voice the character Deuce Gorgon in the 2022 animated reboot series Monster High. In 2023, he appeared in the horror film Scream VI. In 2026, Revolori played "MarriedAndLookingForFun31313," in Primetime.

== Personal life ==
Revolori has dyslexia. He had a past relationship with filmmaker and musician Mariah Morgenstern (stage name Myah).

== Awards ==
In 2018, Revolori was awarded an Impact Award by the National Hispanic Media Coalition for his "Outstanding Performance in a Motion Picture."

== Filmography ==
Key
†	Denotes films that have not yet been released

=== Film ===
Year	Title	Role	Notes	Ref.
2004	Nebraska	Younger Boy	Short film	
2008	Smother	Waylon	Short film	
2009	The Perfect Game	Fidel Ruiz		
2009	Spout	Twin Shaun	Short film	
2013	Fitz and Slade	Kid #2		
2014	The Grand Budapest Hotel	Zero Moustafa		
2014	Special Delivery	Ramiro	Short film	
2015	Umrika	Older Lalu		
2015	Dope	James "Jib" Caldones		
2016	The 5th Wave	Dumbo		
2016	Lowriders	Chuy Herrera		
2017	Take the 10	Chester Tamborghini		
2017	Table 19	Renzo Eckberg		
2017	Spider-Man: Homecoming	Eugene "Flash" Thompson		
2017	Please Stand By	Nemo		
2018	The Long Dumb Road	Nathan		
2019	The Sound of Silence	Samuel Diaz		
2019	Spider-Man: Far From Home	Eugene "Flash" Thompson		
2019	Peter's To-Do List	Eugene "Flash" Thompson	Short film	
2020	Run	Brooklyn Boy (voice)		
2021	The French Dispatch	Young Moses Rosenthaler		
2021	Spider-Man: No Way Home	Eugene "Flash" Thompson		
2023	Scream VI	Jason Carvey		
2023	Asteroid City	Aide-de-Camp		
2023	The Boy and the Heron	Parakeet (voice)		
2025	The Rivals of Amziah King	Colmar		
2025	Roofman	Duane		
2025	Paradise Records	Slaydras		
2026	Primetime	MarriedAndLookingForFun31313		
2027	K-Pop: The Debut †		Post-production	

=== Television ===
Year	Title	Role	Notes
2006	The Unit	Boy	Episode: "True Believers"
2007	Entourage	Son	Episode: "Welcome to the Jungle"
2008	Ernesto	Teenage Hilario	Television film
2009	My Name Is Earl	Hunhau	Episode: "My Name is Alias"
2010	Sons of Tucson	Paco	Episode: "Family Album"
2013	Shameless	Sanchez	Episode: "The American Dream"
2016	Son of Zorn	Scott Schmidt	Recurring role
2017	Workaholics	Dougie	Episode: "Party Gawds"
2017–18	OK K.O.! Let's Be Heroes	Chameleon Jr., Dolph Finn (voices)	2 episodes
2019–23	Servant	Tobe	Recurring role
2020	Craig of the Creek	Nate Moger III (voice)	Episode: "Pencil Break Mania"
2020	Royalties	Theo	Main role
2022–23	Willow	Prince Graydon Hastur	Main role
2022–24	Monster High	Deuce Gorgon (voice)	Main role
2024	Lego Star Wars: Rebuild the Galaxy	Dev Greebling (voice)	Main role

=== Video games ===
Year	Title	Role	Notes
2026	Grand Theft Auto VI	The Local Population	

=== Web series ===
Year	Title	Role	Notes
2019–22	The Daily Bugle	Eugene "Flash" Thompson	3 episodes

== Theatre ==
Year	Title	Role	Notes
2015	Mercury Fur	Naz	Pershing Square Signature Center/The Romulus Linney Courtyard Theatre
2017	Speech & Debate	Solomon	London Trafalgar Studios
