= Lily (2013 film) =

- Directed by: Matt Creed
- Written by: Matt Creed; Amy Grantham
- Produced by: Matt Creed; Hunter Gray; Alex Orlovsky; Izabella Tzenkova
- Starring: Amy Grantham; Simon Chaput; Lindsay Burdge; Rebecca Street
- Cinematography: Brett Jutkiewicz
- Edited by: Brett Jutkiewicz
- Production company: Up The River Films
- Release dates: 27 June 2013 (Nantucket Film Festival); 12 December 2014 (US)
- Running time: 87 minutes
- Country: United States
- Language: English

Lily is a 2013 American drama film directed by Matt Creed, starring Amy Grantham, Simon Chaput, Lindsay Burdge and Rebecca Street.

== Cast ==
- Amy Grantham as Lily
- Simon Chaput as Aaron
- Lindsay Burdge as Emily
- Rebecca Street as Nell
- Benjamin Slater as Jake
- Zachary Unger as Kyle
- David Andalman as Dave
- Drew DeMaio as Will
- Michael Harrah as Neil
- Erika Latta as Laura
- Mike Lisenco as Fertility Doctor
- Conan McCarty as Michael

== Reception ==
Gabe Toro of IndieWire rated the film a "B+" wrote that Creed "clearly gets the appeal of a place romanticized by locals and visitors, and how the drama experienced in the city is given an added dimension by our environment"

Mark Adams of Screen Daily wrote, "There are moments of low-key drama – she gets drunk at a dinner party with her boyfriend’s rather pompous friends, and she seeks out the father she hasn’t seen in three years - but the emphasis is on the intimate moments of her reevaluating her life."

The St. Paul Pioneer Press wrote that while "there are moments when characters verge on caricatures", Creed and Grantham "have managed to create something weighty with a small budget and push the cancer narrative in a new and worthy direction."
