= 2015 Champs-Élysées Film Festival =

- Location: Paris, France
- Founded: 2012
- Festival date: 10–16 June 2015
- Website: champselyseesfilmfestival.com

The fourth annual edition of the Champs-Élysées Film Festival was held from 10 to 16 June 2015.
