= A Teacher =

2013 film

- Theatrical release poster
- Directed by: Hannah Fidell
- Written by: Hannah Fidell
- Produced by: Hannah Fidell; Kim Sherman
- Starring: Lindsay Burdge; Will Brittain; Jennifer Prediger
- Cinematography: Andrew Droz Palermo
- Edited by: Sofi Marshall
- Music by: Brian McOmber
- Production company: Flaneur Films
- Distributed by: Oscilloscope Laboratories
- Release dates: January 20, 2013 (Sundance); September 6, 2013 (United States)
- Running time: 75 minutes
- Country: United States
- Language: English
- Box office: $8,348

A Teacher is a 2013 American drama film written and directed by Hannah Fidell, in her feature directorial debut. It revolves around a female high school teacher's illicit sexual relationship with a male student that turns from infatuation into obsession. Principal photography for the film took place in Austin, Texas. The film had its premiere at the 2013 Sundance Film Festival on January 20, 2013. The film was released on video on demand on August 20, 2013, prior to receiving a limited release on September 6, 2013, in the United States.

While praise was given towards the film's performances, cinematography, score, and its attempt to explore a complex issue, criticisms were reserved over a narrative lack of focus, exposition, and character development. In 2014, it was announced the film would be adapted as a TV series, with Fidell executive producing. Kate Mara became attached to star as the lead and also as an executive producer. A Teacher, the resulting miniseries, premiered on FX on Hulu in November 2020.

== Plot ==
Diana Watts, a high school English teacher in suburban Texas, is having an affair with Eric Tull, one of her students. In class, Diana and Eric hide their relationship.

One day, Diana meets with her brother, Hunter, but as soon as he brings up their mother's declining health, Diana becomes overwhelmed and leaves. Her roommate, Sophia, later tells Diana that she wants to introduce her to single men, Rich and Dan, at a party. While Sophia is talking, Diana walks into the bathroom to take a topless photo to send to Eric. She later attends the party with Sophia and meets Rich and Dan, both of whom she finds uninteresting. She makes an excuse to leave the party early.

After the holiday break, Diana is told by Jessica, a fellow teacher, that a topless photo of a student has been circulating around the school. While Jessica laments how careless teenagers can be, Diana realizes that the photo she sent Eric could be spread just as easily. She meets with Eric after school in the parking lot and asks him to delete the photo, which he does. On another occasion, Eric tells Diana that a girl asked him to the Sadie Hawkins dance. Diana becomes jealous, but Eric reassures her that it means nothing and he is only going with this girl to avoid suspicion.

Diana and Eric go on a weekend getaway at his family's ranch. The next morning, as they are having sex, the ranch foreman, James, arrives at the property and, noticing Eric's car, knocks on the door. Diana hides in the bathroom while Eric speaks to James. After James leaves, Diana is shaken and asks a nonchalant Eric if James will tell his father. Eric says that there is nothing to worry about, but Diana insists that she could lose her job if they are caught. She says that they should put their relationship on hold for a while and goes to the porch to be alone. Eric joins her and tries to seduce her, eventually becoming aggressive. She pushes him away.

At school, Diana confesses to Eric that she misses him and invites him to come over later. During the conversation, Jessica comes into the classroom and accidentally interrupts them. Diana tries to play it off as a school-related meeting. Later, at her house, Diana and Eric begin having sex when she starts to act unstable. She goes from pushing him away, saying that what they are doing is wrong, to clinging to him and begging him to stay. Frustrated with her erratic behavior, Eric storms out right as Sophia is returning home. Sophia watches in shock as Diana chases after Eric.

Diana drives to Eric's house, parks outside and calls his mobile number. When he does not respond, she calls his family's landline. Eric's father answers and when she asks for Eric, he tells her that it is late and, assuming that she is a classmate, advises that she speak to him at school the next day. Diana sneaks up to Eric's bedroom window to try to get him to speak with her. Eric begrudgingly goes outside, where she tells him that they can "work through this" and that, since he will be attending the University of Texas the following year, they can "stay together". Eric rebuffs her advances and his father comes outside to check on him, causing Diana to run back to her car and leave.

Diana drives to a motel, and after checking into a room, she attempts to call Eric, who has blocked her. After, she checks her voicemail. She has received a message from a staff member at the school, telling her that there is an issue with one of her students, Eric, whose father is at the school, and urging her to call back. Diana, curled up on the bed, cries.

== Cast ==
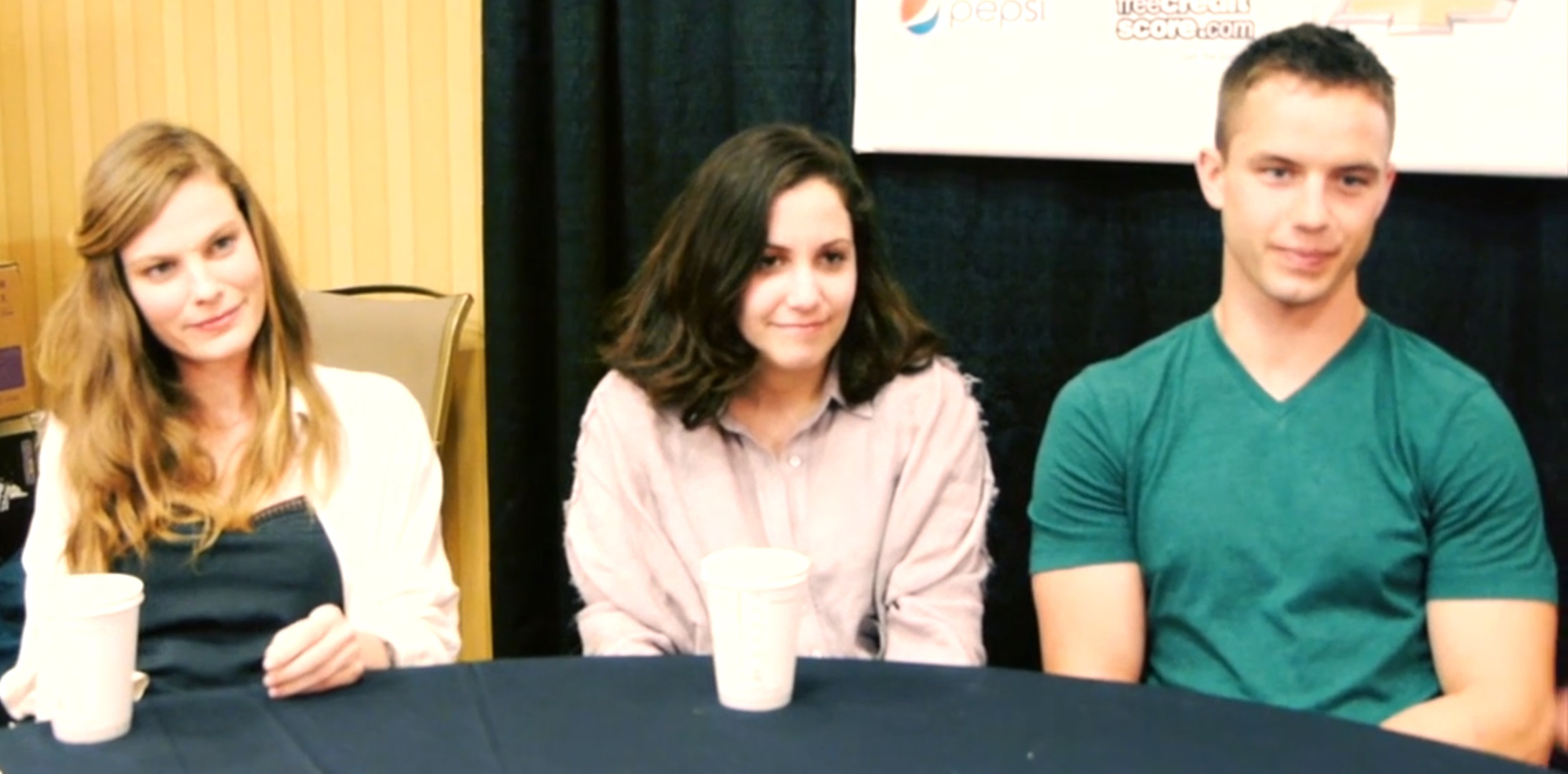
(left to right) Lindsay Burdge, Hannah Fidell, Will Brittain interviewed at SXSW about A Teacher in 2013

- Lindsay Burdge as Diana Watts
- Will Brittain as Eric Tull
- Jennifer Prediger as Sophia
- Jonny Mars as Hunter Watts
- Julie Phillips as Jessica
- Matthew Genitempo as Dan
- Cody Haltom as Rich
- Lanie Overton as Lanie
- Chris Doubek as Eric's father
- Don Hampton as James

== Release ==
A Teacher was premiered at the 2013 Sundance Film Festival on January 20, 2013, and was subsequently screened at festivals such as SXSW Film Festival, Thessaloniki International Film Festival, Maryland Film Festival and Oldenburg International Film Festival. It was acquired for U.S. distribution by Oscilloscope Laboratories. In the Netherlands, it was distributed by Film1 Sundance Channel. The film was released in the United States through video on demand on August 20, 2013, prior to receiving a limited release on September 6, 2013.

=== Box office ===
The film was released in a limited release on September 6, 2013, and grossed $4,684 from two theaters, ranking number 87 on the box office chart. The film went on to earn a total domestic gross of $8,348. The film's widest release was in seven theaters.

== Reception ==
=== Critical response ===
The film received mixed reviews from film critics. Review aggregator website Rotten Tomatoes gave the film 34% from 32 reviews. Marsha McCreadie from RogerEbert.com wrote: "A Teacher will leave you feeling drained, even exhausted. That's about right for a movie about obsession, one with no resolution except waiting for the other thud to drop... Much of the movie takes place in dark interiors. The love-making scenes are steamy, seemingly passionate; risqué not pornographic. Happily, a little something is left to the imagination. Though after a while you're itchy to get out of the bedroom, or the old high school staple, the car. The "one-room" claustrophobia is reminiscent of being trapped in the love-nest of Last Tango in Paris... To her great credit, director Fidell – named by Filmmaker Magazine as one of the 25 New Faces of Independent Film – takes on a tricky topic. She even gets us to empathize with the person in the power spot."

The New York Post wrote: "A teacher sexually obsessed with the high school student with whom she's having an illicit affair gradually loses her bearings in an evocative but ultimately hollow indie drama. Writer-director Hannah Fidell makes the common indie mistake of thinking that a dramatic situation is all you need for a movie, but demonstrates an impressive restraint and an ability to manufacture queasy suspense without much dialogue."

Ignatiy Vishnevetsky from The A.V. Club gave a positive review, writing: "Because contemporary indies tend to overvalue broad generational statements, A Teacher – which is candid, character focused, and only 75 minutes long – initially feels like a breath of fresh air. (The movie draws inevitable comparisons to the recent The Lifeguard, which is also about a female ephebophile.) Very little time is wasted on exposition; when the movie starts, Burdge is already meeting for regular trysts with teenager Will Brittain... Writer-director Hannah Fidell works in a style that's arty but simple: naturalistic lighting, camera movement that always follows character movement, and a modernist score (by Brian McOmber, formerly of Dirty Projectors) that conveys dread without ever suggesting outright horror."

For Slackerwood, journalist Jordan Gass-Pooré wrote: "Burdge's performance is like lightning in a bottle: subtle and unpredictable. There are instances where Diana alters her voice to sound younger when she's speaking with Eric. Outside of the classroom, Diana is the submissive, never speaking to Eric, but with him. She allows him to consume her little by little, and watches as he spits her out, making her emotional and physical breakdown all the more heart wrenching."

=== Accolades ===
Year	Award	Category	Work	Result
2012	Champs-Élysées Film Festival	US in Progress Official Selection	A Teacher	Won
2013	Just Film Award	Best Youth Film	A Teacher	Nominated
2013	Oldenburg International Film Festival	German Independence Award – Audience Award	Hannah Fidell	Nominated
2013	SXSW Film Festival	Emerging Woman Award	Hannah Fidell	Won
2013	Camerimage	Best Cinematography Debut	Andrew Droz Palermo	Nominated

== Miniseries adaptation ==
In February 2014, it was revealed that A Teacher would be adapted for television by HBO. Fidell would write and executive produce the series along with Danny Brocklehurst, the former showrunner of the UK television series Shameless. In August 2018, it was announced Kate Mara would star in the series and serve as an executive producer, while Fidell would also direct the series, set up at FX instead of HBO. The miniseries was released FX on Hulu from November 10, 2020, to December 29, 2020.
