= The Long Dumb Road =

- Theatrical release poster
- Directed by: Hannah Fidell
- Written by: Hannah Fidell; Carson D. Mell
- Produced by: Jonathan Duffy; Hannah Fidell; Jacqueline Ingram; Kelly Williams
- Starring: Tony Revolori; Jason Mantzoukas; Taissa Farmiga; Grace Gummer; Casey Wilson; Pamela Reed; Ron Livingston
- Cinematography: Andrew Droz Palermo
- Edited by: Zach Clark
- Music by: Keegan DeWitt
- Production companies: Gamechanger Films; Pretty Good Films; Ten Acre Films
- Distributed by: Universal Pictures
- Release dates: January 26, 2018 (Sundance); November 9, 2018 (United States)
- Running time: 90 minutes
- Country: United States
- Language: English
- Box office: $4,667

The Long Dumb Road is a 2018 American road trip comedy film written, directed and produced by Hannah Fidell and co-written by Carson D. Mell. It stars Tony Revolori, Jason Mantzoukas, Taissa Farmiga, Grace Gummer, Casey Wilson, Pamela Reed, and Ron Livingston.

The film had its world premiere at the Sundance Film Festival on January 26, 2018. It was released on November 9, 2018, by Universal Pictures.

== Premise ==
Two guys serendipitously meet at a time when they both find themselves at personal crossroads. They then decide to embark on an unplanned road trip together across the American Southwest.

== Cast ==
- Tony Revolori as Nathan
- Jason Mantzoukas as Richard
- Taissa Farmiga as Rebecca
- Grace Gummer as Nina
- Casey Wilson as Sharon Richards
- Pamela Reed as Dotty
- Ron Livingston as François
- Ciara Bravo as Ashly Richards
- Annie Lederman as Monica
- Lindsay Burdge as Girl in Car
- Will Brittain as Dude in Car

== Production ==
=== Development ===
At South by Southwest in March 2015, where her film 6 Years was premiering, director Hannah Fidell revealed that she had co-written a screenplay for a road trip comedy film with her friend Carson D. Mell, writer of Silicon Valley. The previous year, she had directed a short film version of the script, titled The Road, with Mell and Peter Vack starring in the main roles and Andrew Droz Palermo serving as director of photography.

=== Casting ===
On April 12, 2017, as additional photography was about to commence, it was reported that Tony Revolori and Jason Mantzoukas would play the roles Mell and Vack portrayed in the short film version. Taissa Farmiga, Grace Gummer, Ron Livingston, Casey Wilson, Pamela Reed, and Ciara Bravo were cast in supporting roles.

=== Filming ===
Principal photography began in January 2017 in Albuquerque, New Mexico. Filming continued in Albuquerque and Belen, New Mexico in April 2017.

== Release ==
The Long Dumb Road had its world premiere at the Sundance Film Festival on January 26, 2018. Shortly after, Universal Pictures acquired distribution rights to the film. It was released on November 9, 2018.

== Reception ==
On review aggregation website Rotten Tomatoes, the film has an approval rating of 75% based on 28 reviews, with an average of 6.1/10. The site's critical consensus reads, "The Long Dumb Road navigates the odd couple road trip comedy formula fairly smoothly, thanks mainly to the chemistry between Tony Revolori and Jason Mantzoukas." Metacritic assigned the film a weighted average score of 64 out of 100, based on reviews from 12 critics, indicating "generally favorable reviews".

Amy Nicholson of Variety gave a positive review, writing, "The adventure is aimless, but the company is good," and praised the film for paying attention to character over broad comedy.
