= SATS =

SATS may refer to:

== Transportation ==
- SATS (company)
  - SATS Security Services
- Short Airfield for Tactical Support
- Small Aircraft Transportation System
- Stansted Airport Transit System

== Other uses ==
- EchoStar Corporation, an American telecommunications company, which formerly had the stock symbol SATS
- Blood oxygen saturation, known as "sats"
- South African Theological Seminary
- National Curriculum assessment, in the UK, colloquially known as Sats or SATs
- Sats, short for satoshis, a unit of a bitcoin equivalent to 0.00000001

== See also ==
- SAT (disambiguation)
- Superman: The Animated Series (STAS)
