= Champs-Élysées Film Festival =

Annual film festival in Paris, France

- Location: Paris, France
- Founded: 2012
- Most recent: 2025
- Website: www.champselyseesfilmfestival.com

The Champs-Élysées Film Festival is a film festival that takes place annually in Paris, France. The festival consists of French and American feature-length films and short films. There are competitive films that may be eligible for several awards, and a group of out-of-competition selections like retrospectives and avant-premieres. Two film industry-targeted events are hosted alongside the Festival: the US in Progress Paris program and the Paris Coproduction Village, the latter co-organized with Les Arcs European Film Festival. Around 25,000 spectators and professionals attend the festival each year, and 60,000 people attended the free-of-charge, digital 2020 screenings.

Unlike many festivals, Champs-Élysées includes documentaries in the official competition rather than in a special section.

Though the Champs-Élysées Film Festival is usually held annually in June, the 10th Champs-Élysées Film Festival was held from 14 to 21 September 2021. The latest Champs-Élysées Film Festival was held from 18 to 25 June 2024, making it the 13th edition.

== History ==
The Festival was created by Paris-based French film distributor and exhibitor Sophie Dulac to build a bridge between the French and American film industries. Participating movie theaters are located alongside the Avenue des Champs-Élysées in Paris, including the Balzac, Gaumont Champs-Elysées, the Lincoln, the Publicis Cinéma and UGC George V.

== 2012 edition ==
The first edition of the Festival was held from June 6 to June 12, with actors Lambert Wilson and Michael Madsen presiding. During the first edition, more than 15,000 people attended, with more than 50 films screened. Besides the Official Selection of American Independent Films, the Festival's main event, three other non-competitive selections were presented: French Galas, American Galas and Oscar Nominated Foreign Language Films. A competitive Official Shorts Selection was also showcased. Donald Sutherland participated in a conversation following a screening of Alan J. Pakula's Klute, in which he co-starred alongside Jane Fonda. A tribute to Harvey Weinstein was held to celebrate his career and a retrospective of 11 of his films was shown throughout the week. Three Audience Prizes (Best American Feature-Length Film, Best American Short Film, Best French Short Film) were presented during the Closing Ceremony, held at the Publicis Cinema. Hannah Fidell’s directorial debut, A Teacher, about a Texas teacher who has an affair with a student, won the top prize at the inaugural Champs-Elysées Film Festival's US in Progress event.

== 2013 edition ==
The second edition of the Festival was held from June 12 to June 18, with actor Olivier Martinez presiding. Struck by Lightning, by Brian Daddelly, was screened at the Opening Ceremony, while Shari Springer Berman and Robert Pulcini's Imogene was shown at the Closing Ceremony. Along with its competitive Official Selections for American feature-length films, American Shorts and French Shorts, the Festival presented a wide selection of important American and French movie premieres, a 7-film Brad Pitt retrospective to mark the release of World War Z and The TCM Cinema Essentials, a thirteen-film selection of American and French classics. Three Audience Prizes (Best American Feature-Length Film, Best American Short Film, Best French Short Film) were presented during the Closing Ceremony, held at the Publicis Cinema.

== 2014 edition ==
The third edition was held from June 11 to June 17, 2014, with actors Jacqueline Bisset and Bertrand Tavernier as Honorary Presidents and Keanu Reeves, Agnès Varda, Whit Stillman and Mike Figgis as guests of honor. More than 120,000 people attended the Festival, with more than 110 films screened. Ronit Elkabetz and Shlomi Elkabetz's Gett: The Trial of Viviane Amsalem was shown at the Closing Ceremony. Along with its competitive Official Selections for American feature-length films, American Shorts and French Shorts, the Festival presented a wide selection of important American and French movie premieres, the TCM Cinema Essentials, a thirteen-film selection of American classics, and the Great French Classics, a five-film selection. Both Honorary Presidents held masterclasses, and the guests of honor presented each a selection of their respective filmographies. Three Audience Prizes (Best American Feature-Length Film, Best American Short Film, Best French Short Film), a Bloggers Jury Award (Best American Feature-Length Film) and a Youth Jury Award (Favorite Film in the TCM Cinema Essentials Selection) were presented during the Closing Ceremony, held at the Publicis Cinema. Along with the US in Progress program, a new event targeted at industry professionals was held alongside the Festival: titled Paris Coproduction Village it brought together 12 international feature film projects in development looking for French and European partners, as well as 6 projects from the Cannes Film Festival Cinefondation Residence.

== 2015 edition ==
The fourth edition was held from 10 to 16 June 2015. The eight competition titles included two documentaries that previously competed at 2015 Sundance Film Festival: Matthew Heineman’s Cartel Land and Michael Beach Nichols and Christopher K. Walker’s Welcome to Leith. Guillaume Nicloux’s Valley of Love, starring Isabelle Huppert and Gerard Depardieu, was the opening night film. Fox screened the comedy Spy, written and directed by Paul Feig and starring Melissa McCarthy. Festival guest Jeremy Irons presented a "master class." The Road Within, the directorial debut of screenwriter and actress Gren Wells, starring Robert Sheehan, Dev Patel and Zoë Kravitz, won the Audience Award at the festival.

== 2016 edition ==
The fifth edition of the festival was held from 7 to 14 June 2016. The jury presidents were Alexandre Aja and Nicole Garcia. Other festival guests included director Mia Hansen-Løve, writer-director Abel Ferrara, actor-director Brady Corbet, and director Andrew Davis.

== 2017 edition ==
The sixth edition of the festival was held 15 to 20 June 2017. Presided by American director Randal Kleiser and French writer Pierre Lemaitre, the jury included Lolita Chammah, Lola Créton, Vincent Dedienne, Jérémie Elkaïm, Camélia Jordana, Gustave Kervern and Karidja Touré. Lauren Wolkstein and Christopher Radcliff's The Strange Ones, which had its international premiere at the festival, won the Grand Jury Prize for Best American Independent Feature Film.

== 2018 edition ==
The seventh edition of the festival was held 12 to 19 June 2018. Sollers Point, the fourth feature film directed by Johns Hopkins lecturer Matthew Porterfield, starring Jim Belushi and Zazie Beetz, won the top jury prize for an American independent feature at the 2018 edition of the festival.

== 2019 edition ==
The eighth edition of the festival was held 18 to 25 June 2019. James Franco's Pretenders, in which he acts alongside Jack Kilmer, Jane Levy, Shameik Moore, Denis Quaid, and Brian Cox, premiered at the festival in 2019. Sweet Thing, Alexandre Rockwell's sixth feature, also premiered at the 2019 festival.

== 2020 edition ==
The ninth edition of the festival was supposed to be held 16 to 23 June 2020, but due to the COVID-19 pandemic, it was moved entirely online. On 23 April 2020, the festival issued a press release: "Following the government’s announcement in the scope of the actual health crisis pandemic and in order to contribute to the common effort to fight COVID-19, Champs-Élysées Film Festival announces the cancellation of its 9th edition in its original form." The announcement said the 2020 festival would be free and 100% held online, from June 9 to 16, 2020.

== 2021 edition ==
For its 10th edition, held from 14 to 21 September 2021, the festival returned to in-person after the 2020 edition was canceled. Guests of honor included American independent filmmakers Susan Seidelman and Jim Cummings.

== 2022 edition ==
For its 11th edition, held from 21 to 28 June 2022, the festival invited special guests Ari Aster and Dan Deacon. The jurors included Cedric Kahn, Aïssa Maïga, Julia Faure, Lily Gladstone, Sophie Calle, Yann Gonzalez and Daniels, among others.

== 2023 edition ==
For its 12th edition, held from 20 to 27 June 2023, the festival invited American independent filmmakers Ira Sachs and Eliza Hittman as special guests. Other festival guests included Ben Winshaw, Alice Diop and Joel Edgerton.

== 2024 edition ==
The 13th edition was held from 18 to 25 June 2024. Sasquatch Sunset by David and Nathan Zellner was the opening night film.

== 2025 edition ==
The 14th edition was held from 17 to 23 June 2025. Filmmaker Celine Song was a special guest, and there was a retrospective of filmmaker Emma Seligman.
