= Hannah Fidell =

American film director (born 1985)

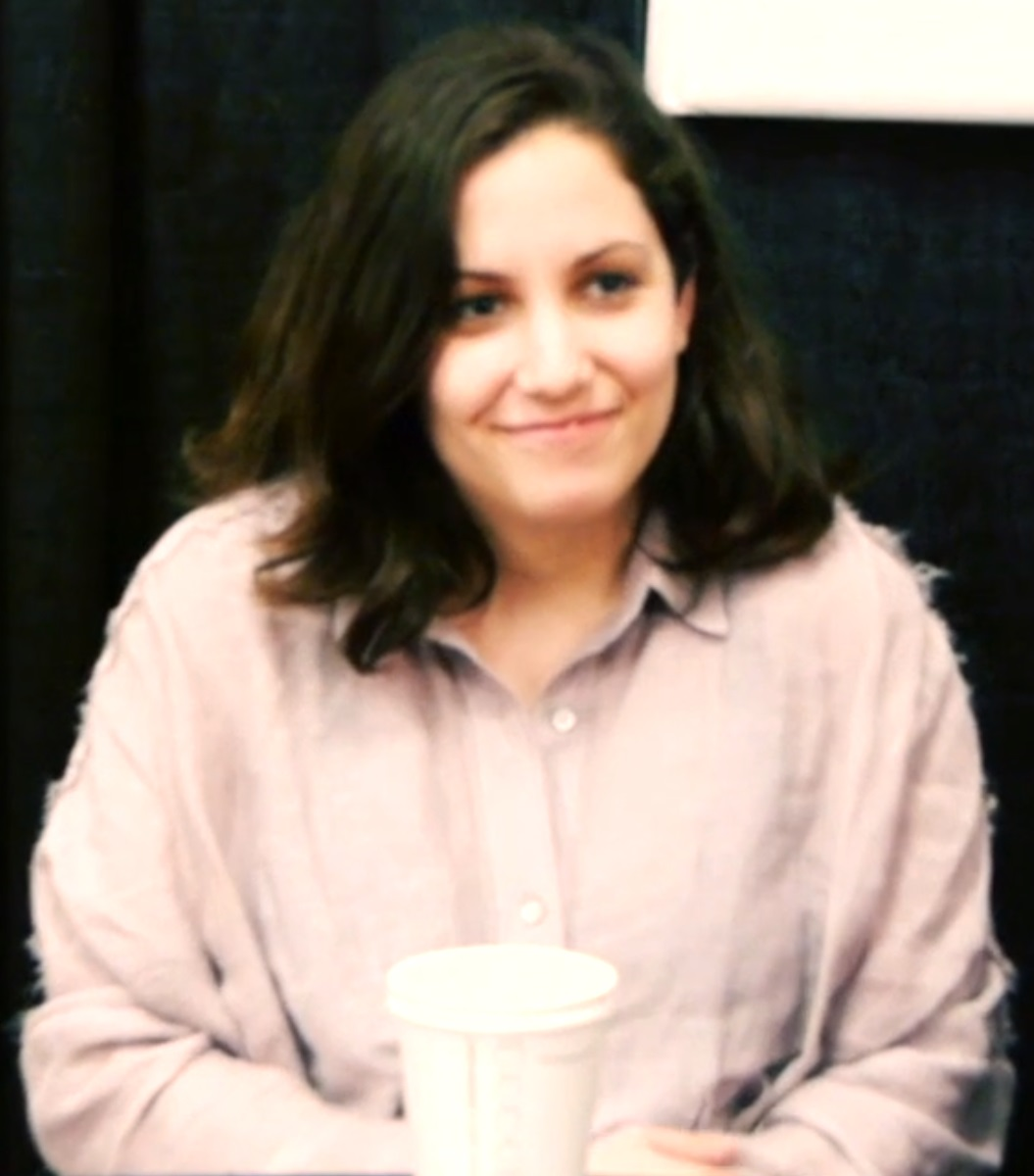
- Fidell at SXSW in 2013
- Born: Hannah Margalit Fidell; October 7, 1985 (age 40); Washington, D.C., U.S.
- Education: Indiana University Bloomington
- Occupations: Director; writer; producer
- Years active: 2010–present
- Spouse: Jake Longstreth (m. 2017)
- Parents: Eugene R. Fidell (father); Linda Greenhouse (mother)

Hannah Margalit Fidell (born October 7, 1985) is an American film director, producer and screenwriter. Her directorial debut was the drama film A Teacher (2013). She also wrote and directed the romantic drama film 6 Years (2015) and the comedy film The Long Dumb Road (2018).

== Early life ==
Fidell was born in Washington, D.C., and raised in Bethesda, Maryland. Her mother is Pulitzer Prize-winning journalist Linda Greenhouse and her father is lawyer Eugene R. Fidell. She studied film theory at Indiana University Bloomington, from which she graduated in 2007. After graduating, Fidell worked at Ridley Scott's commercial production company in New York City, before leaving to study media at The New School. At the time of making A Teacher, she was working part-time at a restaurant to subsidize her filmmaking. In 2012, Filmmaker named Fidell one of the 25 New Faces of Independent Film. She is Jewish, as is her mother.

== Career ==
In 2010, Fidell wrote, directed, produced and acted in the film We're Glad You're Here. The following year, she wrote, directed and produced the short film The Gathering Squall (2011). She also produced the short film Man & Gun (2011).

Fidell wrote, directed, and produced the feature film A Teacher (2013), starring Lindsay Burdge and Will Brittain, which premiered at the 2013 Sundance Film Festival on January 20, 2013. The film follows an affair between a high school teacher and her student. It was released in the United States on September 6, 2013, by Oscilloscope Laboratories. In February 2014, it was announced that A Teacher would be adapted for television by HBO. Fidell will write and executive produce the series along with Danny Brocklehurst, the former showrunner of the UK television series Shameless.

In June 2014, it was announced that Fidell had written and directed the drama film 6 Years, starring Taissa Farmiga and Ben Rosenfield in the lead roles. The film follows a long-term young couple who are about to graduate college, when events threaten to tear them apart. The film had its world premiere at the South by Southwest Film Festival on March 14, 2015. Shortly after the film premiered, the global distribution rights were acquired by Netflix. The film was released on August 18, 2015, on iTunes, and globally through Netflix on September 8, 2015.

Fidell subsequently co-wrote and directed her third feature-length film, The Long Dumb Road, starring Tony Revolori and Jason Mantzoukas in leading roles. The film premiered at the Sundance Film Festival on January 26, 2018. Shortly after, Universal Pictures acquired distribution rights to the film, with a planned day-and-date limited release in November 2018.

In April 2018, it was announced that Fidell and Doug Belgrad were developing a true crime series at Paramount Television based on Rachel Aviv's 2017 The New Yorker article "Remembering the Murder You Didn't Commit", with Fidell set to write and direct. More recently, she signed a deal at FX.

== Personal life ==
Fidell married American artist, musician, and internet radio personality Jake Longstreth on September 23, 2017, in Inverness, California. Her brother-in-law is Dirty Projectors lead singer and guitarist David Longstreth.

== Filmography ==
=== Feature films ===
Year	Film	Director	Writer	Producer	Actor	Notes
2010	We're Glad You're Here	Yes	Yes	Yes	Yes	Role: "Sarah"
2013	A Teacher	Yes	Yes	Yes	No	
2015	6 Years	Yes	Yes	No	No	
2018	The Long Dumb Road	Yes	Yes	Yes	No	

=== Television ===
Year	Film	Director	Writer	Creator	Executive producer	Notes
2018	Casual	Yes	No	No	No	2 episodes
2018	Sorry for Your Loss	Yes	No	No	No	Episode: "A Widow Walks into a Wedding"
2019	The Act	Yes	No	No	No	Episode: "Bonnie & Clyde"
2020	A Teacher	Yes	Yes	Yes	Yes	Directed 6 episodes, wrote 3 episodes
2024	Nobody Wants This	Yes	No	No	No	Directed 2 episodes
2024	Good American Family	Yes	No	No	No	Directed 1 episodes

=== Short films ===
Year	Film	Director	Writer	Producer	Notes
2011	The Gathering Squall	Yes	Yes	Yes	
2011	Man & Gun	No	No	Yes	
2016	The Road	Yes	Yes	Yes	

== Awards and nominations ==
Year	Association	Category	Nominated work	Result
2012	Champs-Élysées Film Festival	US in Progress Official Selection	A Teacher	Won
2013	Just Film Award	Best Youth Film	A Teacher	Nominated
2013	SXSW Film Festival	Emerging Woman Award	A Teacher	Won
2013	Oldenburg International Film Festival	German Independence Award – Audience Award	A Teacher	Nominated
2015	SXSW Film Festival	Grand Jury Award for Narrative Feature	6 Years	Nominated
2015	Champs-Élysées Film Festival	Audience Award for Best American Feature Film	6 Years	Nominated
