= Taissa Farmiga =

American actress (born 1994)

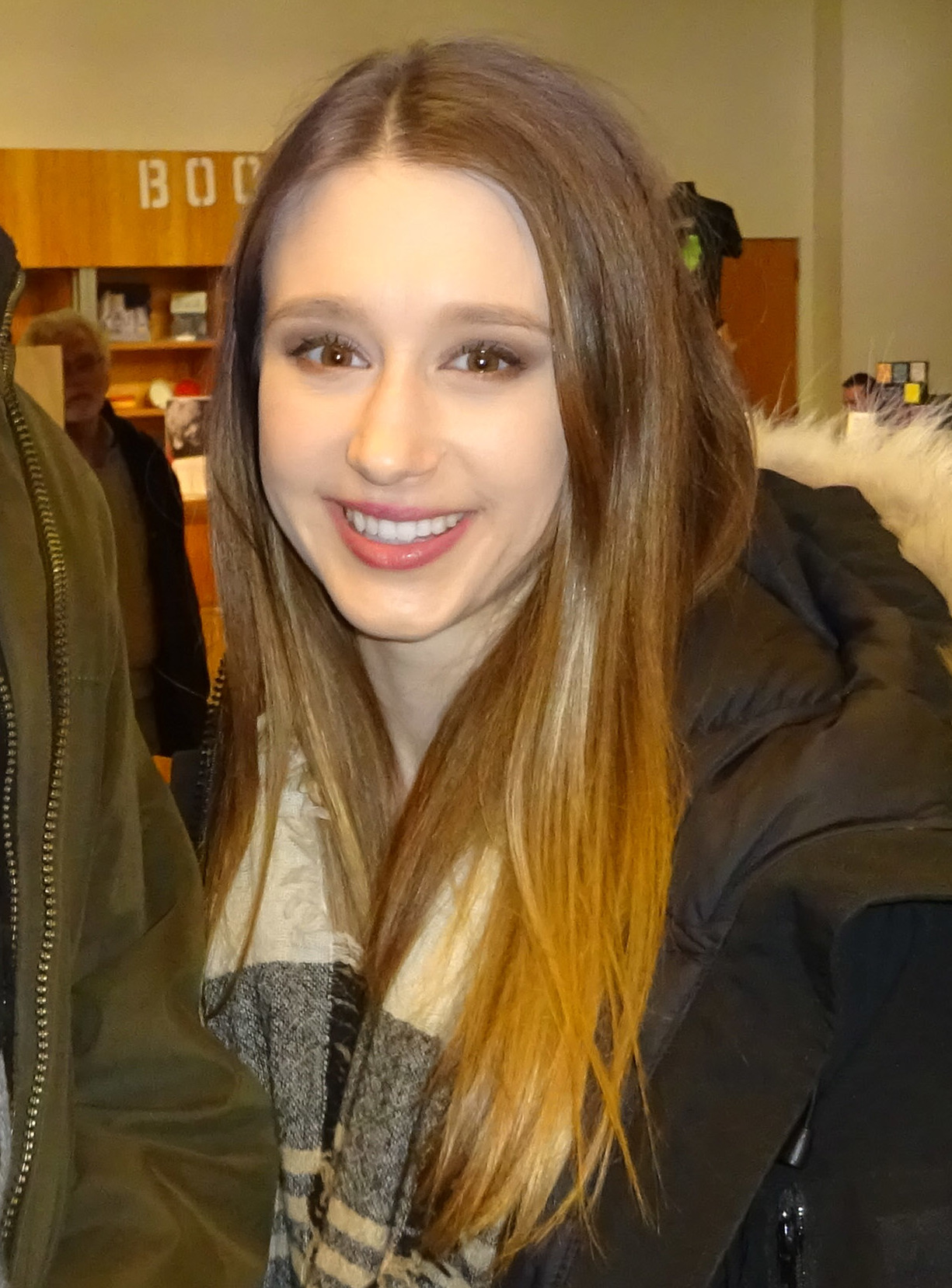
- Farmiga in 2016
- Born: August 17, 1994 (age 32); Whitehouse Station, New Jersey, U.S.
- Occupation: Actress
- Years active: 2010–present
- Spouse: Hadley Klein (m. 2020; div. 2024)
- Relatives: Vera Farmiga (sister); Adriana Farmiga (cousin)

Taissa Farmiga (/tɑːˈiːsə fɑːrˈmiːɡə/ tah-EE-sə far-MEE-gə; born August 17, 1994) is an American actress. Her numerous appearances in horror films have established her as a scream queen, alongside her older sister Vera Farmiga.

Farmiga was encouraged to begin acting by her sister, and subsequently made her debut in Vera's first directorial endeavor, Higher Ground (2011). She rose to prominence for her work on the anthology series American Horror Story, starring in the seasons Murder House (2011), Coven (2013–2014), Roanoke (2016) and Apocalypse (2018). Her early film roles include the crime drama The Bling Ring (2013) and the psychological thriller Mindscape (2013).

Farmiga drew praise for her performances in the comedy slasher film The Final Girls (2015), and the drama films 6 Years (2015) and Share (2015), all of which premiered at South by Southwest, which led her to be named one of the breakout stars of the festival. She has provided the voice of Raven in the DC Animated Movie Universe (2016–2020), starred in the comedy films Rules Don't Apply (2016) and The Long Dumb Road (2018), the drama films In a Valley of Violence (2016) and What They Had (2018), and the supernatural thriller films The Nun (2018) and its sequel (2023).

As of 2022, Farmiga appears as Gladys Russell, an American dollar princess, in the HBO period drama series The Gilded Age. She also featured in the main cast of the procedural drama series Wicked City (2015), and made her stage debut in the Off-Broadway revival of the drama play Buried Child (2016).

== Early life ==
Farmiga was born in Whitehouse Station, New Jersey, on August 17, 1994, the daughter of Ukrainian immigrants Lubomyra (née Spas), a schoolteacher, and Michael Farmiga, a systems analyst. She is the youngest of seven siblings: Victor, Vera, Stephan, Nadia, Alexander "Alex" and Laryssa, the last of whom was born with spina bifida. Her maternal grandparents met at Karlsfeld, a sub-camp of the Dachau concentration camp system, during World War II. Farmiga attended public school until the fourth grade, after which she began being homeschooled by her mother, alongside her two siblings Alex and Laryssa. She has stated that she understands Ukrainian language but can only partially speak it. She is proficient in American Sign Language, having taken classes for four years. Farmiga was raised Pentecostal as her sister Vera and the rest of the family had already been converts from the Ukrainian Greek Catholic Church.

== Career ==
=== 2011–2014: Early work and television breakthrough ===
Although Farmiga initially planned on becoming an accountant, she was persuaded by her sister, Vera, to appear in her directorial debut drama Higher Ground, where she was cast as the 16-year-old version of the lead character, Corinne Walker. Shortly after its premiere at the 2011 Sundance, where Farmiga garnered rave reviews for her performance, she was signed to talent agency ICM Partners.

That same year, Farmiga starred in the first season of FX's anthology series American Horror Story, which launched her to worldwide prominence. Murder House, where she played Violet Harmon, the troubled adolescent daughter of Vivien (Connie Britton) and Ben Harmon (Dylan McDermott), premiered to rave reviews. She secured the role of Violet in her first professional acting audition. She next joined the cast of Sofia Coppola's crime satire The Bling Ring, based on the real life criminal group of the same name, portraying 17-year-old wild child Sam Moore. The film opened in Un Certain Regard at the 2013 Cannes Film Festival to generally positive reviews. She then portrayed Audrey Martin, an uptight teen touring a college campus, in the romantic comedy At Middleton, co-starring with her sister Vera and Andy García. The film premiered at the 2013 Seattle International Film Festival and received a mixed to positive response from critics.

Farmiga returned to the American Horror Story franchise to star as Zoe Benson, a young witch afflicted with a dark and dangerous power in the third season, American Horror Story: Coven (2013–2014), for which she received critical acclaim. She had her first leading film role as Anna Greene in Jorge Dorado's psychological thriller Mindscape, which premiered at the 2013 Sitges Film Festival. Her performance in Mindscape was lauded by critics; comparing her to a young Hannibal Lecter, and La Razón calling her "hypnotic" in the role. She next co-starred as Sarah, the main character's love interest, in the biographical crime drama Jamesy Boy (2014).

=== 2015–2016: Rise to prominence in mainstream film ===
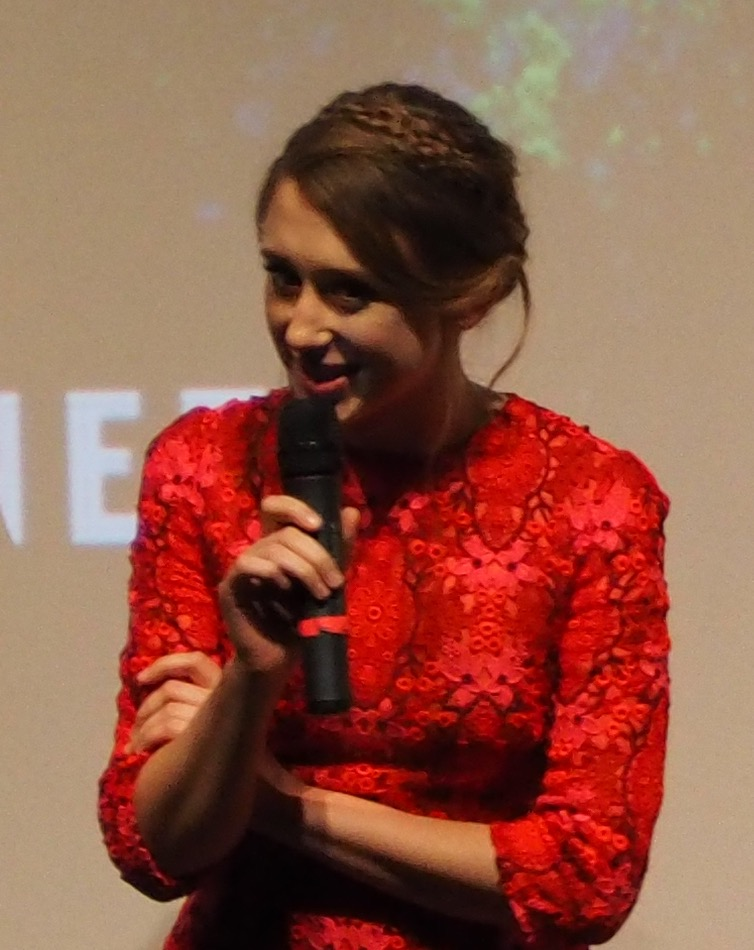
Farmiga at the Toronto International Film Festival premiere of The Final Girls in September 2015.

Farmiga starred in three films that premiered at the 2015 South by Southwest: the first was Todd Strauss-Schulson's critically-acclaimed horror comedy The Final Girls, in which she portrayed the lead role of final girl Max Cartwright, which earned her a Fright Meter Award nomination. The second was Hannah Fidell's heavily improvised romantic drama 6 Years, in which she starred as Melanie Clark. The third and final film was Pippa Bianco's short drama Share, in which she played Krystal Williams, a teenager who returns to school after an explicit video of her sexual assault goes viral. Her performances in all these films were acclaimed, and Farmiga was listed as one of the breakout stars of the festival.

Farmiga next appeared as Karen McClaren, a young journalist who gets caught up in the hunt for a serial killer, in ABC's short-lived crime drama series Wicked City (2015). On filming the series, she stated that, "There's neon lights and billboards and clubs, and it just feels so fun – even though there's a seedy underbelly to it." The series received mixed reviews from critics, and due to low ratings was cancelled after three episodes, with the remaining unaired episodes later debuting on Hulu.

In 2016, she made her stage debut as Shelly in the Off-Broadway revival of Sam Shepard's drama Buried Child, also starring Ed Harris and Amy Madigan. She then starred opposite Ethan Hawke and John Travolta in the Ti West-directed revenge Western film In a Valley of Violence, playing a motormouthed young innkeeper who befriends Hawke's character. The film premiered at the 2016 South by Southwest, and was met with positive reviews. Farmiga made her voice acting debut as the superhero Raven in DC Comics' Justice League vs. Teen Titans, directed by Sam Liu, which premiered at the 2016 WonderCon, and thereafter returned to American Horror Story for the sixth season of the series, Roanoke, where she guest starred as Sophie Green in the November 2016 episode "Chapter 9". Farmiga next co-starred as Sarah Bransford in Warren Beatty's ensemble romantic comedy-drama Rules Don't Apply, which premiered at the 2016 AFI Fest to mixed reviews. The project reunited Farmiga with her Buried Child co-stars Harris and Madigan, who portray her character's parents in the film.

=== 2017–2021: Established film actress ===
Farmiga reprised her voice role as Raven in Teen Titans: The Judas Contract, again directed by Sam Liu, which premiered at the 2017 WonderCon. She next played Emma Ertz in Elizabeth Chomko's drama film What They Had, and re-teamed with director Hannah Fidell for the comedy film The Long Dumb Road, both of which premiered at the 2018 Sundance. Farmiga next appeared as the Catholic novitiate Sister Irene in Corin Hardy's horror film The Nun, the fifth film in The Conjuring Universe, which was released in September 2018, and became the highest-grossing film in its series.

In August 2018, it was confirmed that Farmiga would return to American Horror Story for the eighth season of the series, American Horror Story: Apocalypse, portraying both her Murder House and Coven characters, Violet Harmon and Zoe Benson.

Farmiga then played protagonist Merricat Blackwood in Stacie Passon's film adaptation of Shirley Jackson's mystery novel We Have Always Lived in the Castle, which premiered at the 2018 LA Film Festival. She also appeared alongside Clint Eastwood and Bradley Cooper in the Eastwood-directed drama film The Mule, released in December 2018.

In May 2019, Farmiga appeared as Annie Miller in an episode of the CBS All Access series of The Twilight Zone, a reboot of the 1959 TV series of the same name, where she starred opposite Rhea Seehorn, Luke Kirby and Ike Barinholtz. The following year, she also guest starred as Hannah Stolsfiss in three episodes of the horror anthology series 50 States of Fright for Quibi.

=== 2022–present: The Gilded Age and further film roles ===
In 2022, Farmiga began starring in the HBO period drama series The Gilded Age as socialite Gladys Russell, the daughter of Carrie Coon’s character. The following year, she reprised her role as Sister Irene in the supernatural horror sequel The Nun II.

Farmiga next starred in the independent romantic drama film She Taught Love in the supporting role of Samantha Miron, which was released by Hulu on September 27, 2024.

== Personal life ==
Farmiga owns a home in Los Feliz, Los Angeles. In May 2019, she was reported to be engaged to screenwriter and director Hadley Klein. They were married in an intimate ceremony at their home on August 8, 2020. On the official HBO Gilded Age podcast released July 13, 2025, she announced she was divorced. The divorce apparently dates to early July 2024.

== Filmography ==
=== Film ===
Year	Title	Role	Notes
2011	Higher Ground	Teenage Corinne Walker	
2013	The Bling Ring	Sam Moore	
2013	At Middleton	Audrey Martin	
2013	Mindscape	Anna Greene	
2014	Jamesy Boy	Sarah	
2015	The Final Girls	Max Cartwright	
2015	6 Years	Melanie Clark	
2015	Share	Krystal Williams	Short film
2016	In a Valley of Violence	Mary-Anne	
2016	Justice League vs. Teen Titans	Raven	Voice role
2016	Rules Don't Apply	Sarah Bransford	
2017	Teen Titans: The Judas Contract	Raven	Voice role
2018	What They Had	Emma Ertz	
2018	The Long Dumb Road	Rebecca	
2018	The Nun	Sister Irene Palmer	
2018	We Have Always Lived in the Castle	Merricat Blackwood	
2018	The Mule	Ginny	
2020	Justice League Dark: Apokolips War	Raven	Voice role
2021	John and the Hole	Laurie Shay	
2023	The Nun II	Sister Irene Palmer	
2024	She Taught Love	Samantha Miron	

=== Television ===
Year	Title	Role	Notes
2011	American Horror Story: Murder House	Violet Harmon	12 episodes
2013–2014	American Horror Story: Coven	Zoe Benson	13 episodes
2015	Wicked City	Karen McClaren	8 episodes
2016	American Horror Story: Roanoke	Sophie Green	Episode: "Chapter 9"
2018	American Horror Story: Apocalypse	Zoe Benson	5 episodes
2018	American Horror Story: Apocalypse	Violet Harmon	Episode: "Return to Murder House"
2019	The Twilight Zone	Annie Miller	Episode: "Not All Men"
2020	50 States of Fright	Hannah Stolsfiss	3 episodes
2022–present	The Gilded Age	Gladys Vere, Duchess of Buckingham (née Russell)	Main role

=== Stage ===
Year	Title	Role	Notes
2016	Buried Child	Shelly	The New Group, Off-Broadway

=== Podcast ===
Year	Title	Role	Notes
2023	Radio Play Revival	Marjorie Harvey	Episode: "Bernice Bobs Her Hair"

== Accolades ==
=== Awards and nominations ===
Year	Work	Award	Category	Result	Ref.
2015	The Final Girls	Fright Meter Awards	Best Actress	Nominated	
2023	The Gilded Age	Screen Actors Guild Awards	Outstanding Performance by an Ensemble in a Drama Series	Nominated	

=== Honors ===
- Farmiga was included on Variety magazine's list of "The 14 Women Who Dominated the South by Southwest Film Festival" for her works in The Final Girls (2015) and 6 Years (2015).
- Farmiga was included on the cover of Town & Country magazine's June 2025 issue.
