= Madeline Weinstein =

American actress

- Born: May 22, 1993 (age 33); New York City
- Occupation: Actress
- Years active: 2014–present

Madeline Weinstein is an American actress best known for starring in the Netflix comedy-drama Alex Strangelove (2018) and the independent films Beach Rats (2017) and Between the Temples (2024). She had a recurring role in the HBO drama Mare of Easttown (2021).

On stage, she acted on Broadway in the Tom Stoppard play The Real Thing (2014), and the fantasy epic Harry Potter and the Cursed Child (2018–2019). She has also acted in Off-Broadway productions of Euripides's Medea (2020) and the Itamar Moses play The Ally (2024).

== Early life and education ==
Weinstein was born to a secular Jewish family in New York. She describes her Jewish identity as somewhat "anti-traditionalist" and akin to a legacy of "Jewish labor leftist organizing". Weinstein graduated Northwestern University with a Bachelor of Arts in Theater in 2014.

== Career ==
Weinstein made her Broadway debut in a revival of the Tom Stoppard play The Real Thing (2014). The production starred Ewan McGregor as Henry, Cynthia Nixon as Charlotte and Maggie Gyllenhaal as Annie. Weinstein plays the 17 year old daughter of Charlotte and Henry. The play which explores themes of marriage and infidelity received mixed reviews. The following year played the daughter of the titular character in the world premiere production of the Tracy Letts play Mary Page Marlowe (2016) at the Steppenwolf Theater Company in Chicago. During this time she had minor roles on television acting in the CBS procedural Elementary in 2015, the police drama Blue Bloods, and the NBC crime drama Shades of Blue both in 2017.

She made her feature film debut in the Neon coming-of-age independent film Beach Rats (2017). The film which focuses on sexual repression in Brooklyn was directed by Eliza Hittman and starred Harris Dickinson. Guy Lodge of Variety praised the cast including Weinstein writing, "[She], too, deserves applause for her deft, well-salted turn as Frankie’s more-perceptive-than-she-seems girlfriend". The following year she starred in the Netflix romantic comedy Alex Strangelove and returned to Broadway playing Polly Chaplman in the fantasy epic Harry Potter and the Cursed Child as part of the original cast production.

In 2020 she acted in the modern minimalist production of the Euripides tragedy Medea starring Bobby Cannavale and Rose Byrne at the Brooklyn Academy of Music. Weinstein played Clara, the 24-year-old young lover and catalyst of the play. The following year she took a supporting role in the Nana Mensah directed comedy-drama Queen of Glory (2021) and had a recurring role in the HBO limited series Mare of Easttown (2021) starring Kate Winslet. In 2024 she took a supporting role as a student activist and campus protestor in the Itamar Moses political play The Ally at The Public Theater and as a flirty daughter of a rabbi in the Nathan Silver comedic film Between the Temples (2024).

== Filmography ==
=== Film ===
Year	Title	Role	Notes
2017	Beach Rats	Simone	(Directing Award, Sundance)
2018	Hair Wolf	Rebecca	Short film (Jury Award, Sundance)
2018	Alex Strangelove	Claire	
2018	You Look Good in Blue	Kara	Short film
2021	Queen of Glory	Kaitlin	
2024	Between the Temples	Gabby	

=== Television ===
Year	Title	Role	Notes
2015	Elementary	Allie Newmeyer	Episode: T-Bone and the Iceman
2017	Blue Bloods	Carla Redding	Episode: Genetics
2017	Shades of Blue	Female Intern	Episode: The Quality of Mercy
2018	Kappa Force	Jen Silver	Webseries; 6 episodes
2021	Mare of Easttown	Becca Lynch	4 episodes

== Theatre ==
Year	Title	Role	Playwright	Venue	Ref.
2014	The Real Thing	Debbie	Tom Stoppard	American Airlines Theatre, Broadway	
2016	Mary Page Marlowe	Wendy Gilbert	Tracy Letts	Steppenwolf Theatre, Chicago	
2018–2019	Harry Potter and the Cursed Child	Polly Chapman	Jack Thorne	Lyric Theatre, Broadway	
2020	Medea	Clara	Euripides	Brooklyn Academy of Music, Off-Broadway	
2024	The Ally	Rachel	Itamar Moses	The Public Theater, Off-Broadway	
2025	Jewish Plot	The Supporting Performer	Torrey Townsend	Theatre 154	
