= Radnor and Lee =

American indie folk

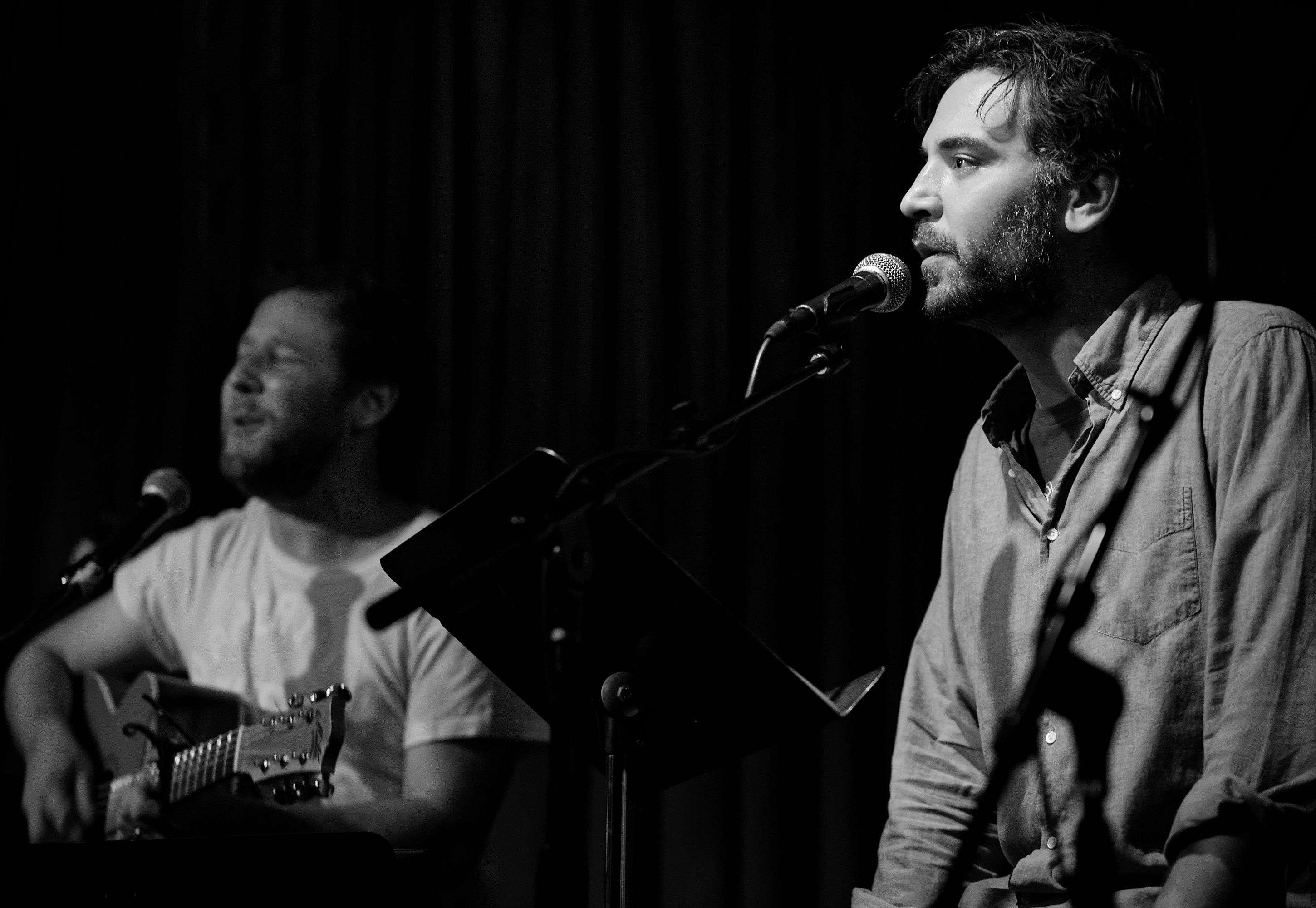
- Radnor and Lee performing live at the Hotel Café in Los Angeles, California, on September 2, 2016

Background information
- Origin: Los Angeles, California, U.S.
- Genres: Acoustic; indie folk; alt country; indie pop
- Years active: 2016–present
- Labels: Gold Village Entertainment; Flower Moon Records
- Members: Josh Radnor; Ben Lee
- Website: radnorandlee.com

Radnor and Lee is an American indie folk musical duo consisting of American actor, filmmaker, author, and musician Josh Radnor, and Ben Lee, Australian indie pop musician and actor. They released their debut, self-titled record on November 10, 2017.

== History ==
=== Formation ===
Radnor is best known for portraying Ted Mosby on the popular Emmy Award-winning CBS sitcom How I Met Your Mother from 2005 to 2014, and writing and directing the 2011 comedy-drama film Happythankyoumoreplease, (which later won a Sundance Film Festival Audience Award) and Liberal Arts. Lee began his career as a musician at the age of 14 with the Sydney band Noise Addict, later releasing 11 solo studio albums and collaborating with artists such as Daniel Johnston, Zooey Deschanel, Sean Lennon, and more.

Radnor and Lee had known each other for "twelve or thirteen years after meeting on the set of How I Met Your Mother" eventually writing songs together. "We’d been talking about it, and then two and a half years ago we decided to write a song together and it went really well. We decided to write another one, then we said ‘let’s make a record,’ according to Radnor. It was their "shared interest in spirituality and philosophy" that inspired them make music together in the first place, with producer Ryan Dilmore referring to the pair as “singer-psalmwriters.” The two describe their vision for Radnor and Lee as "trying to write from the perspective of people who've had a little life under their belts... a different level of reflection and wisdom and humility... We make music that celebrates the complexity of where we're actually at in our lives."

=== Radnor and Lee (2017) ===
Yahoo! debuted the collaboration and first single "Be Like the Being" on May 8, 2017, calling the album "witty, hopeful, yearning, joyful, searching and meditative." AllMusic premiered "Doorstep" on August 8, 2017, saying "joyful spirituality abounds as their voices blend with layers of acoustic guitar and an organ." On August 14, 2017, Paste premiered the video for "Be Like the Being," a song Radnor said is "about simplicity, about knowing we have everything we need if we could just get out of our own way." In April 2018, Radnor and Lee announced an Australian East Coast Tour for May 2018 and appeared on Australia's Today show. Their single "Here" was featured in the American musical drama television series Rise in May 2018. Medium called it "The Best Spiritual Album I Have Ever Heard."

=== Golden State (2020) ===
In December 2019, Radnor told Us Weekly that Radnor and Lee were would be putting out their next album in 2020. On January 17, 2020, Radnor and Lee posted on social media that their new record would be out "soon" on Flower Moon Records, a Los Angeles-based record label owned and operated by Azure Ray's Maria Taylor.

On February 19, 2020, Spin announced the new album, Golden State would be out May 8, 2020 on Flower Moon Records and premiered the first single "Outside In." Of the album, Spin said: "Golden State is a bit darker lyrically than their self-titled album. The title refers more to a state of mind rather than California itself." On May 4, the band made an announcement via their official social media channels that due to the coronavirus, the album's release date would be pushed back. Days later, American Songwriter premiered the video for the album's 2nd single, "Simple Harmony," and announced a new release date of June 19, 2020. PopMatters premiered the album's "warm and catchy indie folk" single "Gimme Your Mess" on June 17, 2020.

== Members ==
- Josh Radnor – vocals, guitar
- Ben Lee – vocals, guitar

== Discography ==
- Radnor and Lee (Gold Village Entertainment, 2017)
- Golden State (Flower Moon Records, 2020)
