= Aaron Hillis =

American film critic

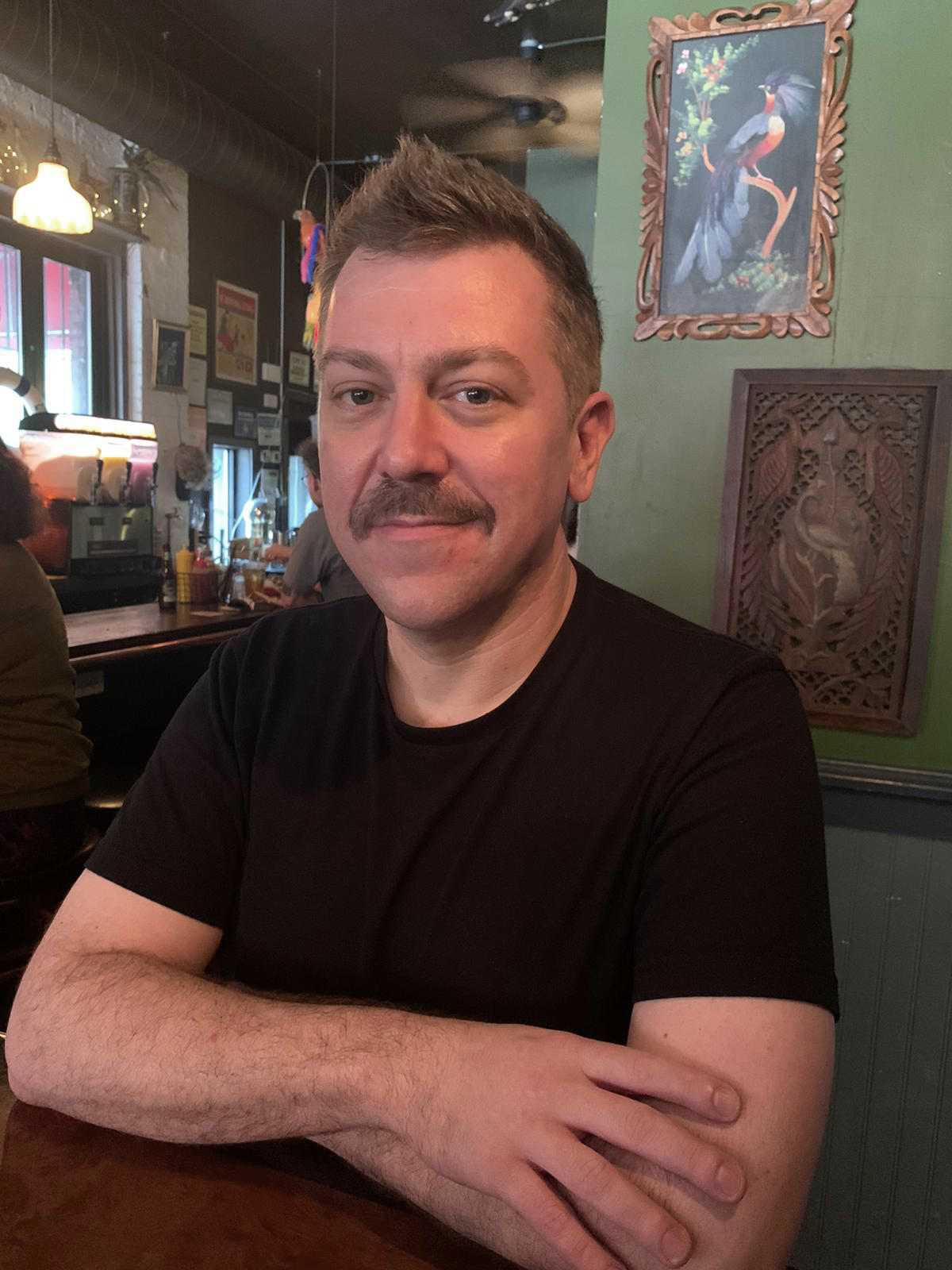
- Occupations: Film critic, writer, director, curator
- Known for: Film critic for The Village Voice

Aaron Hillis is an American writer, film critic, director and film festival programmer.

As of June 2026, he publishes a weekly newsletter ("The Secret Screening") and offers consulting for filmmakers.

== Career ==
Hillis has been active in independent film, especially within the fields of exhibition, festivals, distribution and programming, filmmaking, marketing, and journalism. As a film journalist, he has written film reviews and features articles and conducted hundreds of interviews with celebrities. He wrote, among others, for The Village Voice, Vice, Variety, Vanity Fair, LA Weekly, Indiewire, Filmmaker Magazine, GreenCine Daily (editor from 2009 to 2013), and Spin. Furthermore, Hillis is a frequent moderator of panels in the indie film world.

Between 2006 and 2009, Hillis was the vice-president of Benten Films, a boutique DVD label, founded by Andrew Grant. Responsible for acquisitions, art direction, disc production and marketing, releases include Joe Swanberg's LOL (2006), Aaron Katz's Dance Party USA and Quiet City (2007), Matthias Glasner's The Free Will (2008).

In 2007, Hillis co-directed the documentary feature Fish Kill Flea (with Brian M. Cassidy and Jennifer Loeber). The film premiered at SXSW where it was positively praised as "one of SXSW's pleasant surprises, with a great, early Errol Morris feel for American weirdness" (Premiere Magazine) and "a wistful, thought-provoking rumination on the cost of progress" (Film Threat).

Hillis is a senior programmer for the Cucalorus Film Festival (Wilmington, North Carolina), where he curates the adults-only "Convulsions" program he created in 2013. In 2025, Convulsions was voted one of the Top 40 genre programs in the world by Dread Central's panel of industry experts.

Between 2012 and 2018, Hillis owned Video Free Brooklyn, a DVD and Blu-ray rental boutique. The store was awarded the title of "Best Video Store in NYC" on three occasions between 2012–2013, by Time Out NY, The Village Voice, The L Magazine. In 2016, Hillis sold the library to the Alamo Drafthouse. The 2019 documentary At the Video Store by James Westby features a conversation with Hillis about his time as a video rental store owner.

From 2020 to 2025, Hillis curated and hosted "Playtime with Hillis," a Zoom screening series of rare cinema. Live on-camera guests included Paul Schrader, Alice Cooper, Steve Buscemi, Rian Johnson, "Weird Al" Yankovic, Robert Townsend, Heather Matarazzo, Joe Dante, Robyn Hitchcock, Guinevere Turner, Alessandro Nivola, and band Sparks.
