= Josh Radnor =

American actor and filmmaker (born 1974)

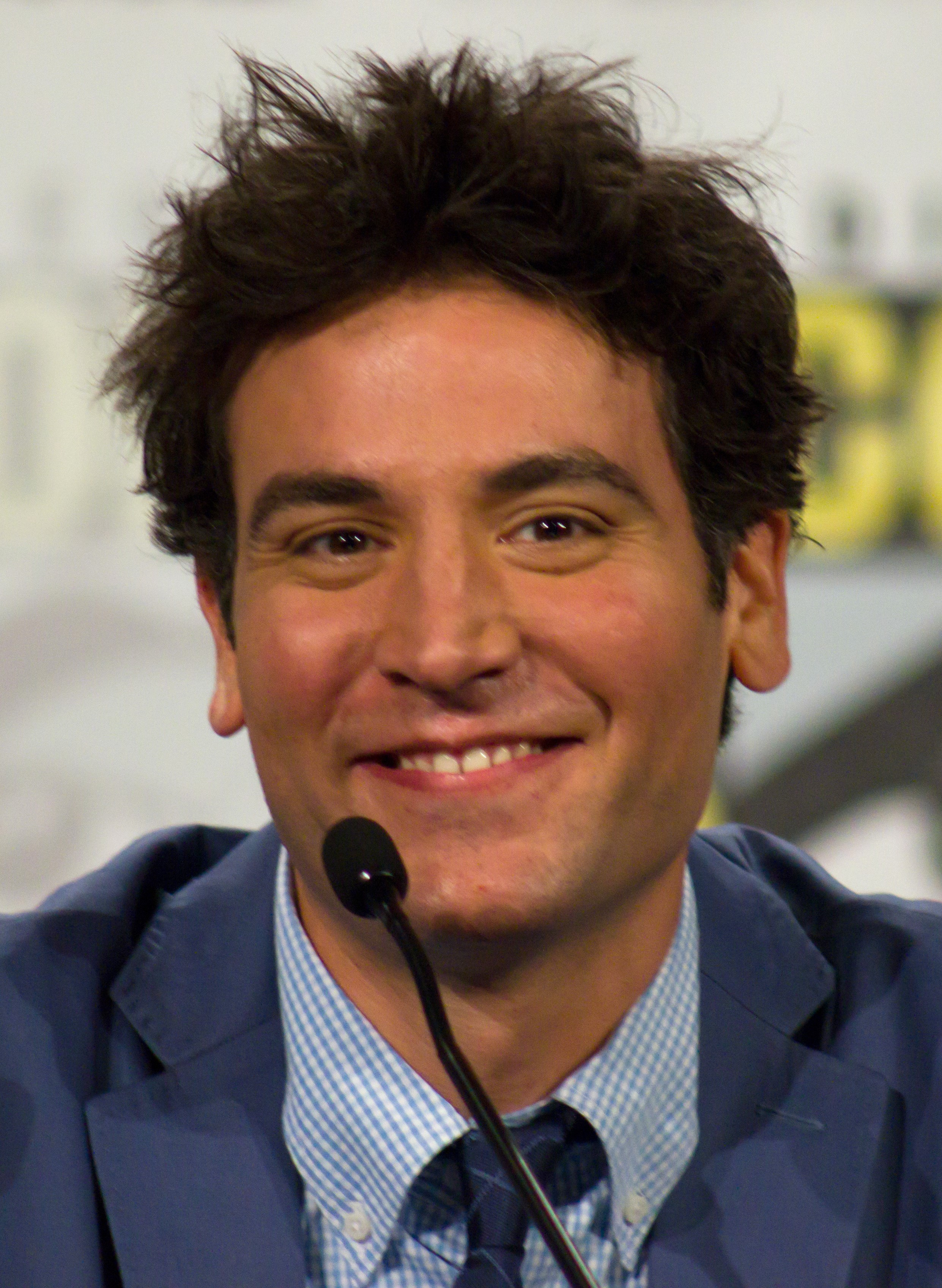
- Radnor at the 2013 Comic-Con Convention
- Born: Joshua Thomas Radnor; July 29, 1974 (age 52); Columbus, Ohio, U.S.
- Education: Kenyon College (BA); New York University (MFA)
- Occupations: Actor; filmmaker; musician
- Years active: 2000–present
- Spouse: Jordana Jacobs (m. 2024)
- Children: 1

Joshua Thomas Radnor (born July 29, 1974) is an American actor and filmmaker. He portrayed Ted Mosby on the Emmy Award–winning CBS sitcom How I Met Your Mother (2005–2014). He made his writing and directorial debut with the 2010 comedy drama film Happythankyoumoreplease, for which he won the Sundance Film Festival Audience Award and was nominated for the Grand Jury Prize.

In 2012, he wrote, directed and starred in his second film, Liberal Arts, which premiered at the 2012 Sundance Film Festival. In 2014, Radnor portrayed Isaac in the Broadway play Disgraced, which was nominated for the Tony Award for Best Play. He then starred as Dr. Jedediah Foster on the PBS American Civil War drama series Mercy Street, Lou Mazzuchelli in the musical series Rise, and as Lonny Flash in Hunters. In 2024, he returned to theater acting in the Itamar Moses play The Ally at The Public Theater.

== Early life, family and education ==
Radnor was born in Columbus, Ohio, to Carol Radnor (née Hirsch), a high school counselor, and Alan Radnor, a medical malpractice lawyer. Radnor and his two sisters were raised in Bexley, Ohio, a suburb of Columbus, and was raised in Conservative Judaism. He attended the Orthodox Jewish day school Columbus Torah Academy before attending Bexley High School.

While Radnor was a student at Kenyon College, his school's theater department presented him with the Paul Newman Award and during which he spent a semester (Spring 1995) training at the National Theater Institute at the Eugene O'Neill Theater Center in Waterford, Connecticut. He graduated from Kenyon with a Bachelor of Arts in drama in 1996.

After college, Radnor participated in an Israel experience program in Tzfat with Livnot U'Lehibanot in 1997. He subsequently enrolled in New York University's graduate acting program at the Tisch School of the Arts, earning a Master of Fine Arts degree.

== Career ==
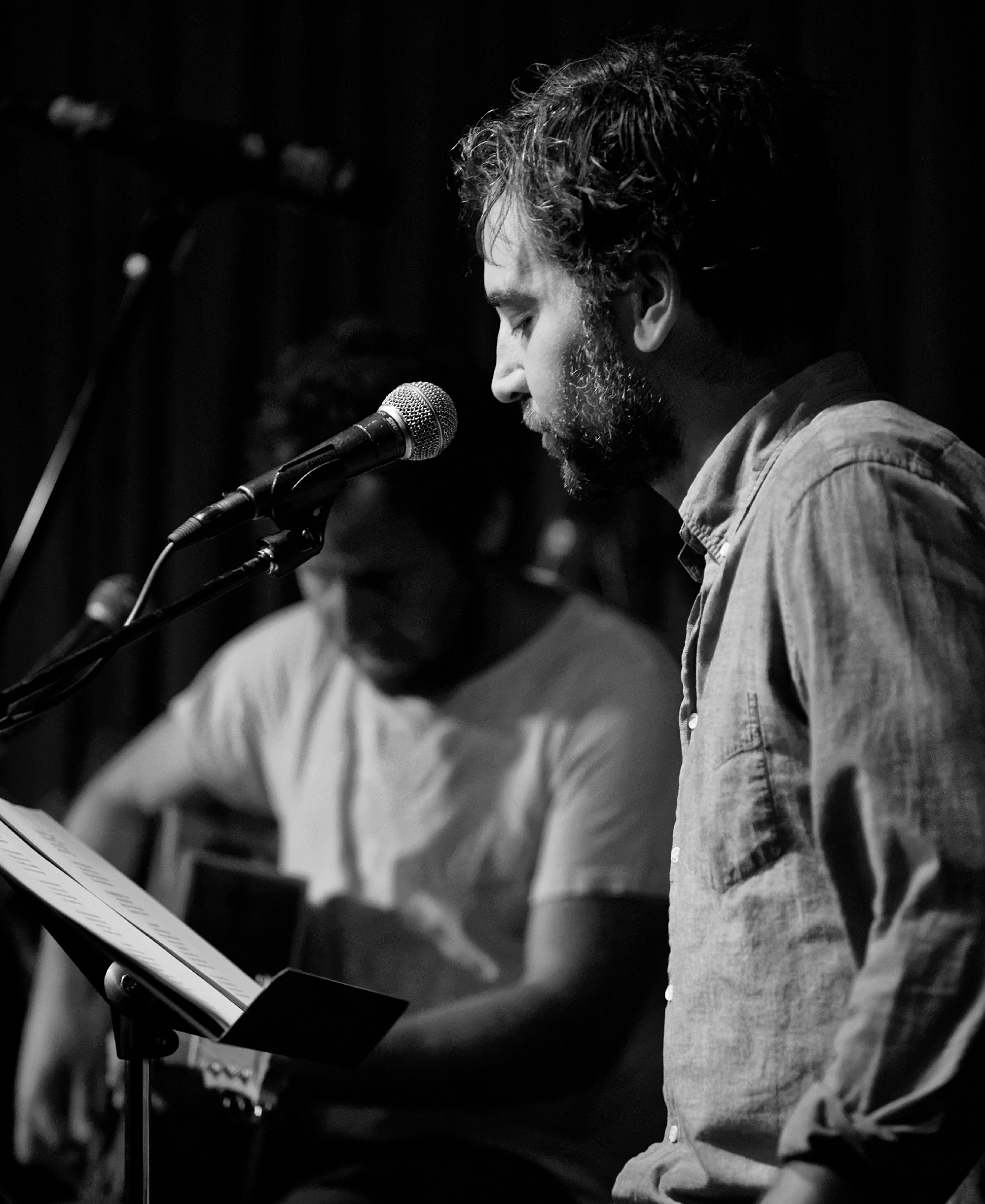
Radnor and Ben Lee performing

Radnor was cast as the lead in The WB series Off Centre. However, the role was re-cast with Eddie Kaye Thomas before the first episode aired. In 2002, he made his Broadway debut in the stage version of The Graduate, succeeding Jason Biggs, opposite Kathleen Turner and Alicia Silverstone. In 2004, Radnor starred in The Paris Letter alongside his future How I Met Your Mother co-star Neil Patrick Harris. From 2005 to 2014, Radnor starred as Ted Mosby in the CBS sitcom How I Met Your Mother, his biggest role to date. The series ran for nine seasons and revolved around friends living in New York City and finding love. He acted alongside Cobie Smulders, Neil Patrick Harris, Jason Segel, and Alyson Hannigan.

In July 2008, he starred opposite Jennifer Westfeldt in the premiere of the play Finks, written by Joe Gilford and directed by Charlie Stratton for New York Stage and Film. Radnor made his directorial debut with the film Happythankyoumoreplease, where he was both the writer and star of the 2010 comedy-drama. His second directorial effort, Liberal Arts, starring himself and Elizabeth Olsen, premiered at the Sundance Film Festival on January 22, 2012. Radnor appeared in the Broadway production of Disgraced, which opened October 23, 2014, at the Lyceum Theatre. He is set to direct the sci-fi thriller film The Leaves. From 2016 to 2017 he played Dr. Jedediah Foster in the historical medical drama Mercy Street on PBS.

In October 2016, Radnor also confirmed he is in a band, Radnor and Lee, with Australian musician Ben Lee. Radnor and Lee had known each other for "twelve or thirteen years after meeting on the set of How I Met Your Mother" eventually writing songs together. Their debut album, Radnor & Lee was released on November 10, 2017, "receiving widespread praise across the board, and cementing the duo as an accomplished pair of artists," stated Rolling Stone. On February 19, 2020, Spin announced Radnor and Lee's sophomore album, Golden State, out on Flower Moon Records, and premiered the first single "Outside In." American Songwriter later premiered the video for the album's 2nd single, "Simple Harmony." Due to the COVID-19 pandemic, the album's release date was pushed back to June 2020. Radnor's debut solo EP, One More Then I'll Let You Go, was released on April 16, 2021, on Flower Moon Records. Rolling Stone premiered the first single, "The High Road," March 10, 2021, calling it a "gently lilting ballad about the breakdown of a friendship on which he sings... which features deep textures of piano, acoustic guitar, organ, and snapping fingers." The EP's 2nd single, "You Feel New," premiered on March 31, 2021, with features in Rolling Stone, NPR, American Songwriter and Paste Magazine.

From 2020 to 2023, he starred as Lonny Flash in the Amazon Prime series Hunters, acting alongside Logan Lerman and Al Pacino. He voiced Durpleton in the Netflix animated series Centaurworld (2021). He took a recurring role as Adam one of the protagonists friends, in the FX on Hulu limited series Fleishman Is in Trouble (2022). He acted alongside Jesse Eisenberg, Lizzy Caplan, and Adam Brody. The series went on to receive a nomination for the Primetime Emmy Award for Outstanding Limited or Anthology Series. In 2024 Radnor returned to theatre starring in the Itamar Moses play The Ally directed by Lila Neugebauer at The Public Theater. In 2026, Radnor made his London theatre debut in Jonathan Caren's 2025 play, Hit Machine. The production received mixed reviews from critics, while Radnor's performance was generally praised.

== Personal life ==
In 2008, Radnor told the Los Angeles Times, "I do Transcendental Meditation, and part of the reason I chose my house is that I thought it would be a great place to meditate."

Radnor began dating psychologist Jordana Jacobs in 2022 after meeting at a meditation retreat in upstate New York. They married in January 2024. In February 2026, they announced they had welcomed their first child, a boy, a "few months" prior.

Radnor is an avid fan of the indie rock band Cloud Cult. He collaborated with the band to make the film The Seeker in 2016. Radnor explained, "What's true for me about a lot of music, but especially true for Cloud Cult's music, is that it stirs up the thing that's already in you and calls it out. If this film is able to do that, I'll sleep well at night."

== Filmography ==
Key
†	Denotes productions that have not yet been released

=== Film ===
Year	Title	Role	Notes
2001	Not Another Teen Movie	Tour Guide	
2008	The Negotiating Table	WGA Negotiator	Short film
2010	Happythankyoumoreplease	Sam Wexler	Also director and writer
2012	Liberal Arts	Jesse Fisher	Also director, writer and producer
2013	Afternoon Delight	Jeff	
2013	The Galapagos Affair: Satan Came to Eden	John Garth (voice)	Documentary
2016	The Seeker	Father	Also executive producer
2018	Social Animals	Paul	
2023	Three Birthdays	Rob	
2024	All Happy Families	Graham Landry	

=== Television ===
Year	Title	Role	Notes
2000	Welcome to New York	Doug	Episode: "The Crier"
2001	Off Centre	Mike Platt	Unaired pilot
2002	Law & Order	Robert Kitson	Episode: "Access Nation"
2002	The Court	Dylan Hirsch	3 episodes
2003	ER	Keith	Episode: "The Advocate"
2003	Six Feet Under	Will Jaffe	Episode: "The Trap"
2003	Miss Match	Andrew Gilbert	Episode: "I Got You Babe"
2005	Judging Amy	Justin Barr	Episode: "Too Little, Too Late"
2005–14	How I Met Your Mother	Ted Mosby	Main role (208 episodes)
2007, 2009	Family Guy	Ted Mosby (voice)	Episodes: "No Chris Left Behind" "Peter's Progress"
2013	Malviviendo	Himself/cameo	Episode: "La cosa está muy negra"
2016–17	Mercy Street	Dr. Jedediah Foster	Main role (12 episodes)
2018	Rise	Lou Mazzuchelli	Main role (10 episodes)
2018	Grey's Anatomy	John	Episode: "Momma Knows Best"
2020–23	Hunters	Lonny Flash	Main role (18 episodes)
2021	Centaurworld	Durpleton (voice)	Main role (18 episodes)
2022	Fleishman Is in Trouble	Adam	Recurring (5 Episodes)

=== Music videos ===
Year	Title	Artist	Notes
2016	"Let Me Be Your Girl"	Rachael Yamagata	Director
2017	"Be Like the Being"	Radnor and Lee	Director
2021	"Afternoon"	Cinders	Director

=== Theatre ===
Year	Title	Role	Location	Ref.
2002	The Graduate	Benjamin Braddock	Plymouth Theatre, Broadway	
2004	The Paris Letter	Sam Arlen / Young Sandy	Kirk Douglas Theater	
2011	She Loves Me	Georg Nowack	Stephen Sondheim Theatre, Broadway	
2014–2015	Disgraced	Isaac	Lyceum Theatre, Broadway	
2016	The Babylon Line	Aaron Port	Lincoln Center Theatre	
2018	Little Shop of Horrors	Seymour Krelborn	Kennedy Center	
2024	The Ally	Asaf	The Public Theater	
2026	Hit Machine	Wes	Soho Theatre	

== Awards and nominations ==
Year	Association	Category	Project	Result	Ref.
2010	Sundance Film Festival	Audience Award	Happythankyoumoreplease	Won	
2010	Sundance Film Festival	Grand Jury Award	Happythankyoumoreplease	Nominated	
2011	Georgia Film Critics Association	Breakthrough Award	Happythankyoumoreplease	Nominated	
2013	Midwest Independent Film Festival	Best Feature	Liberal Arts	Won	
2013	Midwest Independent Film Festival	Best Director	Liberal Arts	Won	
2013	Midwest Independent Film Festival	Best Actor	Liberal Arts	Nominated	
2013	Midwest Independent Film Festival	Best Screenplay	Liberal Arts	Nominated	
2014	People's Choice Awards	Favorite TV Bromance (with Jason Segel and Neil Patrick Harris)	How I Met Your Mother	Nominated	
2024	Lucille Lortel Awards	Outstanding Lead Performer in a Play	The Ally	Nominated	

== Discography ==
=== Radnor and Lee ===
- Radnor and Lee (2017, Gold Village Entertainment)
- Golden State (2020, Flower Moon Records)

=== Solo ===
- One More Then I'll Let You Go (2021, Flower Moon Records)
- Eulogy, Vol. I (2023, Optimal Grip)
- Eulogy, Vol. II (2024, Optimal Grip)

=== Additional appearances ===
- Paty Cantú & Josh Radnor – "Mirame" (2020, Universal Music Mexico)
