= Josh Mandel (disambiguation) =

Josh Mandel (born 1977) is an American politician from Ohio.

Josh Mandel may also refer to:

- Josh Mandel (video game designer) (born 1958), American writer and designer of computer games
- Josh Mandel, co-producer of Thirst Street
