= C. Mason Wells =

American filmmaker

- Occupations: Writer, Film Programmer
- Years active: 2006–present

C. Mason Wells (born March 8, 1984) is an American screenwriter and film programmer working out of New York City. He has written screenplays for Joe Swanberg, Alex Ross Perry, Nathan Silver and Aaron Katz.

== Career ==
In 2006 Wells wrote the feature film LOL with Kevin Bewersdorf and Joe Swanberg. Swanberg would go on to direct the film. Shortly thereafter Wells co-wrote the scripts for the films Quiet City by Aaron Katz and The Color Wheel by Alex Ross Perry.

Wells worked as a programmer at the IFC Center for several years before becoming the Director of Repertory Programming at the iconic Quad Cinema in New York City after its revitalization. In 2019 he joined the team at the film distribution company Kino Lorber as the director of theatrical sales before becoming the director of distribution at the streaming service and distribution company MUBI.

In 2023, Wells co-wrote the script for Between the Temples with director Nathan Silver. The film went into production that year. It is a comedy starring Jason Schwartzman and Carol Kane and it follows the story of a neurotic cantor and an adult bat mitzvah student. The film premiered at the 2024 Sundance Film Festival to critical acclaim. It went on to play the 2024 Berlin International Film Festival and was acquired up for distribution by Sony Pictures Classics.

== Filmography ==
Year	Title	Writer	Director	Actor
2006	LOL	Yes	No	Yes
2007	Quiet City	No	No	Yes
2011	The Color Wheel	No	No	Yes
2012	Leaves	Yes	No	Yes
2013	Judy Judy Judy	Yes	Yes	No
2017	Thirst Street	Yes	No	No
2018	The Great Pretender	No	No	Yes
2019	Fourteen	No	No	Yes
2023	The Prima Donna	Yes	No	No
2024	Between the Temples	Yes	No	No
2024	A Different Man	No	No	Yes
