= Between the Temples =

2024 film by Nathan Silver

- Theatrical release poster
- Directed by: Nathan Silver
- Written by: C. Mason Wells; Nathan Silver
- Produced by: Tim Headington; Theresa Steele Page; Nate Kamiya; Adam Kersh; Taylor Hess
- Starring: Jason Schwartzman; Carol Kane; Caroline Aaron; Robert Smigel; Madeline Weinstein; Matthew Shear; Dolly de Leon
- Cinematography: Sean Price Williams
- Edited by: John Magary
- Production companies: Ley Line Entertainment; Fusion Entertainment
- Distributed by: Sony Pictures Classics
- Release dates: January 19, 2024 (Sundance); August 23, 2024 (United States)
- Running time: 111 minutes
- Country: United States
- Language: English
- Box office: $2.3 million

Between the Temples is a 2024 American comedy-drama film directed by Nathan Silver and written by Silver and C. Mason Wells. The film stars Jason Schwartzman, Carol Kane, Caroline Aaron, Robert Smigel, Madeline Weinstein, Matthew Shear, and Dolly de Leon.

Between the Temples premiered at the 2024 Sundance Film Festival on January 19, 2024, and was released in the United States by Sony Pictures Classics on August 23, 2024 to positive reviews from critics. For her performance, Kane won the New York Film Critics Circle Award for Best Supporting Actress and received a nomination for Best Supporting Performance at the 40th Independent Spirit Awards.

== Plot ==
Over a year after his wife, Ruth, died after slipping on a patch of ice, cantor Ben Gottlieb is suffering a crisis of faith, and is unable to sing. He moves back in with his mothers, Meira and Judith. After getting into a fight at a bar, Ben encounters Carla Kessler, who was his music teacher in elementary school. The next day, Carla comes to one of Ben's classes for boys and girls preparing for their bar and bat mitzvahs. Carla says that she has always wanted a bat mitzvah, but her parents, who were communists, did not allow her to have one when she turned 13. Ben agrees to teach Carla and gets a ceremony approved by Bruce, the synagogue's rabbi.

As they become friendly, Ben brings a tape of his own bar mitzvah to Carla's house to watch on her VCR. Carla's friend accidentally gives drugged tea to Ben and Carla, and Ben hallucinates interactions with his younger self. Carla lets him sleep in her son Nat's bed. Ben has been suffering from insomnia since Ruth's death, but he sleeps comfortably in Nat's bed. Nat and his family visit the next day. The family and Ben go out to dinner, but when Carla announces her intention to have a bat mitzvah, Nat objects. He explains that he is an atheist, and thus he objects to any of his other family members participating in the bat mitzvah, although his wife and two young daughters are supportive of Carla and express interest in helping her.

Judith and Meira have been trying to set up Ben with women, preferably Jewish. These include Bruce's daughter, Gabby, who reads a book Ruth wrote and is excited by its sexual nature. She meets Ben near Ruth's grave and professes her attraction to him; they subsequently have sex.

Carla has a stroke. Nat does not visit her in the hospital, but Ben does. Ben presses Bruce to move Carla's ceremony up to the upcoming weekend. In anticipation of the ceremony, Ben invites Carla to the Gottliebs' Shabbat meal; Bruce, his wife, and Gabby also attend the meal.

At the Shabbat meal, Ben announces that he is in love with Carla. Gabby begins crying uncontrollably. As Bruce and Judith lambast Ben, Carla flees and Meira encourages Ben to go after her. Ben does, but slips on ice and injures his head outside Carla's house. Carla takes Ben inside and treats his wound. He stays at her house that night. Recalling Carla's memory that the first bat mitzvah was performed in 1922 in a home, Ben performs the ceremony the next day in the backyard of Carla's house, and sings with her while she chants her Torah reading.

== Cast ==
- Jason Schwartzman as Ben Gottlieb
  - Jacob Morrell as Young Ben Gottlieb
- Carol Kane as Carla Kessler
- Dolly de Leon as Judith Gottlieb
- Caroline Aaron as Meira Gottlieb
- Robert Smigel as Rabbi Bruce
- Madeline Weinstein as Gabby / Ruth
- Matthew Shear as Nat
- Lindsay Burdge as Darcy
- Annie Hamilton as Dr. Rachel Plotnik
- Pauline Chalamet as Leah
- Steven Lack as Mildred's owner
- Diane Lanyi as Cindy (Rabbi Bruce's wife)
- Jason Grisell as Priest

== Production ==
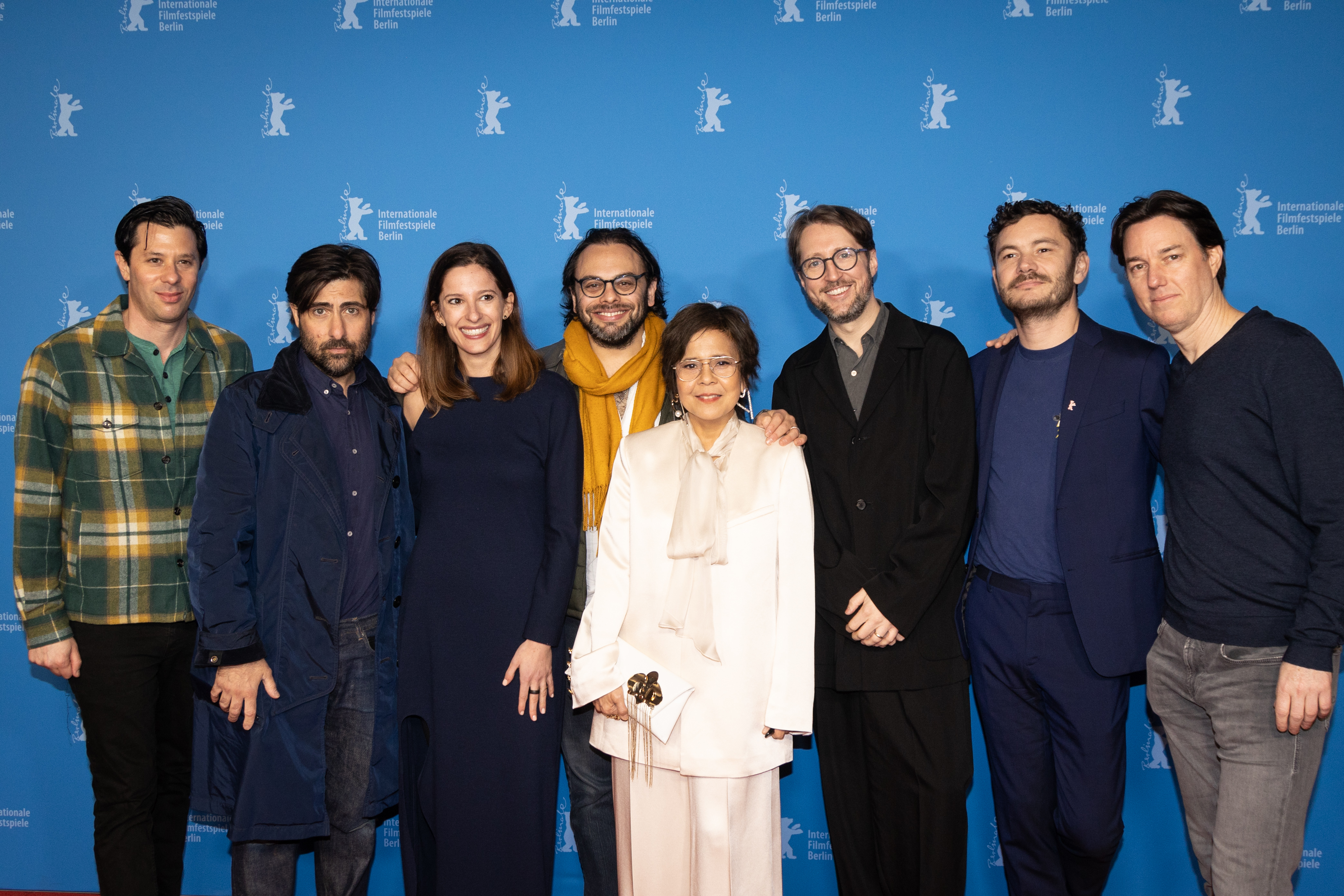
Cast and crew of the film at the Berlinale 2024.

In May 2023, Schwartzman, Kane, and De Leon were confirmed to be starring in the film. Also in the confirmed cast were Caroline Aaron, Robert Smigel, Madeline Weinstein and Matthew Shear. It is produced by Ley Line Entertainment and Fusion Entertainment with producers Tim Headington, Theresa Steele Page, Nate Kamiya, Adam Kersh and Taylor Hess. Principal photography wrapped in early 2023, and filming locations included Kingston, New York.

== Release ==
The film premiered in the U.S. Dramatic Competition at the 2024 Sundance Film Festival on January 19, 2024. In February, Sony Pictures Classics acquired distribution rights to the film. It also screened at the 74th Berlin International Film Festival in the Panorama section. It was also added to the 2024 Tribeca Film Festival lineup, which ran in New York City from June 5–16, 2024. It was released theatrically on August 23, 2024.

A screening for students and alumni majoring in Film & Media at the Fashion Institute of Technology in New York City took place on November 12, 2024, followed by a Q&A with Silver moderated by FIT Film and Media chair Dahlia Schweitzer.

=== Home media ===
It was released onto VOD platforms on September 24, 2024, and on DVD on November 12, by Sony Pictures Home Entertainment. It began streaming on Netflix on December 21, 2024.

== Reception ==
=== Box office ===
In the United States and Canada, the film made $647,757 from 576 theaters in its opening weekend.

=== Critical response ===
On the review aggregator website Rotten Tomatoes, 85% of 119 critics' reviews are positive, with an average rating of 7.1/10. The website's consensus reads: "Immeasurably elevated by the chemistry between Carol Kane and Jason Schwartzman, Between the Temples uses engrossing, character-driven dramedy to explore deeply relatable aspects of the human experience." Metacritic, which uses a weighted average, assigned the film a score of 83 out of 100, based on 30 critics, indicating "universal acclaim".

Critics have compared the filmmaking and themes to that of the works of Woody Allen, Hal Ashby, and John Cassavetes. Filmmakers Whit Stillman, Lena Dunham, India Donaldson, Miguel Gomes, and Tyler Taormina cited it as among their favorite films of 2024.

In June 2025, IndieWire ranked the film at number 89 on its list of "The 100 Best Movies of the 2020s (So Far)."

=== Accolades ===
Award	Date of ceremony	Category	Nominee(s)	Result	Ref.
Sundance Film Festival	January 26, 2024	Grand Jury Prize – U.S. Dramatic	Between the Temples	Nominated	
Berlin International Film Festival	February 25, 2024	Panorama Audience Award – Best Feature Film	Between the Temples	Nominated	
Berlin International Film Festival	February 25, 2024	Teddy Award – Best Feature Film	Between the Temples	Nominated	
Champs-Élysées Film Festival	June 26, 2024	Prix du jury	Between the Temples	Nominated	
Champs-Élysées Film Festival	June 26, 2024	Prix de la critique	Between the Temples	Won	
Champs-Élysées Film Festival	June 26, 2024	Best Director	Nathan Silver	Won	
Gotham Awards	December 2, 2024	Best Screenplay	C. Mason Wells and Nathan Silver	Nominated	
New York Film Critics Circle Awards	December 3, 2024	Best Supporting Actress	Carol Kane	Won	
Independent Spirit Awards	February 22, 2025	Best Supporting Performance	Carol Kane	Nominated	
