= Actor Martinez =

- Directed by: Mike Ott; Nathan Silver
- Written by: Mike Ott; Nathan Silver
- Produced by: Britta Erickson; Katie Shapiro; Patrick Hackett; Heika Burnison
- Starring: Arthur Martinez
- Cinematography: Adam J. Minnick
- Edited by: Gerald D. Rossini
- Music by: Nicole Arbusto
- Production company: Mary Jane Films
- Distributed by: Breaking Glass Pictures
- Release dates: January 28, 2016 (IFFR); March 10, 2017 (United States)
- Running time: 75 minutes
- Country: United States
- Language: English

Actor Martinez is a 2016 American mockumentary film written and directed by Mike Ott and Nathan Silver and starring Arthur Martinez.

== Premise ==
Independent film directors Mike Ott and Nathan Silver are hired by Arthur Martinez, a Denver computer repairman and would-be actor, to make a film starring Arthur as a fictionalized version of himself.

== Cast ==
- Arthur Martinez as Arthur
- Lindsay Burdge as Lindsay
- Mike Ott as Mike
- Nathan Silver as Nathan
- Kenneth Berba as Kenneth
- Rae Radka as Rae
- Sarah Sansoni as Casting Call Featured Extra
- Andy Hankins as Extra
- Connor Long as Tech Appointment Featured Extra
- Bobby Black as Bobby
- Sanaz Fatemi as Casting Call Featured Extra
- Cindy Silver as Cindy
- Cory Zacharia as Cory
- Allie Escaffi as Meeting Participant
- Aaron Kenneth Myers as Featured Extra

== Release ==
Actor Martinez premiered at the International Film Festival Rotterdam on January 28, 2016. Its North American premiere was held at the Tribeca Film Festival on April 14, 2016. It was released in select theaters on March 10, 2017.

== Reception ==
The film has an 82% rating on Rotten Tomatoes based on 17 reviews.

Guy Lodge of Variety gave the film a positive review and wrote, "Narrative and reality clash, tussle, and are eventually rendered indistinguishable in a witty, tortured puzzle picture..."

Ignatiy Vishnevetsky of The A.V. Club graded the film a B−, calling it a "funny, low-key head-scratcher..."

Charles Bramesco of Uproxx gave the film a positive review and wrote, "Actor Martinez is more like a dense work of film criticism that plays like a movie, and an enjoyable one at that."

Frank Scheck of The Hollywood Reporter gave the film a negative review and wrote, "Actor Martinez raises plenty of questions. The problem is that none of them are particularly interesting."

Chuck Bowen of Slant Magazine awarded the film three and a half stars out of four and wrote, "Mike Ott and Nathan Silver's Actor Martinez has a ghostly, tremulous quality that's bound to get under the skin."

Marjorie Baumgarten of The Austin Chronicle awarded the film two stars out of five and wrote, "Everyone involved in Actor Martinez deserves kudos for the effort, but the unengaging result would be better chalked up to a failed experiment rather than shared with others in theatrical settings."

Andy Webster of The New York Times gave the film a positive review and wrote, "The self-references here, while intriguing, approach a comic navel-gaze. "Actor Martinez" has a saving grace, however: Ms. Burdge, radiating her customary charisma."

Kimber Myers of the Los Angeles Times gave the film a positive review and wrote, "Don't let the low-res, low-budget filmmaking fool you. Actor Martinez is an ambitious film that works on a variety of levels."

Jason Bailey of Flavorwire gave the film a positive review and wrote, "Fascinatingly, the film keeps working its way around to the very questions we're asking of it, and bouncing up against its own boundaries in ways that are either reflective or indulgent, or maybe both."
