= LOL (2006 film) =

2006 film by Joe Swanberg

- Directed by: Joe Swanberg
- Written by: Kevin Bewersdorf; Joe Swanberg; C. Mason Wells
- Produced by: Joe Swanberg
- Starring: Kevin Bewersdorf; Joe Swanberg; C. Mason Wells; Tipper Newton; Brigid Reagan; Greta Gerwig; Kate Winterich
- Cinematography: Joe Swanberg
- Edited by: Joe Swanberg
- Music by: Kevin Bewersdorf
- Distributed by: Washington Square Films
- Release date: August 23, 2006
- Running time: 81 minutes
- Language: English
- Budget: $5,000

LOL is a 2006 independent mumblecore film by Joe Swanberg that examines the impact of technology on social relations. It is an improvised film that premiered in 2006 at the South By Southwest Film Festival and was later released on DVD.

== Plot ==
The movie follows three recent college graduates in Chicago: Tim, Chris and Alex. Tim watches the screen of his laptop as he makes out with his girlfriend. Chris conducts relationships by cellphone. Alex's preoccupation with chat rooms sabotages a potential face-to-face relationship with a girl he meets at a party.

Videos called "noisehead" appear throughout the film. Within the film, the character Alex takes videos of people making noises and then edits those videos into music videos.

== Production ==
Swanberg first thought of making the film in the summer of 2005, originally knowing that he wanted to direct a film that was based on relationships and technology although he had no ideas beyond that. With the help of his friend Chris Wells, they originally thought of creating a DVD that showed scenes at random and in a different order every viewing. During the filming, Swanberg and Wells came up with the film's plot.

Kevin Bewersdorf, who starred in the film, also created all of the film's soundtrack and produced the "noisehead" videos which are interspersed throughout the film. Everything in the film was improvised and the plot had to be continually adjusted as the project progressed. Swanberg was the film's producer, director, editor, DP, and writer. He also had a role in the film and his friends were fine with working without compensation. Greta Gerwig was Wells' actual girlfriend.

The two influences for the film were the comedians Larry David and Ricky Gervais. LOL was produced with a budget of $3,000 and it first premiered at the South By Southwest Film Festival in 2006.

== Reception ==
Dennis Schwartz gave the film a B rating and wrote, "The actors were allowed to ad lib, and the result is that the characters talk like real people, it's keenly observant about social issues and offers a flippant comical look at relationships for the social media set."

Phil Bacharach of DVD Talk wrote, "LOL might be undermined by its overly relaxed aesthetic, but it absolutely nails how improved tools of communication don't translate into improved communication."

Scott Weinberg, in an eFilmCritic review wrote, "Stocked with low-key and entirely believable characters and a sly (but not nasty) sense of derision towards the modern tools that keep us apart, LOL is, by my estimation, a solid step up from the director's first flick, and I feel pretty confident that the guy has something even better lined up for his next outing."

== Home media ==
The film was released on DVD by Benten Films, in Dolby Digital 2.0 and full-frame 1.33:1, with liner notes from GreenCine Daily editor David Hudson. The DVD has two commentaries as special features, with one that features the filmmakers and another one that has to do with the acting. Podcasts by Bewersdorf, the complete "Noisehead" videos, a casting interview of Tipper Newton, a short video titled Hissy Fits, a slideshow of the film's artwork, and music performances round out the rest of the special features.
