= Swim Little Fish Swim =

- Theatrical release poster
- Directed by: Ruben Amar; Lola Bessis
- Written by: Ruben Amar; Lola Bessis
- Produced by: Ruben Amar; Lola Bessis
- Starring: Dustin Guy Defa; Brooke Bloom; Lola Bessis; Anne Consigny; Olivia Durling Costello
- Cinematography: Brett Jutkiewicz
- Edited by: Thomas Marchand
- Music by: Toys and Tiny Instruments, Penn Sultan & Candace Lee Camacho
- Production company: PaperMoon Films
- Distributed by: Under The Milky Way
- Release dates: March 11, 2013 (SXSW); June 4, 2014 (France); September 19, 2014 (United States)
- Running time: 95 minutes
- Countries: United States; France
- Languages: English; French
- Budget: €0.3 million
- Box office: US$203,877

Swim Little Fish Swim is a 2013 French-American indie comedy-drama written, produced and co-directed by Lola Bessis and Ruben Amar.

This film was shot in New York on a shoe-string budget. Once finished, it hit the festival circuit (Rotterdam; São Paulo; Jerusalem; Durban; CPH:PIX) after premiering at South by Southwest (SXSW) in 2013. Swim Little Fish Swim enjoyed a worldwide theatrical release and it has recently been sold to HBO Europe, Netflix, RTBF and OCS among other international networks.

== Cast ==
- Dustin Guy Defa as Leeward
- Brooke Bloom as Mary
- Lola Bessis as Lilas
- Olivia Durling Costello as Maggie
- Anne Consigny as Françoise de Castillon

== Critical reception ==
- "Refreshingly free of cliches." - The Hollywood Reporter
- Indiewire's Eric Kohn praised the film, describing it as "a gentle NYC delight" and giving it a B+ grade.
- "An elegance of construction scarcely seen in like-minded indie comedies." - MTV
- "Featuring gorgeous photography, solid performances and an absolutely killer soundtrack." - CriterionCast
- "What comes through strongest is its Woody Allen-esque treatment of Brooklyn, complete with golden light, beautiful young women, glamorous locations and plenty of appealingly tortured—or insufferably neurotic, depending on your point of view—artists." - Slant Magazine
- "Inspired by John Cassavettes and the Nouvelle Vague's observations of human beings and Jacques Demy's charming atmosphere." The Red List
