= Drowning (play) =

Play by María Irene Fornés

Drowning is a short play by María Irene Fornés. It was created as one of seven plays during the mid-1980’s based on short stories written by Anton Chekhov. Fornés used his story as the framework upon which she built. Alongside Drowning Fornés also created her play Mud. Though both plays were not meant to be performed together, they were presented in modern syndication to portray the human consciousness dealing with self-awareness. At its core, Drowning shows the essence of Fornés’ work with a sense of alienation and her unique adaptive style. As stated in John Houseman’s foreword of Orchards, the collection of the seven plays, "The idea was not simply to adapt or dramatize the stories, but to use them as a cue for the creation of short theatrical pieces to be produced by the Company as part of its repertory season."

The idea for Drowning, when originally assigned to Fornés, was almost sent back because she felt that there was not enough of a story since there were only two or three pages of material to work with. Chekhov’s version of the story follows a man who makes a living by pretending to drown himself in front of wealthy clients for money. Even though Fornés did not understand the meaning behind the man drowning himself, she drew inspiration from the man’s loneliness and from having complete creative freedom to adapt the story as she wanted to. Fornés decided to turn the story into a short play about tragic love. In her adaptation of the story the main actors are wearing animal-like masks that resembled sea lions and heavily padded clothing to simulate the appearance of two grotesque men. The story would be viewed through the eyes of two patrons in the café watching the transition of the man as he falls in love with a woman in a newspaper photograph; the man consequently falls into a deep depression, which leads to him drowning himself with grief.

== Production history ==
Drowning was originally performed as part of the Off-Off Broadway Theatre company in New York City as part of the avant-garde movement of the 1960s. It is currently one of eight plays being rehearsed and presented by The Acting Company. According to Houseman in his foreword of Orchards, the play has "appeared in thirty-four cities, where in many cases audiences had their first opportunity to see works by the seven playwrights." Drowning was also performed at Pershing Square Signature Center, directed by Lila Neugebauer.

== Characters ==
- Pea: One of the large and shapeless humanoids who wears an olive hat, a beige jacket, and greenish-brown pants. He falls in love with the woman in the newspaper and ultimately becomes dejected when she rejects him.
- Roe: The other humanoid. He wears a brown hat and brown suit. He enlightens Pea on a variety of subjects with which the latter is unfamiliar.
- Stephen: another humanoid. He is adorned with a brown hat, small checkered jacket, and brown pants. Notably, Stephen only has a single line in the play.

"Humanoid" is simply a term to refer quickly to the characters, who, although they are not given specific labels, are described by Fornés in Scene 1. In Fornés’ description of Pea and Roe, she describes their heads as "large and shapeless, like potatoes." She goes on, stating: "Their flesh is shiny and oily. Their eyes are reddish and watery. They have warts on their faces and necks. Their bodies are also like potatoes."

== Plot ==
Drowning is made up of only three scenes. It is a relatively short play.

=== Scene 1 ===
Pea and Roe sit in a cafe in Europe during the afternoon. They are sitting at a table, waiting for Stephen. On the table lies a folded newspaper. When Pea looks at it, he and Roe begin a dialogue about the paper, with Pea having not previously known what a newspaper is. Roe, the more knowledgeable one, informs his friend what it is. Pea spots the picture of a woman in the paper and a snowdrift and asks Roe what these things are. After defining what snow is, Roe then points to a snowman in the paper for the benefit of Pea. Pea is confused about what word to use for the snowman, at first describing it as "awkward," and then, after Roe differs, saying he meant to say "strikingly wonderful" and "very well-made." Pea is additionally confused about how the snowman is not a real man. Roe corrects him, saying that "he is an imitation of a man." This ultimately leads Pea to question his own identity and what he is made of, as well as what Roe and the woman in the paper are made of.

Pea decides he wants to meet the woman in the paper. Roe says her name is Jane Spivak. He knows her, but is uncertain if he would be able to introduce her to Pea.

Stephen arrives.

=== Scene 2 ===
A few minutes after Scene 1 takes place. Pea, whose head is leaning on the table, is sleeping. Stephen and Roe talk about how Pea could not harm anyone and how they hope no harm comes to him.

=== Scene 3 ===
A month later. Pea is in the same seat, his shirt collar open and hat pushed back. He looks as if he has not slept well. Roe stands. Pea talks about all the qualities of Jane Spivak which he adores. He describes looking at her "as one looks at an animal." He says that he loves her. Pea then laments how he looks, saying that he is a bat rather than a human. He tells Roe of the meeting with Jane Spivak. According to Pea, she had invited him to touch her, and when he did, she pushed him away and said, "You rub against me like a piece of meat." She then told him not to rub against her anymore.

Roe sympathizes with his friend. He touches Pea and says he is cold. He says how terrible it is to see such a young man destroyed and suffering like this. Pea takes out the newspaper from earlier from his jacket. He had thought having her picture would provide him with relief, but now sees that it does not provide relief. He puts his head on the table and questions why they came to live, love and hurt.

Roe puts his hand on Pea’s back. Stephen enters and looks at Roe. Roe says, "He’s drowning. He hurts too much."

== Reception ==
Two well-known articles on Drowning are by Michael Feingold and John Simon. According to Feingold’s article "Entertainment Centering," Drowning’s ending was an achievement because of the cohesive work between both the author and director. His review, however, is refuted according to John Simon’s "Upside Down" where he expresses his distaste for the short play by calling it "Totally nonsensical and certifiably affectless."

David Sheward, an author for the website Cultural Weekly, shares the same perspective as Simon when he comments about actor Mikeah Ernest Jennings’ role as Pea, saying, "It doesn’t help that there is a dull nine-minute pause to change scenery between the Albee and Fornes pieces filled with only an actor (Nicholas Bruder) listening to a radio."

Peter Marks, in his New York Times review, describes Pea and Roe as "at once eerie and gorgeous, the gelatinous mounds of flesh that feel the pain of rejection so deeply…" He goes on to describe them as "tuskless walruses that have evolved into bipeds."

In Pete Hempstead’s review on TheaterMania, Hempstead talks of Pea and Roa, "two humanoid characters," and the issue of body politics. Drowning, according to Hempstead, while offering only occasional moments of laughter, "swims in comparatively calm waters." He goes on to reflect on how we as viewers might relate to the characters: "At first we feel that these oddly shaped beings, with their lethargic conversation and sloth-like movements, don't have much in common with us — until we see a tear in Pea's eye."

== Political Significance ==
In the journal article, Subversive Acts: Gender, Representation, and race in contemporary feminist theatre, Raima Evan of the University of Pennsylvania explores popular and little-known plays as they relate to contemporary feminism, and how the writers of these plays "invoke the invisible in order to disrupt a dominant discourse invested in aligning women and ‘minorities’ with the visible, silent, abject body." Fornés is among the writers, and specifically, her play, Drowning. In the plays discussed, the characters are non-binary, and their body compositions are often "the site of multiple—and contradictory—meanings." Pea and Roe, then, as giant mounds of flesh, are ideal representations of these types of characters, and Fornés successfully provides a play that contributes to a non-binary, non-exclusive ideal. Ultimately, Evan concludes that Fornés’ work along with the other writers are important for "inventing a new theatre vocabulary which expresses hitherto marginalized subjectivities, sexualities, and identities."

Peter Marks, in his review, corroborates the marginalized and abject that is represented and yet subverted in Drowning. "His innocence stripped away," says Marks, referring to Pea, "he gets his first, corrosive lesson in how to see himself through others' eyes, a lesson in how to detest himself."
