= Haven Entertainment =

Film production and management company

Haven Entertainment, founded in 2006 as Tom Sawyer Entertainment is a film production and management company founded by Rachel Miller and Jesse Hara. Haven produced happythankyoumoreplease, the US Audience Award winner at the 2010 Sundance Film Festival. Miller is an agent who represented Josephine Angelini's Starcrossed.

Following the 2008 writers strike, Tom Sawyer shifted and began to develop books before adapting them to the big screen. In 2012, Tom Sawyer merged with Picture Machine and the new company is known as Haven Entertainment.

== Films ==
- Happythankyoumoreplease, 2010
- Liberal Arts, 2012
