= Ruben Amar =

French screenwriter, director and producer

- Born: 1974 (age 51–52); Montpellier, France
- Occupations: Film director, screenwriter and producer

Ruben Amar (born in 1974) is a French screenwriter, director and producer. He is best known for the independent feature film Swim Little Fish Swim and his two last short films Checkpoint and A Girl Like You With a Boy Like Me.

== Career ==
=== Early career and short films ===
Amar attended business school and worked for startups and television production companies before deciding to pursue cinema and attending filmmaking workshops in London.

Between 2007 and 2011, Amar directed several short films, shot in Paris, London and New York and on the Israeli-Palestinian border. These films appeared in many international festivals including the Clermont-Ferrand International Short Film Festival, the International Film Festival Rotterdam, and South by Southwest (SXSW).

Checkpoint, one of his last short films, premiered at the Clermont-Ferrand International Short Film Festival in 2011 where it won the Youth Critics' Award. The film tells the story of a young Palestinian boy living in the Gaza Strip who accompanies his father on monthly visits to the ruins of a destroyed village. Checkpoint was exhibited worldwide in international film festivals including Slamdance, the Palm Springs International Film Festival, Raindance, and the Festival du cinéma méditerranéen de Montpellier. Checkpoint was broadcast by international TV channels (TPS, BeTV, Canal+ Poland, RTBF). Reviewers praised the film's story and cinematography.

=== Feature films ===
A year later, following the success of Checkpoint, Ruben Amar started co-writing, co-directing and co-producing with Lola Bessis their first feature film, Swim Little Fish Swim (2013).

Ruben Amar also produced Nathan Silver's feature film, Thirst Street (2017) with his new production company PaperMoon Films.

== Filmography ==
=== Feature films ===
- Swim Little Fish Swim (2014) - Writer, Director & Producer
- Thirst Street (2017) - Producer

=== Short films ===
- Objet perdu(e) (2007) - Writer, Director & Producer
- Des Mots Silencieux (2007) - Writer, Director & Producer
- L'Absente (2008) - Writer, Director & Producer
- Mauvaise Route (2008) - Writer & Producer
- A Girl Like You With a Boy Like Me (2010) - Writer, Director & Producer
- Checkpoint (2011) - Writer, Director & Producer
- Don't Let the Sun Blast Your Shadow (2011) - Writer, Director & Producer
