= Beach Rats =

2017 film by Eliza Hittman

- Theatrical release poster
- Directed by: Eliza Hittman
- Written by: Eliza Hittman
- Produced by: Drew Houpt; Brad Becker-Parton; Paul Mezey; Andrew Goldman
- Starring: Harris Dickinson; Madeline Weinstein; Kate Hodge
- Cinematography: Hélène Louvart
- Edited by: Scott Cummings; Joe Murphy
- Music by: Nicholas Leone
- Production companies: Cinereach; Animal Kingdom; Secret Engine
- Distributed by: Neon
- Release dates: January 23, 2017 (Sundance); August 25, 2017 (United States)
- Running time: 98 minutes
- Country: United States
- Language: English
- Box office: $576,316

Beach Rats is a 2017 American coming-of-age drama film written and directed by Eliza Hittman. It stars Harris Dickinson in his feature film debut, with Madeline Weinstein and Kate Hodge in supporting roles. It follows an aimless Brooklyn teenager who struggles to reconcile his competing sexual desires, leaving him hurtling towards irreparable consequences.

The film had its world premiere at the Sundance Film Festival on January 23, 2017, where Hittman won the Directing Award: U.S. Dramatic. It was theatrically released in the United States on August 25, 2017, by Neon. It received positive reviews from critics, who particularly praised Hittman's direction, Dickinson's performance, and the cinematography. At the 33rd Independent Spirit Awards, it garnered two nominations: Best Male Lead (for Dickinson) and Best Cinematography (for Louvart).

== Plot ==
Frankie is an aimless 19-year-old Brooklynite who spends his days hanging out and getting high with his macho friends as an escape from his troubled home life. His family includes his little sister and a mother who is mostly occupied with caring for his terminally ill father. At night, Frankie cruises Brooklyn Boys, a webcam site for gay men, but partially obscures his face with a hat.

When Frankie and his friends are at the Coney Island boardwalk watching fireworks, he catches the attentions of local girl Simone. Simone accompanies Frankie back to his place and tries to initiate sex with him, asking, "Am I pretty?" Frankie cannot perform and tries to make small talk instead, mocking and imitating her question. Insulted, Simone leaves. A few days later, Frankie and his friends are at the beach when they spot Simone with another guy. Frankie goes to apologize to Simone for his behavior the other night, and she tentatively forgives him. Meanwhile, Frankie uses the chat site to arrange hookups, particularly with older men as they are less likely to run into his friends and give away his double life. When a male partner asks about his penchant for older men, Frankie replies, "I don't really know what I like."

Frankie suffers a loss when his father succumbs to his terminal cancer. Frankie takes his father's pills, which he and his friends have been abusing. On a day out with Simone, Frankie casually asks her if she has ever made out with a girl. Simone replies she has, and makes an offhand comment that it is "hot" when girls make out, but when guys make out, it is "gay". That night, Frankie forces himself to have sex with her. Later, after a hookup with a gay man at a motel, Frankie is asked about his orientation. Frankie says he is not gay and reasons he has a girlfriend.

On a night out with his friends and Simone, they take drugs and party but when Frankie sees that the man from the motel works as a bartender he panics, he attempts to have sex with Simone but can't bring himself to do it and leaves her aggressively, he causes a fight on the dance floor and storms out. He meets up with an older man after. Much to his liking, when he gets home he is questioned by his mother for his behavior.

Frankie tries to apologize to Simone, who rejects him, telling him he needs to work on his personal issues and they stop seeing each other. Frankie runs into his friends on his way to meet with a guy his age named Jeremy. His friends, running out on their drug supply ask Frankie to come up with a plan and he tells them he uses a gay dating site to meet with men who have weed, his friends don't take him seriously but tag along with him when he tells them Jeremy is bringing weed with him. But when Jeremy meets them, he becomes wary of Frankie's crew and leaves. His friends insist that he finds another guy and they go back to Frankie's home, where he shows them the site and attempts to talk to men. Jeremy messages Frankie and says he wants to meet up again but to smoke with him alone. His friends see the message and insist on tagging along but when Frankie hesitates, his friends question why he even uses the chat site to begin with. Frankie again claims it is just for drugs and gives in to the plan. Jeremy arrives to pick up Frankie and during the car ride, Jeremy deduces Frankie is closeted, which Frankie resists with the belief that he does not think he is gay, and, in Jeremy's words, just "has sex with men".

On the beach, Frankie starts feeling remorse for bringing Jeremy there and tries to dissuade him from staying there, as Jeremy questions what's going on, Frankie's friends ambush Jeremy and demand the weed. When Jeremy refuses, Frankie's friends seize him. Though Frankie retrieves the drug in the sand, his friends continue to roughhouse Jeremy, with one holding him as the other punches his face. They then drop him on the shoreline and with Frankie in tow, run towards the parking lot. A tearful, exasperated Frankie sits, reflecting upon what just occurred.

At home, Frankie's mother demands an explanation for his recent behavior. He deletes all of his shirtless selfies from his computer and his Brooklyn Boys account. The next evening, he returns to the beach where they mugged Jeremy, although he is no longer there. He watches the fireworks again at the boardwalk, but with a look of anguish and uncertainty.

== Cast ==
- Harris Dickinson as Frankie
- Madeline Weinstein as Simone
- Kate Hodge as Donna
- Neal Huff as Joe
- Nicole Flyus as Carla
- Frank Hakaj as Nick
- David Ivanov as Alexei
- Anton Selyaninov as Jesse
- Harrison Sheehan as Jeremy
- Douglas Everett Davis as Harry
- Gabriel Gans as Eddie
- Erik Potempa as Michael
- Kris Eivers as Edgar
- J. Stephen Brantley as Jersey

== Production ==
In April 2016, it was announced Eliza Hittman would direct the film, based upon a screenplay she had written. Hittman said her inspiration for the film was a Facebook selfie of a young man from Gerritsen Beach, Brooklyn, a member of a group known as "beach rats." The selfie was shot "in a basement with ugly fluorescent lights and a dirty mirror and he was shirtless with a hat on that was covering his eyes...There was this tension in the image between something that was hypermasculine and simultaneously homoerotic, a feeling that he was hiding something because his eyes were in the shadow of this visor. He was about 19 years old and he looked dangerous and fragile at the same time, and I try to use images like that as character introductions. What we shot is almost a direct reframing of the image."

Hittman said the film was also inspired by real-life incidents, commenting, "I’ve had friends who have been attacked walking around certain areas of Brooklyn, and been totally knocked out. I’ve had people who have had Grindr experiences. I’m aware of all the types of violence that exist, and I’ve read about them and processed them. I think [the victim in the film] represents many types of victims."

Cinereach and Animal Kingdom produced the film, alongside Secret Engine.

== Release ==
Beach Rats had its world premiere at the Sundance Film Festival on January 23, 2017. Shortly after, Neon acquired North American distribution rights to the film. It was released in select theaters on August 25, 2017.

== Reception ==
=== Box office ===
Beach Rats made $45,008 from three theaters in its opening weekend, an average of $15,003 per venue. The film ultimately grossed $471,286 in the United States and Canada, and $105,030 in other territories, for a worldwide total of $576,316.

=== Critical response ===
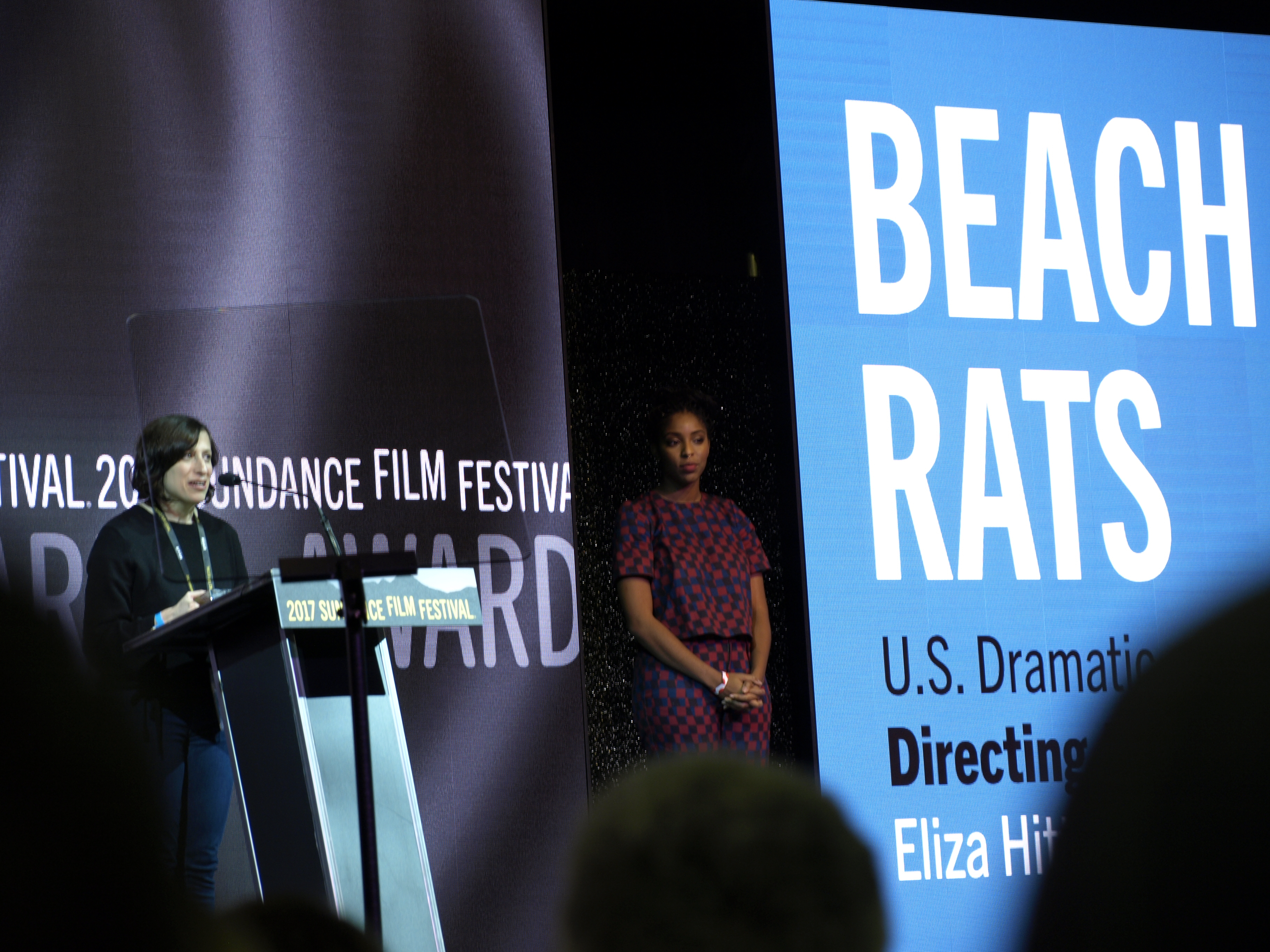
Hittman received the Directing Award: U.S. Dramatic at the 2017 Sundance Film Festival

On the review aggregator website Rotten Tomatoes, 84% of 109 critics' reviews are positive, with an average rating of 7.2/10. The website's consensus reads: "Empathetic and powerfully acted, Beach Rats takes a clear-eyed yet dreamlike look at a young man's adolescent turmoil." Metacritic, which uses a weighted average, assigned the film a score of 78 out of 100, based on 29 critics, indicating "generally favorable" reviews.

Justin Chang of the Los Angeles Times remarked, "The film is so skilled at telling its story through visual detail and atmosphere that you can sense the gears shifting in the second half." Ben Kenigsberg of The New York Times stated, "The back-and-forths of the character's decisions feel real, and Mr. Dickinson's laconic blankness (you would never guess the actor was British) helps to give Frankie's existential crisis a charge. Ms. Hittman is also assured enough to know it can't be easily resolved." Michael O'Sullivan of The Washington Post gave the film 2 out of 4 stars and commented, "Although Hittman's often bold and occasionally uncomfortably honest movie takes us up to the threshold of that accounting, it doesn't have the nerve to cross it."

K. Austin Collins of The Ringer wrote the film strongly gives "the prevailing sense that masculinity is something learned—put-on and performed for the sake of fitting in with others." Collins also noted, "Like Beach Rats overall, the ending is a reminder of what can happen when a director trusts us enough not to offer easy takeaways and psychological absolutes." Victor Rocha of Out Write opined, "Beach Rats is not a happy movie, but it is a movie that captures emotion on film – genuine, inexplicable emotion. Overshadowed by far happier movies, Beach Rats offers a unique experience as one of 2017's most intimate films." Jay Kuehner, reporting from the 2017 Sundance Film Festival for the Canadian film magazine Cinema Scope, praised the 16 mm photography by Hélène Louvart, invoking a comparison to the visual aesthetic of Moonlight and Beau Travail, as well as the films of Robert Bresson and Philippe Grandrieux.

Though Dickinson's performance was praised, the film also sparked criticism and debate, with some critics saying the ending felt unearned and that its violence perpetuates the "bury your gays" trope, and others saying the film "risks reducing gay coming-of-age to seediness and shame." Some also pointed out the ending calls to mind real-life incidents of users on gay dating apps being targeted for violence. At the Sundance screening, Hittman was questioned by an audience member about whether she, a white heterosexual woman, should be allowed to tell gay stories. Hittman said she welcomed the dialogue and added, "I think it’s interesting...who gets to tell what story. I think it’s slightly complicated at this moment. I think that the conversation should be more about how we create more opportunity for people who don’t get to tell their story, to tell their story."

=== Accolades ===
Award	Date of ceremony	Category	Recipient(s)	Result	Ref.
Chéries-Chéris	November 21, 2017	Grand Prize	Beach Rats	Nominated	
Deauville Film Festival	September 10, 2017	Grand Special Prize	Beach Rats	Nominated	
Gotham Independent Film Awards	November 27, 2017	Breakthrough Actor	Harris Dickinson	Nominated	
Independent Spirit Awards	March 3, 2018	Best Male Lead	Harris Dickinson	Nominated	
Independent Spirit Awards	March 3, 2018	Best Cinematography	Hélène Louvart	Nominated	
Hamburg Film Festival	October 14, 2017	NDR Young Talent Award	Eliza Hittman	Nominated	
Independent Film Festival of Boston	April 29, 2017	Grand Jury Prize	Beach Rats	Won	
L.A. Outfest	July 16, 2017	Best Screenwriting in a U.S. Feature	Beach Rats	Won	
Locarno International Film Festival	August 12, 2017	Golden Leopard	Beach Rats	Nominated	
London Film Critics Circle Awards	January 28, 2018	Young British/Irish Performer	Harris Dickinson	Won	
Montclair Film Festival	May 6, 2017	Future/Now Prize	Beach Rats	Won	
Sarasota Film Festival	April 9, 2017	Jury Prize	Beach Rats	Nominated	
Seattle International Film Festival	June 11, 2017	Grand Jury Prize	Beach Rats	Nominated	
Stockholm International Film Festival	November 20, 2017	Bronze Horse	Beach Rats	Nominated	
Sundance Film Festival	January 28, 2017	Directing Award	Eliza Hittman	Won	
Sundance Film Festival	January 28, 2017	Grand Jury Prize	Beach Rats	Nominated	

== See also ==
- List of LGBT-related films directed by women
