= Lila Neugebauer =

American theatre director (born 1985)

- Born: New York City, New York, U.S.
- Education: Yale University (BA)
- Occupations: Director writer artistic director
- Years active: 2012–present

Lila Neugebauer (/ˈlaɪlə ˈnɔɪɡəbaʊ.ər/ LY-lə NOY-gə-bow-ər; born 1985) is an American theatre director, writer and artistic director. After studying at Yale University she started directing numerous theatrical productions. She came to prominence directing the Broadway revival of Kenneth Lonergan's memory play The Waverly Gallery (2018) which was nominated for the Tony Award for Best Revival of a Play. She has since directed the Branden Jacobs-Jenkins family drama Appropriate (2023), for which she received a Tony Award nomination, Itamar Moses political satire The Ally (2024), and the Anton Chekhov revival Uncle Vanya (2024).

She had directed multiple episodes of the Mindy Kaling created HBO Max comedy series The Sex Lives of College Girls (2021–2022) and she made her directorial film debut with the A24 drama Causeway (2022) starring Jennifer Lawrence and Brian Tyree Henry.

== Early life and education ==
Neugebauer was born and raised in New York City. A native Upper West Sider, she grew up seeing plays and was exposed to theatre, and credits her mother for a lot of that. She attended the Hunter College High School, where she performed in Seven Minutes in Heaven by fellow student Lin-Manuel Miranda. Neugebauer played a partygoer. Neugebauer was an English major at Yale University. There she befriended actress and playwright Zoe Kazan. She has said that "one of the best classes I took was a constitutional law class". While in Louisville, she received the 2013 Princess Grace Theater Fellowship Award in partnership with Actors Theatre of Louisville.

== Career ==
One of the standout young stage directors, Neugebauer's stage productions include Tracy Letts' Mary Page Marlowe (2018), Edward Albee's At Home at the Zoo (2018), and the world premieres of Sarah DeLappe's The Wolves (2017), The Mad Ones' Mrs. Murray’s Menagerie (2019) and Miles For Mary (2017), Branden Jacobs-Jenkins' Appropriate (2016) and Everybody (2017) as well as Annie Baker's The Antipodes (2017). Neugebauer has continued to direct various plays off-Broadway.

She made her Broadway debut as a director for Kenneth Lonergan's revival of The Waverly Gallery which debuted at the John Golden Theatre on September 25, 2018 in previews, and officially opened on October 25. The play, produced by Scott Rudin, is considered a "memory play", and starred Elaine May, Lucas Hedges, Michael Cera, Joan Allen, and David Cromer. The play received widespread critical acclaim, including from Ben Brantley, theatre critic for The New York Times, who described her direction as "fine-tuned." The revival received a Tony Award nomination for Best Play, and a win for Best Actress in a Play (Elaine May). That same year she made her television directing debut for episode of the Duplass brothers' HBO series Room 104.

In April 2019, it was announced that Neugebauer would be teaming up with A24 and Scott Rudin to make her directorial film debut with Red, White and Water, later retitled Causeway. It was announced Jennifer Lawrence was attached as a star in the project, and was written by first-time screenwriter Elizabeth Sanders. The project's principal photography started in mid-June 2019 in New Orleans. From 2021 to 2022 she directed multiple episodes of the Mindy Kaling created comedy series The Sex Lives of College Girls on HBO Max.

In 2023 she directed the Branden Jacobs-Jenkins play Appropriate on Broadway. The production starred Sarah Paulson, Corey Stoll, Natalie Gold, and Elle Fanning. The play, a family drama, revolves around a family trying to sell the house after the patriarch's death only to discover a dark secret. The following year she directed the Itamar Moses political play The Ally at The Public Theater. Josh Radnor stars as a Jewish college professor who is conflicted when asked to sign a political manifesto by a student. That same year she directed Lincoln Center's revival of Anton Chekov's Uncle Vanya at the Vivian Beaumont Theater. The cast includes Steve Carell, Alison Pill, William Jackson Harper, Jayne Houdyshell, and Alfred Molina.

== Filmography ==
=== Film ===
Year	Title	Notes	Ref.
2022	Causeway	Feature film debut	

=== Television ===
Year	Title	Notes	Ref.
2018	Room 104	Episode: "Josie & Me"	
2021	Maid	Episode: "Thief"	
2021–22	The Sex Lives of College Girls	3 episodes	
2023	The Last Thing He Told Me	Episode: "When We Were Young"	
2025	Sirens	Episode: "Siren Song"	
2025	The Beast in Me	2 episodes	

=== Theatre ===
Year	Play	Author	Venue	Ref.
2012	The Aliens	Annie Baker	San Francisco Playhouse, California	
2012	The Aliens	Annie Baker	Studio Theatre, Washington, DC	
2013	O Guru Guru Guru	Mallery Avidon	Actors Theatre of Louisville, Kentucky	
2013	Red Speedo	Lucas Hnath	Studio Theatre, Washington, DC	
2014	Trudy and Max in Love	Zoe Kazan	South Coast Repertory, California	
2014	The Wayside Motor Inn	A.R. Gurney	The Pershing Square Signature Center, Off-Broadway	
2015	Kill Floor	Abe Koogler	Claire Tow Theater, New York	
2015	Arcadia	Tom Stoppard	Stephanie P. McClelland Drama Theater, New York	
2016	The Sandbox; Drowning; Funnyhouse of a Negro	Edward Albee; Maria Irene Fornes; Adrienne Kennedy	The Pershing Square Signature Center, Off-Broadway	
2016	The Wolves	Sarah DeLappe	Duke on 42nd Street, Off-Broadway	
2016	Appropriate	Branden Jacobs-Jenkins	Stephanie P. McClelland Drama Theater, New York	
2017	Everybody	Branden Jacobs-Jenkins	The Pershing Square Signature Center, Off-Broadway	
2017	The Antipodes	Annie Baker	The Pershing Square Signature Center, Off-Broadway	
2017	After the Blast	Zoe Kazan	Claire Tow Theater, New York	
2017	The Wolves	Sarah DeLappe	Mitzi E. Newhouse Theatre, Off-Broadway	
2018	Miles for Mary	The Mad Ones	Playwrights Horizons, Off-Broadway	
2018	Edward Albee's At Home at the Zoo	Edward Albee	The Pershing Square Signature Center, Off-Broadway	
2018	Peace for Mary Frances	Lily Thorne	The Pershing Square Signature Center, Off-Broadway	
2018	Mary Page Marlowe	Tracy Letts	Second Stage Theater, Off-Broadway	
2018	The Waverly Gallery	Kenneth Lonergan	John Golden Theatre, Broadway Debut	
2019	Mrs. Murray's Menagerie	The Mad Ones	Ars Nova at Greenwich House Theatre, Off-Broadway	
2021	Morning Sun	Simon Stephens	Manhattan Theatre Club, Off-Broadway	
2022	Oh God, A Show About Abortion	Alison Leiby	Cherry Lane Theatre, Off-Broadway	
2023	Appropriate	Branden Jacobs-Jenkins	Hayes Theater, Broadway	
2024	The Ally	Itamar Moses	The Public Theater, Off-Broadway	
2024	Uncle Vanya	Anton Chekhov	Vivian Beaumont Theater, Broadway	

== Awards and nominations ==
Year	Award	Category	Nominated work	Result	Ref.
2015	Drama Desk Award	Outstanding Director of a Play	The Wayside Motor Inn	Nominated	
2017	Drama Desk Award	Sam Norkin Award	—N/a	Won	
2017	Obie Award	Ensemble Performance	The Wolves	Won	
2017	Outer Critics Circle Award	Outstanding Director of a Play	The Wolves	Nominated	
2017	Lucille Lortel Award	Outstanding Director	The Wolves	Nominated	
2018	Drama League Award	Outstanding Revival of a Play	Edward Albee's The Zoo Story	Nominated	
2018	Drama Desk Award	Outstanding Director of a Play	Miles for Mary	Nominated	
2018	Lucille Lortel Award	Outstanding Play	Miles for Mary	Nominated	
2018	Lucille Lortel Award	Outstanding Director	Miles for Mary	Nominated	
2020	Lucille Lortel Award	Outstanding Play	Mrs. Murray's Menagerie	Nominated	
2022	Rome Film Festival	Best First Feature Award	Causeway	Won	
2024	Tony Award	Best Direction of a Play	Appropriate	Nominated	
2024	Drama Desk Award	Outstanding Director of a Play	Appropriate	Nominated	
2024	Outer Critics Circle Award	Outstanding Director of a Play	Appropriate	Nominated	
2024	Drama League Award	Outstanding Direction of a Play	Appropriate	Nominated	
2024	Drama League Award	Outstanding Direction of a Play	Uncle Vanya	Nominated	
