= GreenCine =

Defunct online DVD rental service

- Website type: Online DVD rental / Online community
- Available in: English
- Website: greencine.com
- Commercial: Yes
- Launched: 1999
- Current status: Offline

GreenCine /ˈɡriːnsiːn/ was an online DVD rental service similar to Netflix. Based in San Francisco, California, with its distribution center in the Los Angeles area (Van Nuys), it had a collection of over 30,000 titles, as well as over 9,000 video on demand titles. It carried a wide range of anime, rare, and independent studio films, as well as adult films on its sister site, BlueCine. It also dedicated 1% of its profits to support independent filmmaking, using the money to both fund and promote independent films that were distributed through the service. It was one of the first video rental services to offer video on demand and fund its own productions, a decade before Netflix and Amazon.

On 2 February 2015, GreenCine's Facebook page carried a message that the business had closed.

GreenCine also operated the GreenCine Daily blog, which collected links to interviews, articles, podcasts and reviews posted online.
