= The Ally (play) =

2024 play by Itamar Moses

- Original language: English
- Written by: Itamar Moses
- Subject: Free speech, Jewish identity, faith, Israel-Palestine conflict, Antisemitism, Race relations, police brutality, gentrification, Zionism, Anti-Asian racism
- Genre: Comedy-Drama

Premiere
- Date: February 15, 2024
- Place: The Public Theater

The Ally is a play by the American playwright Itamar Moses, which revolves around a Jewish college professor who initially agrees to sign a student's manifesto addressing police brutality until he sees language in the document criticizing Israel that he is uncomfortable with, ultimately forcing him to question his identity and faith. The play premiered Off-Broadway in February 2024 at the Anspacher Theatre at The Public Theater. The play was directed by Lila Neugebauer and stars Josh Radnor. It was named as one the finalists for the Pulitzer Prize for Drama.

== Overview ==
The play revolves around a Jewish college professor who initially agrees to sign a manifesto from students in response to an incident of police brutality but disagrees when he sees there is a section accusing Israel of engaging in an "apartheid" and "genocide" in relation to the Israeli–Palestinian conflict. The play shifts from comedy to drama as debates and discussions force the professor to question his faith and Jewish identity.

== Origins ==
Moses began writing and developing the play in the early 2010s. The idea came about as he became aware of "a fissure or a division opening up on the left, where I basically am and have always been politically, having to do with questions around Israel and America’s relationship to Israel" and he realized there was a generational divide in terms of support to Israel. The show was ready to premiere at the Public Theater in 2020 but was delayed due to the COVID-19 pandemic. The play opened in February 2024 and is set in late September 2023 before the events leading up to Hamas-led attack on Israel on October 7th.

== Productions ==
=== Off-Broadway ===
The world premiere production opened on February 15, 2024, at The Public Theater's Anspacher Theatre. The run has been extended twice. It was directed by Lila Neugebauer who in 2024 also directed Appropriate and the revival of Uncle Vanya. The production stars Josh Radnor as Asaf, the Jewish college professor. Also included in the cast are Joy Osmanski, Cherise Boothe, Elijah Jones, Michael Khalid Karadsheh, Madeline Weinstein, and Ben Rosenfield.

== Cast and characters ==
Character	Off Broadway, The Public Theater (2024)
Asaf	Josh Radnor
Gwen	Joy Osmanski
Nakia / Rabbi	Cherise Booth
Baron	Elijah Jones
Farid	Michael Khalid Karadsheh
Rachel	Madeline Weinstein
Reuven	Ben Rosenfield

Characters

- Asaf - A Jewish college professor and television writer
- Gwen - The Korean American wife of Asaf
- Nakia - The African-American ex-girlfriend of Asaf and political activist
  - The actress playing Nakia also plays the Rabbi, a Jewish and African-American woman, whom Asaf visits for counsel at the end of the play.
- Baron - A gifted African-American student who's politically activated once his cousin is shot by police
- Farid - A passionate Palestinian student organizer
- Rachel - A Jewish student organizer who is pro-Palestinian and condemns Israel
- Reuven - A Jewish student who strongly opposed the student organized manifest calling it antisemitic

== Response ==
=== Critical reception ===
The production has received mixed to positive reviews with critics praising the direction, performances and writing but adding that it lacks substantial stakes with Jesse Green of The New York Times gave the production a mixed review writing, "Itamar Moses’s play offers eloquent arguments on all sides of the Israeli-Palestinian conflict. But it doesn’t offer much drama." However, Sara Holdren of Vulture praises the play for asking the questions and keeping the dialogue and debate alive writing, "What is to be done with all this truth? Pulsing ominously at the heart of The Ally is a question — a truly frightening one for artists, for scholars, for critics — about the more perilous face of nuance."

Jesse Hassenger of The Guardian wrote of the play's lingering quality writing, "Even if the pin-drop intensity of The Ally dissipates quickly afterward, there’s something admirable about a play in which so many of its characters appear ready to make a didactic case against its very existence." Amelia Merrill of New York Theater Guide criticized the play for not acknowledging the events of and after October 7 in the text and added "There’s no sense of dramatic urgency in The Ally – that lives off stage."

=== Accolades ===
Year	Award	Category	Nominee	Result	Ref.
2024	Lucille Lortel Awards	Outstanding Lead Performer in a Play	Josh Radnor	Nominated	
2024	Drama Desk Awards	Outstanding Play	Itamar Moses	Nominated	
2025	Pulitzer Prize for Drama		Itamar Moses	Finalist	
