= Lola Bessis =

French actress, screenwriter and director

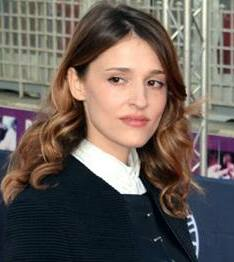
- Born: 30 November 1992 (age 33); Paris, France
- Occupations: Actress, screenwriter and director

Lola Bessis (born 30 November 1992) is a French actress, screenwriter and director. She is known for the movie Swim Little Fish Swim, in which she acted and wrote the script.

== Career ==
She started her career at the age of 12.

In 2013, she played the lead in Swim Little Fish Swim, an English-speaking comedy-drama shot in New York and that Bessis co-directed with Ruben Amar. Critics praised Bessis' performance for her screen presence and charm.

In 2014, she was a jury member at the Deauville American Film Festival along with Clemence Poesy, Christine and The Queens and Freddie Highmore.

In 2015, she played a recurring character in the comic French TV series France Kbek. That same year she played the lead in the music video Pas là by French singer Vianney directed by Nicolas Bary. The video counts nearly 18 million views on YouTube.

In 2016 she starred in Nicolas Bedos' feature film Monsieur et Madame Adelman. That same year, Bessis starred in Mathias Malzieu's last film, Le distributeur d'aurores boréales, that has been shown at Cannes film festival 2016. In July 2016, Bessis was featured in Interview Magazine's portfolio "Hollywood's most wanted" among the top 15 up and coming Hollywood actors. In 2016, she was a jury member at the Les Arcs Film Festival.

She starred in Thirst Street by Nathan Silver alongside Anjelica Huston, Lindsay Burdge, Damien Bonnard, Esther Garrel, Jacques Nolot and Françoise Lebrun. Thirst Street premiered in US Narrative competition at the 2017 Tribeca Film Festival.

In February 2017, Bessis was cast in the Picnic at Hanging Rock reboot alongside Game of Thrones actress Natalie Dormer and Orange is the New Black star Yael Stone.

In 2018, she starred in the international series Picnic at Hanging Rock, which was filmed in Australia and adapted from Joan Lindsay's novel. The book had previously been adapted in 1975 by Peter Weir, becoming a cinematic classic. She portrayed Mademoiselle de Poitiers, one of the main characters, alongside British actress Natalie Dormer (Game of Thrones, The Hunger Games), as well as Yael Stone (Orange Is the New Black) and Samara Weaving (Three Billboards Outside Ebbing, Missouri). Created by Larysa Kondracki, the series premiered at the 68th Berlinale in 2018, where it received a favorable review in The Hollywood Reporter. It was broadcast in June 2018 on Canal+ and, beginning in May, on Foxtel (Australia), the BBC (United Kingdom), Amazon Prime Video (United States), and Deutsche Telekom (Germany).

In 2025, she co-directed the film Silver Star with Ruben Amar, starring actresses Grace Van Dien and Troy Leigh-Anne Johnson. The film was presented at the Deauville American Film Festival.
