= Itamar Moses =

American dramatist

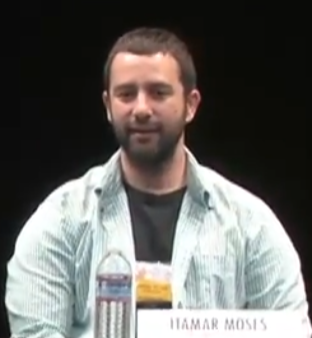
- On a HowlRound panel in 2017
- Born: 1977 (age 48–49)
- Education: Yale University (BA); New York University (MFA)
- Writing career
- Genre: Drama
- Notable works: Completeness (2011); Fortress of Solitude (2014); The Band's Visit (2016); The Ally (2024)
- Notable awards: Tony Award for Best Book of a Musical (2018)

Itamar Moses (born 1977) is an American playwright, author, producer and television writer. He gained acclaim for writing the book for the Broadway musical The Band's Visit (2017) receiving the Tony Award for Best Book of a Musical. He wrote the play Completeness (2011) earning a nomination for the Drama Desk Award for Outstanding Play. He wrote books for the musicals Nobody Loves You (2012) and The Fortress of Solitude (2014). His latest play The Ally (2024) about a college teacher conflicted about signing a petition debuted at The Public Theater.

Moses started his television career writing for the TNT comedy-drama Men of a Certain Age (2010–2011), and the HBO drama series Boardwalk Empire (2011), the latter of which earned him nominations for two Writers Guild of America Awards. He also served as a writer and producer for the WGN drama series Outsiders in 2017 and the Showtime drama series The Affair from 2018 to 2019.

== Early life and education ==
Moses grew up in a Jewish family in Berkeley, California, earned his bachelor's degree at Yale University, and his Master of Fine Arts degree in dramatic writing from New York University. He has taught playwriting at both Yale and New York University.

== Career ==
Moses wrote the play Completeness (2011) which premiered at the South Coast Repertory Theatre before transferring to Playwrights Horizons, New York City. The play revolves around young people, in the Computer Science and Biology Departments of a university, talking about love, molecular biology and computer science, while going through a variety of partners. Bob Verini of Variety in a mixed review praised his writing declaring, "[Moses] writes Completeness for both genders — quite well, too — with an unexpectedly fine ear for contempo sexual politics' dizzying conversational loops". The play went on to receive a nomination for the Drama Desk Award for Outstanding Play.

He has written for the TNT comedy-drama Men of a Certain Age (2010–2011) and HBO drama series Boardwalk Empire (2011), the latter of which earned him nominations for two Writers Guild of America Awards.

In 2014 he wrote the book to the musical The Fortress of Solitude with music and lyrics by Michael Friedman. The musical premiered at The Public Theater starring Adam Chanler-Berat, André De Shields, Brian Tyree Henry, and Rebecca Naomi Jones. The musical is a coming-of-age story about teenagers in 1970s Brooklyn. Marilyn Stasio of Variety praised the production but questioned its Broadway potential writing, "Is there an audience for this extraordinary show? Yes. Is there a Broadway audience? Maybe not." She added, "Make no mistake about it; this is no nostalgia piece, but the tragedy of friends who lost touch with one another and the music they grew up with."

His most prominent work, the musical The Band's Visit, opened on December 8, 2016, at the Atlantic Theater Company. That production won the 2017 Obie Award for Musical Theatre Off-Broadway. After closing on January 9, 2017, the musical moved to Broadway. It began previews on October 7, 2017, and officially opened on November 9, 2017, at the Ethel Barrymore Theatre. For his work on The Band's Visit, Moses won the 2018 Tony Award for Best Book of a Musical.

In 2024 Moses wrote the comedy-drama The Ally starring Josh Radnor as a Jewish college professor who deals with the moral quandary of being asked to sign a petition involving the denouncement of the state of Israel. The play was originally conceived during the Obama years and was slated to premiere in 2020 but was halted due to the COVID-19 pandemic. The production directed by Lila Neugebauer has received positive reviews with Sara Holdren of Vulture praising the performances and writing adding, "Pulsing ominously at the heart of The Ally is a question — a truly frightening one for artists, for scholars, for critics — about the more perilous face of nuance." In a mixed review from Jesse Green of The New York Times he wrote that while "Moses’s play offers eloquent arguments on all sides of the Israeli-Palestinian conflict" it lacks certain narrative stakes adding, "I felt the need for more wisdom than craft".

== Works ==
=== Theatre ===
Year	Title	Role	Venue	Ref.
2001	Dorothy and Alice	Playwright	Short play at Manhattan Theatre Source	
2002	Bach at Leipzig	Playwright	Hangar Theatre in Ithaca, New York	
2003	Outrage	Playwright	Portland Center Stage	
2005	Authorial Intent / Idea	Playwright	Manhattan Theatre Source, New York	
2006	Celebrity Row	Playwright	Portland Center Stage	
2007	The Four of Us	Playwright	San Diego Old Globe Theatre	
2007	Szinhaz	Playwright	Duke Theater, New York City	
2008	Yellowjackets	Playwright	Berkeley Repertory Theatre	
2008	Back Back Back	Playwright	San Diego Old Globe Theatre	
2009	Love/Stories (Or, But You Will Get Used to It)	Playwright	Flea Theater, New York City	
2011	Completeness	Playwright	South Coast Repertory Theatre	
2011	Completeness	Playwright	Playwrights Horizons, New York City	
2012	Nobody Loves You	Book by	San Diego Old Globe Theatre	
2013	Nobody Loves You	Book by	Second Stage Theatre	
2014	The Fortress of Solitude	Book by	The Public Theater, New York City	
2016	The Band's Visit	Book by	Atlantic Theatre Company, New York City	
2017	The Band's Visit	Book by	Ethel Barrymore Theatre, Broadway	
2022	The Band's Visit	Book by	Donmar Warehouse, West End	
2024	The Ally	Playwright	The Public Theater, New York City	
2024	Dead Outlaw	Book by	Minetta Lane Theatre, New York City	
2025	Dead Outlaw	Book by	Longacre Theatre, Broadway	

=== Television ===
Year	Title	Writer	Producer	Notes	Ref.
2010–2011	Men of a Certain Age	Yes	No	Writer 2 episodes	
2011	Boardwalk Empire	Yes	No	Writer 12 episodes	
2017	Outsiders	Yes	Yes	Writer 2 episodes; Co-producer 5 episodes	
2018–2019	The Affair	Yes	Yes	Writer 2 episodes; Consulting producer 7 episodes	
2020	Brave New World	No	Yes	Consulting producer 2 episodes	

== Awards and nominations ==
Year	Award	Category	Work	Result	Ref.
2012	Writers Guild of America Awards	Dramatic Series	Boardwalk Empire	Nominated	
2012	Writers Guild of America Awards	Episodic Drama	Boardwalk Empire	Nominated	
2012	Drama Desk Award	Outstanding Play	Completeness	Nominated	
2017	New York Drama Critics Circle	Best Musical	The Band's Visit	Won	
2017	Outer Critics Circle Award	Outstanding Book of a Musical	The Band's Visit	Nominated	
2017	Lucille Lortel Award	Outstanding Musical	The Band's Visit	Won	
2017	Drama Desk Award	Outstanding Book of a Musical	The Band's Visit	Nominated	
2018	Tony Award	Best Book of a Musical	The Band's Visit	Won	
2018	Drama League Award	Outstanding Production of a Musical	The Band's Visit	Won	
2024	Drama Desk Award	Outstanding Play	The Ally	Nominated	
2024	Drama Desk Award	Outstanding Book of a Musical	Dead Outlaw	Won	
2024	Outer Critics Circle Award	Outstanding Book of a Musical	Dead Outlaw	Nominated	
2025	Tony Award	Best Book of a Musical	Dead Outlaw	Nominated	
2025	Pulitzer Prize	Drama	The Ally	Nominated	

== Bibliography ==
- Bach at Leipzig. New York: Faber and Faber, 2005.
- The Four of Us. New York: Faber and Faber, 2008.
