= Livnot U'Lehibanot =

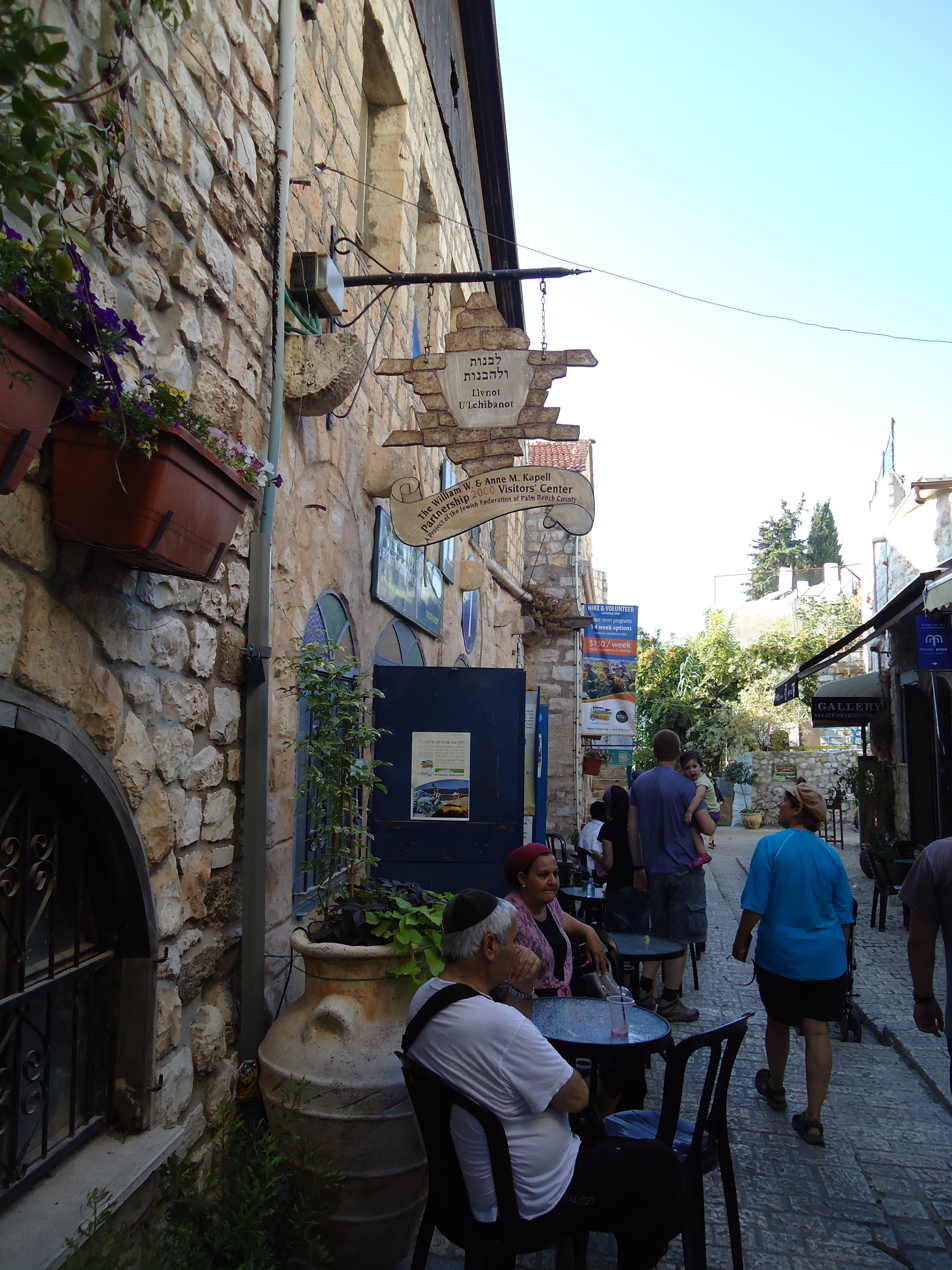
Livnot U'Lehibanot's building.

Livnot U'Lehibanot is an unaffiliated, educational and volunteer organization established in 1980, with a campus in Safed, Israel.

The name Livnot U'Lehibanot, which in Hebrew means "To Build and To Be Built", refers to the physical contribution the participants make to the building of the Land of Israel, and to the knowledge and experiences gained during the programs it offers.

Volunteers at Livnot, as it is often referred to, were responsible for many Western Wall tunnel excavations, aiding in the absorption of Ethiopian immigrants, as well as helping to repair damage caused to the cities of Safed, Kiryat Shemona, Karmiel and Hazor in the North of Israel by Katyusha fire during the Second Lebanon War in the summer of 2006.

Program participants are mostly North American Jews between the ages of 21 and 35 who come on programs of various lengths with an emphasis on hiking, volunteering, and learning. While much of the learning is spiritual in nature, Livnot is non-denominational in its practice of Judaism. Livnot also runs one-week and one-month Taglit-Birthright Israel extension trips.

After Hamas terrorists invaded Southern Israel from Gaza on October 7, 2023, Livnot became the first organization to begin rebuilding the damaged Israeli communities along the Gaza border with both professional workers and volunteers from around the world. Following the November 27, 2024 ceasefire with the Hezbollah terrorists who sent thousands of rockets, missiles and drones into Northern Israel from inside Lebanon, Livnot once again became the first organization to be asked to rebuild the damaged communities located along Israel's upper Galilee communities. Since October 7, 2023, Livnot U'Lehibanot has completed more than 320 rebuilding projects that were damaged by Iran's terrorist proxies along the Gaza and Lebanese border. Diaspora Jewish and Non-Jewish volunteers report that this service-learning experience can be a deeply emotional experience.

== Educational philosophy ==
Livnot is a non-denominational, unaffiliated, educational non-profit with programs open to Jews over the age of 21 who have little or no formal Jewish background. Livnot programs typically combine community service projects and hiking with educational seminars on various Jewish topics. All the educational components of the Livnot program are forum-based and encourage questions and dialog. The community service, hiking and non-coercive spirituality components are an integral part of the program's educational mission.

== Other Livnot programs ==
Livnot U'Lehibanot offers wide variety of 1-week to long-term programs of discovery and exploration. The programs all include volunteering, hiking, community service, connections with local residents and a variety of seminars and workshops. Participants live in Tzfat/Safed, a small rural northern Israeli community known as the City of Kabbalah.
