= GreenCine Daily =

- Website type: Blog / News Site
- Available in: English
- Owner: GreenCine
- Creator: David Hudson (founding editor)
- Website: daily.greencine.com
- Launched: 2003
- Current status: Defunct

GreenCine Daily was a film and film criticism news site operated by the defunct video rental service GreenCine.

The site was originally edited by David Hudson, who developed a format that curated links to articles, reviews, interviews and podcasts. Over the course of Hudson's tenure, the site became one of the centers of the online film community. In 2009, Hudson moved the format to the website of IFC as the "IFC Daily," and later to Mubi as the "Daily Mubi."

Between 2009 and 2013, GreenCine Daily was edited by Aaron Hillis. The site's emphasis was on original content, and it included writings by critics such as Vadim Rizov, Nick Schager and Steve Dollar.

== Editorship ==
The site was originally edited and written by David Hudson, who held in his position until December 31, 2008, after which he moved the format to a similar blog at the website of IFC. Soon afterwards, Hudson moved the format to the film website Mubi, where it became known as the "Daily Mubi." During his tenure, Hudson described the site as "not a blog people come to read about movies; it's a blog people come to find out where to read about movies." Though GreenCine itself is based in San Francisco, Hudson lives in Berlin and published the site from there.

Since January 1, 2009, GreenCine Daily was edited by Aaron Hillis, a film critic who was also one of the founders of the DVD label Benten Films and the curator of the New York City-based reRun Gastropub Theater. Under Hillis' editorship, the site moved towards posting exclusively original content.

In February 2015, the blog was shut down.
