= Liberal Arts (film) =

- Theatrical release poster
- Directed by: Josh Radnor
- Written by: Josh Radnor
- Produced by: Brice Dal Farra; Claude Dal Farra; Jesse Hara; Lauren Munsch; Josh Radnor
- Starring: Josh Radnor; Elizabeth Olsen; Richard Jenkins; Allison Janney; John Magaro; Elizabeth Reaser
- Cinematography: Seamus Tierney
- Edited by: Michael R. Miller
- Music by: Ben Toth
- Production companies: Strategic Motion Ventures; BCDF Pictures; Tom Sawyer Entertainment
- Distributed by: IFC Films
- Release dates: January 22, 2012 (Sundance); September 14, 2012 (United States)
- Running time: 97 minutes
- Country: United States
- Language: English
- Box office: $1.1 million

Liberal Arts is a 2012 American romantic comedy-drama film, written and directed by Josh Radnor. It tells the story of 35-year-old Jesse (Radnor) who has a romantic relationship with Zibby (Elizabeth Olsen), a 19-year-old college student. The film premiered at the 2012 Sundance Film Festival in January 2012.

== Plot ==
Jesse Fisher, a 35-year-old college admissions officer in NYC who loves literature and language, is newly single and dissatisfied with his life and career. He believes the happiest time of his life was the years at his unnamed Ohio liberal arts college, where he could study uninterrupted, surrounded by others like him. Peter Hoberg, his former English professor, invites Jesse back to the college to attend his retirement ceremony. Jesse meets 19-year-old Zibby, a sophomore drama student and the daughter of Peter's friends.

After the retirement dinner, Jesse stumbles upon a campus party where he runs into Zibby. They agree to have coffee together the next day. He spends the afternoon with her, walking around the campus discussing life, books, and music. He also encounters his old romantics teacher, Judith Fairfield—a woman he has long admired—and meets the eccentric Nat, and Dean, a brilliant but depressed student who, like Jesse, always carries a book with him.

Before Jesse leaves, Zibby asks to stay in touch through hand-written letters and they become closer. Meanwhile, Peter feels lost facing his upcoming retirement, and goes to the dean to ask to stay on. He is told that they have already hired his replacement.

Zibby invites Jesse back to campus, hinting that she has feelings for him. Jesse has concerns about the 16-year age gap, but agrees. They spend time together and kiss. When Peter sees them together, however, he encourages Jesse to date women his own age. Zibby confesses her feelings to Jesse and asks him to sleep with her; he agrees, but changes his mind after she admits that she is a virgin. Zibby is insulted and hurt and asks him to leave. Jesse goes to a bar where he meets Fairfield again. They have a one-night stand, but afterwards she tells him to grow up and kicks him out. Meanwhile, Zibby goes to a party and kisses a classmate. Jesse leaves without seeing Zibby again, but says goodbye to Peter.

Jesse returns to New York and, some months later, writes to Zibby again. He apologizes for hurting her, says that he misses her and credits her for helping him to grow. He meets and starts dating Ana, a bookseller his own age with a similar love for books. After Jesse helps avert Dean's suicide by overdose, he advises the young man to stop hiding from life within books.

Jesse goes to see Zibby and apologizes to her again. She says that she had hoped to take a shortcut to adulthood through a relationship with Jesse, and that she understands that what he did was the right thing. Jesse goes back home and renews his correspondence with Zibby. The film ends with Zibby lying down reading Songs of Innocence and of Experience which she received via courier from Jesse, and Ana lying on Jesse's chest, them happily talking about growing old.

== Cast ==
- Josh Radnor as Jesse Fisher
- Elizabeth Olsen as Elizabeth "Zibby"
- Richard Jenkins as Peter Hoberg, a retiring professor
- Allison Janney as Judith Fairfield, a romantics professor
- John Magaro as Dean, a depressed student
- Zac Efron as Nat, an eccentric student
- Elizabeth Reaser as Ana, a bookseller
- Kate Burton as Susan, Zibby's mother
- Robert Desiderio as David, Zibby's father
- Gregg Edelman as Robert
- Michael Weston as Miles, Jesse's friend (in deleted scenes)
- Ali Ahn as Venessa

== Filming ==
The majority of scenes were filmed at Kenyon College in Gambier, Ohio. Kenyon is the real life alma mater of both Radnor and co-star Allison Janney.

== Reception ==
Liberal Arts received generally positive reviews and has a rating of 71% on Rotten Tomatoes based on 113 reviews with an average score of 6.56 out of 10. The consensus states: "While it's hard not to wish it had a little more bite, Liberal Arts ultimately succeeds as a good-natured – and surprisingly clever – look at the addictive pull of nostalgia for our youth." The film also has a score of 55 out of 100 on Metacritic based on 24 reviews, indicating "mixed or average" reviews.

Roger Ebert of the Chicago Sun-Times gave the film 3 and a half out of 4 stars and stated in his review:

"Liberal Arts is an almost unreasonable pleasure about a jaded New Yorker who returns to his alma mater in Ohio and finds that his heart would like to stay there. It's the kind of film that appeals powerfully to me; to others, maybe not so much.

"There is a part of me that will forever want to be walking under autumn leaves, carrying a briefcase containing the works of Shakespeare and Yeats and a portable chess set. I will pass an old tree under which once on a summer night I lay on the grass with a fragrant young woman and we quoted e.e. cummings back and forth. There is a word to explain why this particular film so appealed to me. Reader, that word is 'escapism.' If you understand why I used the word 'reader' in just that way, you are possibly an ideal viewer for this movie."

=== Accolades ===
Award	Date of ceremony	Category	Recipient(s)	Result	Ref.
Valladolid International Film Festival	October 27, 2012	Golden Spike	Liberal Arts	Nominated	
Georgia Film Critics Association	January 18, 2013	Best Ensemble	The cast of Liberal Arts	Nominated	
