= Thirst Street =

2017 film directed by Nathan Silver

- Theatrical release poster
- Directed by: Nathan Silver
- Written by: Nathan Silver; C. Mason Wells
- Produced by: Ruben Amar; Louise Bellicaud; Joshua Blum; Claire Charles-Gervais; Matthew Edward Ellison; Katie Stern; C. Mason Wells
- Starring: Lindsay Burdge; Damien Bonnard; Esther Garrel; Lola Bessis; Jacques Nolot; Françoise Lebrun; Cindy Silver; Valerie Laury
- Cinematography: Sean Price Williams
- Edited by: Hugo Lemant; John Magary
- Production companies: Papermoon Films; In Vivo Films; Industry Standard Films; Maudit Films; Salem Street Entertainment; The Third Generation; UnLTD Productions; Washington Square Films; Yellow Bear Films; Solab
- Distributed by: Samuel Goldwyn Films (United States); Stray Dogs (France)
- Release dates: April 21, 2017 (Tribeca); September 20, 2017 (United States); July 25, 2018 (France)
- Running time: 82 minutes
- Countries: United States; France
- Languages: English; French

Thirst Street is a 2017 black comedy film directed by American filmmaker Nathan Silver, from a screenplay by Silver and C. Mason Wells. Co-produced by American and French companies, and featuring American and French actors, it is set in Paris. It stars Lindsay Burdge, Damien Bonnard, Esther Garrel, Lola Bessis, Jacques Nolot, Françoise Lebrun, Cindy Silver, Valerie Laury, and Anjelica Huston. The film is about an American woman who falls in love with a French man after a one-night stand. She decides to doggedly pursue him despite his lack of interest. It includes portions in both English and French.

Thirst Street had its world premiere in New York at the Tribeca Film Festival on April 21, 2017. It was released in the United States on September 20, 2017, by Samuel Goldwyn Films, and on July 25, 2018, in France by Stray Dogs.

== Plot ==
Gina (Lindsay Burdge) is an American flight attendant in her mid-30s who is still coming to terms with the suicide of her boyfriend (played in flashbacks by Damien Bonnard). During a layover in Paris, she and two of her co-workers head toward a recommended cabaret but find it to be a strip club. There she meets the manager, Jérôme (Bonnard); she is drawn to him in part because of his resemblance to her late boyfriend. The two have a one-night stand, and she goes back the next day. The two have sex again.

On a whim, Gina quits her job, moves to Paris, and rents an apartment across from Jérôme's club; she also takes a job as a waitress there, all to be closer to him. However, Jérôme grows increasingly uncomfortable with her presence. He rekindles his on-again, off-again relationship with his girlfriend, Clémence, a rock singer, and eventually proposes to her.

Depressed, Gina stops paying rent and skips work, leading her to lose both her apartment and job. Determined to be with Jérôme, she lies to him about being pregnant. Upon discovering the truth, Jérôme flees Gina, runs into the street, and is hit by a car, falling into a coma. At the hospital, Gina claims to be Jérôme's fiancée. The hospital staff give her his belongings, including the engagement ring intended for Clémence, which Gina wears with pride.

== Cast ==
- Lindsay Burdge as Gina
- Damien Bonnard as Jerome
- Esther Garrel as Clémence
- Lola Bessis as Charlie
- Jacques Nolot as Franz
- Françoise Lebrun as Landlady
- Cindy Silver as Lorraine
- Valerie Laury as Faye
- Alice de Lencquesaing as Sophie
- Anjelica Huston as Narrator

== Production ==
In May 2016, it was announced Lindsay Burdge, Damien Bonnard, Lola Bessis, Alice de Lencquesaing and Cindy Silver joined the cast of the film, with Nathan Silver directing the film from a screenplay he co-wrote with C. Mason Wells, a frequent collaborator. Producers were announced as Claire-Charles Gervais, Katie Stern, Ruben Amar, Lola Bessis, Josh Mandel, and Matthew Edward Ellison, will serve as producers on the film, but some changed before it was completed. In March 2017, it was announced Anjelica Huston would narrate the film.

== Release ==
The film had its world premiere at the Tribeca Film Festival on April 21, 2017. Shortly after, Samuel Goldwyn Films acquired distribution rights to the film. It was released on September 20, 2017, in the United States, and July 25, 2018, in France.

=== Critical reception ===
Thirst Street received positive reviews from film critics. It holds a 75% approval rating on review aggregator website Rotten Tomatoes, based on 6 reviews, with a weighted average of 9/10.

Joule Zelman of The Stranger wrote, "But [Lindsay] Burdge plays Gina as a devastated, rootless woman rather than male paranoia given flesh. Somehow, her acting combines with cinematography straight from an artsy 1970s porno and a soundtrack of woozy love songs to create an expressionist portrait of overwhelming loneliness."
