= Mary Page Marlowe =

Play by Tracy Letts

- Original language: English
- Written by: Tracy Letts
- Characters: Mary Page
- Genre: Drama

Premiere
- Date: April 10, 2016
- Place: Steppenwolf Theatre Company

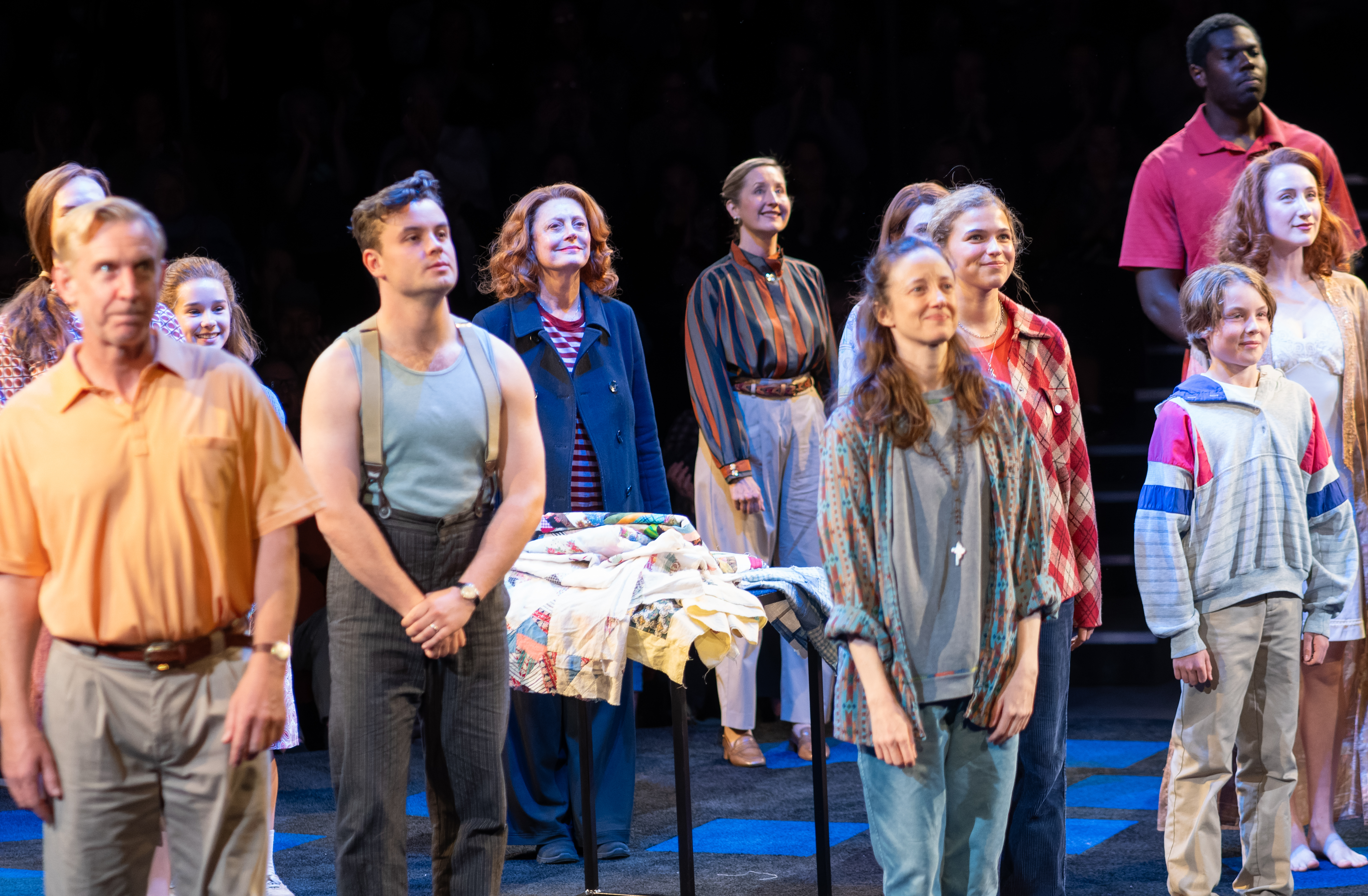
Mary Page Marlowe - Old Vic Theatre - Thursday 25th September 2025

Mary Page Marlowe is a play by Tracy Letts. Told out of chronological order, it follows the title character as played by six actresses and one doll. The play premiered in 2016 in Chicago at Steppenwolf Theatre Company and received a citation for the 2017 Harold and Mimi Steinberg/ATCA New Play Award.

== Plot ==
The play opens with Mary, a 40 year-old accountant, telling her children that she is divorcing their father and moving from Dayton, Ohio, to Kentucky. Her past is subsequently shown, with Mary in conflict with her own mother. Later in life she deals with the fallout from three DUI (Driving Under the Influence) convictions.

== Production history ==
=== 2016 Chicago premiere ===
Mary Page Marlowe premiered in April 2016 at Chicago's Steppenwolf Theatre. Mary was played in the original production by Caroline Heffernan (age 12), Annie Munch (19), Carrie Coon (27, 36), Rebecca Spence (40, 44), Laura T. Fisher (50), and Blair Brown (59, 63, 69). In previews the infant Mary was played by three actual babies, but unease among the audience convinced director Anna D. Shapiro that using a doll would be less distracting.

=== 2018 Off-Broadway production ===
Mary Page Marlowe opened Off-Broadway in New York City at the Tony Kiser Theater on July 12, 2018, in a production by the Second Stage Theater. Previews had started on June 19. Lila Neugebauer directed. In this production the title character was played by Brown (age 59,63, and 69), Emma Geer (age 19), Tatiana Maslany (age 27 and 36), Susan Pourfar (age 40 and 44), Mia Sinclair Jenness (age 12), and Kellie Overbey (age 50). Other members of the cast included Audrey Corsa, Grace Gummer, Brian Kerwin, and Gary Wilmes. The play's run was extended to August 19, running a week longer than originally planned. For her performance, Brown was nominated for a Lucille Lortel Award.

=== 2025 London production ===
On July 1st 2025, it was announced that Mary Page Marlowe would have its UK premiere at The Old Vic in London from September 23rd until November 1st, directed by Matthew Warchus and to be presented in-the-round. It was also announced that the titular role would be played by Susan Sarandon (age 59, 63, and 69) and Andrea Riseborough (age 40, 44, and 50). It was later announced that the titular role would also be played by Rosy McEwen (age 27 and 36), Eleanor Worthington-Cox (age 19), and Alisha Weir (age 12). It was also announced that other members of the cast would include Gilbert Kyem Jnr, Melanie La Barrie, Kingsley Morton, Hugh Quarshie, Ronan Raftery, Paul Thornley, and Lauren Ward.

== Cast and characters ==
Character	Chicago	Off-Broadway	London
Character	2016	2018	2025
Age 12	Caroline Heffernan	Mia Sinclair Jenness	Alisha Weir
Age 19	Annie Munch	Emma Geer	Eleanor Worthington-Cox
Age 27, 36	Carrie Coon	Tatiana Maslany	Rosy McEwen
Age 40, 44	Rebecca Spence	Susan Pourfar	Andrea Riseborough
Age 50	Laura T. Fisher	Kellie Overbey	Andrea Riseborough
Age 59, 63, 69	Blair Brown	Blair Brown	Susan Sarandon

== Accolades ==
=== 2016 Chicago production ===
Year	Award	Category	Nominee	Result	Ref.
2017	American Theatre Critics Association Award	Harold and Mimi Steinberg/ATCA New Play Award	Tracy Letts	Nominated	

=== 2018 Off-Broadway production ===
Year	Award	Category	Nominee	Result	Ref.
2019	Lucille Lortel Award	Outstanding Featured Actress in a Play	Blair Brown	Nominated	
