= The Great Pretender (film) =

- Directed by: Nathan Silver
- Written by: Jack Dunphy
- Story by: Jack Dunphy; Nathan Silver
- Produced by: Nathan Silver; Matt Grady; Danelle Eliav; Jack Dunphy; Jere B. Ford
- Starring: Esther Garrel; Keith Poulson; Maelle Poesy; Linas Phillips
- Cinematography: Sean Price Williams
- Edited by: Jack Dunphy
- Music by: Seth Kaplan
- Production company: BRICTV
- Distributed by: Factory 25
- Release date: April 21, 2018 (Tribeca)
- Running time: 71 minutes
- Country: United States
- Language: English

The Great Pretender is a 2018 American black comedy-drama film, directed by Nathan Silver, from a screenplay by Jack Dunphy, from a story by Dunphy and Silver. It stars Esther Garrel, Keith Poulson, Maelle Poesy and Linas Phillips.

The film had its world premiere at the Tribeca Film Festival on April 21, 2018.

== Cast ==
- Esther Garrel as Thérése
- Keith Poulson as Chris
- Maelle Poesy as Mona
- Linas Phillips as Nick
- Julian Grady as Henry
- Danelle Eliav as Hannah
- C. Mason Wells as David
- Brigitte Sy as Thérése's Mom
- Peter Vack as Adrian

== Production ==
In August 2017, it was announced Nathan Silver would direct the series, written by Jack Dunphy, with BricTV producing. It was later edited into a feature film.

== Release ==
The film had its world premiere at the Tribeca Film Festival on April 21, 2018. It will also screen at AFI Fest in November 2018. Factory 25 will distribute the film.
