= Nathan Silver =

American independent filmmaker

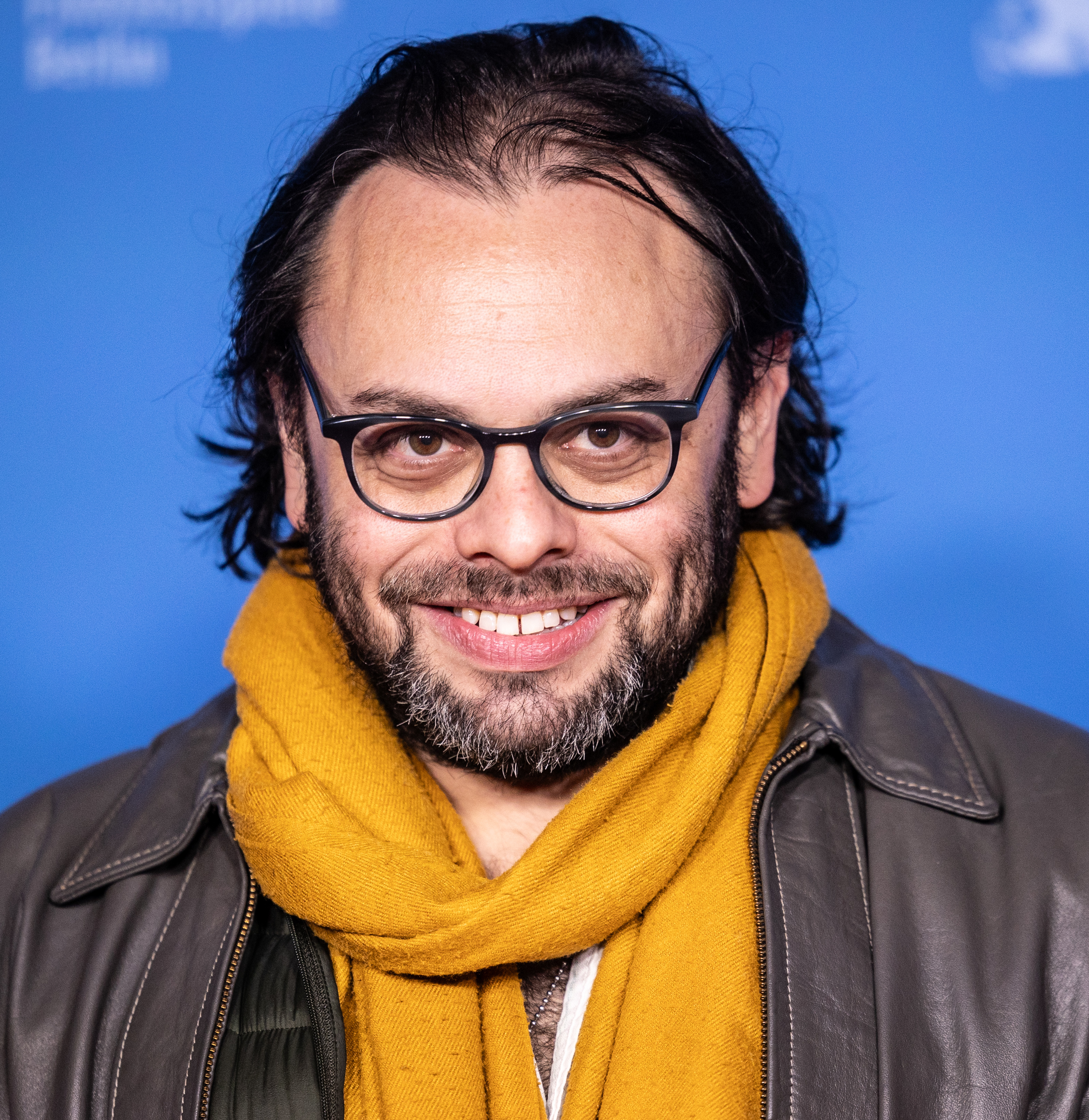
- Silver at the Berlinale 2024
- Education: New York University Tisch School of the Arts
- Occupation: Filmmaker
- Years active: 2006–present
- Spouse: Nicole Fuentes (m. 2022)

Nathan Silver is an American independent filmmaker working out of New York City. He released eight consecutive feature films in as many years. His style includes working primarily with friends and family as actors in his films. He is best known for his films Between the Temples (2024), Thirst Street (2017), and The Great Pretender (2018), and the television series Cutting My Mother.

== Early life ==
Nathan Silver is the son of Cindy Silver, who often appears as an actress in his films. Silver is Jewish, which his work often explores and comments on. As a teenager he was mostly interested in poetry and playwriting. He went on to major in playwriting at New York University Tisch School of the Arts, where he graduated from in 2005. After college, he interned for Richard Foreman at the Ontological-Hysteric Theater.

== Career ==
At the age of 25, Silver directed The Blind, which was shot on 35mm film and had a short festival run. Starting in 2012 he began a prolific period of creation, directing and releasing a film every year until 2019. Exit Elena, Soft in the Head, Uncertain Terms, Stinking Heaven, and Actor Martinez were all released at this time and played at festivals both domestic and abroad.

Thirst Street premiered at the Tribeca Film Festival in 2017. With a script co-authored by C. Mason Wells, the film stars Lindsay Burdge as an unstable American flight attendant who pursues a French man in Paris after a one-night stand. Filmed on location with Sean Price Williams acting as Director of Photography, the film proved to be Silver's biggest success to date. It was released by Samuel Goldwyn Films.

A year later, in 2018, The Great Pretender premiered at Tribeca before being picked up by Factory 25. The black comedy-drama tells the story of a French theater director (played by Esther Garrel), her ex-boyfriend and the two actors playing versions of them in a stage play she is directing.

In 2023, Silver went into production on Between the Temples, a comedy, starring Jason Schwartzman and Carol Kane, that follows the story of a neurotic Cantor and an adult Bat Mitzvah student. The script was co-written by C. Mason Wells and filming took place in Kingston, New York. The film premiered at the 2024 Sundance Film Festival and was later acquired by Sony Pictures Classics for distribution.

== Personal life ==
Silver cites the films of Rainer Werner Fassbinder, Douglas Sirk, Nicholas Ray and Pier Paolo Pasolini as major influences.

In June 2022, Silver married New York based dancer and choreographer Nicole Fuentes.

== Filmography ==
| Year | Title | Director | Writer | Producer | Editor |
|---|---|---|---|---|---|
| 2009 | The Blind | Yes | Yes | No | No |
| 2012 | Exit Elena | Yes | Yes | Yes | Yes |
| 2013 | Soft in the Head | Yes | Yes | Yes | Yes |
| 2014 | Uncertain Terms | Yes | Yes | Yes | No |
| 2015 | Stinking Heaven | Yes | Yes | No | No |
| 2016 | Actor Martinez | Yes | Yes | No | No |
| 2015 | Riot | Yes | —N/a | Yes | No |
| 2017 | Thirst Street | Yes | Yes | No | No |
| 2018 | The Great Pretender | Yes | Yes | Yes | No |
| 2019 | Cutting My Mother | Yes | —N/a | Yes | No |
| 2024 | Watch Me Drown | Yes | Yes | No | No |
| 2024 | Between the Temples | Yes | Yes | No | No |
| 2025 | Carol & Joy | Yes | —N/a | No | No |
