= Happythankyoumoreplease =

- Theatrical release poster
- Directed by: Josh Radnor
- Written by: Josh Radnor
- Starring: Malin Åkerman; Tony Hale; Zoe Kazan; Kate Mara; Josh Radnor; Pablo Schreiber
- Cinematography: Seamus Tierney
- Edited by: Michael R. Miller
- Production company: Tom Sawyer Entertainment
- Distributed by: Anchor Bay Films
- Release dates: January 20, 2010 (Sundance); March 4, 2011
- Running time: 99 minutes
- Country: United States
- Language: English
- Box office: $951,016

Happythankyoumoreplease is a 2010 comedy-drama film written and directed by Josh Radnor in his directorial debut. The film features Radnor, Malin Åkerman, Kate Mara, Zoe Kazan, Michael Algieri, Pablo Schreiber, and Tony Hale, in the story of a group of young New Yorkers, struggling to balance love, friendship, and their encroaching adulthoods.

Happythankyoumoreplease premiered at the 26th Sundance Film Festival in 2010, where it was nominated for the Grand Jury Prize and won the Audience Award. On March 4, 2011, it was released in theaters throughout Los Angeles and New York.

== Plot ==
In New York City, Sam Wexler is a writer on the verge of turning 30 and is unsuccessfully trying to get his first novel published. On the subway, he meets foster care child Rasheen and decides to take the boy in for a few days. Meanwhile, Sam's best friend Annie, a woman struggling with hair loss due to the autoimmune disorder alopecia, tries to find a reason to be loved. Sam's cousin Mary Catherine considers leaving New York for California after her boyfriend Charlie tells her about a promising job offer in Los Angeles. When Mary finds out she is pregnant, her decision to stay or leave becomes complicated. Sam also meets Mississippi, an aspiring singer who is trying to make it in the city and works at a cabaret.

Sam's attempt to return young Rasheen to the social services fails when the boy is determined not to re-enter the foster care program. Determined to help, Sam tries to adopt Rasheen, but botches the application process in a fashion that ends in his brief arrest. Rasheen is finally placed with a new foster family, but Sam keeps tabs on his new situation, including providing the boy with drawing materials when he learns of his artistic abilities. Sam also works on bringing Mississippi into his life, with several setbacks, but by the film’s end, their relationship seems to be on solid ground.

== Cast ==
- Josh Radnor as Sam Wexler
- Malin Åkerman as Annie
- Kate Mara as Mississippi
- Pablo Schreiber as Charlie
- Zoe Kazan as Mary Catherine
- Michael Algieri as Rasheen
- Tony Hale as Sam #2
- Jakob Appelman as School Boy
- Bram Barouh as Spencer
- Dana Barron as The Gynecologist
- Sunah Bilsted as Receptionist
- Jimmy Gary Jr. as Officer Jones
- Richard Jenkins as Paul Gertmanian
- Marna Kohn as Melissa

== Production ==
Radnor wrote the film while working on the first and second seasons of the CBS sitcom How I Met Your Mother. Radnor's script had appeared on the 2007 Black List, a list of the most "liked" unproduced film scripts. Radnor had actors read for roles, wrote revisions, and sought financing for two years. Radnor received financing in April 2009 and began shooting in July 2009 in New York City, after six weeks of pre-production.

Myriad Pictures bought the international distribution rights for the film. The publisher Hannover House bought the North American distribution rights, but the rights were later acquired by Anchor Bay Films.

== Release ==
Happythankyoumoreplease was selected to screen at the 26th Sundance Film Festival, where it premiered on January 22, 2010. At the festival, the film won the Audience Award in the Dramatic category. The film was also screened as part of the Gen Art Film Festival in New York City on April 7, 2010.

The film went into limited theatrical release on March 4, 2011, opening in theaters in New York City and Los Angeles. The film grossed $216,110 in the United States. One month after its US theatrical release, Happythankyoumoreplease opened in Spain where it did comparatively better, grossing $551,472.

It was released by Anchor Bay Entertainment on DVD and Blu-ray disc on June 21, 2011.

== Reception ==
The film received mixed reviews. On Rotten Tomatoes, it has an approval rating of 43% based on 54 reviews, with an average rating of 5.3/10. Metacritic assigned the film a score of 45 out of 100 based on 21 critics, indicating "mixed or average" reviews.

Wesley Morris of The Boston Globe wrote though the film is "frequently funny and occasionally brilliant", the subplot with Rasheen is underdeveloped and "treats Rashaan [sic] like a puppy, a token of Sam’s worthiness as a person." Morris lamented that Radnor "raises the possibility of a better, more complicated film about guilt and ambition and self-doubt", but stops short of exploring these themes.

John Anderson of Variety praised the production values and the performance of Åkerman, but wrote "the characters are uniformly annoying, their stories insubstantial and the tone one of smug contentment." Writing for the Los Angeles Times, Sam Adams critiqued the film’s plot contrivances and commented, "Treating their problems like they’re the most important crises in the world is what people in their 20s do, but that doesn’t mean we have to go along for the ride."

Mark Jenkins of NPR was more positive, writing it "is among the better [Woody] Allen knockoffs of recent years, even if a few of its riffs seem hazardously off-key." Mick LaSalle of the San Francisco Chronicle praised the film and wrote, "There's a point in life where being young starts to get old, but being adult seems like too much of a risk, and Happythankyoumoreplease presents people at that juncture - right before they take the leap. It's an observant and heartfelt film, with turns of dialogue that show that writer-director Josh Radnor really can write."

=== Accolades ===
Award	Date of ceremony	Category	Recipient(s)	Result	Ref.
Sundance Film Festival	January 31, 2010	Grand Jury Prize: Dramatic	Happythankyoumoreplease	Nominated	
Sundance Film Festival	January 31, 2010	Audience Award: U.S. Dramatic	Happythankyoumoreplease	Won	
Georgia Film Critics Association	January 17, 2012	Breakthrough Award	Josh Radnor	Nominated	
Georgia Film Critics Association	January 17, 2012	Best Supporting Actress	Kate Mara	Nominated	
