= Rick Rickertsen =

American film producer

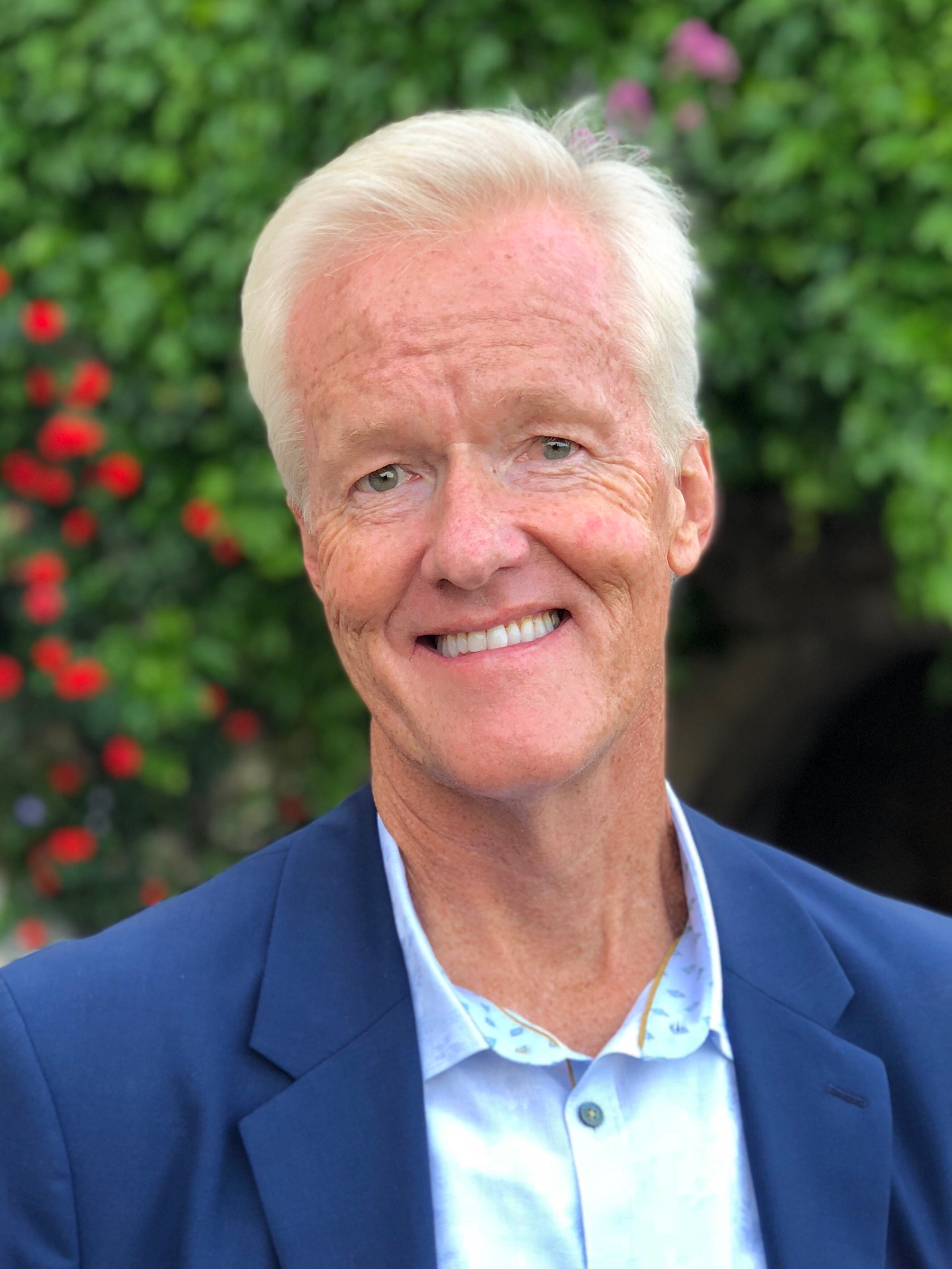
Rick Rickertsen

Carl John Rickertsen (born April 1, 1960), known as Rick Rickertsen, is an American film producer, author, and private equity investor. He is a Partner of Star Thrower Entertainment and Managing Partner of private equity firm Pine Creek Partners. He was formerly Partner and Chief Operating Officer Thayer Capital Partners, a Washington, DC–based private equity firm with over $1.5 billion of capital under management. He has published two business books and written six motion picture screenplays.

Rickertsen has also served as Chairman and Director of numerous public and private company boards, with current engagements including MicroStrategy, Berry Global, and Apollo Senior Floating Rate Fund.

== Early life and education ==
Rickertsen was born and raised in Southern California and attended Katella High School. He is a graduate, with distinction, of Harvard Business School and Stanford University.

== Career ==
As an industrial engineer at Stanford, Rickertsen worked at IBM. Upon graduation, he worked as an analyst in the high technology group at Morgan Stanley in New York and London for two years before matriculating at Harvard Business School.

=== Private equity ===
Rickertsen started his private equity career at Brentwood Associates and was later a partner at Hancock Park Associates, a private equity firm specializing in small, family-held companies.

In 1994, he became the Chief Operating Officer and Partner of Thayer Capital Partners, a Washington, DC–based late-stage private equity firm. He founded three institutional funds totaling $1.5 billion and led investments in ten portfolio companies generating IRRs of approximately 25%. Investors included corporate pension funds, states, governments, and banks.

Rickertsen founded Pine Creek Partners in 2005 with a $54 million private equity fund targeting small, non-technology management buyouts with investors including banks, finance companies, and over 15 CEOs.

=== Business books ===
Rickertsen has published two business books based on his industry experience, Buyout: The Insider's Guide to Buying Your Own Company and Sell Your Business Your Way: Getting Out, Getting Rich, and Getting on with Your Life.

Acclaimed writer Michael Lewis, who wrote the forewords to both books, said of Buyout, "Only insiders know how this stuff works. Rickertsen is an insider. He brings the complexity of high finance to its knees and leaves it begging for mercy. He explains its inner workings so that even a journalist can understand them."

Other high-profile leaders echoed this sentiment in their reviews.

NFL and political legend Jack Kemp said that "Rick is one of America's most gifted buyout experts. Anyone interested in an inside look of the buyout world and the opportunities for managers in these deals will learn volumes from this book."

Goldman Sachs CEO David Solomon wrote, "This is a comprehensive guide for any business owner, large or small, on how to strategize on the sale and maximize value for their companies. And it is written in accessible terms without a lot of Wall Street jargon. It is a valuable resource."

Former Secretary of Defense William S. Cohen wrote, "Rick Rickertsen is one of the most insightful and thoughtful finance professionals I have known. His newest book will become the blueprint for selling companies on the best terms and prices. It is a very smart read by a very gifted writer and thinker."

Marriott International Executive Chairman Bill Marriott wrote, "I worked with Rick when we acquired Ritz-Carlton. He's an excellent deal maker and has written a must-read for every manager with the dream of buying and running his own company. It's a tremendous asset."

Investor David Bonderman, founder of the Texas Pacific Group, suggested that "After reading Rickertsen's insider view on leveraged deals, no one in America will want to work for wages again."

Finally, as a member of the Entrepreneurship Faculty at the Wharton School, Dr. Terrence LaPier predicted that Buyout was "Likely to become the essential manual for management buyouts. This high-impact book will be required reading for every entrepreneurial-minded MBA, manager, seller of a company, and professional in the buyout and M&A business."

Buyout has been translated into four languages and sold over 100,000 copies. It remains in print after nearly 20 years in the market.

=== Film production ===
Rickertsen is a partner and producer at Star Thrower Entertainment, a Los Angeles–based film and television finance and production company that has produced films such as The Post, Wind River, Ingrid Goes West, and LBJ.

Ingrid Goes West won the Waldo Salt Screenwriting Award at the Sundance Film Festival in 2017, as well as the Best First Feature award at the Independent Spirit Awards in 2018.

In 2019 and 2020, Star Thrower developed and produced King Richard, with Will Smith starring as Venus and Serena Williams’ father, Richard Williams.

== Bibliography ==
Buyout: The Insider’s Guide to Buying Your Own Company - AMACOM (ISBN 0814431712, 2001)

Sell Your Business Your Way: Getting Out, Getting Rich, and Getting on with Your Life - AMACOM (ISBN 0814408966, 2006)

== Filmography ==
Year	Film	Notes
2016	The Good Neighbor	Co-Producer
2016	LBJ	Co-Producer
2017	Ingrid Goes West	Executive Producer
2018	Welcome Home	Executive Producer
2019	Villains	Co-Producer
2020	King Richard	Producer
