= Mark Heyman =

American screenwriter and film producer (born 1979)

Mark Heyman (born 1979) is an American screenwriter and film producer who is best known for co-writing Black Swan (2010), The Skeleton Twins (2014), and The Boogeyman (2023). Heyman began his career as a director of development. He co-produced the film The Wrestler (2008) and then turned his hand to scriptwriting. He wrote Black Swan, which received five nominations at the 83rd Academy Awards. He co-wrote the film The Skeleton Twins (2014) which won the Waldo Salt screenwriting award at the Sundance Film Festival. Heyman went on to create and executive produce the streaming television series Strange Angel and write the final shooting script for The Boogeyman (2023).

== Early life ==
Mark Heyman grew up in New Mexico. He attended Brown University, where he majored in modern culture and media. After graduating from Brown in 2002, he enrolled in New York University's film program as a graduate student.

== Career ==
After graduating from NYU, Heyman became a director of development for Prøtøzøa Pictures, the production company of filmmaker Darren Aronofsky. He was a co-producer on Aronofsky's 2008 film The Wrestler about an aging wrestler. After working on The Wrestler, Heyman moved away from producing films in favor of writing them.

He went on to write Black Swan, a psychological thriller set in the world of ballet, which was directed by Aronofsky and released in 2010, based on a script called The Understudy by Andres Heinz. Black Swan was well received by critics and audiences, earning 5 Oscar nominations and winning a Best Actress Academy Award for Natalie Portman. Heyman received nominations for a BAFTA Award for Best Original Screenplay and a Writers Guild of America Award for Best Original Screenplay.

Heyman co-wrote The Skeleton Twins, a 2014 film starring Kristen Wiig and Bill Hader as estranged twins, with Craig Johnson, who also directed the film. The film premiered at the Sundance Film Festival and won the Waldo Salt screenwriting award.

Heyman went on to create and executive produce the streaming television series Strange Angel, which was produced by Scott Free and originally developed for AMC before being put into turnaround and picked up by CBS All-Access (which later became Paramount+), as the streamer's first original series. The series ran for two seasons and starred Jack Reynor, Bella Heathcote and Rupert Friend.

Most recently, Heyman wrote the final shooting script for The Boogeyman, based on the short story by Stephen King of the same name and starring Sophie Thatcher and Chris Messina. The film was produced by 21Laps for 20th Century Studios and released in theaters on June 2, 2023 to mixed reviews.
