= Ivan Leshinsky =

Israeli basketball player (born 1947)

Ivan Leshinsky אייבן לישינסקי
Personal information
- Born: February 5, 1947 (age 79) Brooklyn, New York, U.S.
- Listed height: 6 ft 7 in (2.01 m)

Career information
- High school: Midwood (Brooklyn, New York)
- College: LIU Brooklyn (1964–1968)
- NBA draft: 1968: 10th round, 130th overall pick
- Drafted by: Boston Celtics
- Position: Power forward / center
- Stats at Basketball Reference

Ivan Leshinsky (Hebrew: אייבן לישינסקי; born February 5, 1947) is an American-Israeli former basketball player. He played the forward and center positions. He played three seasons in the Israeli Basketball Premier League, and competed for the Israeli national basketball team.

== Biography ==
Leshinsky was born in Brooklyn, New York. He is 6 ft 7 in (201 cm) tall. He later lived in Annapolis, Maryland, starting in 1974, with his wife, Babette, and their son Eric, and after a number of years the family moved to Baltimore, Maryland.

Leshinsky grew up in Brooklyn living on Avenue J and Ocean Avenue, and attended P.S. 193. He then attended Midwood High School ('63) in Brooklyn, where he played center for the basketball team.

He attended Long Island University from 1963 to 1968. Leshinsky played for the LIU Blackbirds in 1967–68. He played in the 1968 National Invitation Tournament quarterfinals in Madison Square Garden in New York City.

Leshinsky was selected by the Boston Celtics in the tenth round (130th pick overall) of 1968 NBA draft. He chose instead to go to Israel to play basketball.

He played three seasons in the Israeli Basketball Premier League, all for Hapoel Tel Aviv, from 1968 to 1971.

Leshinsky also played for the Israeli national basketball team. He competed in the 1969 FIBA European Championship for Men, averaging 14.7 points per game, and at the 1970 Asian Games, at which he won a silver medal with Team Israel.

He later studied at The George Washington University, earning an M.Ed., with a Special Education major.

Starting in 1974 Leshinsky began to work at, and in 1980 became the executive director of, the Chesapeake Foundation for Human Development in Baltimore, which operates programs for youths who are disadvantaged.

In 1990 Leshinsky was named the head basketball coach at the Key School in Annapolis.
