= Tim White (American producer) =

American film producer

- Born: Annapolis, Maryland, U.S.
- Education: Williams College
- Occupation: Film producer
- Years active: 2007–present
- Relatives: Trevor White (brother)

Tim White is an American producer, whose films include King Richard and Ingrid Goes West. He routinely shares producer duties with his brother, Trevor White.

== Early life and education ==
Tim White was born and grew up in Annapolis, Maryland. His mother, Patti, is a documentary film maker and is director and co-founder of the Annapolis Film Festival.

White attended The Key School in Annapolis.

White attended Williams College as an undergraduate, graduating in 2005. While at Williams, he played varsity tennis and won a national championship.

== Career ==
White routinely shares producer duties with his brother, Trevor White.

== Filmography ==
=== Producer ===
- Jamesy Boy (2016)
- The Good Neighbor (2016)
- LBJ (2016)
- A Crooked Somebody (2017)
- Ingrid Goes West (2017)
- Welcome Home (2018)
- Villains (2019)
- The Evening Hour (2020)
- King Richard (2021)
- 8-Bit Christmas (2021)
- Fair Play (2023)
- No One Will Save You (2023)
- Carolina Caroline (2025)
- Eternity (2025)
- Wardriver (2026)
- Atonement (2026)
- Tony (2026)

=== Executive producer ===
- Wind River (2017)
- The Post (2017)

== Recognition and accolades ==
White was invited to join the Academy of Motion Picture Arts and Sciences in 2022, and the Producers Guild of America the same year.

In 2022, White was nominated, along with his brother Trevor and Will Smith, for an Academy Award for Best Picture for King Richard but did not win.

=== Nominations and awards ===
Award	Date	Category	Film	Recipients	Result
Academy Awards	March 27, 2022	Best Picture	King Richard	Tim White, Trevor White, Will Smith	Nominated
Producers Guild of America Awards	March 19, 2022	Best Theatrical Motion Picture	King Richard	Tim White, Trevor White, Will Smith	Nominated
Producers Guild of America Awards	March 19, 2022	Best Television or Streamed Motion Picture	8-Bit Christmas	Tim White, Trevor White, Allan Mandelbaum	Nominated
Black Reel Awards	February 8, 2022	Outstanding Motion Picture	King Richard	Tim White, Trevor White, Will Smith	Won
Independent Spirit Awards	March 3, 2018	Best First Feature	Ingrid Goes West	Jared Goldman, Adam Mirels, Robert Mirels, Aubrey Plaza, Tim White, and Trevor White	Won
