= A Crooked Somebody =

- Theatrical release poster
- Directed by: Trevor White
- Written by: Andrew Zilch
- Produced by: Paul Finkel; Jason Potash; Wayne L. Rogers; Tim White; Trevor White
- Starring: Rich Sommer; Clifton Collins Jr.; Joanne Froggatt; Ed Harris; Amy Madigan; Amanda Crew; Michael Mosley
- Cinematography: Robert Lam
- Edited by: Craig Dewey
- Music by: Andrew Hewitt
- Production companies: Star Thrower Entertainment; Storyboard Entertainment; Synergics Films; Victual Entertainment
- Distributed by: Vertical Entertainment; DirecTV Cinema
- Release dates: June 21, 2017 (Los Angeles); October 5, 2018 (United States)
- Running time: 102 minutes
- Country: United States
- Language: English

A Crooked Somebody is a 2017 American black comedy thriller film directed by Trevor White and written by Andrew Zilch. The film stars Rich Sommer, Clifton Collins Jr., Joanne Froggatt, Ed Harris, Amy Madigan, Amanda Crew, and Michael Mosley.

A Crooked Somebody premiered at the Los Angeles Film Festival on June 21, 2017. It was released through DirecTV Cinema on September 6, 2018, before being released in a limited release on October 5, 2018, by Vertical Entertainment.

== Plot ==
Michael Vaughn (Sommer) is a fake psychic touring the U.S. to promote his "mediumship" and book. Unknown to other audience members, Vaughn's girlfriend Chelsea (Froggatt) participates as a shill for his hoaxes, which have finally alienated his elderly parents (Harris and Madigan). After a recent stop in the Southwest, Chelsea also begins to lose momentum from the dishonesty of Vaughn's work and the lack of money it has generated.

Before heading to a Tucson symposium, Vaughn is knocked out and kidnapped by Nathan (Collins Jr.), who attended the last conference but was reluctant to get a reading. Vaughn learns (while tied to a chair) that Nathan murdered a man named "James Bishop" in a botched mugging, and wants Vaughn to "communicate" with Bishop's spirit. Nathan expresses remorse in the unsolved crime and also wants Vaughn to talk to Bishop's daughter, Stacy, who became a cause célèbre after her father vanished twenty years ago.

Nathan leads Vaughn to the burial site of Bishop's remains; seeing the discovery as a personal opportunity rather than closure for the Bishop family, Vaughn contacts the local news station while authorities excavate the ground for Bishop's remains. Searchers find skeletal traces of Bishop's body, and Vaughn instantly becomes a star psychic. While he waits permission to talk to Stacy, his association with Nathan becomes less a captor/captive relationship and more an accomplice aiding and abetting a fugitive. Chelsea notices Vaughn on national television and begins to see more duplicity, as she believed he was kidnapped and under duress.

After some hesitation, Stacy agrees to a televised reading with Vaughn. She proves him a fraud by identifying events and people that never happened in her life or the way he claimed, specifically a "Miss Angeline", another debunked psychic. The hosts on the show deduce someone (other than a supernatural presence) told Vaughn the location of her father's remains. Angered by the interview, Nathan kidnaps Chelsea and threatens Vaughn to either correct the situation, or he'll turn himself into authorities and confess what's going on.

After tricking Nathan into dropping his knife, Vaughn bludgeons him to death with a torque wrench and disposes of his body. Rather than forgive him for his deceitfulness and start over, Chelsea leaves Vaughn to get arrested by the town's authorities.

Not long after - while serving time in prison - Vaughn notices Chelsea on TV being interviewed by Dr. Phil. It's revealed that she capitalized on Vaughn by writing a bestseller about his confidence tricks.

== Cast ==
- Rich Sommer as Michael Vaughn
- Clifton Collins Jr. as Nathan
- Joanne Froggatt as Chelsea Mills
- Ed Harris as Sam Vaughn
- Amy Madigan as Joyce Vaughn
- Amanda Crew as Stacy Bishop
  - Kate Kilcoyne as Young Stacy
- Michael Mosley as Detective Bill Banning
- Paul Ben-Victor as Detective Zimmer
- Gillian Vigman as Monica Lewis
- Randee Heller as Phyllis
- Audrey Wasilewski as Cynthia
- Kirk Bovill as Earl
- Phil McGraw as himself

== Production ==
In July 2016, it was announced Rich Sommer, Ed Harris, Amy Madigan, and Joanne Froggatt had been cast in the film, with Trevor White directing from a screenplay by Andrew Zilch. White and his brother Tim White served as producers under their Star Thrower Entertainment banner.

== Release ==
The film had its world premiere at the Los Angeles Film Festival on June 21, 2017. The film was scheduled to be released through DirecTV Cinema on September 6, 2018, before being released in a limited release on October 5, 2018, by Vertical Entertainment.

== Reception ==
On the review aggregator website Rotten Tomatoes, 78% of 9 critics' reviews are positive. Metacritic, which uses a weighted average, assigned the film a score of 74 out of 100, based on 8 critics, indicating "generally favorable" reviews.
