= Jared Ian Goldman =

American film and television producer

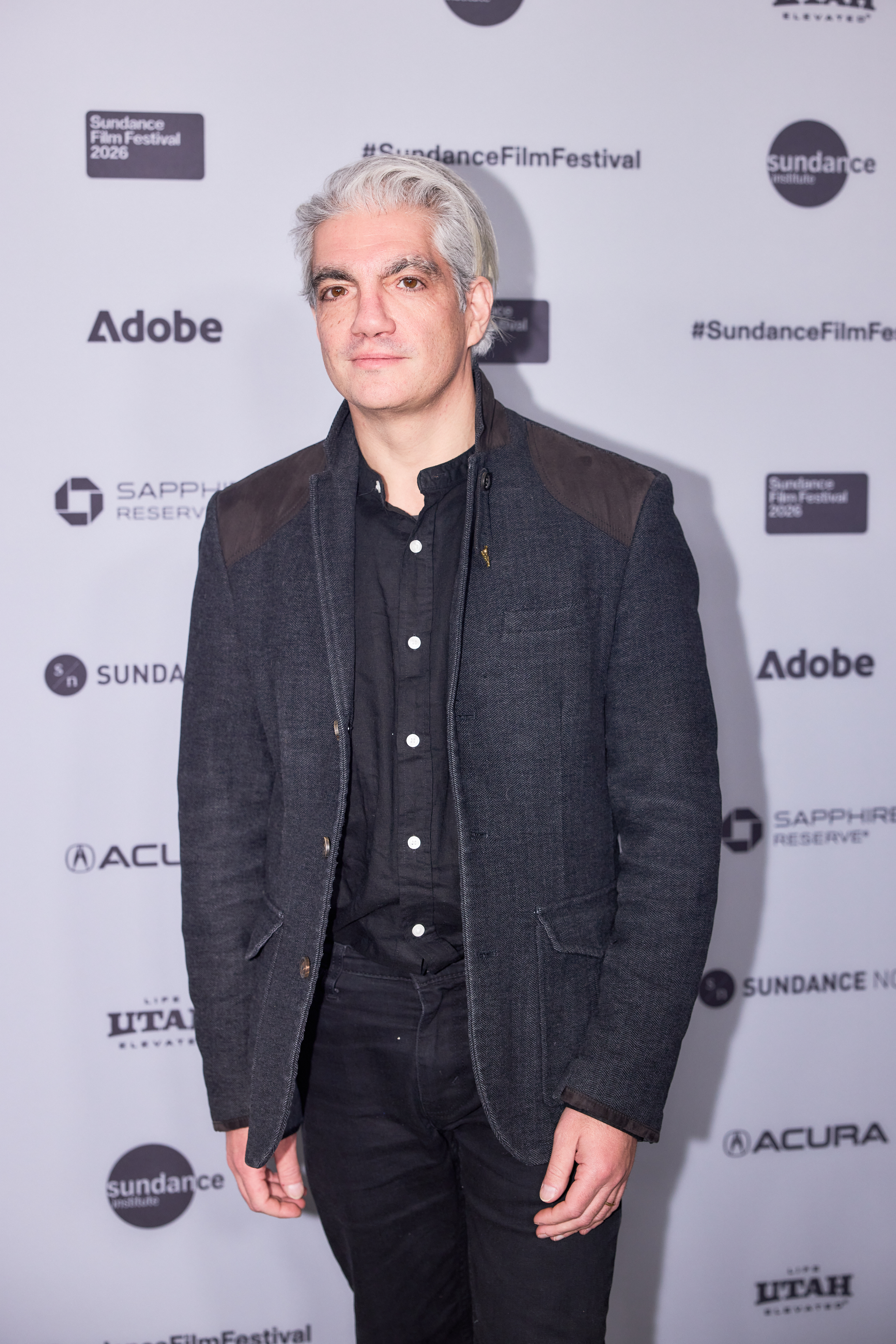
Goldman in 2026

Jared Ian Goldman is an American film and television producer. He is known for his work on the Justin Timberlake starrer Palmer, Antonio Campos' adaptation of The Devil All the Time starring Tom Holland, the film adaptation of Shirley Jackson's masterpiece, We Have Always Lived in the Castle starring Taissa Farmiga, Alexandra Daddario, Sebastian Stan and Crispin Glover, Craig Johnson's Alex Strangelove, the Sundance hit Ingrid Goes West, the Sundance hit The Skeleton Twins, and the Academy Award-nominated Loving. He also produced the second season of The Punisher for the Marvel Cinematic Universe. Other projects include Craig Johnson's adaptation of Daniel Clowes Wilson, Kill Your Darlings starring Daniel Radcliffe, Solitary Man starring Michael Douglas, Rob Reiner's And So It Goes starring Michael Douglas and Diane Keaton, The Wackness, and the Sundance Grand Jury Prize winning documentary Manda Bala (Send a Bullet).

== Life and career ==
Goldman is a graduate of the University of Pennsylvania with a degree in English and Economics. He began his career at Miramax in Acquisitions, Delivery and Business Affairs before moving on to GreeneStreet Films where he was manager of the production department on a wide range of films, including: In the Bedroom, Swimfan, Uptown Girls, Romance & Cigarettes, and A Prairie Home Companion. During his time at GreeneStreet, Goldman worked with Sony Pictures, MGM, Paramount, Fox and Miramax Films.

Goldman departed GreeneStreet in late 2005 to produce Manda Bala (Send a Bullet) would go on to win Grand Jury Prize: Documentary at the 2007 Sundance Film Festival. Following the 2007 win Goldman made the 2008 Sundance Audience Award prize-winning film The Wackness,.

Subsequent films include the Michael Douglas vehicle Solitary Man (2009), Rob Reiner and Morgan Freeman film The Magic of Belle Isle (2012), Kill Your Darlings starring Daniel Radcliffe and directed by John Krokidas (2013), Bill Hader and Kristen Wiig in Craig Johnson's The Skeleton Twins (2014), Diane Keaton with Michael Douglas & Rob Reiner again on And So It Goes (2014), Ruth Negga, Joel Edgerton, and Jeff Nichols on the multi-award-winning film Loving (2016), Woody Harrelson and Laura Dern, with director Craig Johnson again on Wilson (2017), and Aubrey Plaza, Elizabeth Olsen, Billy Magnussen on Ingrid Goes West (2017), which premiered in competition at the 2017 Sundance Film Festival, where it won the Waldo Salt Screenwriting Award and Alex Strangelove - which was written by his frequent artistic collaborator Craig Johnson.

Goldman has also continued to produce documentaries. In 2010 he produced the Dan Hurlin documentary, Puppet, and the Starz film Insha'Allah Democracy, filmmaker Mohammed Ali Naqvi's personal exploration of former exiled Pakistani President Pervez Musharraf and his quest to re-win Pakistan's presidential election. That film was named one of the 12 Must-See Documentaries About Current World Politics by HuffPost.

Goldman is also known for naming the third to final set-up on a given day of film production the “Marcia shot,” in reference to Marcia Brady.

== Personal life ==
Goldman is a member of the National Arts Club, the Producers Guild of America (PGA) and the Directors Guild of America (DGA). He graduated from North Shore High School (New York).

== Selected filmography ==
He was producer for all films unless otherwise noted.

=== Film ===
| Year | Film | Credit |
|---|---|---|
| 2008 | The Wackness | Line producer |
| 2009 | Tenure | Co-producer |
| 2009 | Solitary Man | Co-producer |
| 2010 | Father of Invention | Executive producer |
| 2012 | The Magic of Belle Isle | Executive producer |
| 2012 | Generation Um... | Executive producer |
| 2013 | Kill Your Darlings | Executive producer |
| 2014 | The Skeleton Twins | Executive producer |
| 2014 | And So It Goes | Executive producer |
| 2014 | Adult Beginners | |
| 2016 | Little Boxes | |
| 2016 | Loving | Executive producer |
| 2017 | Ingrid Goes West | |
| 2017 | Wilson | |
| 2017 | Submission | |
| 2018 | Alex Strangelove | |
| 2018 | We Have Always Lived in the Castle | |
| 2020 | All Day and a Night | |
| 2020 | The Devil All the Time | Executive producer |
| 2021 | Palmer | Executive producer |
| 2023 | About My Father | Executive producer |
| 2025 | The Parenting | Executive producer |
| 2026 | In the Blink of an Eye | |

Production manager

| Year | Film | Role | Notes |
|---|---|---|---|
| 2006 | The Insurgents | Production manager | |
| 2007 | Descent | Production manager: Additional photography | Uncredited |
| 2007 | The Visitor | Unit production manager | |
| 2007 | Noise | Production manager | |
| 2008 | The Wackness | Unit production manager | |
| 2012 | The Magic of Belle Isle | Unit production manager | |
| 2014 | And So It Goes | Unit production manager | |
| 2014 | Adult Beginners | Unit production manager | |
| 2018 | Alex Strangelove | Unit production manager | |

Miscellaneous crew

| Year | Film | Role |
|---|---|---|
| 2003 | Uptown Girls | Assistant: Tim Williams |
| 2004 | Yes | Production department manager |
| 2005 | Slow Burn | Production department manager: GreeneStreet Films |
| 2006 | A Prairie Home Companion | Production department manager: GreeneStreet Films |
| 2006 | Wedding Daze | Production associate |

=== Television ===
| Year | Title | Credit |
|---|---|---|
| 2019 | The Punisher | |
| 2022 | Russian Doll | Co-executive producer |

Production manager

| Year | Title | Role |
|---|---|---|
| 2019 | The Punisher | Unit production manager |
| 2022 | Russian Doll | Unit production manager |

Miscellaneous crew

| Year | Title | Role |
|---|---|---|
| 2003 | Angels in America | Office production assistant |
