= Kim Allen (actress) =

American actress

- Born: February 22, 1982 (age 44); Springfield, Massachusetts, U.S.
- Occupations: Film, television actress
- Years active: 2004–present

Kim Allen (born February 22, 1982) is an American actress of half Greek descent.

== Early life ==
Allen was born and raised in a suburb of Springfield, Massachusetts. She earned a BFA in drama from New York University's Tisch School of the Arts, with minors in biology and anthropology.

== Career ==
She formerly played 18-year-old Amanda Holden, Kim Delaney's daughter, in Lifetime's series Army Wives. She later appeared in Law & Order: Criminal Intent as Avery Burton. In the early 2000s, she made an appearance in a Hot Pockets advertisement promoting an updated line including higher quality ingredients. The ad tagline "irresistibly hot", associated her attractiveness with the desirability of the frozen microwaveable sandwich.

In 2016, she played the role of Jacqueline Kennedy in the biographical film LBJ (2016).

== Filmography ==
=== Film ===
Year	Title	Role	Notes
2006	Cosa Bella	Bartender	Short film
2009	8 Easy Steps	Lauren	Short film
2010	Sonnet for a Towncar	Clair	Short film
2010	Violet Tendencies	Salome	
2010	Client 9:The Rise and Fall of Eliot Spitzer	Times Square Lip-Sync Singer	
2011	Going Down in LA-LA Land	Ms Campbell	
2012	Curfew	Maggie	Short film
2013	From the Future with Love	Waitress	Short film
2014	Scavenger Killers	Agent Templeton	
2014	Lyle	Taylor	
2016	LBJ	Jacqueline Kennedy	
2017	Sex Guaranteed	Sandy	

=== Television ===
Year	Title	Role	Notes
2006	The Bedford Diaries	Raven	Television series Episode: "Tell Me No Secrets"
2007–2011	Army Wives	Amanda Holden	10 episodes

Television

- Lipstick Jungle (1 episode, 2008) as Leading Woman
- Law & Order: Criminal Intent (1 episode, 2008) as Avery Hubert
- Guiding Light (4 episodes, 2009) as Lara Fasano
- The Beautiful Life: TBL (1 episode, 2009) as Rachelle
