= Eternity (2025 film) =

2025 American romantic comedy by David Freyne

- Theatrical release poster
- Directed by: David Freyne
- Written by: Pat Cunnane; David Freyne
- Produced by: Tim White; Trevor White
- Starring: Miles Teller; Elizabeth Olsen; Callum Turner; John Early; Olga Merediz; Da'Vine Joy Randolph
- Cinematography: Ruairí O'Brien
- Edited by: Joe Sawyer
- Music by: David Fleming
- Production companies: Apple Original Films; Star Thrower Entertainment
- Distributed by: A24
- Release dates: September 7, 2025 (Toronto); November 26, 2025 (United States)
- Running time: 114 minutes
- Country: United States
- Language: English
- Budget: $12 million
- Box office: $35 million

Eternity is a 2025 American fantasy romantic comedy film directed by David Freyne, who co-wrote the film with Pat Cunnane. The film stars Elizabeth Olsen as a woman forced to choose whom to spend eternity with in the afterlife: her second husband of 65 years, played by Miles Teller, or her first husband who died young, portrayed by Callum Turner. Da'Vine Joy Randolph, John Early, and Olga Merediz appear in supporting roles.

Eternity premiered at the Toronto International Film Festival on September 7, 2025, and was theatrically released in the United States by A24 on November 26, 2025. The film received positive reviews from critics.

== Plot ==
Larry and Joan, an argumentative elderly couple married for 65 years, attend a family gender reveal party. Joan has terminal cancer, which the couple has kept secret. At the party, Larry is shown a picture of Luke, Joan's first husband who died in the Korean War. Larry suddenly chokes while eating a pretzel and dies.

Larry awakens on a train as a young man, soon discovering he is in the afterlife. In a hotel-like space called the Junction, he meets Anna, his assigned Afterlife Coordinator (AC), who informs Larry he must decide where he wants to spend eternity. He learns about the afterlife from Anna and a friendly bartender: each eternity has a unique theme, but all decisions are final, and attempting to escape from one's chosen eternity will result in banishment to the Void, a place of infinite darkness. If Larry does not choose an eternity within seven days, he will need to find employment in the Junction.

Larry waits for Joan for one week, and then chooses a beach-themed eternity; he writes Joan a letter saying he will wait for her there. On his way to the train station, he spots Joan, who has just died and arrived at the Junction as a young woman. The bartender rushes to greet Joan, revealing he is Luke, and has waited for her at the Junction for 67 years. Her two husbands pressure the overwhelmed Joan to decide which of them to spend eternity with; Joan's AC, Ryan, clearly favors Luke.

Because of her special circumstance, Joan is granted permission to sample two eternities—one with Larry and one with Luke—before making her final decision. She accompanies Luke to a mountain-themed eternity; there, they visit the Archives, a building that shows moments from an individual's life. Luke and Joan watch their love story, but Luke becomes upset when he sees that Larry proposed to Joan at the same boat dock where Luke said goodbye to her before heading off to war. Joan then visits the beach-themed eternity with Larry, who refuses to enter the Archives to revisit their life together. Larry tells her that, like Luke, he would have waited for her in the Junction as long as necessary.

Luke finds the letter in which Larry wrote that he had chosen the beach eternity; he shows it to Joan, and she unfavorably compares it to Luke's 67 years of devotion waiting for her in the Junction. Joan struggles with her decision and goes to her recently-deceased friend Karen for emotional support. As Joan and Karen spend the night partying, Luke and Larry bond. Unable to choose between her husbands, Joan opts to join Karen in a Paris-themed eternity.

Larry recalls he was told that souls in the afterlife take on the appearance of the age at which they were happiest. Joan has been wearing her hair long, something she only did during her first marriage, and Larry concludes this means Joan was happier with Luke. Wanting her to be happy, Larry interrupts Joan before she leaves with Karen and tells her to spend Eternity with Luke. Joan and Luke happily begin eternity in the mountains. As time passes, Joan becomes dissatisfied and frequents the Archives in order to relive her memories with Larry. She realizes all the little moments of life with Larry matter more to her than the young love free of hardship and loss that she had with Luke. When Joan decides that she wants to spend eternity with Larry instead, Luke attempts to dissuade her, ultimately fearing she will be lost to the Void. They find closure and together mourn the lives they never had. Luke agrees to act as a decoy, allowing Joan to pass through the Archives to exit eternity. She is confronted by troubled memories of her own past before finding her way back to the Junction.

In the Junction, Joan enlists the help of Ryan and Anna to hide her and find Larry. They discover that Larry remained at the Junction, taking Luke's bartending job and forgoing an eternity without Joan. Larry and Joan reunite and enter a discontinued eternity reminiscent of their earthly life.

== Cast ==
- Miles Teller as Larry Cutler, the man Joan built her life with
  - Barry Primus as old Larry Cutler
- Elizabeth Olsen as Joan Cutler, the woman of Larry's and Luke's affections
  - Betty Buckley as old Joan Cutler
- Callum Turner as Luke, Joan's first husband, who died in the Korean War
- John Early as Ryan, Joan's afterlife coordinator
- Olga Merediz as Karen, a neighbor and friend of Joan who is disliked by Larry
- Da'Vine Joy Randolph as Anna, Larry's afterlife coordinator

== Production ==
Pat Cunnane's script for Eternity was voted onto The Black List of most-liked unproduced screenplays in 2022. In March 2024, David Freyne was hired to direct the film for A24 with Elizabeth Olsen, Miles Teller and Callum Turner signed in to star. Olsen and Teller were also involved in the film as executive producers. In late May, Da'Vine Joy Randolph joined the cast. In June, John Early and Olga Merediz joined the cast. David Fleming composed the score.

Principal photography began on May 24, 2024, in Vancouver, and production wrapped on July 5.

== Release ==
Eternity premiered at the Toronto International Film Festival on September 7, 2025, and was for a nationwide theatrically released in the United States on November 26, 2025. It closed the 61st Chicago International Film Festival on October 26, 2025. It was screened in the Icon section of the Stockholm International Film Festival on November 9, 2025.

== Reception ==
On the review aggregator website Rotten Tomatoes, 76% of 194 critics' reviews are positive, with an average rating of 6.8/10. The website's consensus reads: "Marrying a clever spin on the afterlife with an infectious sweet streak, Eternity is a spiritual successor to classic romantic screwball comedies that's worthy of their company." On Metacritic, which uses a weighted average, the film holds a score of 58/100 based on 36 critics, indicating "mixed or average" reviews. Audiences surveyed by PostTrak gave the film an 84% overall positive score, with 54% saying they would "definitely recommend" it.

Pete Hammond of Deadline praised the film's "bright and fun production design" and "sparkling colorful cinematography", but felt it could use "a little tightening", writing that the middle section "feels like an eternity."

=== Accolades ===
Award	Date of ceremony	Category	Recipient(s)	Result	Ref.
Artios Awards	February 26, 2026	Feature Studio or Independent – Comedy	Tiffany Mak, Chelsea Ellis Bloch, and Marisol Roncal	Nominated	
Critics' Choice Movie Awards	January 4, 2026	Best Comedy	Eternity	Nominated	
San Diego Film Critics Society	December 15, 2025	Best Comedic Performance	Da'Vine Joy Randolph	Won	
Savannah Film Festival	October 25, 2025	Distinguished Performance Award	Miles Teller	Won	
Savannah Film Festival	October 25, 2025	Honored Guest	Da'Vine Joy Randolph	Won	
Society of Composers & Lyricists	February 6, 2026	Outstanding Original Score for an Independent Film	David Fleming	Nominated	

== See also ==
- After Life
- Defending Your Life
