= Key School =

Location
- 534 Hillsmere Drive; Annapolis, Maryland 21403; United States
- 38°55′53″N 76°29′38″W

Information
- Type: Independent school
- Established: 1958; 68 years ago
- Head of school: Matthew Nespole
- Teaching staff: 77.4 (on a FTE basis)
- Grades: Key-Wee (Note: For students aged 2.5–3 years)–12
- Gender: Co-educational
- Enrollment: 662, including 32 PK students (2013–14)
- Student to teacher ratio: 8.1
- Campus type: Suburban
- Mascot: Obezag
- Endowment: $15+ million
- Website: www.keyschool.org

Key School is an independent coeducational school, located in the neighborhood of Hillsmere Shores in Annapolis, Maryland. Key School was established by a group of tutors from St. John's College in 1958. Key is a member of the National Association of Independent Schools (NAIS).

== Notable faculty ==
- Ivan Leshinsky (born 1947), American-Israeli basketball player
- Cynthia Voigt (born 1942), author

== Notable alumni ==
- Tim White, filmmaker
- Trevor White, filmmaker
- Jacob Greene '21, professional soccer player
- Ada Palmer, Historian and Writer
