= Reed Van Dyk =

American filmmaker

- Van Dyk in 2026
- Occupations: Director, screenwriter, editor, producer
- Years active: 2012–present

Reed Van Dyk is an American filmmaker, best known for his film, DeKalb Elementary for which he received an Academy Award for Best Live Action Short Film nomination at the 90th Academy Awards in 2018.

== Filmography ==
- 2014: amateurcouple (Short) (writer, director, producer)
- 2017: DeKalb Elementary (Short) (writer, director, producer)
- 2018: Interior (Short) (writer, director, producer)
- 2026: Atonement (writer, director, producer)
