= Wardriver =

2026 film by Rebecca Thomas

- Theatrical release poster
- Directed by: Rebecca Thomas
- Written by: Daniel Casey
- Produced by: Daniel Casey; Dane DeHaan; Arianne Fraser; Delphine Perrier; Tim White; Trevor White; David M. Wulf
- Starring: Dane DeHaan; Sasha Calle; William Belleau; Karina Gale; Cameron Lee Price; Mamoudou Athie; Jeffrey Donovan
- Cinematography: Htat Htut
- Edited by: Kristi Shimek
- Music by: Mark Hardison Garbett
- Production companies: Highland Film Group; Redline Entertainment; Star Thrower Entertainment
- Distributed by: The Avenue
- Release dates: March 14, 2026 (Cinequest); March 20, 2026 (United States)
- Running time: 94 minutes
- Country: United States
- Language: English
- Box office: $59,225

Wardriver is a 2026 American crime thriller film directed by Rebecca Thomas and written by Daniel Casey. It stars Dane DeHaan, Sasha Calle, William Belleau, Karina Gale, Cameron Lee Price, Mamoudou Athie, and Jeffrey Donovan.

The film premiered at the Cinequest Film & Creativity Festival on March 14, 2026, and was released in the United States in limited theaters on March 20, before being released on video on demand on March 27.

== Cast ==
- Dane DeHaan as Cole
- Sasha Calle as Sarah
- William Belleau as Doug
- Karina Gale as Anna
- Cameron Lee Price as Freddie
- Mamoudou Athie as Oscar
- Jeffrey Donovan as Bilson

== Production ==
=== Development ===
In February 2022, it was announced that Rebecca Thomas would be directing an action thriller film written by Daniel Casey, with Dane DeHaan cast in the lead role, alongside Sophie Turner.

=== Casting and filming ===
Turner had exited the project by September 2024, when principal photography was completed in Utah, and Sasha Calle, William Belleau, Karina Gale, Cameron Lee Price, Mamoudou Athie, and Jeffrey Donovan rounded out the cast. In May 2025, the film was being sold at the Cannes Film Festival.

== Release ==
Wardriver premiered at the Cinequest Film & Creativity Festival on March 14, 2026, and was released in the United States in limited theaters on March 20, before being released on video on demand on March 27.

== Reception ==
On review aggregator website Rotten Tomatoes, the film holds an approval rating of 100% based on 15 reviews, with an average rating of 6.1/10.
