= Trevor White (producer) =

American film producer

- Born: Annapolis, Maryland, U.S.
- Education: Cornell University
- Occupation: Film producer
- Years active: 2007–present
- Relatives: Tim White (brother)

Trevor White is an American film producer, director, and writer. He often works with his brother Tim White, also a producer; their films include King Richard (2021), which won the Black Reel Award for Outstanding Film, and Ingrid Goes West, which won the Independent Spirit Award for Best First Feature.

== Early life and education ==
Trevor White grew up in Annapolis, Maryland, where he attended The Key School. His mother, Patti, is a documentary film maker and is director and co-founder of the Annapolis Film Festival. White attended Cornell University as an undergraduate, graduating in 2007. He was a member of the Sigma Pi fraternity.

== Filmography ==
=== Director/writer ===
- Jamesy Boy (2016)

=== Producer ===
- The Good Neighbor (2016)
- LBJ (2016)
- A Crooked Somebody (2017)
- Ingrid Goes West (2017)
- Welcome Home (2018)
- Villains (2019)
- King Richard (2021)
- 8-Bit Christmas (2021)
- Fair Play (2023)
- No One Will Save You (2023)
- Carolina Caroline (2025)
- Eternity (2025)
- Wardriver (2026)
- Atonement (2026)
- Tony (2026)

=== Executive producer ===
- Wind River (2017)
- The Post (2017)
- The Evening Hour (2020)
- The Water Walker (2020) (short)

== Recognition and accolades ==
White joined the Academy of Motion Picture Arts and Sciences and the Producers Guild of America in 2022, and is also a member of the Directors Guild of America.

In 2022, White was nominated, along with his brother Tim White and Will Smith, for an Academy Award for Best Picture for King Richard but did not win.

=== Awards and nominations ===
Award	Date	Category	Film	Recipients	Result
Academy Awards	March 27, 2022	Best Picture	King Richard	Tim White, Trevor White, Will Smith	Nominated
Producers Guild of America Awards	March 19, 2022	Best Theatrical Motion Picture	King Richard	Tim White, Trevor White, Will Smith	Nominated
Producers Guild of America Awards	March 19, 2022	Best Television or Streamed Motion Picture	8-Bit Christmas	Tim White, Trevor White, Allan Mandelbaum	Nominated
Black Reel Awards	February 8, 2022	Outstanding Motion Picture	King Richard	Tim White, Trevor White, Will Smith	Won
Independent Spirit Awards	March 3, 2018	Best First Feature	Ingrid Goes West	Jared Goldman, Adam Mirels, Robert Mirels, Aubrey Plaza, Tim White, and Trevor White	Won
