= Katella High School =

Location
- 2200 E. Wagner Ave; Anaheim, California 92806; United States; 33°49′25″N 117°53′06″W

Information
- Type: Public
- Motto: "We are Katella, Embracing, Evolving, Empowering for a limitless tomorrow”
- Established: 1966
- Principal: Chuck Hernandez
- Staff: 101.88 (FTE)
- Enrollment: 2,500 (2023-2024)
- Student to teacher ratio: 24.54
- Colors: Scarlet, white and black
- Athletics conference: CIF Southern Section; Golden West League
- Nickname: Knights
- Website: katella.auhsd.us

Katella High School is a public high school in Anaheim, California, located in the Southeast Anaheim region of the city and is part of the Anaheim Union High School District. It serves 2,700 students in grades nine through twelve. The school's mascot is the Knights.

== Notable alumni ==
- Brandon Barnes - Major League Baseball
- Jason Boesel - drummer
- Carl Macek - anime producer, director, writer and performer
- Nick Ramirez - Major League Baseball pitcher
- Ed Royce - U.S. Congress representative
- Loretta Sanchez - U.S. Congress representative
- Jerry Spradlin - Major League Baseball pitcher
- Dave Wilson - National Football League quarterback
- Jaret Wright - Major League Baseball pitcher
- Joe Lacob - Entertainment Executive, Owner of Golden State Warriors
- Rick Rickertsen - Financier, Film Producer of 'King Richard' Board Member MicroStrategy & Stanford Golf
- Brad Eberhard - Artist
- Don Davis - composer
