= True Adolescents =

- Directed by: Craig Johnson
- Written by: Craig Johnson
- Produced by: Rena Bussinger; Laurie Hicks; Gill Holland; Jennifer Lee; Emanuel Michael; Stu Pollard; Thomas Woodrow
- Starring: Mark Duplass; Bret Loehr; Carr Thompson
- Cinematography: Kat Westergaard
- Edited by: Jennifer Lee
- Music by: Peter Golub
- Distributed by: New Video Group
- Release date: March 14, 2009
- Running time: 88 minutes
- Country: United States
- Language: English

True Adolescents is a 2009 American comedy film written and directed by Craig Johnson and starring Mark Duplass, Bret Loehr and Carr Thompson.

It premiered at the 2009 South by Southwest Film Festival, where it was nominated for the narrative feature grand jury prize.

== Plot summary ==
Sam (Mark Duplass) is a washed-up rocker in his mid-30s. Jobless and apartment-less, he crashes with his aunt (Melissa Leo) as a last resort and becomes reluctant camping-trip chaperone to her teenage son and a friend. On the trip, the three males turn out to be on par, maturity-wise. But in the Pacific Northwest wilderness a surprising discovery turns dire—and the distance from boy to man must be covered overnight.

== Cast ==
- Mark Duplass as Sam
- Bret Loehr as Oliver
- Carr Thompson as Jake
- Melissa Leo as Sharon
