= Lyndon B. Johnson in popular culture =

American president Lyndon B. Johnson (LBJ) has been a subject of various works of media and popular culture.

== Television ==
- In the I Dream of Jeannie episode; season 3, episode 13: My Son, the Genie. POTUS visits Maj. Nelson's home. The President is shown twice, from behind only, wearing a western hat, implying it is LBJ, who was president at the time.
- In the sketch comedy show The Whitest Kids U'Know Johnson is portrayed by Sam Brown and is shown encouraging the assassination of John F. Kennedy.
- In an episode of The Venture Bros., Johnson and his wife "Lady Hawk" appear as super villains.
- Johnson appeared as an animated caricature of himself in an episode of The Flintstones entitled, "Shinrock-a-Go-Go", that originally aired on December 3, 1965.
- In the show King of the Hill, Hank Hill's boss Buck Strickland is heavily inspired by Lyndon B. Johnson in terms of look and personality such as his greed and lecherousness.
- Clancy Brown portrays Johnson in season 3 of the Netflix series The Crown.
- Lyndon B. Johnson is portrayed as a preserved talking head in a jar in an episode of the series Futurama.

== Books ==
- In the Odd Thomas series of novels by Dean Koontz, Johnson appears as one of the famous ghosts that haunt the titular character's hometown of Pico Mundo, still wearing the hospital gown he had on when he died. When Johnson realizes Odd can see him, he responds by mooning him.
- In the short story collection Girl with Curious Hair by David Foster Wallace, the piece entitled "Lyndon" describes a large extent of Johnson's political career through his interactions with the narrator, an administrative assistant who rises to become a senior staff member and close friend of Johnson's.
- In Kevin Given's novel "Last Rites: The Return of Sebastian Vasilis" Lyndon Johnson is turned into a vampire. The novel was adapted into a series of comic books "Karl Vincent; Vampire Hunter" and "Files of Karl Vincent" Files of Karl Vincent #1 tells how Lyndon became a vampire.

== Theater ==
- Johnson's rise to the presidency inspired the satirical play MacBird! by Barbara Garson.
- Johnson's relationship with Martin Luther King Jr. and his support of the Voting Rights Act are depicted in Christopher Hampton's play Appomattox, which debuted at the Guthrie Theater in Minneapolis in September 2012.
- Johnson's time in office between the assassination of JFK and his re-election in 1964 is portrayed in the Robert Schenkkan play All the Way. It premiered at the Oregon Shakespeare Festival. It was later followed by a production at the American Repertory Theater starring Bryan Cranston as Johnson. The play won a Tony Award for Best Play in 2014.
- Johnson is portrayed as a Shakespearean hero in the one-man play Reflections of a Tough Texan: The Legacy of Lyndon Johnson by Pierce Wallace, which premiered at the Santa Monica Playhouse in 2025.

== Films ==
- The War Game (1966): never directly named but shown in photographs when narration references the President of the United States.
- In 1968, Ward Kimball directed a two-minute animated short called Escalation, which criticized Lyndon B. Johnson's Vietnam War policy by portraying him as a giant head whose phallic nose rises to erection until it explodes. The short is unique for being the only animated cartoon made independently from the Disney Studios by one of Disney's Nine Old Men. The short is further noticeable for its satirical edge and political and erotic content.
- LBJ (1968): subject of Cuban propaganda film
- The Private Files of J. Edgar Hoover (1977): played by Andrew Duggan
- King (1978, TV): played by Warren J. Kemmerling
- Hair (1979): The song "Initials/LBJ" mentions Johnson in the lyrics repeatedly
- Kennedy (1983, TV): played by Nesbitt Blaisdell
- Blood Feud (1983, TV): played by Forrest Tucker
- The Right Stuff (1983): played by Donald Moffat
- Robert Kennedy & His Times (1985, TV): played by G. D. Spradlin
- Hoover vs. The Kennedys (1987, TV): played by Richard Anderson
- J. Edgar Hoover (1987, TV): played by Rip Torn
- LBJ: The Early Years (1987, TV): played by Randy Quaid
- LBJ (1988, TV PBS): played by Laurence Luckinbill
- JFK (1991): played by Tom Howard and John William Galt (voice)
- A Woman Named Jackie (1991): played by Brian Smiar
- Forrest Gump (1994): archive footage, voice-over by John William Galt
- Thirteen Days (2000): played by Walter Adrian
- Path to War (2002): played by Michael Gambon
- RFK (2002): played by James Cromwell
- The Kennedys (2011): played by Don Allison
- The Butler (2013): played by Liev Schreiber
- Parkland (2013): played by Sean McGraw
- Selma (2014): played by Tom Wilkinson
- All the Way (2016, TV movie): played by Bryan Cranston
- Last Rites: The Return of Sebastian Vasilis (2016) played by David Raizor
- Jackie (2016): played by John Carroll Lynch
- Hillary's America: The Secret History of the Democratic Party (2016): played by Sean McGraw
- LBJ (2016): played by Woody Harrelson

== Music ==
- Many spoken word, comedy, and speeches about LBJ were released on vinyl records.

== Video games ==
- Metal Gear Solid 3: Snake Eater (2004): played by Richard McGonagle.
