= Amateur Gourmet =

American food and humor blogger

Adam Roberts
- Roberts in 2025
- Born: 1979 (age 46–47); United States
- Occupations: Food and humor writer, blogger
- Spouse: Craig Johnson (m. 2015)
- Writing career
- Notable works: The Amateur Gourmet (2007); Secrets of the Best Chefs (2012); ABC's The Real O’Neals (2017); Food Person (2025)

The Amateur Gourmet, or Adam Roberts, is an American food and humor writer, blogger, and author. He has published several books and written for television, such as ABC's The Real O’Neals.

== Biography ==
=== Early life and blog ===
Roberts, born in 1979, started The Amateur Gourmet while a frustrated law student in Atlanta in 2004. Roberts moved to New York in 2005, and published a book based on his blog in 2007.

The blog depends largely on Roberts' own public persona: the Boston Globe describes him as "skinny and nebbishy, with a nasally musical theater voice that would fit perfectly on NPR's This American Life", and combines irreverent accounts of Roberts' own cooking attempts with foodie essays and restaurant reviews. There are also short videos intended to be humorous, such as "Great Moments in Musical Theater Featuring Eggs". Roberts' roommates, friends, and romantic interests were regular characters from early on, but his eccentric family has been featured most prominently, including his celebrity-photographing parents from Boca Raton, Florida.

=== Career ===
Roberts is the author of several books, including The Amateur Gourmet: How to Shop, Chop, and Table-Hop Like a Pro (Almost), Secrets of the Best Chefs, Give My Swiss Chards to Broadway (with Broadway actor Gideon Glick). He has written for film and television, including ABC's The Real O'Neals starring Noah Galvin and Martha Plimpton.

In 2025, Roberts published his first novel from Knopf called Food Person. Already the book has generated positive reviews, including one from Publishers Weekly which called it "a rollicking debut."

=== Personal life ===
Openly gay, Roberts is the husband of screenwriter and film director Craig Johnson.
