= The Skeleton Twins =

- Theatrical release poster
- Directed by: Craig Johnson
- Written by: Craig Johnson; Mark Heyman
- Produced by: Stephanie Langhoff; Jennifer Lee; Jared Ian Goldman; Jacob Pechenik
- Starring: Bill Hader; Kristen Wiig; Luke Wilson; Ty Burrell; Boyd Holbrook
- Cinematography: Reed Morano
- Edited by: Jennifer Lee
- Music by: Nathan Larson
- Production companies: Duplass Brothers Productions; Venture Forth
- Distributed by: Lionsgate Roadside Attractions (United States); Stage 6 Films (International)
- Release dates: January 19, 2014 (Sundance); September 12, 2014 (United States)
- Running time: 93 minutes
- Country: United States
- Language: English
- Budget: $1 million
- Box office: $5.8 million

The Skeleton Twins is a 2014 American comedy drama film directed by Craig Johnson and starring Bill Hader and Kristen Wiig. The film premiered in competition at 2014 Sundance Film Festival on January 18, 2014. It won the Screenwriting Award: U.S. Dramatic at the festival. Wiig and Hader play twins in the film. The film received positive reviews; critics praised Johnson's direction and the performances of Hader and Wiig.

== Plot ==
Maggie is in her bathroom preparing to swallow a handful of pills, but she is interrupted by a phone call from a hospital, informing her that her twin brother Milo, whom she has not seen in 10 years, has attempted suicide. Maggie visits Milo in the hospital in Los Angeles and suggests that he come to stay with her in their childhood hometown of Nyack, New York. He agrees and meets Maggie's husband Lance.

Milo is surprised when Lance tells him that he and Maggie are trying to have a baby, as Maggie never expressed a desire for children. Maggie later confesses to Milo that she's been taking contraceptive pills, both to avoid having a child with Lance and because she had been having sex with her scuba instructor Billy. She worries that she is not worthy of Lance, but Milo reassures her.

Milo reconnects with his high school English teacher Rich, with whom he had a sexual relationship when he was 15. Rich now has a sixteen-year-old son and is dating a woman. Milo and Rich spend the night together. Later, Milo appears at Rich's house while his son is there. This infuriates Rich, who does not want his past exposed. Maggie is also upset with Milo for resuming contact with Rich, as she exposed the relationship to end it as well as Rich's teaching career.

Milo tells Maggie about a boy that had once bullied him, a boy who their father had assured him would reach his peak in high school and have a miserable adult life. But it turns out that the bully has a successful happy life, and it is Milo who had peaked in high school. Maggie asks for reassurance that he will not kill himself, and he promises to try not to.

Lance confides to Milo that he is concerned that he may be infertile. Milo mentions that Maggie used to hide cigarettes around the house, leading Lance to find the contraceptives.

Maggie ends the relationship with Billy and returns home where she is confronted by Lance, who is painfully confused by the birth control pills he has found. She admits to her affairs, then confronts Milo, blaming him for ruining her marriage. Milo retorts that it was no "marriage", and she lashes back suggesting that next time he tries suicide he should do it right. Maggie leaves Milo a voicemail echoing his suicide note and goes to the pool where she had been taking scuba lessons. Tying weights to her body, she jumps into the pool. As she begins to drown, she panics but is unable to free herself. Milo, having heard her message, jumps into the pool and rescues her.

The film closes with the twins in Milo's apartment, looking at their new fish tank filled with goldfish.

== Cast ==
- Bill Hader as Milo Dean, Maggie's brother
- Kristen Wiig as Maggie Dean, Milo's sister
- Luke Wilson as Lance, Maggie's husband
- Ty Burrell as Rich Levitt, Milo's former teacher
- Boyd Holbrook as Billy, Maggie's scuba instructor
- Joanna Gleason as Judy Dean, Maggie and Milo's mother
- Adriane Lenox as Dr. Linda Essex
- Kathleen Rose Perkins as Carlie
- Paul Castro Jr as Eric

== Production ==
The script went through several iterations, including one in which Milo is a drag queen and the film more closely resembles a road trip movie, but eventually Johnson and his writing partner settled on a more low-key approach inspired by the work of Hal Ashby and Alexander Payne. Said Johnson, "Something I wanted to be a part of this movie was brothers and sisters connecting with their secret language. No one can make you laugh harder, [but] no one can [tick] you off more." Writing the film, Johnson wanted to avoid writing along genre lines, as he believes that comedy and drama are both present in everyday life. He has described the theme of the movie as "dealing with dark shit with a sense of humor."

One notable scene features the two main characters lip syncing to "Nothing's Gonna Stop Us Now" by Starship. Initially, the song the writers planned to use was "Hold On" by Wilson Phillips, but as the song had already played a focal point in Bridesmaids, it was decided to choose another song. Accordingly, Johnson "spent 24 hours listening to every cheesy mid-’80s ballad you can think of and looking in the mirror and lip syncing it myself." The fact that "Nothing's Gonna Stop Us Now" is a duet opened up new possibilities: Johnson said, "the scene became a little more epic because it became about Bill’s character getting Maggie (Wiig) to sing Grace Slick’s part".

Principal photography, which began in November 2012 in Brooklyn, New York, took place over 22 days. Although a full script was written, Johnson encouraged improvisation on the set. Johnson has stated that an entirely improvised conversation between Wiig and Wilson involving Vibram shoes was his single favorite scene in the entire film.

== Release ==
The Skeleton Twins opened in a limited release in the United States in 15 theaters and grossed $380,691; the average take per theater was $25,379, and it ranked #25 at the box office. The widest release for the film was 461 theaters, and it ultimately earned $5,279,678 domestically and $468,848 internationally for a total of $5,748,526, above its estimated budget of $1 million.

== Reception ==
On the review aggregator website Rotten Tomatoes, 86% of 165 critics' reviews are positive, with an average rating of 7.0/10. The website's consensus reads: "Led by powerful performances from Kristen Wiig and Bill Hader, The Skeleton Twins effectively mines laughs and tears from family drama." Metacritic, which uses a weighted average, assigned the film a score of 74 out of 100, based on 33 critics, indicating "generally favorable" reviews.

== Accolades ==
List of accolades received by The Skeleton Twins
Year	Award	Category	Recipient(s) and nominee(s)	Result
2014	Edinburgh Film Festival	Audience Award	Craig Johnson	Nominated
2014	Sundance Film Festival	Grand Jury Prize	Craig Johnson	Nominated
2014	Sundance Film Festival	Waldo Salt Screenwriting Award	Mark Heyman, Craig Johnson	Won
2014	Gotham Independent Film Awards	Best Actor	Bill Hader	Nominated
2014	National Board of Review Awards	Top 10 Independent Films		Won
2014	Phoenix Film Critics Society Awards	Overlooked Film of The Year		Nominated
2014	Women Film Critics Circle Awards	Best Comedic Actress	Kristen Wiig	Nominated
2014	Women Film Critics Circle Awards	Best Equality of The Sexes		Won
2014	Women Film Critics Circle Awards	Best On-Screen Couple	Bill Hader, Kristen Wiig	Won
2014	Dublin Film Critics' Circle	Best Actress	Kristen Wiig	Nominated
2014	Indiana Film Journalists Association	Best Actress	Kristen Wiig	Nominated
2015	Critics' Choice Movie Awards	Best Actress in a Comedy	Kristen Wiig	Nominated
2015	Dorian Awards	Unsung Film of The Year		Nominated
2015	Zurich Film Festival	Best International Feature Film	Craig Johnson	Won
2015	MTV Movie Awards	Best Musical Moment	Bill Hader, Kristen Wiig	Nominated
