= Atonement (2026 film) =

2026 American drama film

- Directed by: Reed Van Dyk
- Written by: Reed Van Dyk
- Produced by: Reed Van Dyk; Tim White; Trevor White; Steven Demmler; David Wulf
- Starring: Boyd Holbrook; Kenneth Branagh; Gheed; Hiam Abbass
- Cinematography: Jon Peter
- Edited by: Chelsi Johnston
- Music by: Zak Engel
- Production companies: Star Thrower Entertainment; Talon Entertainment
- Distributed by: Kino Lorber
- Release dates: May 15, 2026 (Cannes); October 2, 2026 (United States)
- Running time: 118 minutes
- Country: United States
- Languages: English; Arabic
- Box office: $47,191

Atonement is a 2026 American war drama film written, produced and directed by Reed Van Dyk in his directorial debut, inspired by the 2012 New Yorker article "Atonement" by Dexter Filkins. It stars Boyd Holbrook, Kenneth Branagh, Gheed and Hiam Abbass.

The film had its world premiere at the Directors' Fortnight section of 2026 Cannes Film Festival on May 15, where it was nominated for the Caméra d'Or. The film was released on October 2, 2026, by Kino Lorber.

== Premise ==
A troubled U.S. Marine seeks to reconcile with the survivors of a family his unit fired on in Iraq in 2003.

== Cast ==
- Boyd Holbrook as Lou D'Alessandro
- Hiam Abbass as Mariam Khachaturian
- Kenneth Branagh as Michael Reid
- Gheed as Nora
- Yara Bakri as Anna
- Kalama Epstein as Pat

== Production ==
In May 2025, it was announced that Boyd Holbrook, Hiam Abbass, and Kenneth Branagh had joined the cast of the film, with Reed Van Dyk directing from a screenplay he wrote, based upon a New Yorker article by Dexter Filkins.

Principal photography began in Dallas, Texas. Filming also took place in Amman, Jordan. Cinematographer Jon Peter shot the film on 16 mm film.

== Release ==
Atonement had its world premiere at the 2026 Cannes Film Festival in the Directors' Fortnight section on May 15. In July 2026, Kino Lorber acquired distribution rights to the film. It also screened at the 2026 Toronto International Film Festival on September 15. It was released on October 2, 2026.

== Reception ==
On the review aggregator website Rotten Tomatoes, the film holds an approval rating of 90%, based on 29 reviews, with an average rating of 7.8/10. Metacritic, which uses a weighted average, assigned the film a score of 76 out of 100, based on 16 critics, indicating "generally favorable" reviews.
