= DeKalb Elementary =

- Poster
- Directed by: Reed Van Dyk
- Written by: Reed Van Dyk
- Produced by: Cory Desrosiers; Enrique Rico Diaz; Christopher Leavins; Morgan Peterson; Ricardo Ramirez; Reed Van Dyk
- Starring: Tarra Riggs; Bo Mitchell
- Cinematography: Jon Peter
- Edited by: Reed Van Dyk
- Production company: Off Road Pictures
- Release dates: February 4, 2017 (Clermont-Ferrand International Film Festival); March 11, 2017 (SXSW)
- Running time: 21 minutes
- Country: United States
- Language: English

DeKalb Elementary is a 2017 American live-action short film directed by Reed Van Dyk and starring Tarra Riggs and Bo Mitchell. It was nominated for an Academy Award for Best Live Action Short Film at the 90th Academy Awards in 2018.

== Premise ==
Based on an actual 911 phone call, a gunman enters an Atlanta, Georgia elementary school and encounters a compassionate employee.

== Cast ==
- Shinelle Azoroh as Lakisha
- John Brockus as Detective Brooks
- Deloris Crenshaw as Miss Thompson
- Brie Eley as Miss Harris
- Jason Fracaro as Officer Gomez
- Sinora Glenn as Nurse Davis
- Del Hunter-White as Dee
- Lou Justice Johnson as Officer Jackson
- Levystein Lockett as Officer Williams
- Bo Mitchell as Steven Hall
- Peyton Perrin as Darius
- Lony'e Perrine as Miss Mitchell
- Champagne Powell as Devon
- Hansford Prince as Principal Flanagan
- Tarra Riggs as Cassandra Rice
- Tobie Windham as Agent Armel Parker

== Reception ==
=== Critical reception ===
On review aggregator website Rotten Tomatoes, the film has an approval rating of 92% based on 12 reviews, and an average rating of 8.33/10.

=== Awards and nominations ===
- Nominated: Academy Award for Best Live Action Short Film
- Nominated: Student Emmy Award for Best Drama
- Nominated: BAFTA Student Film Awards
