= List of accolades received by Loving (2016 film) =

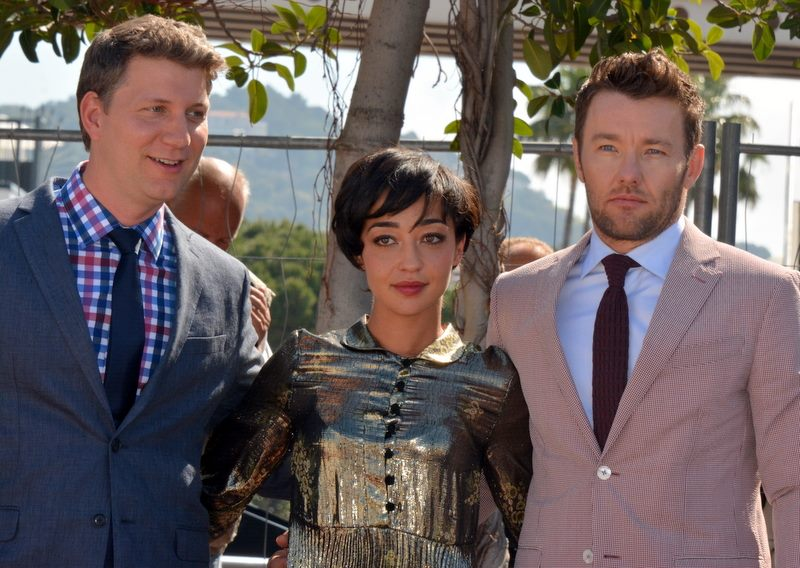
- Nichols, Negga and Edgerton at the 2016 Cannes Film Festival.
Accolades
Award	Won	Nominated
AARP Annual Movies for Grownups Awards	1	2
Academy Awards	0	1
African-American Film Critics Association	2	2
Alliance of Women Film Journalists	2	4
Austin Film Critics Association	0	3
Australian Academy of Cinema and Television Arts Awards	0	2
Black Reel Awards	1	2
Boston Society of Film Critics	1	2
British Academy Film Awards	0	1
Cannes Film Festival	0	1
Casting Society of America	0	1
Chicago Film Critics Association	0	1
Critics' Choice Movie Awards	0	3
Dallas–Fort Worth Film Critics Association	3	3
Detroit Film Critics Society	0	2
Florida Film Critics Circle	1	2
Golden Globe Awards	0	2
Golden Tomato Awards	0	2
Gotham Awards	2	2
Hamptons International Film Festival	1	1
Heartland Film Festival	1	1
Independent Spirit Awards	0	2
IndieWire Critics Poll	5	5
London Film Critics' Circle	0	1
Mill Valley Film Festival	1	1
NAACP Image Awards	0	5
New York Film Critics Online	2	2
Online Film Critics Society	1	1
Palm Springs International Film Festival	1	1
Producers Guild of America Awards	1	1
San Diego Film Critics Society	1	3
San Francisco Film Critics Circle	0	3
Santa Barbara International Film Festival	1	1
Satellite Awards	1	3
St. Louis Film Critics Association	3	7
Texas Film Hall of Fame	1	1
Village Voice Film Poll	5	5
Washington D.C. Area Film Critics Association	0	3
Women Film Critics Circle	3	8
Writers Guild of America Awards	0	1
- Total number of awards and nominations (Note: Certain award groups don't simply award one winner. They recognise several different recipients and have runners-up. Since this is a specific recognition and is different from losing an award, runner-up mentions are considered wins in this award tally.)
Totals	46	87
- References

Loving is a 2016 historical drama film written and directed by Jeff Nichols. The film tells the story of Richard and Mildred Loving, the plaintiffs in the 1967 U.S. Supreme Court decision Loving v. Virginia, which invalidated state laws prohibiting interracial marriage. The film stars Joel Edgerton and Ruth Negga co-starring as the Lovings. Marton Csokas, Nick Kroll, and Michael Shannon are all featured in supporting roles. The film takes inspiration from documentary The Loving Story (2011) by Nancy Buirski

Prior to Loving's successful screenings at the Toronto International Film Festival and Hamptons International Film Festival, the film had premiered at the Cannes Film Festival, on May 16, 2016, in Cannes, France, where it had been selected to compete for the Palme d'Or. Focus Features initially gave the film a limited release in the United States on November 4, 2016, in four locations in New York City and Los Angeles, including ArcLight Hollywood and The Landmark. The film was later given a wide release at 46 theaters in the United States on November 11. Film review aggregator Rotten Tomatoes reports a rating of 89%, based on 178 reviews with an average score of 7.7/10. Metacritic, another review aggregator, assigned the film a weighted average score of 79 (out of 100) based on 45 reviews from mainstream critics.

Loving garnered awards and nominations in a variety of categories with particular praise for its acting (for Joel Edgerton and Ruth Negga), Jeff Nichols' direction, the elegance of Nichols' screenplay, and its faithfulness to the Loving's account.

== Accolades ==
Award	Date of ceremony	Category	Recipient(s)	Result	Ref(s)
AARP Annual Movies for Grownups Awards	February 6, 2017	Best Movies for Grownups	Ged Doherty, Colin Firth, Nancy Buirski, Sarah Green, Marc Turtletaub and Peter Saraf	Won	
AARP Annual Movies for Grownups Awards	February 6, 2017	Best Time Capsule	Loving	Nominated	
Academy Awards	February 26, 2017	Best Actress	Ruth Negga	Nominated	
African-American Film Critics Association	February 8, 2017	Top 10 Films	Loving	7th place	
African-American Film Critics Association	February 8, 2017	Best Actress	Ruth Negga	Won	
Alliance of Women Film Journalists	December 21, 2016	Best Actor	Joel Edgerton	Nominated	
Alliance of Women Film Journalists	December 21, 2016	Best Actress	Ruth Negga	Won	
Alliance of Women Film Journalists	December 21, 2016	Bravest Performance	Ruth Negga	Nominated	
Alliance of Women Film Journalists	December 21, 2016	Best Breakthrough Performance	Ruth Negga	Won	
Austin Film Critics Association	December 28, 2016	Best Austin Film	Loving	Nominated	
Austin Film Critics Association	December 28, 2016	Best Actor	Joel Edgerton	Nominated	
Austin Film Critics Association	December 28, 2016	Best Actress	Ruth Negga	Nominated	
Australian Academy of Cinema and Television Arts Awards	January 8, 2017	Best Actor	Joel Edgerton	Nominated	
Australian Academy of Cinema and Television Arts Awards	January 8, 2017	Best Actress	Ruth Negga	Nominated	
Black Reel Awards	February 16, 2017	Outstanding Film	Ged Doherty, Colin Firth, Nancy Buirski, Sarah Green, Marc Turtletaub and Peter Saraf	Nominated	
Black Reel Awards	February 16, 2017	Outstanding Actress	Ruth Negga	Won	
Boston Society of Film Critics	December 11, 2016	Best Actor	Joel Edgerton	Runner-up	
British Academy Film Awards	February 12, 2017	Rising Star	Ruth Negga	Nominated	
Cannes Film Festival	May 22, 2016	Palme d'Or	Jeff Nichols	Nominated	
Casting Society of America	January 19, 2017	Studio or Independent – Drama	Francine Maisler, Erica Arvold, Anne N. Chapman, and Michelle Kelly	Nominated	
Chicago Film Critics Association Awards	December 15, 2016	Best Actor	Joel Edgerton	Nominated	
Critics' Choice Awards	December 11, 2016	Best Picture	Loving	Nominated	
Critics' Choice Awards	December 11, 2016	Best Original Screenplay	Jeff Nichols	Nominated	
Critics' Choice Awards	December 11, 2016	Best Actor	Joel Edgerton	Nominated	
Critics' Choice Awards	December 11, 2016	Best Actress	Ruth Negga	Nominated	
Dallas–Fort Worth Film Critics Association	December 13, 2016	Best Film	Loving	7th place	
Dallas–Fort Worth Film Critics Association	December 13, 2016	Best Actor	Joel Edgerton	3rd Place	
Dallas–Fort Worth Film Critics Association	December 13, 2016	Best Actress	Ruth Negga	3rd Place	
Detroit Film Critics Society	December 19, 2016	Best Actor	Joel Edgerton	Nominated	
Detroit Film Critics Society	December 19, 2016	Best Actress	Ruth Negga	Nominated	
Florida Film Critics Circle Awards	December 23, 2016	Best Actor	Joel Edgerton	Runner-up	
Florida Film Critics Circle Awards	December 23, 2016	Best Actress	Ruth Negga	Nominated	
Golden Globe Awards	January 8, 2017	Best Actor in a Motion Picture - Drama	Joel Edgerton	Nominated	
Golden Globe Awards	January 8, 2017	Best Actress in a Motion Picture - Drama	Ruth Negga	Nominated	
Gotham Awards	November 28, 2016	Best Actor	Joel Edgerton	Nominated	
Gotham Awards	November 28, 2016	Best Actress	Ruth Negga	Nominated	
Hamptons International Film Festival	October 6, 2016	Victor Rabinowitz & Joanne Grant Award for Social Justice	Loving	Won	
Heartland Film Festival	October 30, 2016	Truly Moving Picture Award	Loving	Won	
Independent Spirit Awards	February 25, 2017	Best Director	Jeff Nichols	Nominated	
Independent Spirit Awards	February 25, 2017	Best Female Lead	Ruth Negga	Nominated	
Indiewire Critics Poll	December 9, 2016	Best Film	Loving	28th place	
Indiewire Critics Poll	December 9, 2016	Best Director	Jeff Nichols (tied with Tom Ford for Nocturnal Animals)	20th place	
Indiewire Critics Poll	December 9, 2016	Best Screenplay	Jeff Nichols (tied with Tom Ford for Nocturnal Animals)	29th place	
Indiewire Critics Poll	December 9, 2016	Best Actor	Joel Edgerton	6th place	
Indiewire Critics Poll	December 9, 2016	Best Actress	Ruth Negga	8th place	
London Film Critics Circle Awards	January 22, 2017	British/Irish Actress of the Year	Ruth Negga (also for Iona)	Nominated	
Make-Up Artists and Hair Stylists Guild	February 19, 2017	Best Period and/or Character Makeup	Julia Lallas, Katie Middleton	Nominated	
Make-Up Artists and Hair Stylists Guild	February 19, 2017	Best Period and/or Character Hair Styling	Kenneth Walker, Elizabeth Paschall	Nominated	
Mill Valley Film Festival	October 16, 2016	U.S. Cinema: Audience Favorite	Jeff Nichols	2nd Place	
MTV Movie & TV Awards	May 7, 2017	Best Fight Against the System	Loving	Nominated	
NAACP Image Awards	February 11, 2017	Outstanding Motion Picture	Loving	Nominated	
NAACP Image Awards	February 11, 2017	Outstanding Independent Picture	Loving	Nominated	
NAACP Image Awards	February 11, 2017	Outstanding Writing in a Motion Picture	Jeff Nichols	Nominated	
NAACP Image Awards	February 11, 2017	Outstanding Actress in a Motion Picture	Ruth Negga	Nominated	
NAACP Image Awards	February 11, 2017	Outstanding Supporting Actor in a Motion Picture	Alano Miller	Nominated	
New York Film Critics Online	December 11, 2016	Top 12 Films	Loving	Won	
New York Film Critics Online	December 11, 2016	Best Breakthrough Performer	Ruth Negga	Won	
Online Film Critics Society	January 3, 2017	Best Actress	Ruth Negga	Nominated	
Palm Springs International Film Festival	January 2, 2017	Rising Star Award	Ruth Negga	Won	
Producers Guild of America	January 28, 2017	Stanley Kramer Award	Ged Doherty, Colin Firth, Sarah Green, Nancy Buirski, Marc Turtletaub, and Peter Saraf	Won	
San Diego Film Critics Society	December 12, 2016	Best Actor	Joel Edgerton	Nominated	
San Diego Film Critics Society	December 12, 2016	Best Actress	Ruth Negga	Nominated	
San Diego Film Critics Society	December 12, 2016	Body of Work	Michael Shannon (also for Nocturnal Animals, Midnight Special and Elvis & Nixon)	Won	
San Francisco Film Critics Circle	December 11, 2016	Best Director	Jeff Nichols	Nominated	
San Francisco Film Critics Circle	December 11, 2016	Best Actor	Joel Edgerton	Nominated	
San Francisco Film Critics Circle	December 11, 2016	Best Actress	Ruth Negga	Nominated	
Santa Barbara International Film Festival	February 3, 2017	Virtuosos Award	Ruth Negga	Won	
Satellite Awards	February 19, 2017	Best Film	Loving	Nominated	
Satellite Awards	February 19, 2017	Best Actor	Joel Edgerton	Nominated	
Satellite Awards	February 19, 2017	Best Actress	Ruth Negga (tied with Isabelle Huppert for Elle)	Won (Tied)	
St. Louis Film Critics Association	December 18, 2016	Best Original Screenplay	Jeff Nichols	Nominated	
St. Louis Film Critics Association	December 18, 2016	Best Actor	Joel Edgerton	Nominated	
St. Louis Film Critics Association	December 18, 2016	Best Actress	Ruth Negga	Nominated	
Texas Film Hall of Fame	March 9, 2017	Hall of Fame	Jeff Nichols (also for Shotgun Stories, Take Shelter, Mud and Midnight Special)	Won	
Village Voice Film Poll	December 21, 2016	Best Film	Loving	31st place	
Village Voice Film Poll	December 21, 2016	Best Director	Jeff Nichols	16th place	
Village Voice Film Poll	December 21, 2016	Best Actor	Joel Edgerton	6th place	
Village Voice Film Poll	December 21, 2016	Best Actress	Ruth Negga	6th place	
Village Voice Film Poll	December 21, 2016	Best Supporting Actor	Michael Shannon	31st place (Tied)	
Washington D.C. Area Film Critics Association	December 5, 2016	Best Actor	Joel Edgerton	Nominated	
Washington D.C. Area Film Critics Association	December 5, 2016	Best Actress	Ruth Negga	Nominated	
Washington D.C. Area Film Critics Association	December 5, 2016	Best Portrayal of Washington D.C.	Loving	Nominated	
Women Film Critics Circle	December 19, 2016	Best Actress	Ruth Negga	Nominated	
Women Film Critics Circle	December 19, 2016	Best Actor	Joel Edgerton	Nominated	
Women Film Critics Circle	December 19, 2016	Best Female Images in a Movie	Loving	Nominated	
Women Film Critics Circle	December 19, 2016	Best Male Images in a Movie	Loving	Won	
Women Film Critics Circle	December 19, 2016	Josephine Baker Award	Loving	Nominated	
Women Film Critics Circle	December 19, 2016	Karen Morley Award	Loving	Nominated	
Women Film Critics Circle	December 19, 2016	Best Screen Couple	Loving	Won	
Women Film Critics Circle	December 19, 2016	Best Equality of the Sexes	Loving	Won	
Writers Guild of America Awards	February 19, 2017	Best Original Screenplay	Jeff Nichols	Nominated	

== See also ==
- 2016 in film
