= Ingrid Goes West =

2017 film by Matt Spicer

- Theatrical release poster
- Directed by: Matt Spicer
- Written by: David Branson Smith; Matt Spicer
- Produced by: Jared Ian Goldman; Aubrey Plaza; Tim White; Trevor White; Adam Mirels; Robert Mirels
- Starring: Aubrey Plaza; Elizabeth Olsen; Billy Magnussen; Wyatt Russell; Pom Klementieff; O'Shea Jackson Jr.
- Cinematography: Bryce Fortner
- Edited by: Jack Price
- Music by: Nick Thorburn; Jonathan Sadoff
- Production companies: Star Thrower Entertainment; 141 Entertainment; Mighty Engine
- Distributed by: Neon
- Release dates: January 20, 2017 (Sundance); August 11, 2017 (United States)
- Running time: 97 minutes
- Country: United States
- Language: English
- Box office: $3.3 million

Ingrid Goes West is a 2017 American black comedy drama film directed by Matt Spicer and written by Spicer and David Branson Smith. The film stars Aubrey Plaza, Elizabeth Olsen, Billy Magnussen, Wyatt Russell, Pom Klementieff, and O'Shea Jackson Jr., and follows a young woman who moves to Los Angeles in an effort to befriend her Instagram idol.

Spicer and Smith developed the idea for the screenplay based on their experiences with the social media platform Instagram, particularly the role of influencers and how social media can breed feelings of social comparison and loneliness. Filming took place in the Los Angeles area from July to August 2016. The film premiered in competition at the 2017 Sundance Film Festival, where it won the Waldo Salt Screenwriting Award. It had a limited release in the United States on August 11, 2017, by Neon, grossing $3 million. The film received positive reviews, with many praising the script, dark themes, humor, and performances.

== Plot ==
Ingrid Thorburn, a lonely and mentally unstable young woman in Pennsylvania, returns home after a stay in a recovery facility. Ingrid had been seeking treatment at the facility after an incident in which she stalked an Instagram influencer and pepper-sprayed her at her wedding. While perusing social media, Ingrid learns of another influencer, the Los Angeles-based Taylor Sloane. Using money she has inherited after her mother's death, Ingrid travels to LA. She rents a house in Venice from Dan Pinto, an aspiring screenwriter, and gets a makeover to emulate Taylor's style.

Ingrid familiarizes herself with the shops and cafés Taylor frequents, which leads to a sighting of Taylor at her favorite bookstore. Ingrid follows Taylor home and kidnaps her dog, Rothko. She later brings Rothko to Taylor, claiming she found the lost dog. Taylor expresses her gratitude by inviting Ingrid to have dinner with her and her artist husband Ezra. The next day, Ingrid asks to borrow Dan's truck so she can help Taylor move some belongings to her vacation home in Joshua Tree. Dan agrees on the condition that Ingrid return that evening to take part in a table read of his screenplay. Taylor and Ingrid spend the night partying, and on the way home, Ingrid damages the truck while driving under the influence. Dan is furious at the damage and that he had to cancel last night's table read.

Ingrid and Taylor begin regularly spending time together. One day at the Sloanes' house, Ingrid meets Taylor's brother, Nicky, a drug addict who is suspicious of Ingrid and her motives. Taylor dismisses previous plans with Ingrid to attend a party with Nicky, furthering Ingrid's dislike for him. Taylor and Nicky invite Ingrid to a party that weekend at fashion blogger Harley Chung's house, telling her to bring Dan, whom Ingrid has insinuated is her boyfriend.

Ingrid seeks ways to reconcile with Dan and takes him out to dinner. After bonding over their past losses one night, the two have sex and begin a relationship. Ingrid takes Dan to Harley's party, where she becomes envious of Taylor and Harley's friendship. After a conversation with Ezra, Ingrid begins to realize that several aspects of Taylor's persona are fabricated. Nicky spies Ingrid using Taylor's birthday as her phone password and steals the phone, where he finds incriminating photos that reveal her obsession with Taylor. Nicky uses this knowledge to blackmail Ingrid for money.

In retaliation, Ingrid manipulates Dan into kidnapping and terrorizing Nicky to keep him quiet. Nicky escapes his bindings and attacks Dan, leading Ingrid to stun Nicky with a crowbar. Ingrid rushes Dan to the hospital and leaves Nicky in the desert. Later, Ingrid sees on Instagram that Taylor and Ezra went to Joshua Tree. She drives there to surprise them, but no one is home. When Ingrid tries to call Taylor, Ezra answers instead and says Nicky has told him and Taylor about everything. He warns Ingrid to stay away from Taylor.

In another attempt to reach Taylor, Ingrid spends all her money buying the small house next door to her Joshua Tree place. The electricity at Ingrid's house is disconnected for nonpayment, which leads her to walk over to Taylor's home, where a Halloween party is being thrown, to charge her phone. When discovered by Taylor, Ingrid tries to convince Taylor to forgive her since friends forgive each other. Taylor responds that she and Ingrid were never truly friends, then tells her to seek professional help before banishing her from the party. Before leaving, Ingrid throws all her truths in her face and that she is as much of a liar as she is, pointing out that her brother is a drug addict, her husband is an alcoholic who hates her, and she pretends to be a popular girl when in reality her life is garbage.

Ingrid returns to her home, dejected and desperate. She records a video for her public Instagram page in which she confesses her past deception and expresses hopelessness about whether she can change. She ends the video by attempting suicide with an overdose of pills.

Ingrid wakes in a hospital, having survived her suicide attempt because Dan saw the video in time. Dan informs Ingrid that her video has gone viral, and thousands of strangers have used the hashtag #iamingrid to show support. While scrolling through all the love for her on social media, Ingrid smiles.

== Cast ==
- Aubrey Plaza as Ingrid Thorburn, a mentally unstable woman with attachment issues, obsessed with social media.
- Elizabeth Olsen as Taylor Sloane, a popular social media influencer with whom Ingrid becomes obsessed.
- Billy Magnussen as Nicky Sloane, a drug addict and Taylor's brother.
- Wyatt Russell as Ezra O'Keefe, a painter and Taylor's husband.
- Pom Klementieff as Harley Chung, a fashion blogger.
- O'Shea Jackson Jr. as Daniel "Dan" Pinto, an aspiring screenwriter and Ingrid's landlord.
- Meredith Hagner as Charlotte Buckwald

== Production ==
=== Development ===
Matt Spicer and David Branson Smith said the script was inspired by "our mutual obsession with Instagram and how it brings out the worst in us, making us feel bad about ourselves, while also being wildly entertaining and addictive." Some of the films Spicer and Smith drew inspiration from included The Talented Mr. Ripley, Taxi Driver, and Single White Female. Smith and Spicer considered writing the film from the perspective of an influencer being stalked, but ultimately decided to write it from the stalker's point of view. Spicer said, "Ingrid represents all of our worst instincts when it comes to social media. Taylor, on the other hand, doesn't want to see through it — she's happy to have this sidekick who looks up to her and tells her how cool and smart she is. You start the movie thinking they're polar opposites but at the end you hopefully come to realize that they're the same."

=== Filming ===
Aubrey Plaza signed on to star in and produce the film. Plaza helped in the casting of O’Shea Jackson Jr. as Dan.

Principal photography, which took place over five weeks, began in July 2016 in Los Angeles and wrapped that August in Joshua Tree, California.

A focal point of the film is a scene set to the song "All My Life" by K-Ci & JoJo. Initially this song was meant to be Seal's "Kiss from a Rose" (which would have tied into the Dan character's obsession with Batman, as it is from the Batman Forever soundtrack), but Seal's asking price for the song was higher than the production could afford. Spicer's sister recommended "All My Life" as a replacement.

== Release ==
Ingrid Goes West had its world premiere at the Sundance Film Festival on January 20, 2017. Shortly after, Neon acquired the North American distribution rights to the film, its first acquisition of a film screened at the festival, for around $3 million, prevailing over studios including A24 and Netflix. It was theatrically released on August 11, 2017.

== Reception ==
=== Box office ===
Following several weeks in limited release, the film went wide on August 25, 2017, and grossed $3,019,057 from 647 theaters, an average of $1,208 per venue.

=== Critical response ===
Ingrid Goes West garnered positive reviews from film critics. On the review aggregator website Rotten Tomatoes, 84% of 197 critics' reviews are positive, with an average rating of 7.1/10. The website's consensus reads: "Led by strong performances from Aubrey Plaza and Elizabeth Olsen, Ingrid Goes West delivers smart, topical humor underlined by timely social observations." Metacritic, which uses a weighted average, assigned the film a score of 71 out of 100, based on 39 critics, indicating "generally favorable" reviews.

Writing for RogerEbert.com, Sheila O'Malley gave the film 3 and ½ stars out of 4 and said the film is "a biting expose on How We Live Now: sitting on our phones, rote scrolling through someone else's online life, clicking 'Hearts' without even taking a moment to absorb the image. The film lampoons stuff that didn't even exist 10 years ago but has now become such a part of our everyday lives that no one takes a second to consider the potential negative effects. If everything is public, then where is the Self? Is turning yourself into a ‘brand' really a good idea? If you don't take a picture of it and - crucially - share it with the world, did it really happen?" O'Malley also commended Plaza's performance, writing her "real gift is in making Ingrid both hilarious and tragic. She doesn't pull her punches. It's part performance, part social commentary."

The New York Times' Ben Kenigsberg said that while the film's commentary on a social media-obsessed culture could have been sharper, "Ms. Plaza is a whiz with timing and does a deft job of shifting viewers’ sympathy; her character can be loathsome or pathetic depending on the scene. O’Shea Jackson Jr., as her Batman-obsessed landlord, is every bit as funny and nearly walks away with the movie."

Criticisms lamented that the film did not go deep enough into exploring Ingrid’s mental health or the roots of her mental illness. Matthew Eng of Little White Lies wrote, "Through Plaza, Spicer’s film achieves the highwire humour it seeks, but its thematic heft is light and its dual depictions of addiction and mental illness are rooted in a reactionary finger-wagging that leaves its antiheroine more diagnosed than explored. Ingrid Goes West is a film that knows that people like Ingrid tell themselves stories in order to live but doesn’t entirely understand why, betraying a gap in knowledge and lived experience that makes for a satire not only lacking teeth but imagination."

=== Accolades ===
Award	Date of ceremony	Category	Recipient(s) and nominee(s)	Result	Ref.
Sundance Film Festival	January 28, 2017	Waldo Salt Screenwriting Award	David Branson Smith and Matt Spicer	Won	
Deauville American Film Festival	September 8, 2017	Grand Prix	Matt Spicer	Nominated	
Florida Film Critics Circle Awards	December 23, 2017	Best First Film	Ingrid Goes West	Nominated	
Austin Film Critics Association	January 8, 2018	Best First Film	Ingrid Goes West	Nominated	
Guild of Music Supervisors Awards	February 8, 2018	Best Music Supervision for Film: Budgeted Under 5 Million Dollars	Maggie Phillips	Nominated	
Online Film & Television Association	February 18, 2018	Best Feature Debut	Matt Spicer	Nominated	
Independent Spirit Awards	March 3, 2018	Best First Feature	Ingrid Goes West	Won	
Independent Spirit Awards	March 3, 2018	Best First Screenplay	David Branson Smith and Matt Spicer	Nominated	
Chlotrudis Awards	March 18, 2018	Best Actress	Aubrey Plaza	Nominated	
