= Welcome Home (2018 film) =

Film by George Ratliff

- Directed by: George Ratliff
- Written by: David Levinson
- Produced by: Allan Mandelbaum; Tim White; Trevor White
- Starring: Aaron Paul; Emily Ratajkowski; Riccardo Scamarcio
- Cinematography: Shelly Johnson
- Edited by: Brian Scofield
- Music by: Bear McCreary
- Production companies: Voltage Pictures; Star Thrower Entertainment
- Distributed by: Vertical Entertainment
- Release date: November 16, 2018
- Running time: 93 minutes
- Country: United States
- Language: English
- Box office: $331,704

Welcome Home is a 2018 thriller film directed by George Ratliff, starring Aaron Paul and Emily Ratajkowski as a couple attempting to solve their personal problems with a romantic trip to Italy. Riccardo Scamarcio appears in a supporting role as Federico.

Casting of Paul and Ratajkowski was announced in April 2017. The film was written by David Levinson, produced by Allan Mandelbaum, Tim White and Trevor White and directed by George Ratliff for Voltage Pictures. On September 7, 2018, the film was set for a video on demand release on November 12, 2018. The first trailer for the film was released on October 4, 2018.

== Plot ==
Bryan and Cassie are a couple who decide to stay in a house in Umbria. They are trying to mend their relationship, after Cassie was caught having drunken sex with a co-worker. Since then, Bryan has become impotent. Cassie goes out for a run, and falls down and injures her ankle. She flags down a passing truck, and a handsome man named Federico stops and helps her. He gives her a ride back, and then offers to give them a ride to town the next day. They agree, and spend an awkward ride there the next day. Bryan accuses Cassie of not being able to see how Federico looks at her with lust; disgusted, Cassie leaves to go back to the house. Bryan gets drunk at a bar, Federico joins him. Federico invites two ladies to help Bryan back to a hotel. Bryan and the two ladies end up having sex. Bryan, due to Federico surreptitiously drugging his drink at the bar, has no memory of this and takes a taxi home.

It is shown that Federico has secret cameras all over their house, and is secretly watching them. Federico starts showing up when Bryan is not around, and Bryan discovers that Federico is not their neighbor, despite his claims. When he threatens to tell Cassie this, Federico threatens him back by telling him that he will tell Cassie that he slept with the two ladies while drunk. Bryan denies this, and eventually tells Cassie that Federico is not who he says he is and to not let him visit. Cassie thinks that Federico is nothing but nice, until Federico cooks them rabbit stew and creepily tells them how much he likes to hunt.

Federico sees through his cameras Bryan and Cassie making up and planning to have sex; disgusted, he traps Bryan in the cellar and leaves a note for Cassie to put on a blindfold. Cassie, thinking the note was from Bryan, does so. Federico kisses and gropes her while taping himself doing so, and then, hearing Bryan escaping, sets a video to play it. At the same time, he leaves Bryan's phone near Cassie so she can pick it up. Cassie sees a video of Bryan and the two ladies having sex in the hotel. Upset, she gets dressed and goes to Bryan, and they have a fight, each accusing the other of infidelity.

Cassie throws her phone at Bryan, it misses him and hits a mirror, revealing a hidden camera. They realize that Federico is watching them secretly and panic. Federico, watching, sees that they have realised and comes over. They plead to be let go, but Federico attacks Bryan with a knife. They wrestle, and Cassie grabs a cane and hits Federico. Stunned, he falls and she keeps hitting him until he dies. Bryan stops her and says that she will go down for murder but he'll help her. A car pulls up and Bryan tells her to wipe up the blood and he'll hide the body.

The visitor turns out to be Eduardo, the owner of the house that Bryan called earlier to complain about Federico. Bryan tells him that everything was all right now, and Eduardo asks to check the house. Eduardo goes to check and Bryan and Cassie panic, wondering what to do.

Meanwhile, Eduardo goes to check the computers where the cameras were feeding from, revealing himself to be an accomplice of Federico's. He rewinds the tapes and sees Cassie killing Federico, and goes and asks her to confess. She denies it while Bryan sneaks up. Suddenly, Eduardo turns and aims a gun at Bryan, accusing them of murder. They deny it, and Cassie stabs Eduardo. He falls and Bryan takes the gun and shoots Eduardo.

Bryan finds the computer room and sees the two have been recording lots of couples. Bryan burns the tapes outside, and he and Cassie bury the bodies. They destroy the cameras, but don't realise they are also being filmed by an outside camera, hidden in the eye of a gnome. They promise each other never to tell a soul of what happened and finally have sex. The film ends with people around the world seeing the couple burying the bodies and being horrified. One couple switches to another streaming hidden camera revealing an online and worldwide culture of rental properties wired similarly to Federico's home.

== Cast ==
- Aaron Paul as Bryan Palmer
- Emily Ratajkowski as Cassie Ryerson
- Riccardo Scamarcio as Federico
- Katy Louise Saunders as Alessandra
- Alice Bellagamba as Isabella
- Francesco Acquaroli as Eduardo

== Response ==
=== Box office ===
Welcome Home was not released in North American theaters. It grossed $331,704 in foreign release, plus $13,914 in home video sales.

=== Critical reception ===
On review aggregator website Rotten Tomatoes, the film has an approval rating of 10%, based on 10 reviews, with an average rating of 3.3/10. Metacritic reports a normalized score of 38 out of 100, based on 4 critics, indicating "generally unfavorable reviews".
