= Tutankhamun: Enter the Tomb =

2019 virtual reality short film

- Directed by: Joel Newton
- Written by: Bart Gavigan & Gabriel Gavigan
- Produced by: Joel Newton
- Starring: Hugh Bonneville
- Release date: 1 November 2019
- Countries: United States; United Kingdom
- Language: English

Tutankhamun: Enter the Tomb is a virtual reality short written by Bart Gavigan & Gabriel Gavigan and directed/produced by Joel Newton that recreates the legendary tomb of King Tutankhamun whilst walking the viewer through the meaning behind what was discovered there. It made its debut in 2019 at the London and was met with critical acclaim, going on to win a Lumiere Award for Best Educational Virtual Reality Experience. Hugh Bonneville stars as the narrator.
