= 8-Bit Christmas =

2021 American Christmas comedy film

- Promotional release poster
- Directed by: Michael Dowse
- Written by: Kevin Jakubowski
- Based on: 8-Bit Christmas by Kevin Jakubowski
- Produced by: Tim White; Trevor White; Allan Mandelbaum; Nick Nantell; Jonathan Sadowski
- Starring: Neil Patrick Harris; Winslow Fegley; June Diane Raphael; David Cross; Steve Zahn
- Cinematography: Samy Inayeh
- Edited by: Trevor Ambrose
- Music by: Joseph Trapanese
- Production companies: Warner Bros. Pictures; New Line Cinema; Star Thrower Entertainment
- Distributed by: HBO Max
- Release date: November 24, 2021
- Running time: 97 minutes
- Country: United States
- Language: English

8-Bit Christmas is a 2021 American Christmas comedy film directed by Michael Dowse, from a screenplay by Kevin Jakubowski based upon his novel of the same name. It stars Neil Patrick Harris, Winslow Fegley, June Diane Raphael, David Cross, and Steve Zahn. The film was released on November 24, 2021, on HBO Max, receiving generally favorable reviews from critics.

== Plot ==
In December 2021, Jake Doyle recounts his Christmas of 1988 when all he wanted was a Nintendo Entertainment System, to his daughter, Annie, who wants a cell phone for Christmas, which Jake refuses to purchase for her.

Timothy Keane, the richest kid in Jake's grade, is the only kid in town with a Nintendo and all the latest accessories. Every day, Jake and his friends gather with the rest of the school outside of Timmy's house, where he chooses ten kids to play with him in his basement. Tired of pandering to Timmy for access to the coveted Nintendo, Jake dreams of getting his own for Christmas. He requests it from his distracted schoolteacher mom, Kathy, and his DIY-obsessed dad, John, only to be denied on the basis that video games are bad for his brain and that he should play outside more. Jake's desire for a Nintendo intensifies after Timmy destroys his TV and seriously injures his family's dog out of anger after losing a game to the failing Nintendo accessory, the Power Glove.

Hearing that the first prize of a Scout fundraiser for selling Christmas wreaths will be a Nintendo, Jake and his friends compete to win the system. Jake's sister Lizzy has her own desired gift, a Cabbage Patch Kids doll, and in exchange for tips on selling wreaths, Jake agrees to drop hints on her behalf. After finding that all Cabbage Patch Kids are sold out, Jake accompanies John to a back alley deal to buy a doll. Jake wins the fundraiser, only to discover that the prize was swapped out to an encyclopedia set after Timmy's father convinced the community to ban video games due to the Nintendo causing their dog to be injured.

Jake and his friends decide to take matters into their own hands, selling baseball cards (including a rare Bill Ripken card) to pool their money and buy a system to share. They concoct an elaborate plan to sneak away from a school field trip to make their purchase. Evan Olsen creates a distraction while Jake sneaks off of the bus and rushes into the mall, evading his friends' parents who are protesting video games in front of the game store. He successfully purchases the Nintendo, but while returning to the bus he slips on a patch of ice, dropping the Nintendo into the street where it is crushed by the school bus. The Cabbage Patch dealer from earlier helps Jake return to his field trip and advises him to focus less on presents and more on the spirit of giving.

Christmas Day comes, and Jake does not receive a Nintendo. He is hopeful upon receiving a package from his crazy rich Uncle Dan in Japan, but is dismayed to find it is a Japanese Lite-Brite rather than the Nintendo, causing him to lose all faith in Christmas. John later surprises Jake with a backyard tree fort he made himself. Although Jake never got a Nintendo for Christmas, in retrospect he determined that the tree fort and his father's love for him was a better gift.

In the present, Jake tells his daughter he eventually bought his own Nintendo after working all summer to earn one. He then shows her the tree fort, still standing, and reminisces about all the good memories and adventures he gained from his father's gift. The two join the rest of Jake's family for dinner, saving an empty seat for John, who is implied to have passed away.

== Cast ==
- Winslow Fegley as Young Jake Doyle
  - Neil Patrick Harris as Adult Jake Doyle
- Sophia Reid-Gantzert as Annie Doyle, Jake's daughter
- June Diane Raphael as Kathy Doyle, Jake's mother
- Steve Zahn as John Doyle, Jake's father
- Bellaluna Resnick as Lizzy Doyle, Jake's sister
- Che Tafari as Mikey Trotter, one of young Jake's friends
- Santino Barnard as Evan Olsen, one of young Jake's friends who is allergic to bees and SpaghettiOs
- Max Malas as Jeff Farmer, a kid in Jake's circle but not one of his friends and a pathological liar
- Brielle Rankins as Tammy Hodges, one of young Jake's friends who collects baseball cards, she is also Teddy's twin sister
- Cyrus Arnold as Josh Jagorski, an oversized school bully
- Braelyn Rankins as Teddy Hodges, one of young Jake's friends and Tammy's twin brother
- Chandler Dean as Timmy Keane, a narcissistic rich kid who owns a Nintendo (NES) system and likes showing-off
- Katia Smith as Tiffany Keane, Timmy's sister
- Jacob Laval as Connor Stump
- Tom Rooney as Dr. Timothy Keane Sr., Timmy's father who is an anti-video game advocate
- David Cross as Dealer
- Christy Bruce as Katie Doyle, Jake's wife and Annie's mother
- Luca Doulgeris as Charlie Doyle, Jake's son

== Production ==
In March 2021, it was announced Neil Patrick Harris, Winslow Fegley, June Diane Raphael, and Steve Zahn had joined the cast of the film, with Michael Dowse directing from a screenplay by its author and executive producer Kevin Jakubowski, which appeared on the 2019 Black List. New Line Cinema and Star Thrower Entertainment produced the film, with HBO Max distributing.

Principal photography began in March 2021, in Toronto, Canada.

== Timeline ==
The narration states the story takes place in "the late 80s", and the setting can be more precisely placed in 1989 based upon the availability of the Nintendo Power Glove (released in the United States in October 1989) and the infamous profanity printed on the Bill Ripken baseball card (released in Fleer's 1989 set).

There are some potential inconsistencies with this timeline, however. The Nintendo Entertainment System was widely released in the United States in 1986, allowing three years for it to become widespread; after this amount of time, it is highly unlikely that the rich kid in Jake's class would still be the only child to own one. Additionally, the popularity of Cabbage Patch Kids peaked in 1983–1986, and by 1989 would not have been as scarce as depicted in the film. Also, Fleer's 1989 baseball cards were released early in the year, and by December new packs would only contain cards that were censored to hide the profanity. These inconsistencies can be justified by considering that adult Jake's memory of the experience may not be perfect, with more than 30 years having elapsed since the story took place and it being based his childhood memories. It is also possible that he intentionally embellished the story (such as combining storylines that took place across a range of Christmases) for the sake of his daughter.

== Release ==
The film was digitally released on November 24, 2021, on HBO Max. It was released on DVD on October 18, 2022.

== Reception ==
On review aggregator website Rotten Tomatoes, the film holds an approval rating of 84% based on 31 reviews, with an average rating of 7/10. The website's critics consensus reads, "For viewers seeking an undemanding and sweetly nostalgic ode to yuletide seasons past, 8-Bit Christmas boots up without a glitch." Metacritic, which uses a weighted average, assigned a score of 66 out of 100 based on five critics, indicating "generally favorable" reviews.

Nick Ordoña of the Los Angeles Times praised the casting, directing, and Jakubowski's writing, summarizing: "It even earns its heart-tugging ending. In short, it's a surprise contender for Best Christmas Movie of the last several years." Calum Marsh of The New York Times wrote: "When it isn't fawning over roller rinks, Goonies posters, and Casio watches, 8 Bit Christmas is a warm and refreshingly earnest holiday comedy."

== See also ==
- List of Christmas films
