= LBJ (2016 film) =

2016 film by Rob Reiner

- Theatrical release poster
- Directed by: Rob Reiner
- Written by: Joey Hartstone
- Produced by: Matthew George; Tim White; Trevor White; Rob Reiner; Liz Glotzer
- Starring: Woody Harrelson; Michael Stahl-David; Richard Jenkins; Bill Pullman; Jeffrey Donovan; Jennifer Jason Leigh
- Cinematography: Barry Markowitz
- Edited by: Bob Joyce
- Music by: Marc Shaiman
- Production companies: Acacia Entertainment; Savvy Media Holdings; Star Thrower Entertainment; Castle Rock Entertainment; Executive producers: ITS Capital; Parkside Pictures; Tadross Media Group; Voltage Pictures
- Distributed by: Electric Entertainment
- Release dates: September 9, 2016 (TIFF); November 3, 2017 (United States)
- Running time: 98 minutes
- Country: United States
- Language: English
- Budget: $20 million
- Box office: $2.5 million

LBJ is a 2016 American political drama film about the beginning of the administration of U.S. president Lyndon B. Johnson following the assassination of U.S. president John F. Kennedy. It was directed by Rob Reiner and written by Joey Hartstone, whose script was on the 2014 Black List. The film stars Woody Harrelson as Johnson, along with Richard Jenkins, Bill Pullman, Kim Allen, Michael Stahl-David, Jennifer Jason Leigh, Jeffrey Donovan, Doug McKeon, C. Thomas Howell, and Michael Mosley.

Principal photography took place in New Orleans, Baton Rouge, Dallas, and Washington, D.C. from September to December 2015. The film premiered at the Toronto International Film Festival on September 9, 2016. It was theatrically released by Electric Entertainment and Vertical Entertainment on November 3, 2017. The film received mixed reviews from critics, who called it "surface skimming" and criticized Harrelson's makeup, with some comparing the film negatively to the 2016 HBO film about Johnson, All the Way.

== Plot ==
Vice President Lyndon B. Johnson and his wife, Lady Bird Johnson, greet President John F. Kennedy and First Lady Jacqueline Kennedy on November 22, 1963, in Dallas, Texas. While the crowd warmly greets Kennedy, a clearly-disgruntled Johnson is virtually ignored.

Four years earlier, as the Senate Majority Leader, Johnson was bullying senators into supporting legislation. During one such meeting, Johnson needled fellow Texas Senator Ralph Yarborough about supporting Kennedy, whose publicly televised campaign won him a series of popular primaries, over him in the 1960 election. At Johnson's Texas ranch, Robert F. Kennedy unsuccessfully probed Johnson's presidential aspirations. Advised to announce his candidacy publicly, he instead preferred to disclose at the convention, privately admitting Kennedy's instant charm could overwhelm him. At the convention, as Johnson was whipping votes, Bobby confronted him about his broken promise, vengefully analyzing their rising odds.

Bypassing his brother and advisors like Kenneth O'Donnell, Kennedy, who had won the Democratic presidential nomination on the first ballot, selected Johnson as his running mate, wanting to increase the vice presidency's powers. Both successfully defeated Richard Nixon and Henry Lodge Jr. by one of the narrowest margins in history. In his early days, Johnson requested all government agencies "cooperate fully with the vice president in the carrying out of these assignments", but Kennedy's advisors, allied with Bobby (the Attorney General), attempted to block Johnson's influence. Kennedy appointed O'Donnell to chair his new Equal Employment Opportunity Commission, but the commission's first meeting failed as the Cabinet secretaries meant to compose the civil rights legislation sent aides instead. Johnson precariously told his advisors he would compromise on civil rights, particularly with the Southern Democrats, led by his friend and mentor Senator Richard Russell. Although successfully convinced to support equal employment opportunities in exchange for a manufacturing deal in his native Georgia, Russell rejected further compromises from Johnson. Afterwards, Johnson attempted to convince Kennedy to appoint his friend Sarah T. Hughes as a federal judge, a recommendation they barely acknowledged. He eventually deduced that Bobby wanted to preserve his own Presidential ambitions for 1968.

Meanwhile, back in Dallas, Johnson hears a shot as he, Lady Bird, and the Kennedys are driven through the streets in their motorcade. The Secret Service then rush him to a nearby hospital, informing him Kennedy has been fatally wounded. Disregarding their requests for him to return to the White House immediately and unwilling to leave Dallas without Jackie, who refuses to leave her husband, he instead telephones Bobby, who allows him to be sworn in whenever he wants. Against Bobby's wish, Johnson takes the oath aboard Air Force One accompanied by Jackie, with Sarah Hughes swearing him in as president. As he returns to Washington, his intentions are questioned. Russell and his Southern Democratic block, however, eagerly anticipate him abandoning civil rights legislation. Johnson asks Kennedy's former advisors to remain, if prepared. He also confesses to Lady Bird that he would have rather lost the presidency independently rather than inherit it in such circumstances.

Johnson eventually decides to heal the nation and ensure a successful presidency by establishing himself as both Kennedy's successor and heir and embracing civil rights. While Kennedy speechwriter Ted Sorensen composes a speech for a joint session of Congress, initially to eulogize Kennedy and be an inaugural address for Johnson himself, Johnson begins whipping votes for his civil rights bill. Eventually, his 'Let Us Continue' speech charms both chambers of Congress, including Yarborough, Russell, and Bobby.

A closing text recounts that on July 2, 1964, Johnson signed into law the Civil Rights Act of 1964, fulfilling Kennedy's dream. On November 3, he defeated Senator Barry Goldwater in the presidential election, winning 44 states and taking 61.1% of the popular vote, the largest margin of victory since 1820. Over his next term, Johnson pushed through the Great Society legislation, such as the Voting Rights Act of 1965, and established programs such as Medicare, Medicaid, and Head Start. However, his escalation of the Vietnam War led to rising American deaths and intensifying anti-war protests, causing his popularity to plummet by 1968, and causing challenges from within his own party, including Bobby. On March 31, 1968, Johnson declared that he would not seek another presidential term.

== Cast ==
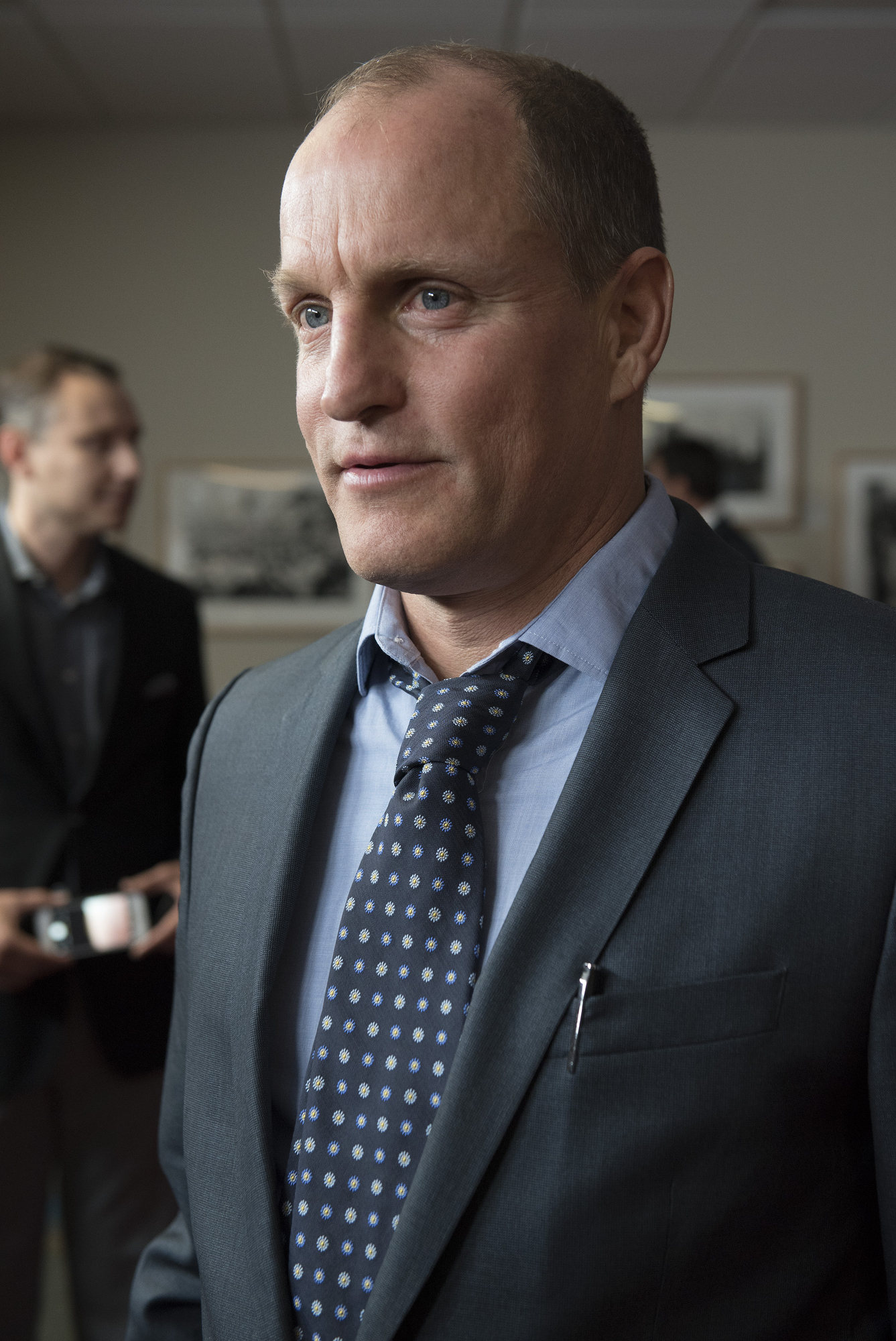
Harrelson talks to the media before a screening of LBJ at the LBJ Presidential Library

- Woody Harrelson as Lyndon B. Johnson
- Jennifer Jason Leigh as Lady Bird Johnson
- Michael Stahl-David as Robert F. Kennedy
- Richard Jenkins as Senator Richard Russell Jr.
- Bill Pullman as Senator Ralph Yarborough
- Jeffrey Donovan as John F. Kennedy
- Kim Allen as Jacqueline Kennedy
- Brent Bailey as Ted Sorensen
- John Burke as John Connally
- John Ellison Conlee as George Reedy
- Oliver Edwin as Bill Moyers
- Darrel Guilbeau as Jack Valenti
- Gary Grubbs as Senator Everett Dirksen
- C. Thomas Howell as Walter Jenkins
- Wallace Langham as Arthur M. Schlesinger Jr.
- Kate Butler as Juanita Roberts
- Doug McKeon as Hubert Humphrey
- Michael Mosley as Kenneth O'Donnell
- Tim Ransom as Larry O'Brien
- Rich Sommer as Pierre Salinger
- Brian Stepanek as Rufus Youngblood

== Production ==
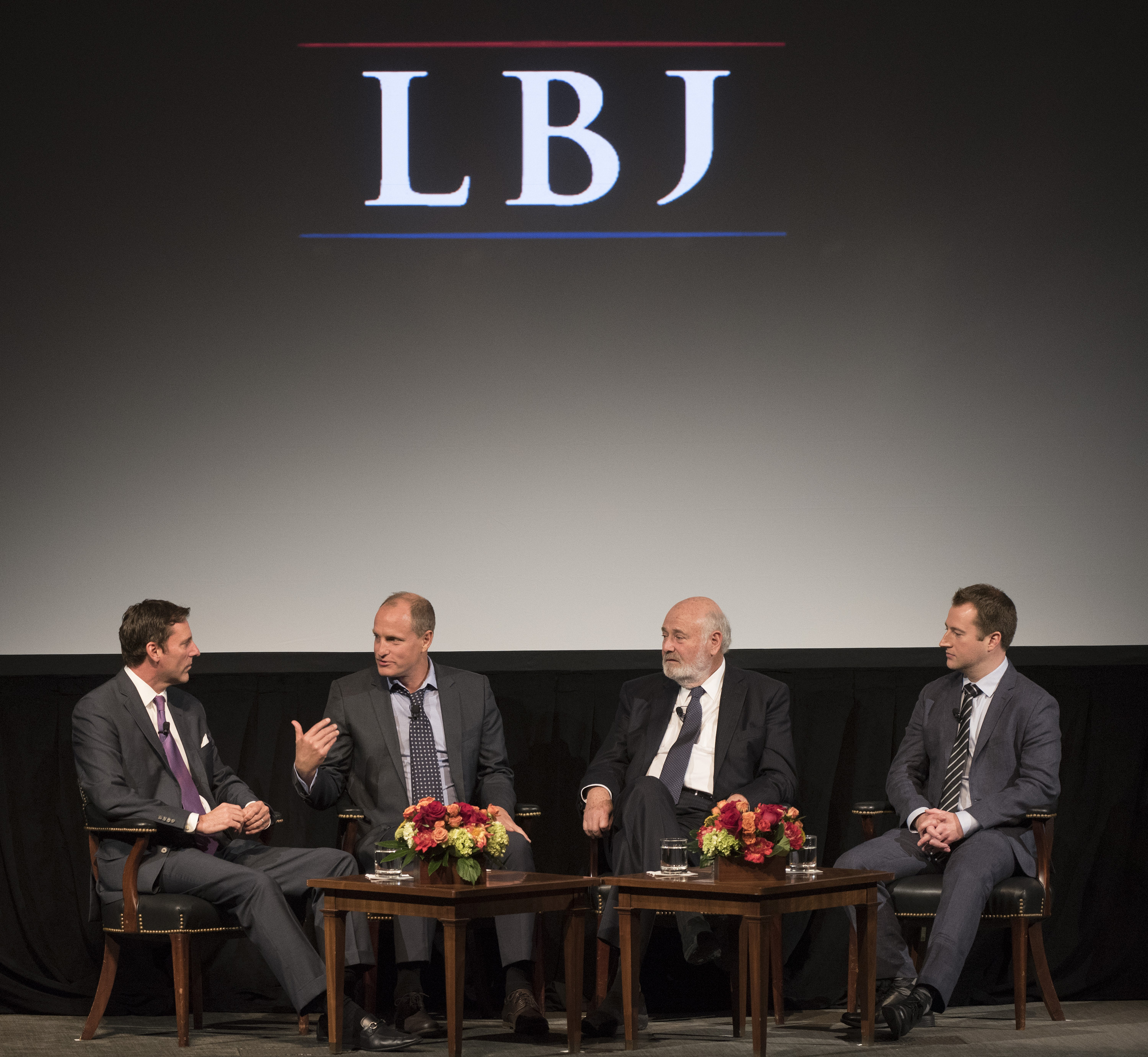
(L–R) Mark Updegrove (LBJ Library Director), Woody Harrelson, Rob Reiner and Joey Hartstone participate in a discussion following a screening of LBJ at the LBJ Presidential Library

The script for LBJ, a political-historical drama written by Joey Hartstone, was one of the winners of the 2014 Black List of unproduced screenplays. On June 16, 2015, Woody Harrelson signed on to play the lead role of 36th President Lyndon B. Johnson, while Rob Reiner signed to direct the film. The film was produced by Acacia Entertainment, Savvy Media Holdings, Castle Rock Entertainment, and Star Thrower Entertainment, and financed by Acacia and Savvy Media. Producers on the film are Matthew George, Reiner, Liz Glotzer, Tim White and Trevor White.

=== Filming ===
Principal photography on the film began in New Orleans on September 21, 2015. It was also shot in Baton Rouge, Dallas, and Washington, D.C. Principal photography wrapped in December 2015.

== Release ==
The film had its world premiere at the Toronto International Film Festival on September 9, 2016. Shortly after, Electric Entertainment and Vertical Entertainment acquired distribution rights to the film. It was theatrically released on November 3, 2017.

== Reception ==
=== Box office ===
LBJ debuted to $1.1 million at 659 theaters, finishing 14th at the box office.

=== Critical response ===
On review aggregator website Rotten Tomatoes, the film has an approval rating of 55%, based on 84 reviews, with an average rating of 5.7/10. The site's critical consensus reads, "LBJ loses sight of its complicated subject, ignoring the more intriguing aspects of his personality and career in favor of a frustratingly ordinary biopic treatment." On Metacritic, the film has a weighted average score 54 out of 100, based 19 critics, indicating "mixed or average" reviews.

David Ehrlich of IndieWire gave the film a C, and said "Harrelson, who has a gift for squeezing charm out of even his most monstrous characters, leans hard into the contradictory notion that Johnson is a power-hungry humanist. The result is a performance that is both wildly ridiculous and appreciably grounded ... Harrelson’s turn seizes on his unique charisma in order to disentangle LBJ from the policies that have defined his legacy."

TVOvermind critic Nat Berman gave the film a positive review, and praised Reiner's cast selection.

=== Accolades ===
Award/Festival	Date of ceremony	Category	Recipient(s) and nominee(s)	Result	Ref.
Saturn Awards	June 27, 2018	Best Independent Film	LBJ	Nominated	

== See also ==
- Lyndon B. Johnson in popular culture
- Cultural depictions of Jacqueline Kennedy Onassis
- Cultural depictions of John F. Kennedy
