= The Good Neighbor (2016 film) =

- Directed by: Kasra Farahani
- Written by: Mark Bianculli; Jeff Richard
- Produced by: Elana Barry; Allan Mandelbaum; Rosalie Sweden; Giri Tharan; Tim White; Trevor White
- Starring: James Caan; Logan Miller; Keir Gilchrist
- Cinematography: Alexander Alexandrov
- Edited by: Kathy Gatto
- Music by: Andrew Hewitt
- Production companies: Anonymous Content; Ball & Chain Productions; Star Thrower Entertainment
- Distributed by: Vertical Entertainment
- Release dates: March 13, 2016 (SXSW); September 16, 2016 (United States)
- Country: United States
- Language: English

The Good Neighbor is a 2016 American thriller film directed by Kasra Farahani and written by Mark Bianculli and Jeff Richard. The film stars James Caan, Logan Miller and Keir Gilchrist. The film was released on September 16, 2016, by Vertical Entertainment.

== Plot ==
Ethan (Miller) and Sean (Gilchrist) are tech-savvy high-school teenagers who decide to prank their neighbor Harold Grainey (Caan) by convincing him that his house is haunted. When Grainey leaves home one morning, the two set up equipment to simulate the haunting, as well as hidden cameras that will broadcast Grainey's reactions.

As the basis for a school project, Ethan requests Sean's assistance in setting up hidden cameras at Grainey's home so both can view a person's unfiltered reaction to being haunted by a poltergeist, despite Sean's initial reservations. The cameras are set up so that both can monitor Grainey's reactions for six weeks live from computers in Ethan's bedroom. Grainey has a reputation for being hostile, a recluse, and a "creepy old man" in the neighborhood, which makes it easier for Ethan to justify choosing him as his subject.

Ethan starts to initiate activities aimed at unsettling Grainey to make him believe the house is haunted, including making the kitchen door bang loudly in the middle of the night, disabling the heating system (which causes the bedroom window to shatter because of the freezing temperature), and activating the stereo in the middle of the night.

Throughout the movie, we are shown flashforwards to a criminal trial and flashbacks of Grainey and his wife. These flashbacks are all linked with the "paranormal" activities that the boys try to use to unsettle Grainey. For example, a flashback shows Grainey's wife dancing to music at 3 a.m. and crying, and one of the activities the boys do is play the same song at a similar time. Another example is how Grainey's wife used to complain about the door not shutting correctly and banging. The first activity the boys did was slam the door continuously, leading to Grainey destroying it with an axe.

Sean and Ethan are mystified by Grainey's ability to withstand all these strange occurrences. In one instance, they observe Grainey being disturbed by all the strange noises and then going down to the house's basement. The duo is not able to observe what he does, as they were not able to set up a camera there as the door was locked. Grainey goes down at about 11:30 p.m. and only emerges after 7:30 a.m. This leaves Ethan perplexed, and he vows to determine the reason. They then try calling the police, claiming they heard a woman screaming in his basement. The police officer arrives and Grainey allows him to look in the basement, and the officer leaves after being satisfied there is nothing of concern.

Ethan begins to push for them to break into Grainey's basement, but Sean refuses. In an argument with Ethan, Sean discloses to Ethan that he knows the true reason why Ethan has targeted Grainey: Grainey was responsible for sending Ethan's father to jail many years ago. Ethan's father was an alcoholic who beat his wife regularly. During one such episode, Ethan's mother ran to Grainey for help. Grainey informed the police, which led to Ethan's father being jailed and ultimately getting divorced from his wife. Ethan believes Grainey is responsible for destroying his family and making him lose his father. In the meantime, Ethan throws a Halloween party, and Sean and his new girlfriend decide to make out in a spare bedroom. His girlfriend notices a camera installed on top of the bed, which leaves Sean enraged.

Sean asks Ethan to return all his equipment, but Ethan refuses, threatening Sean with the fact that the equipment was purchased using his credit card and that it is covered in Sean's fingerprints. In the middle of their argument, they observe Grainey's cat toppling over one of the living room cameras. Ethan runs to Grainey’s home to collect the camera, and in doing so finds the basement door unlocked. He goes down to find that Grainey had made a shrine to his late wife in the basement. Ethan lifts a bell which Grainey gifted his wife, causing the bell to make a sound which wakes up Grainey. Fearing for his safety, Ethan hides in the living room, placing the bell on a table. Grainey sees the bell and kills himself with his gun.

It is then revealed in a series of flashbacks that Grainey loved his wife dearly, and he had set up a room where he could take care of her, including arranging a nurse. The viewer then realises that every activity performed by the boys related to Grainey's wife somehow, and Grainey is convinced that he is being haunted by his wife. A flashback is shown when Grainey first gives her the bell, saying that whenever she needed him, she only had to ring the bell. The bell noise that woke him and the fact that the bell was on the table leads Grainey to believe it was as a sign that his wife wants him to be with her.

Ethan and Sean are arrested and sentenced to two years probation and 500 hours of community service. Leaving the courthouse, Sean and the girls seem to share a glance and head in opposite directions. Ethan is surrounded by a slew of reporters and cameras. Having finally gained the attention he admitted to craving in an earlier scene, a slight smile appears on his face.

== Cast ==
- James Caan as Harold Grainey
- Logan Miller as Ethan Fleming
- Keir Gilchrist as Sean Turner
- Laura Innes as Caroline Grainey
- Edwin Hodge as Officer Christopher Palmer
- Anne Dudek as Elise Fleming
- Bailey Noble as Carly
- Lili Reinhart as Ashley
- Mindy Sterling as Mae
- Nik Dodani as Sanjay
- Tamlyn Tomita as Heather Cromwell
- Dean Cameron as Defense Attorney
- Francesca Ling as Young Woman
- William Charles Mitchell as Judge
- Billy Khoury as Neighbor
- Ted King as Sean's Father
- Luke Spencer Roberts as Ted Spiegelman
- Elyse Dinh as Reporter #1
- Hannah Else Pilkington as Reporter #3

== Release ==
The Austin, Texas premiere, through the South by Southwest Film Festival, was well attended and featured appearances from the director, producers and stars.

On May 10, 2016, Variety announced that Vertical Entertainment had acquired North American theatrical distribution rights, with a release tentatively planned for fall of 2016. The film was scheduled to be released on September 16, 2016.

== Reception ==
On review aggregator website Rotten Tomatoes, the film holds an approval rating of 33% based on 15 reviews, with a weighted average of 5.30/10. On Metacritic, the film has a weighted average score of 32 out of 100, based on 6 critics, indicating "generally unfavorable reviews".

Dennis Harvey of Variety noted that, despite featuring few locations, the film "doesn't suffer from staginess or claustrophobia", though he pined for "more insight into the protagonists’ family, friends and community." Trace Thurman of Bloody Disgusting singled out James Caan, saying that he delivered "an understated performance with extremely minimal dialogue." Likewise, Michael Roffman of Consequence of Sound praised Caan's performance, but felt that it was lost in "erratic sequencing."
