= Craig Johnson (director) =

American screenwriter and film director

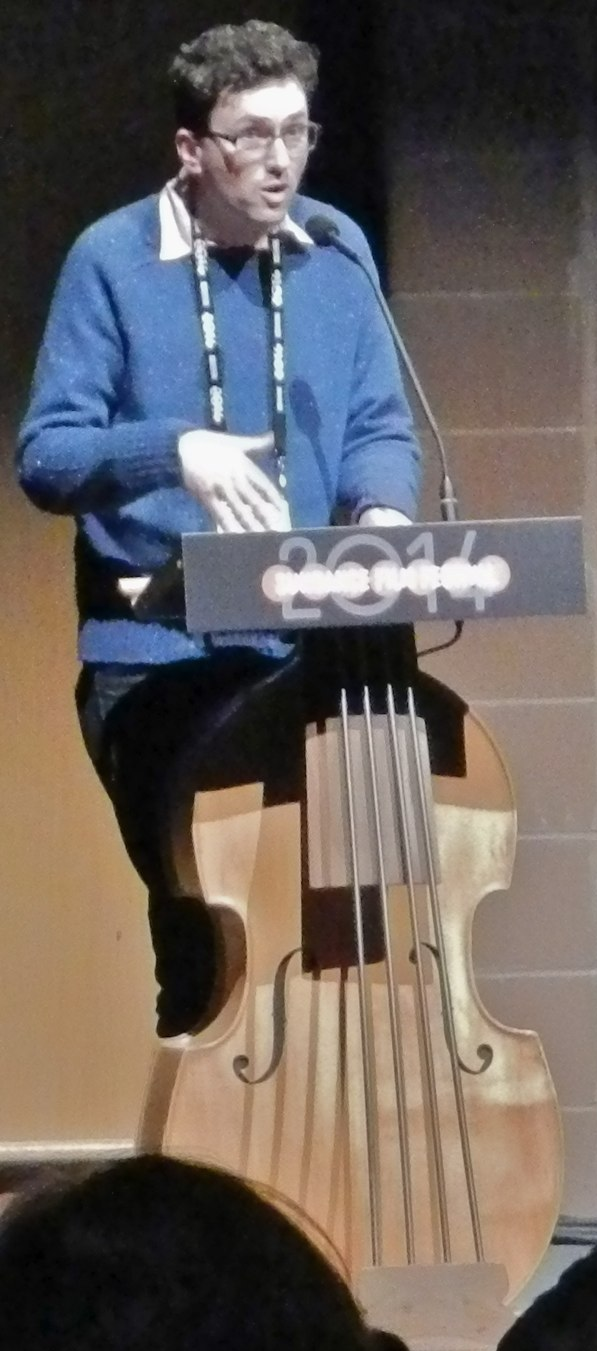
- Johnson in 2014
- Born: Bellingham, Washington, U.S.
- Occupations: Film director, screenwriter
- Known for: True Adolescents, The Skeleton Twins
- Spouse: Adam Roberts (m. 2015)

Craig Johnson is an American screenwriter and film director, known for his films True Adolescents (2009) and The Skeleton Twins (2014).

== Early life and education ==
Johnson was originally from Bellingham, Washington, where he studied theatre at the University of Washington and worked for several years in theatre, in sketch comedy and as an educational presenter at the Pacific Science Center.

In 2002, he moved to New York City to study filmmaking at the Tisch School of the Arts.

== Career ==
Johnson's thesis project for that program, True Adolescents, was released in 2009 as his first feature film. His second feature film, The Skeleton Twins, was released in 2014.

In 2017, Johnson directed Wilson, an adaptation of Daniel Clowes' graphic novel, starring Woody Harrelson and Laura Dern. The film was released by Fox Searchlight Pictures and received mixed reviews at Sundance Film Festival.

In 2018, Johnson wrote and directed Alex Strangelove, a teen comedy released by Netflix, starring Daniel Doheny and Antonio Marziale. The film received generally positive reviews.

In 2025, Johnson directed The Parenting, a horror-comedy starring Lisa Kudrow, Brian Cox, Edie Falco and Dean Norris. The film was released by Warner Bros. Pictures and HBO.

== Other activities ==
Johnson has also been credited in local stage and radio productions in Minnesota, including Yellow Tree Theatre’s "Pandemic Programming" series during 2020–21.

== Personal life ==
As of 2009, Johnson was living in Brooklyn, New York. Johnson is openly gay. On May 23, 2015, he married television writer Adam Roberts, his boyfriend of 9 years, in Los Angeles.

== Filmography ==
Film

Year	Title	Director	Writer
2009	True Adolescents	Yes	Yes
2014	The Skeleton Twins	Yes	Yes
2017	Wilson	Yes	No
2018	Alex Strangelove	Yes	Yes
2025	The Parenting	Yes	No

Television

Year	Title	Episode(s)
2015	Looking	"Looking for Sanctuary"
2020	Love Life	"Bradley Field"
2020	Love Life	"Magnus Lund"
2021	Special	"Ryan Joins the Crips"
2021	Special	"Prom Queens"
2021	Special	"Why Is No One Ready?"
2021	Special	"Here's Where the Story Ends"
2021	Gossip Girl	"Final Cancellation"
2022	Minx	"God save the Queen of Dicks"
2025	School Spirits	"Ghost Who's Coming to Dinner"
2025	School Spirits	"Ghost Pointe Blank"
