= Mary Pat Bentel =

American film producer

Mary Pat Bentel is a Los Angeles based independent film producer.

== Career ==
Bentel is known for producing Amateur Night starring Jason Biggs, The Lie starring Joshua Leonard and Jess Weixler, The Midnight Swim starring Lindsay Burdge, Aleksa Palladino, and Jennifer Lafleur, Animals starring David Dastmalchian, and Austin Found starring Linda Cardellini and Skeet Ulrich. Bentel also produced the series This Close for Sundance Channel.

== Filmography ==
Year	Film	Credit
2008	Just Add Water	Co-producer
2011	The Lie	
2013	Goodbye World	
2014	Animals	
2014	The Midnight Swim	
2016	Amateur Night	
2017	Austin Found	
2018	This Close	
2020	Holly Slept Over	executive producer
2022	Who Invited Them	
