= Jennifer Lafleur =

American actress (born 1979)

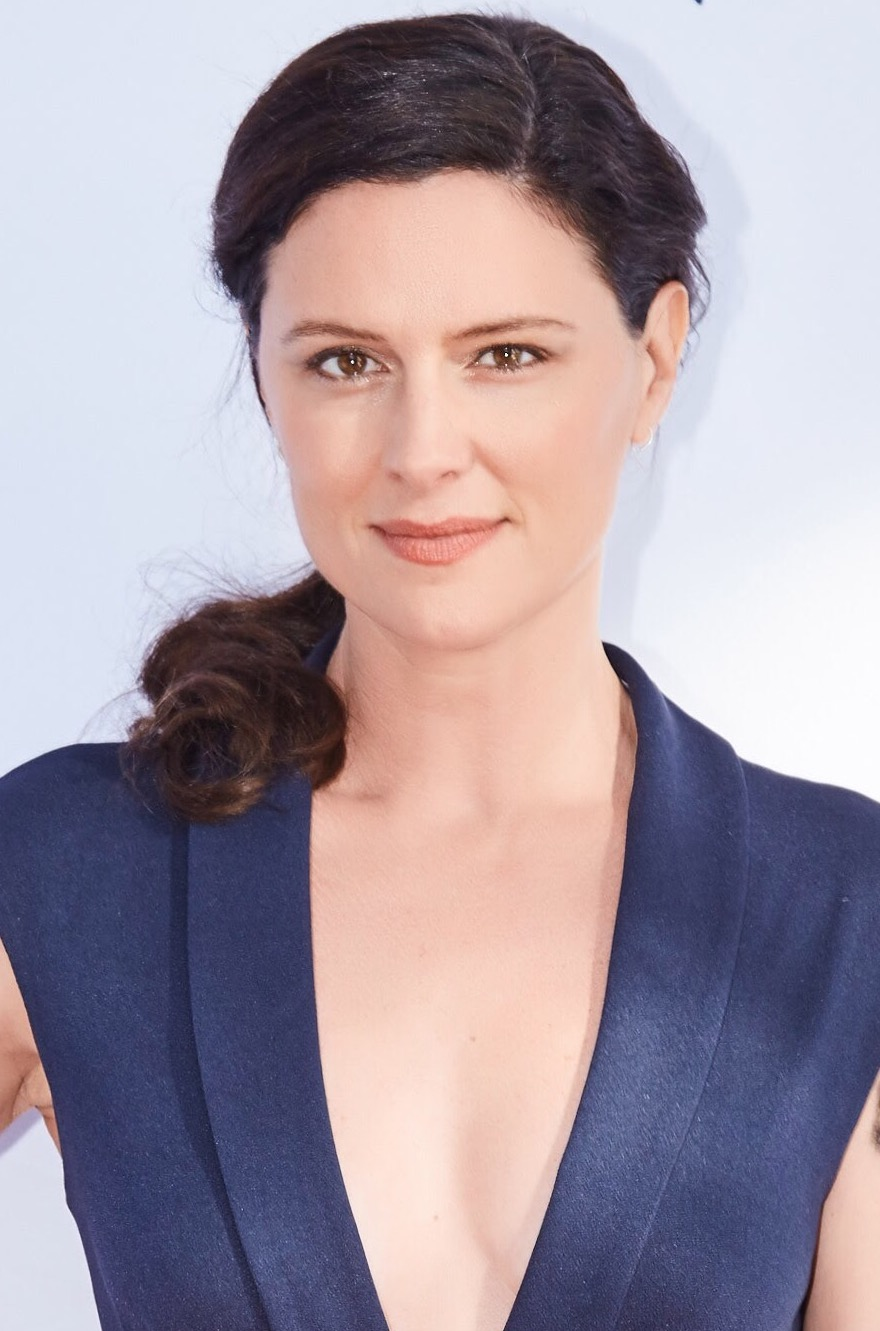
- Lafleur at the 2016 Los Angeles Film Festival
- Born: Ware, Massachusetts, U.S.
- Education: Westfield State University; Brandeis University
- Occupations: Actress; producer; writer
- Years active: 2006–present
- Spouse: Ross Partridge (m. 2016)
- Children: 1

Jennifer Lafleur is an American actress. She is known for appearing in the independent films The Do-Deca-Pentathlon (2012), The Pretty One (2013), The Midnight Swim (2014), MAD (2016) and 6 Years (2015). On television, Lafleur has appeared on the HBO series Big Little Lies, Room 104 and Animals., the Showtime series Billions, American Crime on ABC, Married on FX, Chicago Fire on NBC, Workaholics and Review on Comedy Central, Childrens Hospital and Newsreaders on Adult Swim, and Major Crimes on TNT.

== Personal life ==
Lafleur was born in Ware, Massachusetts, and grew up in Brookfield. Her father is an emergency room physician, and her mother is a firefighter, paramedic, and commands the local emergency ambulance service. Lafleur worked as an EMT for seven years throughout college and graduate school. She graduated summa cum laude from Westfield State University. She went on to receive her Master of Fine Arts in acting from Brandeis University.

On April 30, 2016, Lafleur married actor and director Ross Partridge, after dating for ten years.

On May 18, 2019, Jennifer delivered the commencement address at Westfield State University.

== Career ==
Lafleur began her acting career with small appearances in the films Baghead (2008), and Jeff, Who Lives at Home (2011), both of which were written and directed by Jay and Mark Duplass. In 2012, she had a major supporting role in their next film, The Do-Deca-Pentathlon, portraying the role of Stephanie.

In 2013, she co-starred as Marguerite in The Pretty One. In 2014, she had a main role in the indie thriller The Midnight Swim. She starred as Annie, one of three sisters who returns home when their mother goes missing after diving in a lake. She also created and starred in the webseries Wedlock which also stars Mark Duplass and Rob Corddry.

In 2015, Lafleur co-starred in Hannah Fidell's romantic drama 6 Years, in a cast led by Taissa Farmiga and Ben Rosenfield, and starred as Melissa in Ross Partridge's independent drama film Lamb.

== Filmography ==
=== Film ===
Year	Title	Role	Notes
2008	Baghead	Festival Director	
2009	Feed the Fish	Gwen	
2011	Tiny Miny Magic	Samantha Cabbage	Short film
2011	Jeff, Who Lives at Home	TV Announcer	
2012	The Do-Deca-Pentathlon	Stephanie	
2013	Sides & Rides	Unknown	Short film
2013	Where Does It Go from Here	Alice	Short film
2013	The Pretty One	Marguerite	
2013	Mutual Friends	Annie	
2014	The Middle Distance	Beth	
2014	The Skeleton Twins	Drunk Natalie	Uncredited
2014	New	Noelle	Short film
2014	The Men We Wanted to Marry	Emma	Short film
2014	The Midnight Swim	Annie	
2015	6 Years	Ms. Anders	
2015	Lamb	Melissa	
2015	The Middle Distance	Beth	
2015	Havenhurst	Lisa	
2016	Mad	Connie	
2016	Carbon	Quinn Bolibar	Short film
2016	Holidays	Dr. Harding	
2016	The Night Stalker	Young Elena	
2016	No Land and No Light Anywhere	Tanya	
2016	Six LA Love Stories	Amanda Selden	
2016	Buster's Mal Heart	Psychic Voice	
2017	Remember: Remember	Arielle	Short film
2017	6 Dynamic Laws for Success	Norma Seville	
2017	Limerence	May	
2017	Father Daughter Dance	Erin	Short film
2018	Back at the Staircase	Trisha	
2018	Making Babies	Danica	
2019	From Within	The Woman	Short film
2019	The Husband	Tracy	
2019	You Can Do This	Beth	Short film
2019	Light Years	Liz	
2019	Oleander	Kim	Short film
2019	Hungry Ghosts	Florence	Short film
2020	Baby Kate	Rebecca	Short film
2020	Fully Realized Humans	Beatrice	
2022	Nope	Phyllis Mayberry/Margaret Houston	

=== Television ===
Year	Title	Role	Notes
2007–2009	Guiding Light	Nurse Judy	9 episodes
2009	Bunker Hill	Flora	Television Pilot
2013	You're Whole	Cathy	Episode: "Droppin' the 'G'/Ancient Egypt/Puffy Paints"
2014	Review	Alicia	4 episodes
2014	Married	Cynthia	Episode: "Waffles & Pizza"
2014	Newsreaders	Julie Gifford	Episode: "Headless Football Player; Identity Thief"
2014	Wedlock	Fiona	Web series; 10 episodes
2015	Major Crimes	Melanie Greggs	Episode: "Personal Effects"
2016	Workaholics	Sigourney	Episode: "Death of a Salesdude"
2016	Animals.	Wife (voice)	Episode: "Rats"
2016	Childrens Hospital	Mother	Episode: "The Show You Watch"
2016	Billions	Nancy	Episode: "The Punch"
2017	American Crime	Dr. Carlson	Episode: #3.2
2017	Big Little Lies	Fiona	Episode: "Living The Dream"
2017	Chicago Fire	Mrs. Sullivan	Episode: "Take A Knee"
2017	Room 104	Karen / Diane	2 episodes
2019	Friends from College	Alex	Episode: "The Engagement Party"
2019	The Good Doctor	Lily Barstow	Episode: "Take My Hand"
2019	Castle Rock	Mallory	Episode: "The Laughing Place"
2020	Medical Police	Janet	Episode: "The Lasagna as a Whole"
