= Bonnie Nadzam =

American writer

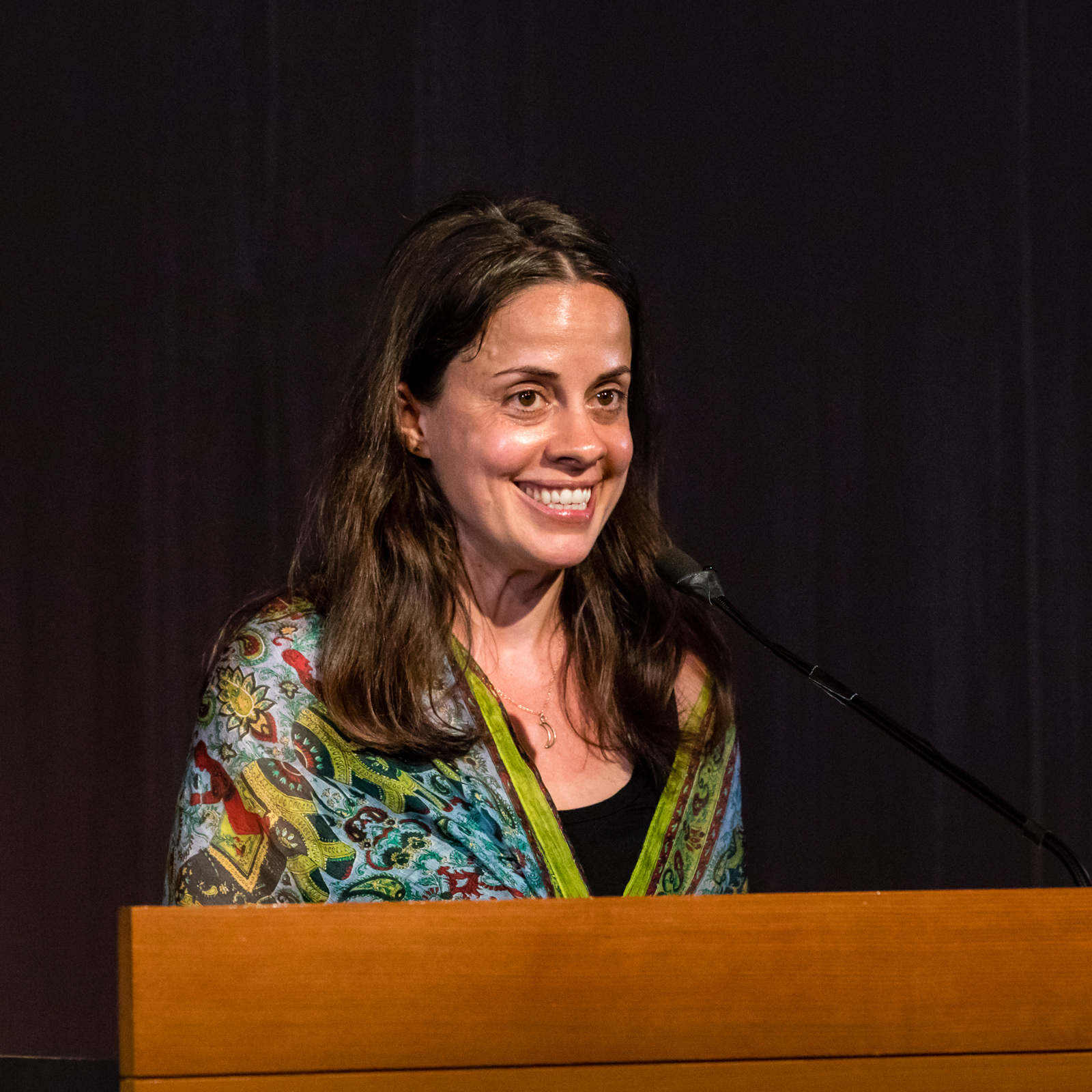
- Nadzam in 2018
- Born: Cleveland Heights, Ohio, U.S.
- Education: Carleton College (BA); Arizona State University (MFA); University of Southern California (MA, PhD)
- Occupation: Writer
- Writing career
- Notable awards: Center for Fiction First Novel Prize (2011)

Bonnie Nadzam is an American writer. She is a native of Cleveland Heights, Ohio.

== Education ==
She holds a Bachelor of Arts degree in English Literature and Environmental Studies from Carleton College, a Master of Fine Arts from Arizona State University (2004) and an MA and PhD from the University of Southern California (2010).

== Career ==
Her fiction, essays and poetry have appeared in Harper's Magazine, Orion, Granta, the Kenyon Review, The Alaska Quarterly Review, and many other journals. Her first novel, Lamb, was recipient of the Center for Fiction First Novel Prize, long-listed for the Baileys Women's Prize for Fiction in the UK, and was translated into several languages. The book was made into an award-winning independent film, Lamb, starring Ross Partridge and Oona Laurence and produced by Orchard.

Nadzam is co-author of Love in the Anthropocene with environmental ethicist Dale Jamieson. Her second novel, Lions, was released by Grove Atlantic in 2016 and was a Finalist for the PEN USA Literary Award in Fiction.
