= Becky Snyder =

Becky Snyder or Becky Snider may refer to:

- Becky Snyder of ABC-CLIO
- Becky Snyder of Annie (musical)
- Becky Snider, fictional character in Goodbye World
