= Laura Shepherd =

Laura Shepherd may refer to:

- Laura Shepherd, character in Goodbye World
- Laura Shepherd (filmmaker), director of Tales from the Cryptkeeper
