= Stephanie Langhoff =

American film and television producer

- Born: United States
- Occupation(s): Film producer, television producer

Stephanie Langhoff is an American film and television producer.

== Early life ==
Langhoff was raised in New Orleans and attended Mount Carmel Academy. During high school, she befriended Mark Duplass, with whom she would go on to work in the film industry. She graduated from the University of Virginia with a degree in economics.

== Career ==
Langhoff began her career as an investment banker before moving to film production at Revolution Studios, where she began as an assistant in 2001 and became an executive during her seven years of working there.

She was an actress in the movies Maid in Manhattan (2002) and Little Black Book (2004).

At Revolution Studios, she co-produced the 2007 film Perfect Stranger. When the company closed in 2007, she returned to New Orleans to work in the local independent film industry. She then partnered with filmmakers Jay and Mark Duplass, whom she had known as a teenager, at their production company, Duplass Brothers Productions. She was an associate producer of their 2011 film Jeff, Who Lives at Home and the producer of their 2012 film The Do-Deca-Pentathlon. She also produced Safety Not Guaranteed (2012), which starred Mark Duplass. She was appointed president of Duplass Brothers Productions in 2012. In 2014, Langhoff produced The Skeleton Twins, a comedy-drama film starring Kristen Wiig and Bill Hader as estranged fraternal twins. She also produced the film The Bronze (2015) and the HBO series Togetherness created by Jay and Mark Duplass in 2013 and premiered in 2015. Due to her ongoing work with the Duplass brothers, Langhoff has been referred to as "the honorary Duplass sister".

In 2017 Langhoff joined showrunner Tanya Saracho and Big Beach Productions as an executive producer on the television series Vida at Starz. Vida ran for three seasons, from 2018 to 2020. More recently, she started High Tide Productions and it signed a deal with Boat Rocker.

== Awards ==
- 2015: Sundance Institute Red Crown Producer's Award
- 2015: "10 Filmmakers to Watch in 2015" by The Independent magazine

== Personal life ==
In April 2017, she married Timothy Ellis, the chief marketing officer at Activision.
