= The Middle Distance =

- Poster
- Directed by: Patrick Underwood
- Written by: Patrick Underwood
- Produced by: Patrick Underwood
- Starring: Ross Partridge; Joslyn Jensen
- Cinematography: Kevin Duggin
- Edited by: Martin Bernfeld
- Release date: October 2015 (Chicago)
- Running time: 78 minutes 80 minutes
- Country: United States
- Language: English

The Middle Distance is a 2015 American romantic comedy drama film written and directed by Patrick Underwood and starring Ross Partridge and Joslyn Jensen.

== Cast ==
- Ross Partridge as Neil
- Joslyn Jensen as Rebecca
- Kentucker Audley as James
- Jennifer Lafleur as Beth

== Release ==
The film premiered at the Chicago International Film Festival in October 2015.

== Reception ==
Brian Tallerico of RogerEbert.com gave the film a negative review, describing it as “clichéd.”

Alissa Simon of Variety gave the film a mixed to positive review and wrote, “Clean, atmospheric lensing prevails over a formulaic script in Patrick Thomas Underwood's directing debut.”

Stephen Farber of The Hollywood Reporter gave the film a positive review and wrote that it “squeaks past the cliches, thanks to attractive performances and locations.”
