= Lamb (2015 American film) =

2015 film by Ross Partridge

- Theatrical release poster
- Directed by: Ross Partridge
- Written by: Ross Partridge
- Based on: Lamb by Bonnie Nadzam
- Produced by: Mel Eslyn; Taylor Williams; Jennifer Lafleur
- Starring: Ross Partridge; Oona Laurence; Jess Weixler; Tom Bower
- Cinematography: Nathan M. Miller
- Edited by: Christopher Donlon
- Music by: Daniel Belardinelli
- Production companies: The Shot Clock; Silent Helicopter
- Distributed by: The Orchard
- Release dates: March 14, 2015 (SXSW); January 8, 2016 (United States)
- Running time: 97 minutes
- Country: United States
- Language: English
- Box office: $30,844

Lamb is a 2015 American drama film, written and directed by Ross Partridge. The film was adapted from the novel of the same name by Bonnie Nadzam. The film stars Ross Partridge, Oona Laurence, Jess Weixler, and Tom Bower.

The film had its world premiere at the SXSW film festival on March 14, 2015. The film was released in a limited release on January 8, 2016, before being released through video on demand on January 12, 2016 by The Orchard.

== Plot ==
The film opens with David Lamb visiting his sick and dying father Walter Lamb. After visiting his father, David goes to his motel room, where he is currently living. David's father dies. After attending his father's burial, David ends up in a parking lot "in a particularly depressed-looking corner of Chicago," smoking, where Tommie is sent by her friends to ask David for a cigarette. When asked, David gives her a cigarette, and Tommie shows him her friends. David decides to scare her friends by pretending to kidnap her. He tries to prove a point to her and brings her home.

Back at David's work, his boss, Wilson, gives David his condolences, and insists that David take some time off work. Linny and David make passionate love in the office stairwell, after which David tells Linnie he is going away to his property in the country for a while to clear his head. David runs into Tommie at the parking lot, gives his name as "Gary" and offers to buy her lunch. Back at Tommie's home, her mother Linda, and her mother's boyfriend Jesse, ask where she has been, and Tommie lies, claiming that she was at a friend's house. The next day, Tommie and David hang out again; David asks Tommie to go on a camping trip for a week. He tells her he would bring her back before any one would start to worry. At a hotel, David tells Tommie he wants her to think if she really wants to stay, or go back home. He tells her this might look like a kidnapping due to their age differences so she can leave at any time. Tommie decides to stay.

At a truck stop, Melissa sees Tommie crying. Tommie lies and says her name is "Emily." Tommie tells David she wants to go home; he tells her he could take her home, like he said he would earlier. The next day, David and Tommie hang out by a lake. While there at the lake, Foster, a neighbor of theirs at the cabin, tells the two of them that they are on private property. David lies easily, telling him he's with his niece Emily (aka Tommie). Returning from the mountains, Tommie asks David if she could have a root beer; David asks Tommie to get him a beer; she asks if she can have some of the beer, and he agrees she can have one sip of it. Foster walks into the room, where he sees Tommie holding the beer. David pretends to yell at "Emily", sends her out of the room and apologizes to Foster about what happened. Foster warns David there are unfriendly neighbors nearby who don't like kids. One morning, David notices a car approaching the cabin; he hides Tommie in a closet and tells her not to be seen. The car turns out to be driven by Linny, who came to give David company.

David tells Tommie to run to the 'shop' (a back part of the cabin) quietly as she can. Later that night, Tommie asks David why Linny called him "David" instead of "Gary". He tells her, it's to "protect her/us". While David is talking to Tommie one morning, Linny walks in, and almost catches Tommie. Linny tells David she's going to get mattresses from the other room; David lies, since Tommie is hiding in that room, by telling her a fake ghost story about "Emily". Tommie is seen running from the cabin, to Foster's house. She returns to the outside of cabin and through the window witnesses David and Linny having sex. David notices that Tommie is watching. Outside the house, David/Gary holds Tommie/Emily and tells her a secret - that his younger brother left home and disappeared when he was very young, never coming home again. He makes her promise not to tell anyone, and to always call him "Gary."

Next morning Tommie walks into the cabin living room and calls Gary's name. Linny awakes with fright and wakes David (aka Gary) who claims that the girl is "Emily" who has been sick and has been staying here because of it. As Linny goes to drive away upset, David lies to her that "Emily" is the child of his brother who died and Linny says "you never told me that." He pleads with her to be patient with him but she drives off.

David tells Tommie they are going to head back home. In a motel on the way back he breaks down and cries, saying that Tommie will forget him as she grows older. She put hers hand on his shoulder and says "I won't." Once they arrive at their hometown, the two emotionally say goodbye. They will not see each other again, but he tells her he will leave signs, like a broken window, or a ribbon tied in a strange place so she'll know he's been around, and that when she closes her eyes and remembers the wind and the rain from their trip, she will be like an apple tree standing in the ashes of all the houses in her city.

The film ends with Tommie chasing after David as he drives away.

== Cast ==
- Ross Partridge as David Lamb
- Oona Laurence as Tommie
- Jess Weixler as Linny
- Tom Bower as Foster
- Scoot McNairy as Jesse
- Lindsay Pulsipher as Linda
- Jennifer Lafleur as Melissa
- Joel Murray as Wilson
- Ron Burkhardt as Walter Lamb

== Production ==
In July 2014, it was announced that Ross Partridge would be directing, starring, and writing the film, from Bonnie Nadzam's novel Lamb, with Mel Eslyn and Taylor Williams producing, with Jennifer Lafleur co-producing. That same day, it was announced that Oona Laurence had been cast portraying the role of Tommie, and Jess Weixler had also joined the film. Partridge later revealed in an interview with The New York Times he wanted to adapt the film immediately while reading the book.

=== Filming ===
Principal photography began on June 19, 2014, in Denver, Colorado, with additional filming taking place in Laramie, Wyoming. Production on the film lasted 18 days and concluded on July 9, 2014. Jennifer Lafleur revealed in an interview that all her scenes in the film were shot in a single day.

== Soundtrack ==
Lamb

Soundtrack album by Daniel Belardinelli
- Released: January 8, 2016
- Genre: Score
- Label: MovieScore Media

The soundtrack for the film, titled Lamb: Original Motion Picture Soundtrack, featuring the original score by Daniel Berlardinelli, was released via digital download on January 8, 2016, by MovieScore Media.

Track listing
No.	Title	Length
1.	"Lamb : Prelude"	2:20
2.	"Titles"	3:55
3.	"Store"	1:41
4.	"Kidnap"	1:20
5.	"Secret Trip"	2:41
6.	"On The Road"	1:51
7.	"Unfriendly Landowners"	1:47
8.	"The 14th Fence Post"	2:53
9.	"Visiting Foster"	1:46
10.	"Linny's Arrival"	1:37
11.	"Haunted Shed"	4:04
12.	"Linny Leaves"	1:47
13.	"Return to the City"	1:19
14.	"Count to Five"	2:24
15.	"Lamb : Postlude"	1:38

== Marketing ==
In November 2015, the first poster for the film was released. In December 2015, the trailer for the film was released exclusively by Apple Trailers. That same month, a clip from the film was released exclusively by IndieWire. In January 2016, The Film Stage released another clip from the film.

== Release ==
The film had its world premiere at the SXSW on March 14, 2015. The film went on to screen at the Sarasota Film Festival, the Montclair Film Festival. the Seattle International Film Festival. and the Torino Film Festival. Shortly after, it was announced The Orchard had acquired distribution rights to the film. The film was given a limited release on January 8, 2016, prior to being released through video on demand on January 12, 2016. In the United States, the Motion Picture Association rated the film R for some disturbing behavior, sexuality and language.

== Critical reception ==
Lamb received positive reviews from film critics. It holds an 83% "Fresh" rating on review aggregator website Rotten Tomatoes, based on 35 reviews, with an average rating of 6.6/10. On Metacritic, the film holds a rating of 62 out of 100, based on 12 critics, indicating "generally favorable" reviews.

Justin Chang of Variety gave the film a positive review, writing: "Partridge navigates risky material with assurance, delicacy and a deepening sense of intimacy that can turn, without warning, into complicity: The more at ease we feel in the characters’ company, the more disturbingly questionable the situation becomes. Superbly shot and movingly acted, especially by young Oona Laurence, this arthouse-ready item should prove a potent conversation-starter at festivals, where even naysayers may be hard pressed to deny the film’s cumulative emotional impact."

Kimber Myers of IndieWire gave the film a positive review, writing: "What’s interesting about Lamb is that it doesn’t stand in judgment of its protagonist; it neither condemns him for what are undeniably bad and illegal choices, nor does it celebrate them either. Though not always successful, this is a complicated film that should cause its audience to continue to think about its characters and the actions they take."

== Accolades ==
Producer Mel Eslyn received the Piaget Producer's Award at the 2015 Independent Spirit Awards.
