= Austin Found =

2017 satirical comedy film directed by Will Raee

- Film poster
- Directed by: Will Raee
- Written by: Brenna Graziano
- Story by: Will Raée
- Produced by: Mary Pat Bentel; Danny Costanzo; Gary Ousdahl; Robert Ruggeri
- Starring: Linda Cardellini; Skeet Ulrich; Craig Robinson
- Cinematography: Ketil Dietrichson
- Edited by: Todd Desrosiers; Michael Pedraza; Will Raée; Jeff Seibenick
- Music by: Ryan Franks; Scott Nickoley
- Production companies: Caspian Pictures; Costanzo Media; Omega Point Films
- Distributed by: Gravitas Ventures
- Release date: July 7, 2017
- Running time: 104 minutes
- Country: United States
- Language: English

Austin Found is a 2017 American satirical comedy film directed by Will Raee and starring Linda Cardellini, Skeet Ulrich and Craig Robinson.

== Premise ==
A former beauty queen and mother who is fed up with her mundane lifestyle hatches a scheme to make her family instant celebrities, but not everything goes as planned as her wild tempered ex-boyfriend starts to lose it.

== Cast ==
- Linda Cardellini as Leanne Wilson
- Skeet Ulrich as Billy Fontaine
- Craig Robinson as Jebidiah
- Ursula Parker as Patricia
- Kristen Schaal as Nancy
- Patrick Warburton as Chief Williams
- Jon Daly as Donald Wilson
- Chris Parnell as Alan Dickinson
- Matt Jones as Matt
- Meg DeLacy as Candy
- Reza Sixo Safai as Jose

== Reception ==
On review aggregator Rotten Tomatoes, the film holds an approval rating of 21% based on 14 reviews, with an average rating of 5/10.

Mick LaSalle of the San Francisco Chronicle gave the film a positive review, calling the film "Funny and Disturbing." Jeffrey M. Anderson of Common Sense Media gave the film two stars out of five. Derek Smith of Slant Magazine gave the film one star out of four. Sheila O'Malley of RogerEbert.com gave the film two stars out of four.
