= Tom Bower (actor) =

American actor (1938–2024)

- Bower in 2013
- Born: Ralph Thomas Bower; January 3, 1938; Denver, Colorado, U.S.
- Died: May 30, 2024 (aged 86); Los Angeles, California, U.S.
- Occupation: Actor
- Years active: 1973–2024

Ralph Thomas Bower (January 3, 1938 – May 30, 2024) was an American actor. He was best known for playing Marvin, a janitor in the 1990 film Die Hard 2. He appeared in a wide variety of television and film roles, including Nixon (as Francis A. Nixon) and The Bad Lieutenant: Port of Call New Orleans. He appeared in Chris Chan Lee's 2006 film Undoing.

Bower died in Los Angeles on May 30, 2024, at the age of 86.

== Filmography ==
=== Film ===
Year	Title	Role	Notes
1976	Two-Minute Warning	Decker, S.W.A.T. Team Member	
1978	The Dain Curse	Sergeant O'Gar	
1978	The Winds of Kitty Hawk	William Tate	
1982	The Ballad of Gregorio Cortez	Boone Choate	
1984	Wildrose	Rick Ogaard	
1984	Massive Retaliation	Kirk Fredericks	
1985	The Lightship	Coop	
1986	River's Edge	Detective Bennett	
1987	Beverly Hills Cop II	Russ Fielding	
1988	Split Decisions	Detective Walsh	
1988	Distant Thunder	Louis	
1989	True Believer	Cecil Skell	
1989	Wired	Detective	
1990	Die Hard 2	Marvin	
1991	Talent for the Game	Reverend Bodeen	
1992	Aces: Iron Eagle III	DEA Agent Warren Crawford	
1992	Raising Cain	Sergeant Cally	
1993	Relentless 3	Captain Phelan	
1994	Clear and Present Danger	Clark's pilot	Uncredited
1995	Far from Home: The Adventures of Yellow Dog	John Gale	
1995	Georgia	Erwin Flood	
1995	White Man's Burden	Stanley	
1995	Nixon	Frank Nixon	
1997	The Killing Jar	Jake Pestone	
1999	A Slipping-Down Life	Mr. Decker	
2000	The Million Dollar Hotel	Hector	
2000	Pollock	Dan Miller	
2001	Going Greek	Bill	
2001	Hearts in Atlantis	Len Files	
2002	High Crimes	FBI Agent Mullins	
2002	The Badge	'Bull' Hardwick	
2005	The Amateurs	Floyd	
2005	North Country	Gray Suchett	
2006	The Hills Have Eyes	Gas Station Attendant	
2006	Undoing	Don	
2006	Three	Uncle Eugene Parson	
2008	Familiar Strangers	Frank Worthington	
2008	Appaloosa	Abner Raines	
2008	Gospel Hill	Jack Herrod	
2009	Bad Lieutenant: Port of Call New Orleans	Pat McDonagh	
2009	For Sale by Owner	Sheriff O'Hare	
2009	Crazy Heart	Bill Wilson	
2010	The Killer Inside Me	Sheriff Bob Maples	
2011	I Melt with You	Captain Bob	
2013	Out of the Furnace	Dan Dugan	
2014	13 Sins	Father	
2014	The Ever After	Father O'Meara	
2014	Runoff	Scratch	
2015	Lamb	Foster	
2018	Light of My Life	Tom	
2019	El Camino: A Breaking Bad Movie	Lou	
2019	Senior Love Triangle	William Selig	
2020	Fully Realized Humans	Richard	
2023	We Have a Ghost	Ernest Scheller	
2025	Hurricanna	Dentist	

=== Television ===
Year	Title	Role	Notes
1974, 1976	The Rockford Files	Jeff Cooperman / Officer Hensley	2 episodes
1975	The Waltons	Rex Barker	Episode: "The Wing-Walker"
1976	The Bionic Woman	Ted Ryan	1 episode
1976–1978	The Waltons	Dr. Curtis Willard	Recurring role (seasons 5–6), guest episode (season 7)
1979	Lou Grant	Lind	1 episode
1979	Barnaby Jones	Baxter	1 episode
1981, 1986	Hill Street Blues	Narcotics Cop / De Petrus	2 episodes
1984	Murder, She Wrote	Jonathan Bailey	1 episode
1985	Misfits of Science	Jeffries	1 episode
1985	Miami Vice	Detective Carter	1 episode
1990	China Beach	Archie Winslow	Episode: "Thanks of a Grateful Nation"
1991	Love, Lies and Murder	Leverette	Miniseries, main cast
1994	Against the Wall	Ed	TV movie
1997	Buffalo Soldiers	General Pike	TV Movie
1998	Poodle Springs	Arnie Burns	TV Movie
1999	The X-Files	Sheriff Harden	1 episode
1999–2000	Roswell	Hubble	1 episode
2000	The West Wing	General Ed Barrie	1 episode
2002	The Laramie Project	Father Roger Schmit	TV movie
2005	Cold Case	Curtis Collins	Episode: "Best Friends"
2008	Monk	Bennie Wentworth	1 episode
2005, 2012	It's Always Sunny in Philadelphia	Heinrich "Pop-Pop" Landgraf	2 episodes
2013	Criminal Minds	Damon Miller	Episode: "Bully"
2013	Grey's Anatomy	Mr. Shultz	1 episode
2023	Lucky Hank	Henry Devereaux Sr.	3 episodes
