= Room 104 =

American anthology television series

- Genre: Anthology; Comedy; Drama; Horror; Thriller
- Created by: Mark Duplass; Jay Duplass
- Composer: Julian Wass
- Country of origin: United States
- Original language: English
- No. of seasons: 4
- No. of episodes: 48

Production
- Executive producers: Mark Duplass; Jay Duplass; Mel Eslyn; Sydney Fleischmann; Xan Aranda
- Running time: 21–29 minutes
- Production companies: HBO Entertainment; Duplass Brothers Productions

Original release
- Network: HBO
- Release: July 28, 2017 – October 9, 2020

Room 104 is an American anthology television series created by Mark Duplass and Jay Duplass, first broadcast on HBO between 2017 and 2020.

== Premise ==
Set in a single room of an American roadside motel, each episode explores different characters passing through Room 104, ranging widely across horror, thriller, and comedy genres.

== Production ==
The series received a 24-episode order and all the episodes were shot back-to-back as a cost-saving measure, and they were split into two 12-episode seasons. In a December 2018 interview, co-creator Mark Duplass revealed that the third season had already been filmed and edited, and he was writing season 4. According to Duplass, episodes of Room 104 are made for "a quarter" of the cost typically expected for HBO series. Episodes are conceived in a "think tank" by the writers where they come up with dozens of ideas, and then they reach out to filmmakers that they are interested in to direct the episodes. Episodes are filmed in a "fast and loose" manner; for example, Josephine Decker directed her episode in two days only using an iPhone. For the editing process, directors do not receive final cut, and Duplass screens the episodes to a group of 20 people who work at their company for feedback.

The series debuted July 28, 2017, on HBO. A twelve-episode second season aired between November 9 and December 15, 2018. On February 8, 2019, HBO revealed that a third season had been filmed and that the network were in talks for a fourth season renewal. The show's twelve-episode third season premiered on September 13, 2019. Filming for season 4 was completed by September 2019. HBO announced in May 2020 that the fourth season would conclude the series, which started airing July 24. and concluded on October 9, 2020.

== Reception ==
Room 104 has received generally positive reviews from critics. On Metacritic, the first season has a score of 65 out of 100 based on 22 reviews. On Rotten Tomatoes, it has an 87% approval rating with an average score of 6.85 out of 10 based on 39 reviews. The site's critical consensus reads, "Room 104 uses its anthology structure to its advantage, telling a series of short, eclectic stories that hit their marks more often than they miss."

Reviewing the entire second season, Ben Travers of IndieWire gave it a positive review with a "B+" grade. He wrote, "the variety of storytelling on display builds such tingly anticipation, each new episode is worth it even when the narrative disappoints" and that it is "such remarkable, refreshing television that even when it's bad, it's good".

== Episodes ==
Season	Episodes	Originally released	
Season	Episodes	First released	Last released
1	12	July 28, 2017	October 13, 2017
2	12	November 9, 2018	December 15, 2018
3	12	September 13, 2019	November 29, 2019
4	12	July 24, 2020	October 9, 2020

=== Season 1 (2017) ===
No. overall	No. in season	Title	Directed by	Written by	Original release date	U.S. viewers (millions)
1	1	"Ralphie"	Sarah Adina Smith	Mark Duplass	July 28, 2017	0.249
Meg is hired by a man to babysit his pre-teen son Ralph for one night in Room 104. She is initially amused when Ralph warns her that "Ralphie", a bad boy, is locked in the bathroom, and that they need to keep quiet so they do not wake Ralphie. Thinking he is an imaginary friend, Meg at first humors Ralph, but becomes scared after Ralph goes into the bathroom dressed normally but returns in only underwear and a towel as a cape calling himself Ralphie; he attacks her. Ralphie goes back to the bathroom and Ralph returns dressed normally. Ralph tells Meg that he and his dad say his mother hanged herself but he says the true story is Ralphie killed her. After talking too loudly, Ralph says Ralphie has woken again. This time both Ralph and Ralphie emerge from the bathroom at the same time. Ralphie suffocates Ralph to death on the bed and then attacks her on the floor. Meg overpowers Ralphie and strangles him to death. Ralph's father returns to find Meg strangling Ralph and when she looks to the bed sees no body there and sees the body she was strangling was dressed as Ralph. Cast: Melonie Diaz, Ross Partridge, Ethan Kent, Gavin Kent
2	2	"Pizza Boy"	Patrick Brice	Mark Duplass	August 4, 2017	0.426
A pizza delivery boy is drawn into a couple's bizarre sex game where the wife attempts to seduce the delivery boy while the husband goes to get cash to pay for the pizza. She leaves when the husband returns and he accuses delivery boy of having sex with the wife and ties up the delivery boy. The wife returns and the couple have sex, apparently aroused by their fight and by having someone watch. After sex the delivery boy is seen wearing a suit, he offers the couple pointers on their performance and pays them, the whole situation having been one of the "delivery boy" auditioning actors to perform immersive sexual role play for his voyeuristic clients. Cast: Clark Duke, James Van Der Beek, Davie-Blue
3	3	"The Knockandoo"	Sarah Adina Smith	Carson Mell	August 11, 2017	0.438
A spiritually-hungry woman is visited by a cult priest. She remembers that when she was a child, a boy showed her his penis and she hit it with a rock. Cast: Sameerah Luqmaan-Harris, Orlando Jones, Tony Todd, Jenny Leonhardt
4	4	"I Knew You Weren't Dead"	So Yong Kim	Mark Duplass	August 18, 2017	0.305
A 42-year-old guest, whose wife wants to split up with him, seeks advice from the ghost of his college best friend who accidentally drowned in his early twenties. Cast: Jay Duplass, Will Tranfo, Frank Ashmore
5	5	"The Internet"	Doug Emmett	Mark Duplass	August 25, 2017	0.393
In 1997, a young Indian man desperately tries to teach his mother, over the phone, how to use his laptop to send a copy of the novel he has been writing. She accidentally deletes his novel, so he tells her to take it to a computer shop so that the staff can try to retrieve it. Cast: Karan Soni, Poorna Jagannathan
6	6	"Voyeurs"	Dayna Hanson	Dayna Hanson	September 1, 2017	0.240
An episode told through interpretive dance, with very little dialogue. A middle-aged maid and former call girl reconnects with her younger self. Cast: Dendrie Taylor, Sarah Hay
7	7	"The Missionaries"	Megan Griffiths	Mark Duplass	September 8, 2017	0.366
Two Mormons test their faith and their attraction to each other. Cast: Adam Foster, Nat Wolff
8	8	"Phoenix"	Ross Partridge	Story by : Xan Aranda and Ross Partridge; Teleplay by : Ross Partridge	September 15, 2017	0.375
In 1969, the sole (apparent) survivor of a plane crash finds herself in the room, covered in mud, cuts and bruises. She contemplates whether to go back to her old life with her husband. Cast: Amy Landecker, Mae Whitman
9	9	"Boris"	Chad Hartigan	Ross Partridge	September 22, 2017	0.333
An alcoholic Croatian retired tennis player forms a bond with a housekeeper when he reveals memories of his tortured past growing up in war torn Croatia during the early 1990s while she in turn reveals her status as an undocumented immigrant. Cast: Konstantin Lavysh, Veronica Falcón
10	10	"Red Tent"	Anna Boden & Ryan Fleck	Anna Boden & Ryan Fleck	September 29, 2017	0.343
A young man planning to detonate an explosive at a political convention is interrupted by an air conditioning repairman, causing him to reconsider his plan. Cast: Keir Gilchrist, Hugo Armstrong
11	11	"The Fight"	Megan Griffiths	Mark Duplass	October 6, 2017	0.307
Two female MMA fighters collude to earn a bigger payout by throwing their upcoming match. They engage in a private competition to determine who will win the fight. Cast: Natalie Morgan, Keta Meggett
12	12	"My Love"	Marta Cunningham	Mark Duplass	October 13, 2017	0.225
An elderly couple relive their first night together. Cast: Philip Baker Hall, Ellen Geer

=== Season 2 (2018) ===
No. overall	No. in season	Title	Directed by	Written by	Original release date	U.S. viewers (millions)
13	1	"FOMO"	Ross Partridge	Mark Duplass	November 9, 2018	0.216
A young woman celebrates her birthday with her friends, but things go downhill when her sister arrives unexpectedly. Cast: Lo Mutuc, (Note: Credited as Charlyne Yi) Tom Lenk, Pia Shah, Jennifer Lafleur
14	2	"Mr. Mulvahill"	Ross Partridge	Mark Duplass	November 10, 2018	0.147
A man confronts his former third-grade teacher, seeking a confession about their shared past. Cast: Rainn Wilson, Frank Birney
15	3	"Swipe Right"	Liza Johnson	Liza Johnson	November 16, 2018	0.220
An eccentric Russian political technologist arranges a first date with a veterinary nurse after meeting her via the internet. Cast: Michael Shannon, Judy Greer, Katya Zamolodchikova
16	4	"Hungry"	Patrick Brice	Mark Duplass	November 17, 2018	0.179
Two strangers meet to fulfill a mutual fantasy, but are interrupted by a suspicious police officer. This episode is based on true events. Cast: Mark Proksch, Kent Osborne, Michole Briana White
17	5	"The Woman in the Wall"	Gaby Hoffmann	Story by : Esti Giordani; Teleplay by : Mark Duplass	November 23, 2018	0.133
A sickly woman seeks comfort from a disembodied voice that claims to live inside the walls. Cast: Dolly Wells, Leonora Pitts
18	6	"Arnold"	Julian Wass	Mark Duplass & Julian Wass	November 24, 2018	0.127
Presented as a musical, a man attempts to piece together his memories of the previous night and the woman he met. Cast: Brian Tyree Henry, Ginger Gonzaga
19	7	"The Man and the Baby and the Man"	Josephine Decker	Story by : Josephine Decker; Teleplay by : Josephine Decker & Onur Tukel	November 30, 2018	0.164
A couple experiences difficulties while recording a video – which they plan to show their future child – of their attempts to conceive. Cast: Josephine Decker, Onur Tukel
20	8	"A Nightmare"	Jonah Markowitz	Mark Duplass	December 1, 2018	0.135
A young woman finds herself unable to escape a series of increasingly disturbing nightmares, some involving her mother. Cast: Natalie Morales, Marlene Forte
21	9	"The Return"	So Yong Kim	Mark Duplass	December 7, 2018	0.146
A widow brings her young daughter to Room 104 to help the girl cope with her father's death. Cast: Stephanie Allynne, Abby Ryder Fortson
22	10	"Artificial"	Natalie Morales	Mark Duplass	December 8, 2018	0.186
An apparent android attempts to convince a skeptical reporter of the true nature of both of their existences. Cast: Katie Aselton, Sheaun McKinney
23	11	"Shark"	Mark Duplass	Mark Duplass	December 14, 2018	0.106
A pool shark and his disillusioned cousin clash over their conflicting views of the hustling game. Cast: Mahershala Ali, James Earl III
24	12	"Josie & Me"	Lila Neugebauer	Lauren Budd	December 15, 2018	0.120
A playwright searching for inspiration asks her younger self to reenact the events of a harrowing night from her college years. Cast: Mary Wiseman

=== Season 3 (2019) ===
No. overall	No. in season	Title	Directed by	Written by	Original release date	U.S. viewers (millions)
25	1	"The Plot"	Macon Blair	Macon Blair	September 13, 2019	0.274
Decades in the past, a brother and sister have a tense meeting regarding the development of the hotel that will contain Room 104, complicated by the arrival of a demonic transient. Cast: Luke Wilson, Christine Woods, Eric Edelstein
26	2	"Animal for Sale"	Patrick Brice	Patrick Brice	September 20, 2019	0.250
The irresponsible caretaker of a gorilla meets with a professional who wants to buy the animal from him, but things do not go as planned. Cast: Robert Longstreet, Dale Dickey, Tom Woodruff Jr.
27	3	"Itchy"	Patrick Brice	Mark Duplass	September 27, 2019	0.219
A man with a mysterious skin condition records a series of increasingly revelatory video messages for his doctor. Cast: Arturo Castro, François Chau, Gina Gallego
28	4	"Rogue"	Jenée LaMarque	Jenée LaMarque & Julian Wass	October 4, 2019	0.161
Following an apocalyptic event, a traumatized teenage girl and a psychically gifted scavenger find common ground in their struggle for the future. Cast: James Babson, Iyana Halley, Catalina Sandino Moreno
29	5	"Drywall Guys"	Shira Piven; Doug Emmett	Mark Duplass	October 11, 2019	0.251
A man's patience is tested as he must contend with his coworker's chronic sleepwalking problem. Cast: Sam Richardson, Steve Little, Fred Melamed
30	6	"A New Song"	Mark Duplass	Mark Duplass & Mel Eslyn	October 18, 2019	0.164
A tormented singer-songwriter grapples with her own insecurities - and those of her ex-girlfriend - while attempting to create a new song. Cast: Julianna Barwick, Atsuko Okatsuka
31	7	"Jimmy & Gianni"	Doug Emmett	Mark Duplass	October 25, 2019	0.161
A documentary about real-life father and son artists who, invited to use the Room 104 set as a canvas, discuss the personal struggles in their past and the nuances of their craft. Cast: Jimmy Ray Flynn, Gianni Arone
32	8	"No Hospital"	Miguel Arteta	Miguel Arteta	November 1, 2019	0.215
A dying man with unique abilities attempts to settle his affairs with his daughter, who was reluctant to learn his powers, and his son, who misused them. Cast: Tony Plana, Angie Cepeda, Julian Acosta, Timm Sharp
33	9	"Prank Call"	So Yong Kim	Mark Duplass	November 8, 2019	0.256
Left alone, a teenage girl makes prank calls to entertain herself, but one takes a very dark turn spurred on by her alternate personality. Cast: Mary Mouser, Macon Blair, Carl De Gregorio, Kristina Harrison, Meilee Condron
34	10	"Night Shift"	Benjamin Kasulke	Benjamin Kasulke & Mark Duplass	November 15, 2019	0.281
Two actors who co-created a 1970s horror television series reunite and discuss their falling out, but when old tensions resurface, the show proves to be much more than mere fiction. Cast: Josh Fadem, Marielle Scott, David Paymer
35	11	"Crossroads"	Patrick Brice	Sam Bain	November 22, 2019	0.132
Fifty years after a woman sells her soul to the devil to live a rebellious rock-and-roll lifestyle, she strikes a mutually beneficial deal with his disgruntled assistant. Cast: Paul F. Tompkins, June Squibb, Aislinn Paul, Jon Bass, Lily Mae Harrington
36	12	"The Specimen Collector"	Mel Eslyn	Mel Eslyn	November 29, 2019	0.137
When exposure to a mysterious plant specimen transforms Room 104 into a lush jungle ecosystem, a scientist tries desperately to preserve the phenomena within. Cast: Cobie Smulders, Aasif Mandvi, J.P. Giuliotti

=== Season 4 (2020) ===
No. overall	No. in season	Title	Directed by	Written by	Original release date	U.S. viewers (millions)
37	1	"The Murderer"	Mark Duplass	Mark Duplass	July 24, 2020	0.091
An eccentric, troubled musician performs for a group of five friends, but his dark past causes tension. Cast: Mark Duplass, Hari Nef, Logan Miller, Pablo Castelblanco, Kenton Chen, Michael Sturgis
38	2	"Star Time"	Karan Soni	Mark Duplass	July 31, 2020	0.165
A woman with an extensive history of drug addiction must confront and learn from her past mistakes before it's too late. Cast: Jillian Bell, Jon Bass, Bernard David Jones
39	3	"Avalanche"	Ross Partridge	Mark Duplass	August 7, 2020	0.183
A therapist tries to help her patient, a retired professional wrestler, remember the specifics of traumatic events in his past. Cast: Dave Bautista, Natalie Woolams-Torres, Tim Gilbert, Eric Girard
40	4	"Bangs"	Jenée LaMarque	Jenée LaMarque & Lauren Parks	August 14, 2020	0.231
A magical pair of scissors helps a recently divorced woman come to grips with her desire for stability in her life. Cast: Melissa Fumero, Vivian Bang, Finn Roberts, Adam Shapiro, Breeda Wool
41	5	"Oh, Harry!"	Mel Eslyn	Mel Eslyn	August 21, 2020	0.228
A confused man finds himself stuck inside a 1990s sitcom with a family he does not know. Cast: Kevin Nealon, Erinn Hayes, Sadie Stanley, Ron Funches, Jason David, Skylar Gray
42	6	"The Hikers"	Lauren Budd	Lauren Budd	August 28, 2020	0.292
Two friends taking a break from a cross-country hike must reconcile a potentially permanent rift in their friendship. Cast: Shannon Purser, Kendra Carelli
43	7	"Foam Party"	Natalie Morales	Bryan Poyser	September 4, 2020	0.152
Things go awry during a mid-1990s foam party when the foam turns out to have bizarre, unforeseen qualities. Cast: Benjamin Papac, Alison Jaye, Timothy Granaderos, Olivia Crocicchia, Harvey Guillen
44	8	"No Dice"	Patrick Brice	Julian Wass	September 11, 2020	0.274
An arrogant game show host gets more than he bargained for during an arranged meeting with his self-proclaimed biggest fan. Cast: Linda Lavin, Jennifer Kim, Terrence T. Terrell, Gary Cole
45	9	"The Last Man"	Julian Wass	Mark Duplass	September 18, 2020	0.161
Told as a musical, a pair of time-traveling warriors build towards a climactic and revelatory final battle. Cast: Kevin McKidd, Desean Terry, Suzanne Nichols, Tom Michelsen, Zakary Risinger, Michael Ray Taylor
46	10	"The Night Babby Died"	Jenée LaMarque	Jenée LaMarque & Julian Wass	September 25, 2020	0.224
A man attempts to use an old video game to revive his relationship with a childhood friend, but the two must confront some uncomfortable truths in the process. Cast: Leonardo Nam, Lily Gladstone
47	11	"Fur"	Mel Eslyn	Mel Eslyn	October 2, 2020	0.099
Presented in an animated format, two teenage girls in 1987 must use the abilities at their disposal to defend themselves against an unruly high school boy they invited to their hotel room. Cast: Jordyn Lucas, Natasha Perez, Jake Green
48	12	"Generations"	Sydney Fleischmann	Julian Wass	October 9, 2020	0.168
After decades of painful experiences aboard a spacecraft as part of a lifelong mission, a man reluctantly prepares for a culminating ceremony. Cast: Ntare Mwine, Rebecca Hazlewood, Susan Park, Kristina Hanna, Saidah Ekulona Arrika, Christopher Farrah, Kaya Rose Davis

== See also ==
- Hotel Room, another HBO series with a similar premise, which aired in 1993
- Inside No. 9, a British series with a similar premise, produced by the BBC
