= Fully Realized Humans =

- Film poster
- Directed by: Joshua Leonard
- Written by: Joshua Leonard; Jess Weixler
- Produced by: Sean Drummond; Chelsea Bo; Joshua Leonard
- Starring: Joshua Leonard; Jess Weixler; Tom Bower; Beth Grant; Michael Chieffo; Janicza Bravo; Erica Chidi Cohen; Zach Shields; Jennifer Lafleur; Ross Partridge
- Cinematography: Benjamin Kasulke
- Edited by: Joshua Leonard; Chelsea Bo
- Music by: Peter Raeburn; Luke Fabia
- Production companies: Perception Media; Paxeros
- Distributed by: Gravitas Ventures
- Release dates: August 8, 2020 (Florida Film Festival); July 30, 2021 (United States)
- Running time: 76 minutes
- Country: United States
- Language: English

Fully Realized Humans is a 2020 American comedy film directed, produced, and edited by Joshua Leonard, from a screenplay by Leonard and Jess Weixler. It stars Leonard, Weixler, Tom Bower, Beth Grant, Michael Chieffo, Janicza Bravo, Erica Chidi Cohen, Zach Shields, Jennifer Lafleur and Ross Partridge.

The film premiered at the 2020 Florida Film Festival. It was previously scheduled to premiere at the 2020 Tribeca Film Festival, but the festival was postponed due to the COVID-19 pandemic. It is scheduled to be released on July 30, 2021, by Gravitas Ventures.

== Plot ==
With less than a month until the birth of their first child, Jackie and Elliot embark on a madcap odyssey of self-discovery in attempt to rid themselves of the inherited dysfunction of their own upbringings.

== Cast ==
- Joshua Leonard as Elliot
- Jess Weixler as Jackie
- Beth Grant as Tipper
- Tom Bower as Richard
- Michael Chieffo as Bob
- Erica Chidi Cohen as Maya
- Janicza Bravo as Mare
- Zach Shields as Zach
- Ross Partridge as Barry
- Jennifer Lafleur as Beatrice

== Release ==
The film was shown virtually at the Florida Film Festival on August 8, 2020. It was previously scheduled to have its world premiere at the Tribeca Film Festival on April 18, 2020, but the festival was postponed due to the COVID-19 pandemic. It also screened virtually at the Nashville Film Festival starting October 1, 2020. In May 2021, Gravitas Ventures acquired distribution rights to the film, and set it for a July 30, 2021, release.
