= Abby Ryder Fortson =

American actress (born 2008)

- Abby Ryder Fortson at the 2026 Sundance Film Festival
- Born: March 14, 2008 (age 18); Burbank, California, U.S.
- Occupation: Actress
- Years active: 2013–present
- Mother: Christie Lynn Smith

Abby Ryder Fortson (born March 14, 2008) is an American actress. She played Ella Novak in Transparent, Harper Weil in The Whispers, Sophie Pierson in Togetherness, Cassie Lang in Ant-Man (2015) and Ant-Man and the Wasp (2018), and Margaret Simon in Are You There God? It's Me, Margaret. (2023).

She is the daughter of actress Christie Lynn Smith and her husband, John Fortson.

On January 6, 2024, Fortson was honored with the Star on the Rise Award at the 2024 Astra Awards of the Hollywood Creative Alliance.

== Filmography ==
=== Film ===
Year	Title	Role	Notes
2014	Playing It Cool	Little Girl	
2015	Ant-Man	Cassie Lang	
2018	Forever My Girl	Billy Anne Page	
2018	Ant-Man and the Wasp	Cassie Lang	
2019	A Dog's Journey	Young C.J.	
2023	Are You There God? It's Me, Margaret.	Margaret Simon	
2024	Griffin in Summer	Kara	
2026	Carousel	Maya	

=== Television ===
Year	Title	Role	Notes
2013	The Mindy Project	Clementine	1 episode
2014	Transparent	Ella Novak	Recurring role (season 1)
2015	The Whispers	Harper Weil	Recurring role
2015–16	Togetherness	Sophie Pierson	Recurring role (season 1), main cast (season 2)
2016	Miles from Tomorrowland	Neeri	1 episode; voice role
2018	Trolls: The Beat Goes On!	Priscilla	1 episode; voice role
2018	Room 104	Elle	1 episode
2019	T.O.T.S.	Tara the Tapir	1 episode; voice role
2020	DuckTales	Little Girl	2 episodes; voice role
2020	Tales from the Loop	Young Loretta	2 episodes
2020–21	Trolls: TrollsTopia	Priscilla	3 episodes; voice role
2025	The Pitt	Kristi Wheeler	Recurring role, 4 episodes
2027	Scooby-Doo: Origins	Velma Dinkley	Main role

=== Music videos ===
Year	Title	Artist	Role	Ref.
2025	"Spirit In The Sky"	Norman Greenbaum	Sam	
