= Togetherness (TV series) =

American comedy-drama television series

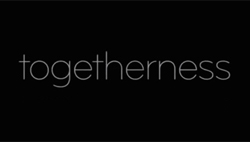
- Genre: Comedy drama
- Created by: Jay Duplass; Mark Duplass; Steve Zissis
- Written by: Jay Duplass; Mark Duplass
- Directed by: Jay Duplass; Mark Duplass; Nicole Holofcener
- Starring: Mark Duplass; Melanie Lynskey; Amanda Peet; Steve Zissis; Abby Ryder Fortson
- Composer: Michael Andrews
- Country of origin: United States
- Original language: English
- No. of seasons: 2
- No. of episodes: 16

Production
- Executive producers: Jay Duplass; Mark Duplass; Stephanie Langhoff
- Producer: Steve Zissis
- Production location: Los Angeles
- Camera setup: Single camera
- Running time: 25–29 minutes
- Production companies: Duplass Brothers Productions; HBO Entertainment

Original release
- Network: HBO
- Release: January 11, 2015 – April 10, 2016

Togetherness is an American comedy-drama television series created by Mark Duplass, Jay Duplass and Steve Zissis. It is primarily written and directed by the Duplass brothers, and stars Mark Duplass, Melanie Lynskey, Amanda Peet, Steve Zissis, and Abby Ryder Fortson. The series focuses on themes such as marriage and friendship.

The show's first season premiered on HBO on January 11, 2015. The series was renewed for an eight-episode second season, which premiered on February 21, 2016.

On March 25, 2016 Togetherness was canceled after two seasons.

== Cast ==
=== Main ===
- Mark Duplass as Brett Pierson, a sound editor and Michelle's husband
- Melanie Lynskey as Michelle Pierson, Brett's wife
- Amanda Peet as Tina Morris, Michelle's sister
- Steve Zissis as Alex Pappas, an aspiring actor and Brett's best friend
- Abby Ryder Fortson as Sophie Pierson, Brett and Michelle's daughter (recurring season 1, starring season 2)

=== Recurring ===
- Peter Gallagher as Larry Kozinski, a producer and Tina's boyfriend
- John Ortiz as David Garcia, a single father who becomes involved with Michelle
- Joshua Leonard as Dudley Walker, a director
- Mary Steenburgen as Linda, a free spirited woman who becomes Brett's friend (season 1)
- Amy Adair as Peggy, the Pierson's babysitter (season 1)
- Ginger Gonzaga as Christy, a film industry worker and Alex's girlfriend (season 2)
- Katie Aselton as Anna, a helper in Michelle's school plan (season 2)
- Emily Althaus as Natalie, a woman Brett meets while working for Uber (season 2)

== Episodes ==
Season	Episodes	Originally released	
Season	Episodes	First released	Last released
1	8	January 11, 2015	March 8, 2015
2	8	February 21, 2016	April 10, 2016

=== Season 1 (2015) ===
No. overall	No. in season	Title	Directed by	Written by	Original release date	U.S. viewers (millions)
1	1	"Family Day"	Jay Duplass & Mark Duplass	Story by : Jay Duplass & Mark Duplass & Steve Zissis; Teleplay by : Jay Duplass & Mark Duplass	January 11, 2015	0.427
When Alex, a struggling actor, is evicted from his apartment, his best friend Brett tries to convince him to stay in Los Angeles and lets him move in temporarily. Meanwhile, Brett's wife, Michelle has her sister Tina in town from Houston. After a day at the beach, Tina receives a text from her boyfriend that he wants to break up which makes her furious. The four of them have a night out, in which Tina spots her ex with a new girl and confronts him in public, causing a scene. Alex is able to comfort Tina and they later vandalize his house with toilet paper. At home, Brett asks Michelle why they don't have sex anymore, in which she responds "I don't know". After deciding not to go back to Houston, Tina, now along with Alex, are living with Brett and Michelle.
2	2	"Handcuffs"	Jay Duplass & Mark Duplass	Jay Duplass & Mark Duplass	January 18, 2015	0.426
Tina encourages Michelle to try and spice up her sex life with Brett. Alex helps Tina for the day, and she decides to be his trainer and help get him into shape so he can strive for leading roles. Brett gets into an argument at work with the director for a film he's working on as a sound designer. After work, Brett comes home to find Michelle dressed up and she tells him to go to the bedroom. Michelle tries to improve their predictable sex life, however, it doesn't go as planned.
3	3	"Insanity"	Jay Duplass & Mark Duplass	Jay Duplass & Mark Duplass	January 25, 2015	0.472
Tina begins coaching Alex with a workout routine. Brett, along with Tina and Alex go to the movie premiere for the film he worked on, while Michelle stays at home. Tina encourages Alex to try to make connections with movie producers at the event, while Brett apologizes to the director for his previous behavior. When the babysitter shows up, Michelle decides to go out for the night, instead of joining the others at the premiere event. She goes to a bar and later ends up at a city hall meeting where she meets David, a divorced father who wants to start a charter school. Alex is eventually able to talk with Larry Kosinski, a big time movie producer, and it goes well. When leaving the event, Alex realizes Tina is going home with Larry, leaving him devastated.
4	4	"Houston, We Have a Problem"	Jay Duplass & Mark Duplass	Jay Duplass & Mark Duplass	February 8, 2015	0.271
Tina and Alex fly to Houston so she can pack her things and bring them back to Los Angeles. On a night out, one of Tina's friends, Pam, takes an interest in Alex and they dance. Tina then grabs a guy and start dancing as well, trying out-do each other. Alex is about to leave with Pam but Tina insists that they go home. On the car ride home, Alex confronts Tina about what she did, but she says that he shouldn't have sex with Pam because she's her friend. At home, Tina apologizes and thanks him for coming and "being my friend". Brett takes Michelle out for a romantic evening of dinner and books a hotel room. Brett, feeling Michelle's anxiousness, decides to take "sex off the table", leaving her relieved. After watching a movie, she decides she wants to have sex because "it's important". They have their routine sex, but the mood is broken when she begins making suggestions for improvement, causing Brett to become frustrated and they fight. After, Brett apologizes and they agree they should see a therapist.
5	5	"Kick the Can"	Jay Duplass & Mark Duplass	Story by : Jay Duplass & Mark Duplass; Teleplay by : Jay Duplass & Mark Duplass and Amanda Lasher	February 15, 2015	0.231
After an intense session of couples therapy, Michelle plans a day of fun and invites friends to play kickball, while Brett tries to seem enthused with the idea. While Michelle is reserving the field, a group of adolescent hipsters say they have already reserved the field to play kick the can and they won't share the field even after Michelle tries to negotiate with them. Michelle then challenges them to a game of kick the can, which they agree to. During the game, Tina and Alex are hiding in a closet and he drunkenly kisses her. They kiss for a while but Tina slaps him and storms off. Brett tells Michelle that he's faking his enthusiasm and that he's incapable of having fun. Michelle, who is now the only person left on her team, spots David and calls him over to her hiding spot. He helps her by turning on the sprinkler system, causing everyone on the opposing team to run away from guarding the can, letting Michelle run and kick the can to win the game.
6	6	"Ghost in Chains"	Nicole Holofcener	Jay Duplass & Mark Duplass	February 22, 2015	0.367
While in the woods recording sound, Brett meets Linda, a free spirited woman who encourages him to be more spiritual. Michelle joins David at looking at a building for the potential charter school. Michelle agrees to join David on a trip to Sacramento for funding. Tina gives Alex the good news that Larry wants him in a new film that is shooting in New Orleans, but that he needs to audition. They rush to the audition, and when he arrives, he discovers that the part is for the "chubby best friend" and is infuriated at Tina. He instead auditions for the lead role and afterward he tells Tina, "Whatever it is that you and I are doing, it's over." At work, Brett has a nervous breakdown when having to work a 16-hour shift without having a proper meal and leaves. Brett returns to the woods to find Linda where he vents about how he is tired of taking orders from other people.
7	7	"Party Time"	Jay Duplass & Mark Duplass	Jay Duplass & Mark Duplass	March 1, 2015	0.444
Michelle organizes a fundraising party for the charter school, however Brett tells her he won't be attending. Tina and Alex continue to ignore each other due to previous events. Tina is frustrated when she can't set up the bouncy castle for the party herself and Larry tells her that he can take care of her. At the party, Michelle opens up to David about her troubled marriage. Brett arrives at the retreat for spiritual people that Linda invited him to. Brett takes psilocybin mushroom and begins to open up, but eventually begins to freak out. Alex tracks down Brett and brings him back home. Back at home at the party, Brett calmly confronts David about his relationship with Michelle and that he feels threatened by it. Later, inside the house, Brett tells Michelle that "We're not good for each other right now". Michelle agrees that they need some space apart. Alex helps Tina throw away the defective bouncy castle and she breaks down, telling him she's not good at anything. She tells him she accepted Larry's offer of moving in.
8	8	"Not So Together"	Jay Duplass & Mark Duplass	Jay Duplass & Mark Duplass	March 8, 2015	0.326
Tina moves out of Brett and Michelle's house and says goodbye. Alex tells Brett that he's thinking of moving to Detroit. Michelle goes on the road trip to Sacramento with David and two other members of the team. Alex receives exciting news that he got one of the lead roles in Larry's movie. He goes to the hotel she and Larry are staying at to share the good news. When he arrives, he asks to speak to Tina alone and begs her to come to New Orleans with him. She refuses, and Alex tells her that she doesn't love Larry. Tina cries, saying "It's better this way." Alex apologizes and leaves. Brett takes the kids to the beach and truly begins to enjoy himself. David, along with Michelle, pitch the charter school plan to a board at Access Sacramento and are well-received. Brett drives Alex to the airport for his trip to New Orleans, where he tells Alex he feels happy and excited about his life again. Alex tells him to communicate this with Michelle. Brett then drives to Sacramento to see Michelle. At the hotel, David confesses to Michelle about the connection they have. When Michelle is unable to sleep, she passes a note to David under the door, and they begin to send messages back and forth. Eventually, David comes to Michelle's door and they kiss.

=== Season 2 (2016) ===
No. overall	No. in season	Title	Directed by	Written by	Original release date	U.S. viewers (millions)
9	1	"Hotels"	Jay Duplass & Mark Duplass	Jay Duplass & Mark Duplass	February 21, 2016	0.430
Brett, Michelle, Tina, and Larry go to New Orleans to visit Alex for his birthday on the set of the movie. Through flashbacks, it's detailed that Michelle and David had sex. Tina, along with Michelle, shop for a birthday present for Alex, and Tina wants it to be something meaningful. At the store, Michelle confesses to Tina that she had sex with David and that she regrets it. Tina tells her not to tell Brett about it. The four of them go out to dinner with Alex and his new girlfriend. When the others present their expensive gifts to Alex, Tina becomes embarrassed by her gift and pretends she was given the wrong item and goes back and exchanges it for a more expensive one, a giant antique compass that costs $4200. They go to a bar and sing karaoke, where Alex joins Tina in a duet when Larry is busy. Brett takes Michelle for a walk where he tells her how he's really changed. Back at the hotel, Tina asks Alex how about his odd behavior around her, and he tells her "You broke my heart".
10	2	"Everybody Is Grownups"	Jay Duplass & Mark Duplass	Jay Duplass & Mark Duplass	February 28, 2016	0.336
After a charter school meeting, David tells Michelle that he loves her, but Michelle says what they did was a mistake. Brett and Michelle throw a surprise welcome home party for Alex. After originally deciding not to go, Tina shows up. Alex arrives late to the party with his girlfriend, Christy. At the party, Tina and Christy continually use passive-aggressive behavior towards each other, annoying Alex. With the party winding down, Brett and Michelle have sex. Things get more tense when Tina tells Alex and Christy that she'll be sleeping over because she's drunk, and they were already planning on spending the night as well. Tina and Christy begin arguing, causing Alex to eventually break it up. Tina leaves the house, and Alex follows her outside. They begin to argue with each other, Tina tells him "I made you skinny, and then you lost your soul", commenting about his new Hollywood behavior. Alex then calls her life a trainwreck. Tina storms off, and drunkenly drives her vehicle into a tree. She gets out, dazed, and they stare at each other. Michelle, feeling guilty, confesses to Brett that she slept with David, but assures him that it was a mistake. Brett then vomits.
11	3	"Advanced Pretend"	Jay Duplass & Mark Duplass	Jay Duplass & Mark Duplass	March 6, 2016	0.321
Hurt by the news from Michelle, Brett runs away from home. Alex chases him down and he decides to take Brett on an impromptu trip to Detroit, their hometown. Meanwhile, Tina stays at home with Michelle and takes care of the kids, while Michelle sleeps. In Detroit, the guys talk about if they had chosen a different path in life. After going to a bar dressed in 1980s clothing, they run into Kennedy, a girl they once knew. She invites them to a house party. At the party, Brett and Kennedy flirt and she later takes him cycling. When they return, they go into bathroom and make-out, but Brett tells her he's married and runs off. Outside, Brett tells Alex that he was angry that he never returned his calls when he was New Orleans. They reconcile and remember a time capsule that they had buried in Brett's backyard in Detroit. They start digging and wake up Brett's father, and Brett lies that Alex is having trouble and that's why they're in Detroit. They dig up the time capsule finding various items from their childhood and read a note from their younger selves. Brett then receives a text from Michelle, telling him to please come home.
12	4	"Changetown"	Jay Duplass & Mark Duplass	Jay Duplass & Mark Duplass	March 13, 2016	0.264
Brett sleeps over at Alex's house and they talk about their puppet show based on Dune (from their childhood which they found in the time capsule). Tina helps Michelle by taking care of the kids for the day. Michelle meets Brett for coffee where she wants to discuss the future of their marriage, but Brett doesn't want to talk about it. Michelle tells Brett that Sophie is asking why he isn't sleeping at home. Having previously quit his job, Brett tells her he now drives an Uber. She notices that Brett has taken off his wedding ring. At a charter school meeting, Michelle meets Anna, who offers her help with the project. Tina has a trying day with the kids, but eventually begins to truly enjoy it. Alex is annoyed at work when his director tells him he's changing characters. At home, Tina tells Larry she enjoyed her time taking care of the kids, and that she's more open to possibly having children eventually. Larry says, "Everything you said would lead me to believe you would not be a good mom" causing Tina to storm off. Brett and Alex have a night out, where Brett tells him he's not sure what to do about Michelle. When arriving home, Christy is annoyed at Alex for spending time with Brett and ignoring her. Tina sleeps over at Michelle's and finds Brett downstairs as well. She talks to him about what happened with Larry, and Brett tells her she'd be a great mom.
13	5	"Just the Range"	Jay Duplass & Mark Duplass	Jay Duplass & Mark Duplass	March 20, 2016	0.332
Brett and Alex continue working on their Dune puppet show and Alex realizes that Christy has moved out leaving a note breaking up with him. Michelle assures Brett that David is longer working on the charter school project, but Brett doesn't want to hear about him. Michelle is comforted by Anna when she is seen crying in her car. They later together fire their contractor for the project when they believe he's taking advantage by taking too long. At work, Alex learns he has to work with the same director that had fired Brett. The director, Dudley, leaves the set and is manic looking for drugs in Alex's trailer. He confesses to Alex that he knows he's a jerk. Alex helps him out and Dudley pulls out his copy of Dune once seeing Alex's copy in his car. Tina is outraged at Larry when he thinks she's trying to trick him into getting her pregnant, and Larry tells her he definitely doesn't want kids. Tina leaves and calls Alex, but hangs up. After driving a customer home, his electric car dies, and she invites him in. They have a good time together and she tells him he can stay. She walks to the bedroom, and after awhile, Brett follows.
14	6	"Geri-ina"	Jay Duplass & Mark Duplass	Jay Duplass & Mark Duplass	March 27, 2016	0.333
Brett tells Alex about Natalie and how exciting it is. Tina talks with Michelle that she is ready for a relationship and to have kids. Michelle learns that a charter school meeting has been called without her, and instead has been organized by Anna, which frustrates Michelle. After some convincing by Alex, he and Brett meet with Dudley regarding Dune. Tina goes on a date with someone she meet online and it doesn't go well, as they both complain that their profile pictures are misleading. Brett and Alex work on their Dune project with advice from Dudley. Alex gets a call from a producer telling him they want him on the show full-time for $1 million. Brett goes to Natalie's house. Michelle and Tina go to Anna's home for a fundraiser which is full of wealthy people. Michelle wants to know if Anna had sent her an email regarding the previous meeting so she sneaks upstairs and looks at her laptop, discovering she was left off the list. Michelle confronts Anna about how she has taken over her project and Anna tells her that she is the reason the charter school is happening, not her. Anna also admits that she left her off the invite list for the meeting on purpose. Michelle reacts by pushing Anna into her nearby swimming pool.
15	7	"The Sand Situation"	Jay Duplass & Mark Duplass	Jay Duplass & Mark Duplass	April 3, 2016	0.290
Since being kicked out of Alex's apartment, he and Brett store their Dune sets and puppets in the space for the planned charter school. At a meeting held by Michelle, Anna shows up telling everybody she has all the funding to turn it into a dual immersion French school and calls for a vote to change the charter into her name. Anna also tells them she a curriculum while Michelle doesn't. Michelle then tells the group about her planned arts and humanity curriculum and uses the Dune puppets as an example with Brett and Alex's help. Knowing they needs lots of sand for the show, Brett hatches a plan to go the beach in the middle of the night and fill up several barrels with sand. Dudley shows up with several volunteers, which includes Natalie, who happens to be friends with Dudley. While everyone is filling up the barrels, Dudley is on the lookout for any cops. After realizing that they have no ramp to move the barrels onto the truck, they use the swing set to lift the barrels onto the truck. When another cop car is approaching, Dudley is forced to distract them by acting drunk on the street and is arrested. Knowing Tina wants to be in a relationship and get pregnant, Alex protects her from going too fast with a guy she just meet, but this angers her. Back at the school, Michelle sees Brett kissing Natalie as she leaves. After Natalie drives off, Michelle furiously confronts Brett, telling him they're done. At night, Alex goes to Michelle's house to see Tina. He apologizes for his behavior towards her and they agree to be friends.
16	8	"For the Kids"	Jay Duplass & Mark Duplass	Jay Duplass & Mark Duplass	April 10, 2016	0.398
After watching Brett and Alex perform the Dune show, Michelle and Tina realize how awful it is and that they can't perform it for the charter school vote. Tina leaves to go the gynecologist and Alex joins her, so he doesn't have to be around when Michelle tells Brett about how she doesn't like the show. Brett and Michelle then get a call from the hospital saying Sophie has been in an accident. Brett and Michelle rush to the hospital but get stuck in traffic, so they call Alex and Tina to go and see Sophie who has broken both her arms. Brett and Michelle wait at home, and when Tina and Alex arrive with Sophie, she is mad at her parents for not being there. The next day, Michelle figures out that they should turn the play into something educational and interactive. With the help of other parents and children, they revamp the Dune show. At the charter school vote, Michelle wins after their presentation is successful. After, back at home, Brett apologizes to Michelle and asks if he can come back home. They hug and kiss. Back at the school, Alex is helping Tina out of her costume when he kisses her. They then begin to have sex with the hopes of getting pregnant.

== Production ==
In January 2013, HBO ordered the pilot for the series with, Mark Duplass and Jay Duplass writing, directing, and executive producing the series, with Stephanie Langhoff under their Duplass Brothers Productions banner. In March 2013, it was revealed that Amanda Peet, Melanie Lynskey and Steve Zissis joined the cast of the series. In May 2013, it was revealed that Mark Duplass would be starring in the pilot in the lead role. In July 2013, the pilot was picked up to series, with Steve Zissis now joining as a consultant producer and writer. In January 2016, Katie Aselton joined the series in a recurring role. Michael Andrews composed the score for the series.

== Reception ==
=== Critical response ===
The first season received positive reviews from many critics. Review aggregator Rotten Tomatoes gave the first season a 93% approval rating, with an average rating of 8.1 out of 10 based on 43 critic reviews. The critical consensus reads: "Togetherness is a delightful surprise that interweaves day-to-day life with moving, dramatic characters who have an affinity for deprecating, squirmy humor." Metacritic gave the first season a score of 79 based on 23 critic reviews, indicating "generally favorable reviews". IGN reviewer Matt Fowler gave the entire first season an 8.3 out of 10, saying that "The Duplass brothers, along with several wonderful performances, have managed to take an oft-trodden road and paved it fresh."

The second season continued to receive positive reviews from critics. Rotten Tomatoes gave the second season an 88% approval rating, with an average rating of 7.4 out of 10 based on 17 critic reviews. The critical consensus reads: "Togetherness returns with its charm intact, though its compelling characters could stand to have a few more laughs." On Metacritic, it has a score of 73 out of 100 based on 12 reviews, indicating "generally favorable reviews". Alan Sepinwall of HitFix wrote, "The stories are told with such intimacy, such empathy, and such attention to detail, that it transcends labels and generalities" and that the show is "even better this year".

=== Accolades ===
For the 5th Critics' Choice Television Awards, Melanie Lynskey was nominated for Best Supporting Actress in a Comedy Series and Peter Gallagher was nominated for Best Guest Performer in a Comedy Series.

== International broadcast ==
In Canada, the series aired on HBO Canada simultaneously with the American broadcast, and premiered on January 11, 2015. In Australia, the series premiered on April 21, 2015, on Showcase.
