= Mutual Friends (film) =

- Theatrical release poster
- Directed by: Matthew Watts
- Written by: Matthew Watts; Amy Higgins; Frank Angones; Jessica Sue Burstein; Craig DiFolco; Ross Partridge; Olivia Silver
- Produced by: Jennifer Westin; Michael Tannen
- Starring: Caitlin FitzGerald; Cheyenne Jackson; Peter Scanavino
- Cinematography: Leung Ming Kai
- Edited by: Jeff Gilbert
- Music by: Justin Rice; David Lerner
- Production companies: Covert Productions; Firebrand Films; Tannen Media Ventures
- Release dates: May 31, 2013 (Seattle); July 1, 2014
- Running time: 85 minutes
- Country: United States
- Language: English

Mutual Friends is a 2013 American comedy film starring Caitlin FitzGerald, Cheyenne Jackson, Peter Scanavino, Michael Stahl-David, Christina Cole, Jennifer Lafleur, Ross Partridge, Derek Cecil, Michael Chernus, and Vanessa Ray, directed and co-written by Matthew Watts; Amy Higgins, Frank Angones, Jessica Sue Burstein, Craig DiFolco, Ross Partridge and Olivia Silver also co-wrote the film.

It premiered at the 2013 Seattle International Film Festival and was picked up by FilmBuff for distribution. Mutual Friends also played at the Phoenix Film Festival, Raindance Film Festival, Dances with Films, Rhode Island International Film Festival and Sonoma International Film Festival

== Plot ==
Mutual Friends revolves around a birthday party for Christoph (Cheyenne Jackson), planned by Liv (Caitlin FitzGerald) — who is his fiancé — and the people attending the party. Nate (Peter Scanavino), Liv’s good friend who wants to be more than that pops up and wants to revisit an incident between the two of them she’d rather leave behind. Christoph’s ex-girlfriend, Annie (Jennifer LaFleur), is invited to the surprise party, but is not happy he never asked her to marry him. Liv’s ex, Cody (Derek Cecil), also makes an appearance and reminds her why they split. Sammy (Ross Partridge), is a husband (and Liv’s older brother) who discovers his wife is having an affair. Paul (Michael Stahl-David) is married to Beatrice (Christina Cole) and isn’t taking the news about his impending fatherhood well. Though he was given a task, Thomas (Devin Burnam) hangs out with a stripper he’s hired instead of a bartender, buying inappropriate party favors for the party.

== Background ==
Watts reportedly used his relationship with writer/co-producer and wife Amy Higgins as material for the script.

== Cast ==
- Caitlin FitzGerald as Liv
- Cheyenne Jackson as Christoph
- Peter Scanavino as Nate
- Michael Stahl-David as Paul
- Christina Cole as Beatrice
- Jennifer Lafleur as Annie
- Ross Partridge as Sammy
- Devin Burnam as Thomas
- Michael Chernus as Chernus
- Vanessa Ray as Lucy
- Derek Cecil as Cody
