= Larceny (2004 film) =

- Directed by: Irving Schwartz
- Written by: David Bourla; Irving Schwartz
- Produced by: Les Haber; Don Edmonds; Irving Schwartz; Jacov Bresler; Charley Cabrera
- Starring: Joshua Leonard; Andy Dick; Kate Jackson; Heavy D; Roselyn Sanchez; Michael Lerner; Tyra Banks; Priscilla Taylor; Joann Richter
- Cinematography: John P. Tarver
- Edited by: Anil Urmil
- Production company: Larceny Productions
- Distributed by: Empire Pictures Inc.
- Release date: March 2, 2004
- Running time: 100 minutes
- Country: United States
- Language: English

Larceny is a comedy film starring Andy Dick, Joshua Leonard, and Tyra Banks.

== Plot ==
When he leaves New Jersey to go visit his wacky cousin living in Los Angeles, a man has a madcap adventure when he is mistaken for a successful New York artist.

== Cast ==
- Joshua Leonard as Nick
- Andy Dick as Chris
- Kate Jackson as Mom
- Heavy D as Charles
- Roselyn Sánchez as Angela
- Michael Lerner
- Tyra Banks as Self
- Priscilla Inga Taylor (as Priscilla Taylor)
- Joann Richter as Sondra
