= Sarah Adina Smith =

American film writer, director, and editor

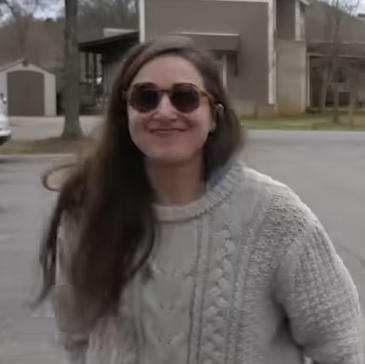
- Smith in 2019
- Born: Fort Collins, Colorado, United States
- Occupations: Director; writer; editor

Sarah Adina Smith is an American film writer, director, and editor. Films she has directed include Buster's Mal Heart (2016), and The Midnight Swim (2014). She also directed two episodes from the television series Room 104. Her films often center around mysticism, spirituality and psychology, and the surreal. Smith also directed several acclaimed television pilots, including Hanna, Looking for Alaska, and Lessons in Chemistry. She won the Directors Guild of America award for Movies for Television and Limited Series for her Lessons in Chemistry episode "Her & Him".

== Early life and education ==
Smith was born in Fort Collins, Colorado. She graduated from Poudre High School in 2001, and studied philosophy at Columbia University in New York. Smith is of Ashkenazi Jewish descent.

== Career ==
Smith's first feature as director, The Midnight Swim, was released in 2014. The film was noted for its shifts in visual style, and won six awards on the festival circuit, including the audience award from AFI Fest.

Her sophomore feature, Buster's Mal Heart, premiered at the 2014 Toronto International Film Festival, and stars Rami Malek, DJ Qualls, and Kate Lyn Sheil.

Smith co-wrote the screenplay for the film Unlovable, which screened at the SXSW festival in 2018.

In 2018 Smith was chosen to direct the first two episodes of television adaptation of the film Hanna. In 2019, she directed one episode of the television adaptation of the novel Looking for Alaska.

She wrote and directed the 2021 film Birds of Paradise and the 2022 film The Drop.

In 2023, Smith directed two episodes of Lessons in Chemistry for Apple TV+. In 2024, she won the Directors Guild of America Award for Outstanding Directorial Achievement in Movies for Television and Limited Series for directing "Her and Him" from Lessons in Chemistry. In June 2024, it was announced that Smith would direct three episodes of the Game of Thrones prequel series A Knight of the Seven Kingdoms. Smith directed the pilot for the 2026 Netflix series Little House on the Prairie.

== Filmography ==
=== Feature film ===
Year	Title	Director	Writer	Producer	Editor
2013	Goodbye World	No	Yes	Yes	No
2014	The Midnight Swim	Yes	Yes	No	Yes
2016	Buster's Mal Heart	Yes	Yes	No	Yes
2021	Birds of Paradise	Yes	Yes	Yes	No
2022	The Drop	Yes	Yes	Yes	Yes

=== Short film ===
Year	Title	Director	Writer	Producer	Editor	Notes
2006	Madura	Yes	Yes	Yes	Yes	
2009	The Sirens	Yes	Yes	No	Yes	
2009	One Cup of Coffee	Yes	No	Yes	Yes	
2016	Mother's Day	Yes	Yes	No	Yes	Segment of Holidays

=== Television ===
Year	Title	Director	Executive producer	Notes
2017	Wrecked	Yes	No	2 episodes
2017	Room 104	Yes	No	2 episodes
2018	Legion	Yes	No	Episode "Chapter 11"
2019	Hanna	Yes	Yes	2 episodes
2019	Looking for Alaska	Yes	Yes	Episode "Famous Last Words"
2023	Lessons in Chemistry	Yes	Yes	2 episodes
2026	A Knight of the Seven Kingdoms	Yes	No	3 episodes
2026	Little House on the Prairie	Yes	No	Pilot
2026	Monster: The Lizzie Borden Story	Yes	No	2 episodes
