= The Do-Deca-Pentathlon =

- Theatrical release poster
- Directed by: Mark Duplass; Jay Duplass
- Written by: Mark Duplass; Jay Duplass
- Produced by: Mark Duplass; Jay Duplass; Stephanie Langhoff
- Starring: Mark Kelly; Steve Zissis; Jennifer Lafleur; Julie Vorus
- Cinematography: Jas Shelton
- Edited by: Jay Deuby; Nat Sanders
- Music by: Julian Wass
- Production company: Duplass Brothers Productions
- Distributed by: Fox Searchlight Pictures; Red Flag Releasing
- Release dates: March 11, 2012 (South by Southwest); July 6, 2012 (United States)
- Running time: 76 minutes
- Country: United States
- Language: English
- Box office: $10,000

The Do-Deca-Pentathlon is a 2012 independent comedy film written and directed by brothers Jay Duplass and Mark Duplass. The film stars Mark Kelly, Steve Zissis, Jennifer Lafleur, and Julie Vorus. The film had its world premiere at SXSW on March 11, 2012. It was released on June 26, 2012, through video on demand, prior to being released in a limited release on July 6, 2012, by Fox Searchlight and Red Flag Releasing.

== Plot ==
The film is about two brothers in their mid-30s (played by Mark Kelly and Steve Zissis) whose lifelong rivalry compels them to secretly complete an athletic competition that they came up with in high school but left unfinished.

== Cast ==
- Mark Kelly as Jeremy
- Steve Zissis as Mark
  - Brendan Robinson as Young Mark
- Jennifer Lafleur as Stephanie
- Julie Vorus as Alice

== Production ==
Production on the film commenced in 2008, in New Orleans.

== Release ==
The film had its world premiere at SXSW on March 11, 2012. It went on to premiere at the San Francisco International Film Festival on April 26, 2012. Shortly after, it was announced that Fox Searchlight Pictures, and Red Flag Releasing had acquired distribution rights to the film. The film was released through video on demand on June 26, 2012, before a limited release on July 6, 2012.

== Critical response ==
As of November 2022, the film holds a 76% approval rating on Rotten Tomatoes, based on 41 reviews with an average rating of 6.3/10. The website's critics consensus reads: "Slight but satisfying, The Do-Deca-Pentathlon wrings fresh laughs from tired man-child comedy tropes." Critic Stephen Holden of The New York Times called it the Duplass brothers' second-best film, after their debut, The Puffy Chair.
