= Steve Zissis =

American actor, writer and producer

- Born: December 17, 1975 (age 50); New Orleans, Louisiana, US
- Occupations: Actor; writer; producer
- Years active: 2002–present

Steve Zissis (Greek: Στηβ Ζήσης; born December 17, 1975) is an American actor, writer and producer. A longtime friend of Jay and Mark Duplass, he has appeared in and co-produced some of their productions, including the films Baghead (2008), Cyrus (2010), The Do-Deca-Pentathlon (2012) and the TV series Togetherness (2015–2016). He has also appeared in other films and TV shows, including the 2013 film Her.

== Early life ==
Zissis was born on December 17, 1975, in New Orleans, Louisiana. He is of Greek descent. He attended the all-male Jesuit High School. Among his schoolmates were Mark Duplass and Jay Duplass; he knew both, although he was better acquainted with Mark, who was a year below him, than Jay, who was three years above him. Zissis was heavily into music and musical theater.

== Career ==
Zissis made his film debut in the short film Climbing Out (2002). He went on to star in The Intervention, a short film directed by Jay Duplass and written by Mark Duplass. Zissis then went on to appear in the short film Momma's Boy. In 2008, Zissis had the leading role in the film Baghead which was written and directed by Mark Duplass and Jay Duplass, which had its world premiere at the Sundance Film Festival on January 22, 2008. At the festival it was acquired by Sony Pictures Classics, and was released on July 13, 2008. That same year, Zissis appeared in the short film Loveolution, and made his television debut in The Office.

In 2009, Zissis appeared in The Overbook Brothers which had its world premiere at South by Southwest. That same year, Zissis appeared in Sunday Morning, The League, and Prototype. In 2010, Zissis appeared in Cyrus. Zissis appeared in two episodes of Parks and Recreation. That same year Zissis wrote, directed, produced and edited the short film Kleshnov. In 2011, Zissis appeared in Jeff, Who Lives at Home, which was written by Mark Duplass and Jay Duplass. The film had its world premiere at the Toronto International Film Festival on September 14, 2011.

In 2012, Zissis starred in the leading role of The Do-Deca-Pentathlon which was also written by Mark and Jay Duplass, who also directed the film, which premiered at South by Southwest in March 2012. The film was released on June 26, 2012, through video on demand prior to a limited release on June 26, 2012. In 2013, Zissis voiced the role of Milo in Bad Milo, which premiered at South by Southwest in March 2013, and was released in August 2013. That same year, he also appeared in Spike Jonze's Her.

Together with the Duplass brothers, Zissis created the HBO TV series Togetherness; Zissis also starred in the series as the best friend of Mark Duplass's character. The series premiered on January 11, 2015, and ran for two seasons.

== Filmography ==
=== Film ===
Year	Title	Role	Notes
2002	Climbing Out	Bryant	Short film
2005	The Intervention	Steve	Short film
2006	Momma's Boy	George	Short film
2008	Baghead	Chad	
2008	Loveolution	Daddy	Short film
2009	The Overbook Brothers	George	
2009	Prototype	Irvin Marquand	
2010	Cyrus	Rusty	
2010	Kleshnov	Kleshnov	Short film Also co-director, co-writer, producer and editor
2011	Jeff, Who Lives at Home	Steve	
2012	The Do-Deca-Pentathlon	Mark	
2013	Bad Milo	Milo (voice)	
2013	Her	New Sweet Boyfriend of Mother Who Dated Pricks	
2016	Another Evil	Dan	
2017	The House	Carl Shackler	
2018	The Front Runner	Tom Fiedler	
2019	Happy Death Day 2U	Dean Bronson	
2020	Bad Hair	Baxter Tannen	
2021	Bliss	Bjorn	
2021	Cruella	—N/a	Story writer
2024	Rebel Ridge	Elliot	
2026	The Cat in the Hat	—N/a	Executive producer alongside Kelly Marcel

=== Television ===
Year	Title	Role	Notes
2008	The Office	Dwight's Ignored Customer (voice)	Episode: "Customer Survey"
2009	Sunday Morning	The Manager	Television film
2009	The League	Craig	Episode: "The Usual Bet"
2009–2010	Parks and Recreation	Gray / Michael	2 episodes
2012	Private Practice	Todd Reiter	Episode: "You Don't Know What You've Got Til It's Gone"
2013	Arrested Development	Chuck The Canadian	Episode: "A New Start"
2014	Trophy Wife	Clerk	Episode: "The Wedding: Part One"
2015–2016	Togetherness	Alex Pappas	Main role, 16 episodes Also co-creator and consultant producer
2016	Animals.	Husband (voice)	Episode: "Rats"
2017	I'm Sorry	Sandy / Shorts Neighbor	Recurring role, 5 episodes
2018	The Guest Book	Mike	Episode: "Two Steps Forward, One Step Back"
2018–2019	Single Parents	Mark Rush	Recurring role, 4 episodes
2020	The Comey Rule	Jim Baker	Main role, 2 episodes
