= The Midnight Swim =

- Theatrical release poster
- Directed by: Sarah Adina Smith
- Written by: Sarah Adina Smith
- Produced by: Mary Pat Bentel; Jonako Donley; Jennifer Lafleur
- Starring: Lindsay Burdge; Jennifer Lafleur; Aleksa Palladino; Beth Grant; Ross Partridge
- Cinematography: Shaheen Seth
- Edited by: Sarah Adina Smith
- Music by: Ellen Reid
- Production company: Friend of a Friend Films
- Distributed by: Candy Factory Films
- Release dates: July 27, 2014 (Fantasia); June 26, 2015 (United States)
- Running time: 84 minutes
- Country: United States
- Language: English

The Midnight Swim is a 2014 POV drama-mystery and the feature film directorial debut of Sarah Adina Smith. The film had its world premiere at the Fantasia International Film Festival on July 27, 2014, and stars Lindsay Burdge, Jennifer Lafleur, and Aleksa Palladino as three half-sisters trying to put their missing mother's affairs in order.

The film was released on June 26, 2015, in a limited release and through video on demand by Candy Factory Films.

== Synopsis ==
When June's (Lindsay Burdge) mother goes mysteriously missing after diving in Spirit Lake, she and her sisters travel home to put her affairs in order. June, a mentally unstable documentary filmmaker, records the experience with her two half-sisters Annie (Jennifer Lafleur) and Isa (Aleksa Palladino). Their mother, an ecologist who was campaigning to preserve Spirit Lake, is gone but always present. As they settle back into her house, Isa takes up with Annie's ex-crush Josh (Ross Partridge) while several strange occurrences happen after they jokingly summon the ghost of a local legend. As the questions mount, the family begins to unravel and June finds herself drawn deeper into the true mystery of the lake.

== Cast ==
- Lindsay Burdge as June
- Jennifer Lafleur as Annie
- Aleksa Palladino as Isa
- Beth Grant as Amelia Brooks
- Ross Partridge as Josh
- Michelle Hutchison as Realtor
- Shirley Venard as Maggie Helms
- Kaya Sakrak as Father
- Traci Dinwiddie as Mother
- Ebru Caparti as Auntie

== Reception ==
Critical reception for The Midnight Swim was positive, with much of the film's praise centering on the performances and the "acutely unsettling" tone of the film. Indiewire praised these elements, calling the film "enigmatic and fathomless," and stating that the film "is, among other things, a movie about sisters, who actually seem like sisters. They look alike, they sound alike, they move alike enough to seem like sibs. One is a believer, one is a cynic; one is, at least on the surface, slightly unstable. They may be variations on a single genetic theme, but even their differences speak to kinship." Twitch Film and Film School Rejects also wrote positive reviews, with Film School Rejects commenting that although they saw the found footage format as a "constant distraction" the film was overall well acted and praised the film's imagery.

Fangoria commented that the found footage format was integral to the story and something more akin to an emotional POV, stating that "the camera uniquely acts as an almost-transparent bridge between you and a character's psyche." Moveable Fest says the movie "terrifies existentially." Ion Cinema states that "the unnerving quality of Sarah Adina Smith's directorial debut occurs mostly in its aftereffects, leaving us with the profound, less earthbound implications in its final few moments."

== Release ==
The film had its world premiere at the Fantasia International Film Festival on July 27, 2014. on May 12, 2015, the film was acquired by Candy Factory Films. The film was released in a limited release and through video on demand on June 26, 2015.
