= Joshua Leonard =

American actor (born 1975)

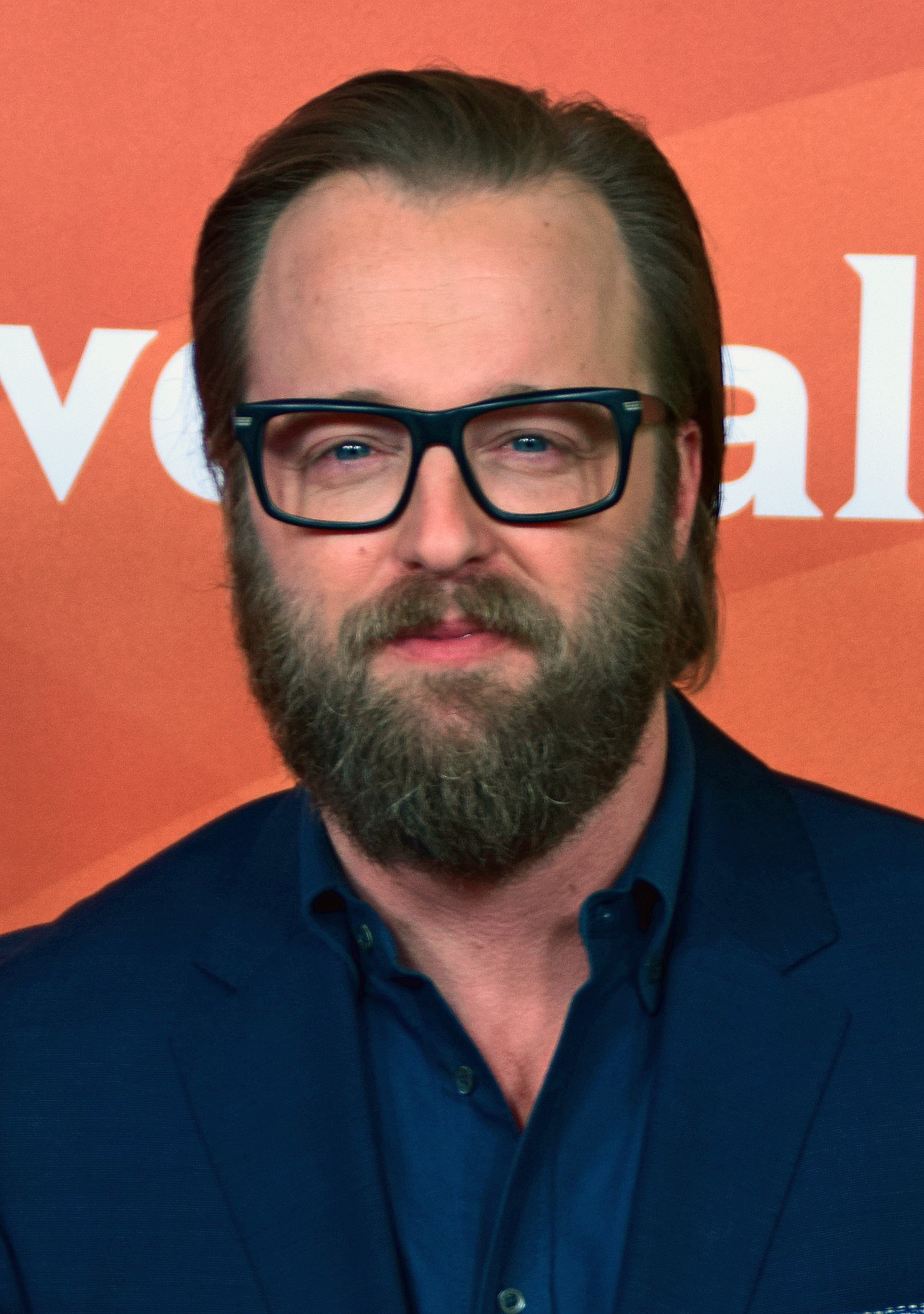
- Leonard in 2016
- Born: Joshua Granville Leonard; June 17, 1975 (age 51); Houston, Texas, U.S.
- Occupations: Actor; writer; director
- Years active: 1999–present
- Spouse: Alison Pill (m. 2015; div. 2025)
- Children: 1

Joshua Granville Leonard (born June 17, 1975) is an American actor, producer, writer, and director, known for his role in The Blair Witch Project (1999). He has since starred in films such as Madhouse (2004), The Shaggy Dog (2006), Higher Ground (2011), The Motel Life (2012), Snake and Mongoose (2013), If I Stay (2014), The Town That Dreaded Sundown (2014), 6 Years (2015), and Unsane (2018).

== Early life ==
Leonard was born in Houston, Texas, the son of Joann, an author, and Robert Leonard, a theater professor at Pennsylvania State University. He was raised in State College, Pennsylvania. Leonard obtained his GED and at age 16 travelled to Chiapas, Mexico, where he taught at an elementary school and volunteered at an anthropological institute. Leonard then spent time in Seattle and London, where he developed an interest in photography, before settling in New York City at age 19.

== Career ==
In 1997, Leonard auditioned for and landed one of the three principal roles in the found footage horror film The Blair Witch Project. Although he reportedly only earned an initial salary of $500, the experience proved rewarding in other ways as the film combined acting and photography. The film premiered at the Sundance Film Festival. Leonard has since appeared in numerous films and television shows as an actor, including HBO's television film Live from Baghdad, the drama film Things Behind the Sun directed by Allison Anders, the comedy film The Shaggy Dog with Tim Allen, the drama film Men of Honor with Robert De Niro and Cuba Gooding, Jr., and the psychological thriller film Bitter Feast with Larry Fessenden.

In 2009, he starred in the Independent Spirit Award-winning film Humpday, for which he won Best Actor at the Gijón International Film Festival. Leonard has also appeared on the acclaimed HBO series Hung and the Showtime series United States of Tara. Leonard directed the short film The Youth in Us, which was shown at the 2005 Sundance Film Festival. Art documentary Beautiful Losers followed, winning the Grand Jury Prize at CineVegas in 2008. He has also directed music videos for many popular acts, such as Morcheeba, Harper Simon, and Fitz and the Tantrums, as well as teaching directing and acting at The New York Film Academy, UC Irvine, and Academia Internacional de Cinema in São Paulo, Brazil. In 2011, Leonard starred in Vera Farmiga's directorial debut drama film Higher Ground, playing a religious man at odds with his wife (Farmiga). He also co-wrote, directed and starred in The Lie, a devilish morality tale adapted from the story by acclaimed author T. C. Boyle. The project co-starred Mark Webber, Jess Weixler, and Jane Adams, and was well received by audiences and critics.

Leonard next appeared alongside Dakota Fanning in The Motel Life (2012). The following year, he starred alongside Carol Kane and Natasha Lyonne in the dark comedy film Clutter, and co-starred in the sports film Snake and Mongoose. In 2014, Leonard co-starred in the drama film If I Stay, directed by R. J. Cutler and based on the novel of the same name by Gayle Forman. Leonard was then cast in the third season of A&E's drama-thriller series Bates Motel as James Finnigan, a psychology professor and a love interest for Norma Louise Bates. In 2015, he had a co-starring role in the romantic drama film 6 Years, directed by Hannah Fidell, which premiered at South by Southwest. In December 2015, it was reported that Marisa Tomei and Timothy Olyphant would star in the Leonard-directed drama film Behold My Heart.

== Personal life ==
In January 2015, Leonard announced his engagement to actress Alison Pill. They were married on May 24, 2015, in Los Angeles. Their daughter was born on November 19, 2016. In 2025, Leonard and Pill divorced.

== Filmography ==
=== Film ===
| Year | Title | Role | Notes |
|---|---|---|---|
| 1999 | The Blair Witch Project | Himself | |
| 1999 | The Blur of Insanity | Staley | |
| 2000 | In the Weeds | Adam | |
| 2000 | Men of Honor | Timothy Douglas Isert | |
| 2001 | Things Behind the Sun | Todd | |
| 2001 | Cubbyhouse | Danny Graham | |
| 2002 | Deuces Wild | "Punchy" | |
| 2003 | Down with the Joneses | Pete Jones | |
| 2003 | Two Days | Bill Buehl | |
| 2003 | Scorched | Rick Becker | |
| 2004 | Madhouse | Clark Stevens | |
| 2004 | Larceny | Nick Peters | |
| 2005 | Shooting Livien | Robby Love | |
| 2005 | A Year and a Day | Malcolm | |
| 2006 | The Death and Life of Bobby Z | Partygoer #1 | |
| 2006 | Hatchet | Ainsley Dunston | |
| 2006 | The Shaggy Dog | Justin Forrester | |
| 2007 | Country Remedy | Darryl | |
| 2008 | Quid Pro Quo | Mr. Knott | |
| 2008 | Prom Night | Bellhop | |
| 2008 | 20 Years After | Michael | |
| 2008 | Expecting Love | Ian Everson | |
| 2009 | Humpday | Andrew | |
| 2010 | Bitter Feast | J.T. Franks | |
| 2010 | The Freebie | Dinner Party Guest | |
| 2011 | Higher Ground | Ethan Miller | |
| 2011 | Shark Night | Robert "Red" Allyjah | |
| 2011 | The Lie | Lonnie | Also writer and director |
| 2012 | The Motel Life | Tommy Locowane | |
| 2013 | Clutter | Charlie Bradford | |
| 2013 | Snake and Mongoose | Thomas Greer | |
| 2014 | Among Ravens | Ellis Conifer | |
| 2014 | If I Stay | Denny Hall | |
| 2014 | The Town That Dreaded Sundown | Deputy Clayborn Foster | |
| 2014 | WildLike | Ted | |
| 2014 | The Ever After | Christian | |
| 2015 | 6 Years | Mark | |
| 2016 | Teenage Cocktail | Tom Fenton | |
| 2018 | Unsane | David Strine | |
| 2018 | Dark Was the Night | | Director and writer |
| 2019 | Depraved | Polidori | |
| 2020 | Four Good Days | Sean | |
| 2020 | Fully Realized Humans | Elliot | Also director, writer, producer and editor |
| 2021 | Bliss | Cameron | |
| 2021 | The Same Storm | Doug Salt | |
| 2022 | The Drop | Joshua | Also co-writer |
| TBA | Two Eyes | Bryce | Post-production |

=== Television ===
| Year | Title | Role | Notes |
|---|---|---|---|
| 2000 | Sacrifice | Jason | Television film |
| 2000 | The Outer Limits | Andy Larouche | Episode: "Gettysburg" |
| 2002 | Live from Baghdad | Mark Biello | Television film |
| 2004 | NYPD Blue | Todd Garvin | Episode: "Divorce, Detective Style" |
| 2004 | CSI: NY | Matt Paulson | Episode: "A Man a Mile" |
| 2005 | CSI: Miami | Jim Markham | 3 episodes |
| 2006 | Numbers | Roy Mitchell | Episode: "Guns and Roses" |
| 2006 | Bones | Nate Gibbons | Episode: "The Headless Witch in the Woods" |
| 2009 | Hung | Pierce | 3 episodes |
| 2010 | United States of Tara | Ricky | Episode: "The Truth Hurts" |
| 2011 | Criminal Minds | Lyle Donaldson | Episode: "Today I Do" |
| 2012 | The Finder | Derek Towers | Episode: "The Great Escape" |
| 2012 | The Producer | Mike Cabot | Unsold pilot |
| 2012 | Touch | King Roadie | Episode: "Kite Strings" |
| 2012–13 | The Mob Doctor | Scott Parker | 2 episodes |
| 2014 | True Detective | Mitch | Episode: "Who Goes There" |
| 2014, 2016–17 | Scorpion | Mark Collins | 6 episodes |
| 2015 | Down Dog | Young Jimmy Wood | Television film |
| 2015–16 | Togetherness | Dudley | 6 episodes |
| 2015 | Bates Motel | James Finnigan | 6 episodes |
| 2016 | Heartbeat | Max Elliot | 7 episodes |
| 2017 | Startup | Rance | Recurring role |
| 2020 | MacGyver | Martin Bishop | Episode: "Fire + Ashes + Legacy = Phoenix" |
| 2025 | Law & Order: Special Victims Unit | Greg Morrison | Episode: Showdown |
| TBA | Tattered Hearts | | Television film |

=== Video game ===
| Year | Title | Role | Notes |
|---|---|---|---|
| 2004 | Fight Club | Tyler Durden | Replacing Brad Pitt |

== Awards and nominations ==
| Year | Award | Category | Work | Result |
|---|---|---|---|---|
| 2000 | Fangoria Chainsaw Awards | Best Supporting Actor | The Blair Witch Project | Nominated |
| 2000 | Blockbuster Entertainment Awards | Favorite Actor - Newcomer | The Blair Witch Project | Nominated |
| 2005 | Independent Film Festival of Boston | Short Film: Narrative | The Youth in Us | Won |
| 2005 | Palm Springs International ShortFest | Best Live Action Under 15 Minutes | The Youth in Us | Won |
| 2009 | Gijón International Film Festival | Best Actor | Humpday | Won |
| 2010 | Fangoria Chainsaw Awards | Best Supporting Actor | Bitter Feast | Nominated |
| 2011 | Asheville Cinema Festival | Best Narrative Feature Film | The Lie | Won |
| 2011 | Sundance Film Festival | Best of Next! | The Lie | Nominated |
| 2012 | VC FilmFest - Los Angeles Asian Pacific Film Festival | Best Ensemble Acting - Narrative Feature | Sunset Stories | Won |
| 2018 | Transatlantyk Festival: Lodz | Section "New Cinema" | Behold My Heart | Nominated |
| 2018 | Fangoria Chainsaw Awards | Best Supporting Actor | Unsane | Nominated |
| 2020 | Tribeca Film Festival | Best Narrative Feature | Fully Realized Humans | Nominated |
| 2020 | Florida Film Festival | Best Narrative Feature | Fully Realized Humans | Nominated |
