= The Lie (2011 film) =

- Theatrical release poster
- Directed by: Joshua Leonard
- Written by: Joshua Leonard; Jess Weixler; Mark Webber; Jeff Feuerzeig
- Based on: "The Lie" by T. Coraghessan Boyle
- Produced by: Mary Pat Bentel
- Starring: Joshua Leonard; Jess Weixler; Mark Webber; Kelli Garner; Jane Adams; Alia Shawkat; Gerry Bednob; Holly Woodlawn; Kirk Baltz; Tipper Newton; Violet Long
- Cinematography: Benjamin Kasulke
- Edited by: Greg O'Bryant
- Music by: Peter Raeburn
- Production companies: Perception Media; Das Films
- Distributed by: Screen Media Films
- Release dates: January 25, 2011 (Sundance); November 18, 2011 (United States)
- Running time: 80 minutes
- Country: United States
- Language: English

The Lie is a 2011 American drama-comedy film, directed by Joshua Leonard, from a screenplay by Leonard, Jess Weixler, Mark Webber, and Jeff Feuerzeig. It is based upon a short story of the same name by T. Coraghessan Boyle that was printed in The New Yorker. It stars Leonard, Weixler, Webber, Kelli Garner, Jane Adams, Alia Shawkat, Gerry Bednob, Holly Woodlawn, Kirk Baltz, Tipper Newton and Violet Long.

It had its world premiere at the Sundance Film Festival on January 25, 2011. It was given a limited release on November 18, 2011, by Screen Media Films.

== Plot ==
Lonnie and Clover are a young married couple with a baby daughter, Xana. The unplanned baby meant the couple had to abandon their early notions of idealism and make compromises for economic security. Clover, a former activist, has landed herself a cushy job in the corporate world. Lonnie, who has put his interest in music on hold for a job at a film production house, feels his dreams are behind him and starts seeing a therapist for depression. One day, to get out of work, he calls in sick, but his abusive boss demands he show up or he will be fired. Lonnie panics and tells a shocking lie to justify his absence. Once the lie is out, there's no going back for Lonnie. The lie pushes Lonnie to figure out who he is, what he wants, and what it means to be a father.

== Cast ==
- Joshua Leonard as Lonnie
- Jess Weixler as Clover
- Mark Webber as Tank
- Kelli Garner as Brianna
- Jane Adams as Dr. Bentel
- Alia Shawkat as Seven
- Gerry Bednob as Radko
- Holly Woodlawn as Cherry
- Kirk Baltz as Joel
- Tipper Newton as Jeannie
- Violet Long as Xana
- James Ransone as Weasel
- Matthew Newton as Steve
- Allison Anders as Allison
- Lola Blanc as Green-Eyed Girl
- Michael McColl as Ted
- Gwyn Fawcett as Mary
- Germaine Mozel Sims as Diner

== Production ==
Joshua Leonard had been on the lookout for a story to be made into a movie, when he read the short story "The Lie", which was in the April 14, 2008 issue of The New Yorker. He realized that the story was a good fit for an independent film that could be made in Los Angeles, using collaborators he already knew in the area. The original short story was sixteen pages long.

The crew spent two and a half weeks shooting the film, and six months editing it. For baby Xana, the filmmakers cast Violet Long (an infant at that time), whose parents are Daniel (the film's co-producer) and Darby Long.

== Release ==
The film had its world premiere at the Sundance Film Festival on January 25, 2011. Shortly after, Screen Media Films acquired distribution rights to the film. It was released on November 18, 2011.

== Critical response ==
On review aggregate website Rotten Tomatoes, The Lie has an approval rating of 74% based on 19 reviews. On Metacritic, the film has a score of 59 out of 100 based on 12 reviews, indicating "mixed or average reviews".

Anthony Breznican of Entertainment Weekly said "[T]his ultra-low-budget dark-comedy also may be one of the upcoming Sundance Film Festival's most touching family dramas." In The New York Times, Jeannette Catsoulis commented the film is "beautifully acted and emotionally resonant -- in the film's best scene, Clover's face silently telegraphs the dawning realization that Lonnie's hideous new song is really a terrible confession -- The Lie is about adjusting one's self-portrait to accommodate changing realities." Roger Ebert awarded the film 3 out of 4 stars, saying, "It's easy to imagine this movie going wrong: Pumping up the drama, punching the big developments, using the wrong music. It keeps its cool. One test of a new director is how he handles a scene that has cliche written all over it. In The Lie, Lonnie, Clover and baby Xana go on a weekend camping trip, and we see they truly do make up a family, and Leonard does this in a convincing and affectionate way."

Mark Olsen of The Los Angeles Times wrote, "Though the scenes for The Lie have a preconceived shape and direction, there are only spare snippets of specific dialogue written, in the hope that the tightrope walk of the creative moment will help capture some real-life spark."
