= Baghead =

- Theatrical release poster
- Directed by: Jay Duplass; Mark Duplass
- Written by: Jay Duplass; Mark Duplass
- Produced by: Mark Duplass; Jay Duplass; John E. Bryant
- Starring: Ross Partridge; Steve Zissis; Greta Gerwig; Elise Muller
- Cinematography: Jay Duplass
- Edited by: Jay Deuby
- Music by: J. Scott Howard
- Production company: Duplass Brothers Productions
- Distributed by: Sony Pictures Classics
- Release dates: January 22, 2008 (Sundance Film Festival); June 13, 2008 (United States)
- Running time: 84 minutes
- Country: United States
- Language: English
- Box office: $140,106

Baghead is a 2008 mumblecore comedy horror film written and directed by Jay and Mark Duplass. The film stars Ross Partridge, Elise Muller, Greta Gerwig, and Steve Zissis. The film had its world premiere at the Sundance Film Festival on January 22, 2008. The film was given a limited release by Sony Pictures Classics on July 13, 2008.

== Plot ==
Four actors – Matt (Ross Partridge), Catherine (Elise Muller), Michelle (Greta Gerwig), and Chad (Steve Zissis) – attend an art festival and watch a low-budget movie directed by Jett (Jett Garner). After the showing, Jett explains to them that he kept the budget so low by not telling his actors they were in a movie until the final piece was ready. The group then goes to an after party; however, Matt is unable to gain entry into the club after not wanting to appear desperate by asking his old friend Jett to get him in. The four actors go to a different bar, where they decide to go to Chad's isolated cabin in the woods to write their own movie to star in, since they were fed up having only been cast as extras.

After arriving at the cabin, Michelle gets drunk and decides to go to bed, whereupon Chad hits on her, although she rejects his advances, telling him he is like a brother. Later, Michelle rushes outside of the cabin to vomit, where she encounters a man with a bag over his head. The next morning, Michelle believes this to have been a dream and decides to tell the others in the hopes of creating a horror movie based around the character 'baghead'. At night, the group gathers to brainstorm ideas. Michelle writes several notes to Matt to meet her in her room, before she goes to bed. While in her room, a figure wearing a bag over the head enters. At first, Michelle believes it to be Matt, but she becomes increasingly uncomfortable before the figure eventually leaves. Upset, Michelle confronts Matt, who denies it was him, leading the pair to believe it was perhaps instead Catherine trying to scare Michelle, because she is jealous of her connection with Matt. Catherine also denies the accusations and angrily leaves the cabin to smoke a cigarette, while Matt convinces Michelle to stay at the cabin.

The following morning, Chad wakes up Matt and Michelle and says he cannot find Catherine. Chad then quickly learns of Michelle's advances on Matt, and upset he too leaves the cabins, only for his screams to be heard minutes later. Matt and Michelle find his ripped t-shirt in the woods, but believe it to be a prank and so go back to the cabin. Michelle again advances on Matt, but feeling bad for Chad, Matt goes upstairs where he is attacked by figures wearing bags over their heads, revealed to be Chad and Catherine getting revenge for the romance between Matt and Michelle. Later, as night falls, the group hangs out before Matt and Chad see a figure through the window. The group investigates outside and finds their car has been disabled before apparently encountering the actual "baghead" figure. Matt and Chad attempt to attack him, but upon seeing he has a knife, the members of the group flee into the cabin, and they barricade themselves in until morning.

The following day, the group decides to hike the 11 miles (18 km) to the nearest freeway. After hours of walking, the group becomes lost in the woods before stumbling upon an abandoned car. As Chad is about to break a window to get in, "baghead" appears and chases the group through the woods. Matt is caught and stabbed to death in front of the others. Catherine and Michelle reach the freeway and attempt to flag down a car, but it continues to drive on past them. Chad emerges from the woods further up the road and is subsequently hit by the car as it swerves to miss the girls. Catherine and Michelle help the unconscious Chad into the truck before Matt emerges from the woods uninjured and "baghead" is revealed to be Jett.

Sometime later at the hospital, Chad awakens distraught over Matt's death. Catherine and Michelle explain to him that Matt and Jett orchestrated the whole thing and had been secretly filming them to create a movie. Chad demands to see Matt and asks him to see the footage. After watching, Chad tells Matt that they should edit it down and take it to a film festival, as he believes it will be a success.

== Cast ==
- Ross Partridge as Matt
- Elise Muller as Catherine
- Greta Gerwig as Michelle
- Steve Zissis as Chad
- Jett Garner as Jett

== Release ==
The film had its world premiere at the Sundance Film Festival on January 22, 2008. Shortly after it was announced Sony Pictures Classics had acquired distribution rights to the film for "under $1 million", beating out studios such as Picturehouse, IFC Films, Netflix and Samuel Goldwyn Films. The film went on to premiere at SXSW on March 9, 2008. and the Tribeca Film Festival on April 26, 2008. The film was released in a limited release in the United States on June 13, 2008. The film had its Latin American premiere at the Mar del Plata Film Festival on November 6, 2008. and the European Premiere at the Hamburg Film Festival in September 2009.

== Reception ==
On review aggregator website Rotten Tomatoes the film holds a 79% approval rating, based on 99 reviews with an average rating of 6.6/10. The site's consensus reads, "Pitting actors against murderers in a self-aware struggle for stardom, Baghead successfully skates the borders of horror and comedy." On Metacritic, Baghead has a rank of 62 out of a 100 based on 23 critics, indicating "generally favorable" reviews.

Todd Gilchrist of IGN, while attending Los Angeles Film Festival in 2008, wrote: "Mumblecore makes its first horror film with this indie opus". Dana Stevens of Slate magazine compared the film to early works by John Sayles and Eric Rohmer. The Village Voice's Robert Wilonsky, said that "[the film] better in its first half, when it pokes gentle fun at the film festival circuit where Baghead [has] been stretching its legs since its debut at Sundance in January".

The DVD release of the film got a score of 8 out of 10 by Christopher Monfette of IGN who called the film "A first-rate horror/comedy mash-up" and "[a] scary, charming, funny, frightening must-scene indie flick".

== See also ==
- Mumblecore
- Mumblegore
