= Feed the Fish =

- Directed by: Michael Matzdorff
- Written by: Michael Matzdorff
- Produced by: Alison Anne Abrohams; Nicholas Owen Langholff; Michael Matzdorff; Troy Allen Dyer
- Starring: Tony Shalhoub; Ross Partridge; Katie Aselton
- Cinematography: Steven Parker
- Edited by: Ross Albert; Michael Matzdorff
- Music by: T.D. Lind
- Production company: Triplefinger
- Distributed by: Strand Releasing
- Release date: April 16, 2010 (Wisconsin Film Festival)
- Running time: 92 minutes
- Country: United States
- Language: English

Feed the Fish is a 2010 American independent comedy film written and directed by Michael Matzdorff and starring Tony Shalhoub, Ross Partridge and Katie Aselton. It is Matzdorff's directorial debut.

== Plot ==
The film follows Joe Peterson, a children's book author from California, who travels to Ellison Bay, Wisconsin with his friend J.P. to find inspiration for the belated follow up to his popular book, "Mr. Kitty Feeds the Fish." While there he befriends Axel Anderson and eventually falls for his granddaughter, Sif, much to the dismay of her father, the town's Sheriff.

== Cast ==
- Ross Partridge as Joe Peterson
- Tony Shalhoub as Sheriff Andersen
- Barry Corbin as Axel Andersen
- Katie Aselton as Sif Andersen
- Michael Chernus as J.P.
- Vanessa Branch as Lorraine
- Patrick Cavanaugh as Hamish the Paramedic
- Michael Shalhoub as Dr. Koosa
- Susan Shalhoub Larkin as Nurse H. Josephs

== Production ==
The film was shot in Door County, Wisconsin.

== Reception ==
Linda Cook of the Quad-City Times gave a positive review of the film, describing it as "a perfectly warm winter outing." Chris Foran of the Milwaukee Journal Sentinel awarded the film two stars.

== See also ==
- Independent film
- Film industry in Wisconsin
