= Ross Partridge =

American actor

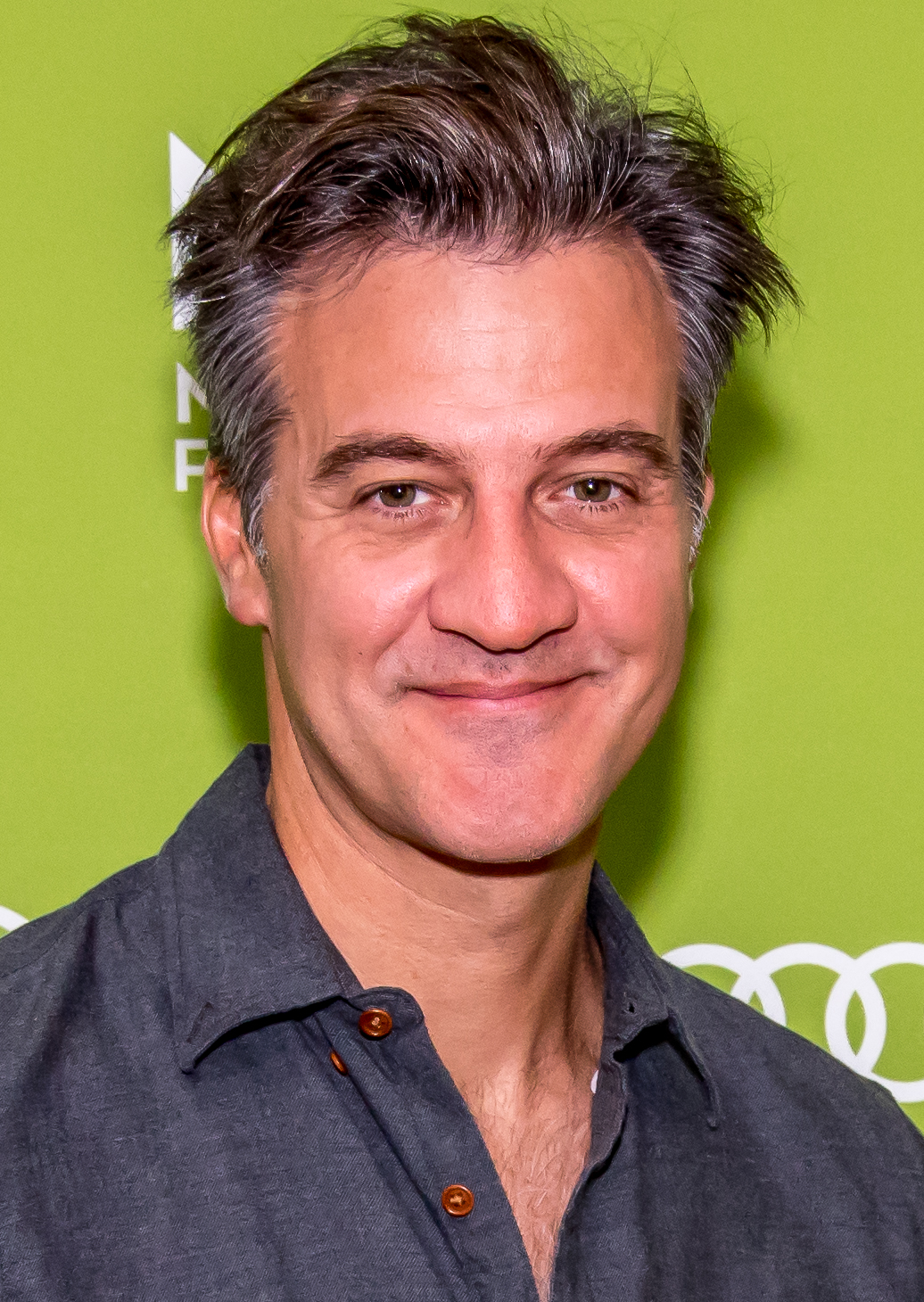
- Partridge at the Montclair Film Festival, May 2015
- Born: Ross Whitman Partridge; February 26, 1968 (age 58); Kingston, New York, U.S.
- Education: University of California, Santa Cruz (BA)
- Occupations: Actor, producer, screenwriter, director
- Years active: 1991–present
- Spouse: Jennifer Lafleur (m. 2016)
- Children: 1

Ross Partridge (born February 26, 1968) is an American actor, director, screenwriter and producer.

His most notable work as a director is the 2015 adaptation of the book Lamb, which Partridge wrote, starred in and directed. As an actor, he has had recurring roles in the critically acclaimed Netflix series Stranger Things, the Showtime series Billions, and the HBO series Insecure. He is the co-executive producer of Room 104 and has also directed three episodes ("Phoenix", "FOMO", and "Mr. Mulvahill"), written two episodes, and starred in one episode of the series.

== Personal life ==
Partridge is a native of Kingston, New York, and attended the University of California, Santa Cruz after high school. In May 2016, Partridge married actress Jennifer Lafleur after 10 years of dating.

In fall 2025, he went back to University of California, Santa Cruz to finish getting his degree and in June 2026, Partridge received his Bachelor of Arts after completing the final course he needed to get his degree.

== Filmography ==
Year	Title	Role	Notes and references
1991	The Flash	Wiseguy	Episode: "Alpha"
1992	Kuffs	Robert	
1992	Quantum Leap	Mirror Image of Max Greenman	Episode: "It's a Wonderful Leap"
1992	In Living Color		Episode: "Homey and Son"
1993	Amityville: A New Generation	Keyes Terry	
1996	Diagnosis: Murder	Eric Temple	Episode: "The Pressure to Murder"
1996	Maybe This Time	David	Episode: "Whose Life Is It Anyway?"
1996	Hudson Street	Eduardo	Episode: "One for the Monet"
1997	The Lost World: Jurassic Park	Curious Man	
1998	The Net	Rusty Olsen	Episode: "Jump Vector"
1999	Black and White	Michael Clemence	
1999	The Kiss	Actor	
2001	Law & Order	Gibson	Episode: "Bronx Cheer"
2004	CSI: Crime Scene Investigation	Ed Burnell	Episode: "Getting Off"
2004	NYPD Blue	Parks Benton	Episode: "Divorce, Detective Style"
2007	As the World Turns	Milo Shaughnessy	4 episodes
2008	Baghead	Matt	
2008	Prom Night	Businessman	
2009	Feed the Fish	Joe Peterson	
2010	Christopher Dispossessed	Chris	
2010	The Freebie	Bartender	
2010	The Lake Effect	Rob	
2011	Low Fidelity	Brandon	
2011	The Off Hours	Oliver	
2011	Treatment	Gregg D	
2011	How to Make It in America	Steve	3 episodes
2012	Siren	Carl	
2012	The Playback Singer	Ray Tomassi	
2013	Mutual Friends	Sammy	
2013	Cold Turkey	TJ	
2013	Siren	Carl	
2013	Doubt	Peter Brown	TV movie
2014	The Midnight Swim	Josh	
2015	The Mentalist	Steven Korbell	Episode: "Green Light"
2015	Lamb	David Lamb	Also director, screenwriter
2015	Hangman		
2015	Battle Creek	Dr. Derek Henderson	Episode: "The Hand-Off"
2015	The Middle Distance	Neil	
2015	Secret in Their Eyes	Ellis	
2016	The Wedding Murders	Prospect Jenkins	
2016	The White King	Peter	
2016	Stranger Things	Lonnie Byers	Season 1
2016	Six LA Love Stories	Wes Ellis	
2016	Buster's Mal Heart	Psychic Caller	Voice
2017	Billions	Tom McKinnon	3 episodes
2017	Room 104	Bradley	1 episode as actor, 24 episodes as co-executive producer
2017	The Glass Castle	Cab Driver	
2017	Insecure	Johnson	2 episodes
2017	6 Dynamic Laws for Success	Milton Montgomery	
2018	9-1-1	Daniel Cooper	Episode: "Next of Kin"
2018	Casual	Michael	Episode: "Finale"
2018	Ballers	Sean	Episode: "Doink"
2018	Blindspot	Colonel Beck	Episode: "Sous-Vide"
2019	Stray	Jake	
2019	Broker	Matt	TV film
2019	Ravage	Sheriff Pendergras / Whipping Boy	
2019	The Marcus Garvey Story	Leo Healy	
2019	Less Than Zero	Owen	TV movie
2020	Omniboat: A Fast Boat Fantasia		
2020	The Evening Hour	Randy	
2020	The High Note	Bennett	
2020	Fully Realized Humans	Barry	
2021	Phobias	Dr. Wright	
2021	Don't Look Up	Keith Ollens	
2022	The Rookie	Levi Lincoln	Episode: "Heart Beat"
2022	The Blacklist	Reggie Cole	2 episodes
2022	The Drop	Special Officer Seth Smith	
2023	Daisy Jones & the Six	Don Midleton	4 episodes
2026	Ted	David Robichek	Episode Mrs. Robichek
2026	Law & Order: Special Victims Unit	Robbie Miller	Episode: "Corrosive"
