= Jeff, Who Lives at Home =

2011 film by Jay Duplass, Mark Duplass

- Theatrical release poster
- Directed by: Jay Duplass; Mark Duplass
- Written by: Jay Duplass; Mark Duplass
- Produced by: Lianne Halfon; Russell Smith; Jason Reitman
- Starring: Jason Segel; Ed Helms; Judy Greer; Susan Sarandon
- Cinematography: Jas Shelton
- Edited by: Jay Deuby
- Music by: Michael Andrews
- Production companies: Paramount Vantage; Indian Paintbrush; Right of Way Films; Mr. Mudd
- Distributed by: Paramount Pictures
- Release dates: September 14, 2011 (TIFF); March 16, 2012 (United States)
- Running time: 83 minutes
- Country: United States
- Language: English
- Budget: $7.5 million
- Box office: $4.7 million

Jeff, Who Lives at Home is a 2011 American comedy-drama film written and directed by Jay and Mark Duplass, starring Jason Segel and Ed Helms, and co-starring Judy Greer and Susan Sarandon. The film premiered on September 14, 2011, at the 2011 Toronto International Film Festival and then saw a limited release in the United States and Canada on March 16, 2012, after having been pushed back from the original date of March 2. The film received praise for its humor, but grossed only $4.7 million worldwide against a $7.5 million budget.

== Plot ==
Jeff is a 30-year-old unemployed stoner living in his mother Sharon's basement in Baton Rouge, Louisiana. He looks for his destiny in seemingly random occurrences. Finding inspiration in the film Signs reinforces his belief in this.

One day, he answers the telephone; the wrong number is for somebody called "Kevin", and Jeff contemplates its meaning, deciding it is a sign. Getting a call from his irritated mother asking him to buy wood glue to fix a door shutter or find a new place to live, Jeff boards a bus. There, he sees a kid wearing a sports jersey bearing the name Kevin. He follows him to a basketball court, where he joins a pick-up game, and they bond. Jeff agrees to smoke weed with Kevin, but is tricked, beaten, and mugged.

Coming upon a Hooters restaurant, Jeff comes across his older brother Pat, a successful yuppie struggling with his marriage. Pat's wife Linda is spotted across the street with another man. Jeff and Pat spend several hours following them, first to a restaurant and later to a hotel, with Pat's new Porsche being ticketed, crashed, and eventually towed away at various points on the journey. The brothers also visit their father's gravesite and fight over their conflicting life philosophies.

Seeing a truck reading "Kevin Kandy", Jeff runs off to hitch a ride, ending up at the same hotel where Pat has found Linda in a room with another man. Jeff offers to break down the door. The man is her co-worker, Steve. Linda quickly ushers Steve out and then confronts Pat about his role in their problems. Frustrated, she leaves, saying she is going to live with her mother. Jeff and Pat reconcile; Jeff explains how he is struggling to find his destiny, while Pat admits he wants him and Linda to fall in love again. Jeff encourages him to tell her, and they hail a taxi to pursue her.

Interspersed within the main story is the story of Sharon, who is at work, frustrated with her unfulfilled life, and dissatisfied with her sons. The doldrum is interrupted when a paper airplane with a drawing of a flower lands in her cubicle, followed by an anonymous co-worker claiming in an instant message to be a secret admirer. Sharon spends the day trying to deduce their identity. Confiding her frustrations to colleague and friend Carol, she reveals that she has not dated since her husband's death.

Carol encourages her to warm up to the attention she is receiving. Sharon is surprised and confused when the admirer turns out to be Carol herself, and though neither believe themselves to be attracted to their own gender, Carol appeals to Sharon's desire to become close with someone who truly understands her. At that moment, a fire alarm goes off and ceiling sprinklers activate; this is an enlightening moment for Sharon who sets off with Carol on an impulsive trip to New Orleans.

Jeff, Pat, Linda, Sharon, and Carol converge on a bridge, getting stuck in standstill traffic. Pat exits the taxi and runs through the cars to tell Linda how he feels, passing Carol's car; Sharon sees and runs after him, followed by Carol. As Jeff muses to the cab driver about how seeking his destiny is not very exciting, he sees a helicopter flying overhead. He jumps out of the taxi and also runs through the cars, passing Pat, who was sharing his feelings with Linda when Sharon and Carol arrive.

Jeff continues running, seeing the cause of the traffic is an accident in which a car plummeted over the side of the bridge. He dives into the water, rescuing two children and their father; when Jeff then fails to resurface Pat dives in and rescues him. The group reconciles after the ordeal: Sharon celebrates her birthday and Pat and Linda appearing to fare better in their marriage. Jeff sees a news report about his heroics, and learns that the father of the kids he rescued was also named Kevin; now with a sense of purpose, he grabs some wood glue and fixes the shutter.

== Cast ==
- Jason Segel as Jeff Thompkins
- Ed Helms as Pat Thompkins
- Susan Sarandon as Sharon Thompkins
- Judy Greer as Linda Thompkins
- Rae Dawn Chong as Carol
- Steve Zissis as Steve
- Evan Ross as Kevin

== Release ==
The film grossed $840,000 in its opening weekend.

Jeff, Who Lives at Home grossed $4,269,426 in North America and $435,331 elsewhere, for a worldwide total of $4,704,757.

== Reception ==
On Rotten Tomatoes, the film has an approval rating of 77% based on 141 reviews, with an average rating of 6.77/10. The site's critical consensus reads, "Sweet, funny, and flawed, Jeff, Who Lives at Home finds the Duplass brothers moving into the mainstream with their signature quirky charm intact". On Metacritic, the film has a normalized score of 60 out of 100, based on 36 critics, indicating "mixed or average" reviews.

Roger Ebert of the Chicago Sun-Times gave the film three stars out of four and described it as:

a whimsical comedy [that depends] on the warmth of Segel and Sarandon, the discontent of Helms and Greer, and still more warmth that enters at midpoint with Carol (Rae Dawn Chong), Sarandon's co-worker at the office.... it's not a Feel Good Movie, more of a Feel Sorta Good Movie.

Peter Travers of Rolling Stone also gave the film three stars out of four and described it as "funny, touching, and vital", praising the Duplass brothers by saying that "their films hit you where you live."

== Home media ==
Jeff, Who Lives at Home was released on DVD and Blu-ray on June 19, 2012.
