= Goodbye World =

2013 film by Denis Henry Hennelly

- Theatrical release poster
- Directed by: Denis Henry Hennelly
- Written by: Sarah Adina Smith; Denis Henry Hennelly
- Produced by: Mary Pat Bentel; Denis Henry Hennelly; Albertino Matalon; Guy Moshe; Sarah Adina Smith; Matthew G. Zamias
- Starring: Kerry Bishé; Caroline Dhavernas; Adrian Grenier; Gaby Hoffmann; Ben McKenzie; Scott Mescudi; Mark Webber
- Cinematography: Jeff Bollman
- Edited by: Greg O'Bryant
- Music by: Eric D. Johnson
- Production companies: Gather Films; Picturesque Films
- Distributed by: Samuel Goldwyn Films; Phase 4 Films
- Release dates: June 15, 2013 (LA Film Festival); April 4, 2014 (USA)
- Running time: 100 minutes
- Country: United States
- Language: English

Goodbye World is a 2013 American apocalyptic comedy drama film directed, co-written and co-produced by Denis Henry Hennelly. It stars Kerry Bishé, Caroline Dhavernas, Adrian Grenier, Gaby Hoffmann, Ben McKenzie, Scott Mescudi, Mark Webber, and Mckenna Grace (in her film debut). It follows a group of friends who gather at a compound in the woods north of San Francisco while the world is collapsing all around them.

The film had its world premiere at the LA Film Festival on June 15, 2013. It was released in a limited release and through video on demand on April 4, 2014, by Samuel Goldwyn Films and Phase 4 Films.

== Plot ==
The film begins with James' recitation of a Henry David Thoreau quote, after which he states that he saw the oncoming societal collapse and moved his free-spirited wife Lily and young daughter Hannah off the grid. A montage shows his college friends just before the collapse: Benji, a radical activist, lectures at a college and has sex with Ariel, one of the students; Nick, James' former business partner, and his wife Becky are en route to James' house for a meeting; Laura, formerly a senator's aide, is rejected from a job at a non-profit due to a past public sex scandal; and Lev, a computer hacker, prepares to commit suicide until he hears that a computer virus may be responsible for the collapse. They, and others, receive a "Goodbye World" text at the same time. The friends converge at Lily and James' remote Mendocino County off-grid home, where Benji explains that violent riots have broken out across the nation.

When Laura and James ride into town, he asks if she was forewarned of the attacks. Although she initially denies it, she admits that Homeland Security contacted her about Lev, whom they suspected to be involved with the virus. In town, bikers have taken over the local store and gouge the locals. Laura flashes her breasts for supplies, and they quickly leave when they see a local man bullied mercilessly by thugs. Two National Guardsmen visit the house and request its use as their base of operations. Becky objects on Constitutional grounds, and James asks them to leave.

Laura decodes a repeated presidential message on television, revealing that the United States is now under martial law. At the same time, old rivalries flare up, and the friends begin fighting over unresolved issues from the past. Becky, who never felt accepted by the others, argues with them over her libertarian political beliefs, and James and Nick argue over an old business-related lawsuit.

The infighting intensifies, and Benji tells a disruptive Ariel to leave, but James invites her to stay. When Ariel attacks Lily, she overrides James and tells Ariel to leave. At the same time, Nick and Lily explore their feelings for each other, and Lily demands a divorce from James, who responds that he has more important things to worry about than his marriage. Ariel goes to live with James' neighbors, who have taken in the Guardsmen, and tells them of James' food and medicine supplies. Damon, the nastier of the Guardsmen, demands that James give them all the supplies. When he resists, Damon violently gropes Laura and threaten to kill Lev. They leave after James promises to deliver them tomorrow.

Lev reveals that he was partially responsible for the computer virus; he was hired to construct a text message cell phone virus that could overload an entire nation's grid, which he found an interesting challenge. When he later attempted suicide, he used his virus to send a "Goodbye World" text to the entire country, not knowing that Lily had playfully hacked into his computer, inadvertently releasing the virus' full source code into the wild, destroying the country's – and possibly the world's – technological infrastructure.

Becky finds Benji in the woods, stuck in a bear trap. She gets him out, and the two bond, leading him to tell her about Nick and Lily. When Becky confronts them, Nick and Lily briefly leave together, but they return when Lily convinces Nick that they should be friends and not lovers.

James visits his growing group of neighbors and refuses to hand over his supplies, though he naively offers to consider any requests. Just as Damon is about to kill James, Laura kills Damon. She hands over half of their medical supplies to the other camp and reminds them that they must work together from now on. Nick returns to the house, James and Lily reconcile, Laura and Lev become a couple, and Becky leaves with Benji to help others in need.

The five remaining friends, including the two responsible for the breakdown of modern infrastructure, are later seen working with all the others from the area, planting gardens.

== Cast ==
- Kerry Bishé as Lily Palmer
- Caroline Dhavernas as Becky Snider
- Adrian Grenier as James Palmer
- Gaby Hoffmann as Laura Shepherd
- Ben McKenzie as Nick Randworth
- Scott Mescudi as Lev Berkowitz
- Mark Webber as Benji Henry
- Mckenna Grace as Hannah Palmer
- Remy Nozik as Ariel
- Linc Hand as Damon Mosley

== Release ==
The film had its world premiere at the 2013 Los Angeles Film Festival on June 15, 2013. It won the award for Best Feature at the New Hampshire Film Festival on October 19, 2013. Shortly after, Samuel Goldwyn Films and Phase 4 Films jointly acquired all United States rights in October 2013. It was released in theaters and on iTunes on April 4, 2014.

== Reception ==
Rotten Tomatoes, a review aggregator, reports that 24% of 25 surveyed critics gave the film a positive review; the average rating was 4.4/10. Metacritic rated it 36/100, which indicates generally unfavorable reviews. Inkoo Kang of the Los Angeles Times called it "an unconvincing, poorly conceived hybrid of end-of-the-world thriller and relationship drama". Nicolas Rapold of The New York Times, in comparing it to a TV drama, called the characters overwritten and the story oblivious. Stephen Farber of The Hollywood Reporter wrote that the film plays out like a soap opera and should have focused more on suspense. Scott Foundas of Variety called the characters "the whiniest, most self-entitled [protagonists] this side of the worst mumblecore movie you barely remember seeing." G. Allen Johnson of the San Francisco Chronicle called the characters annoying and unworthy to survive the apocalypse. Amongst the few positive reviews, Mark Adams of Screen Daily called it "engagingly performed, beautifully shot and always absorbing", while Katie Walsh of Indiewire called it an "entertaining and realistic" film with varying levels of characterization.
