= Jess Weixler =

American actress (born 1981 / 82)

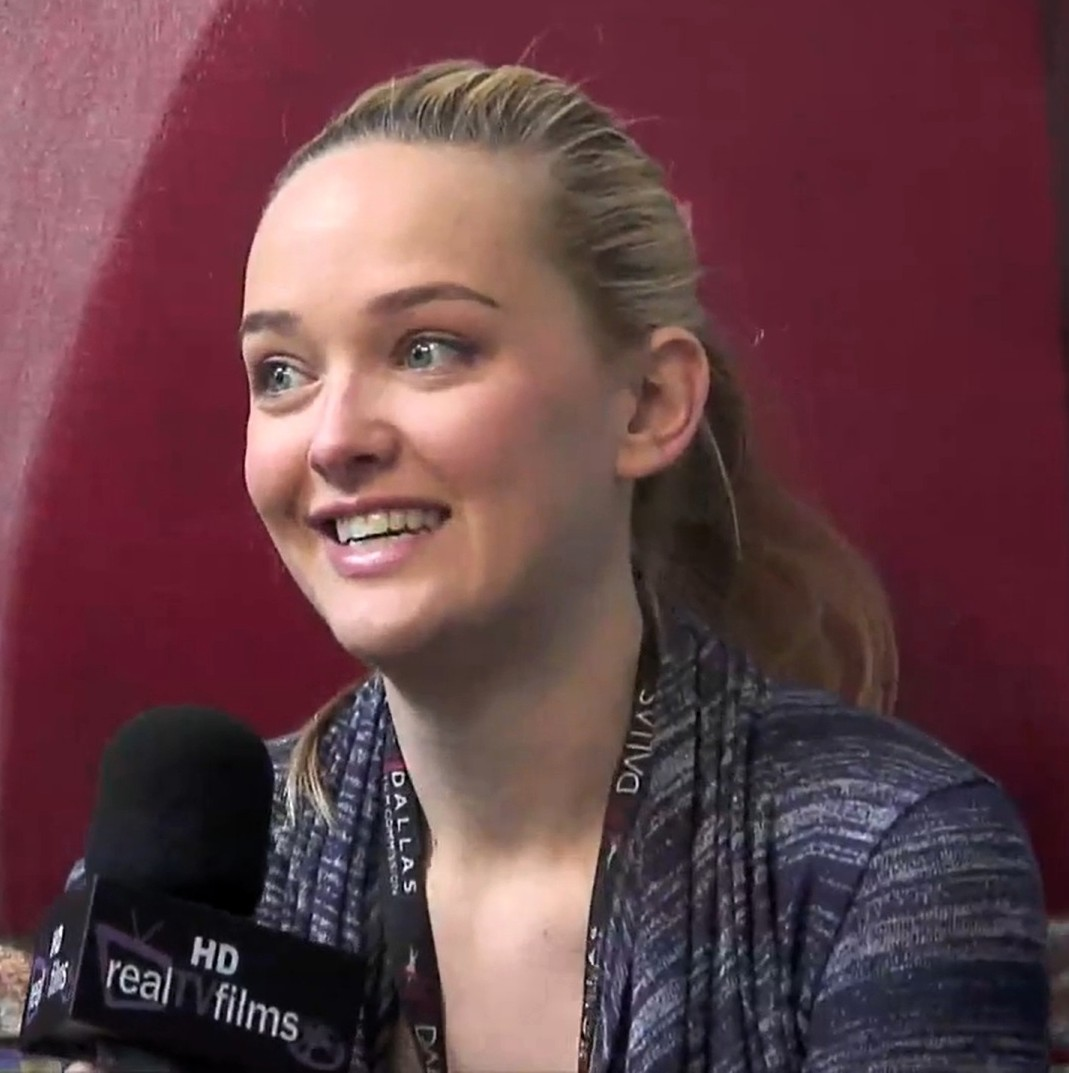
- Weixler in 2009
- Born: Jessica Weixler; June 8, 1981 (age 45); Louisville, Kentucky, U.S.
- Education: Juilliard School (BFA)
- Occupation: Actress
- Years active: 2003–present
- Spouse: Hamish Brocklebank (m. 2015)
- Children: 1

Jessica Weixler (born June 8, 1981) is an American actress. She played Dawn O'Keefe in the comedy horror film Teeth and Jordan in the comedy The Big Bad Swim and played the role of defense lawyer for Lyle Menendez in the Netflix series Monsters: The Lyle and Erik Menendez Story.

== Early life ==
Born in Louisville, Kentucky on June 8, 1981, Weixler is the only child of Mark Weixler, a photo re-toucher, and Donna Emerick, a nurse. The couple divorced shortly after her birth and Weixler was raised by her father in and around Louisville. She attended Westport Middle School and graduated from Atherton High School in 1999. During that period, she also attended the Walden Theatre Conservatory Program. In addition, she was in The River City Players acting group and the Chamber Singers choral group. Subsequently, she attended Juilliard, graduating in 2003 with a BA in theater arts. While there, Weixler befriended classmate—and future onscreen sibling—Jessica Chastain and was a participant during the first year of Bruce Brubaker's InterArts performance project.

== Career ==
In November 2003, Weixler made her prime time TV debut alongside David Morse, Andre Braugher and Robert Pastorelli in "Blind Faith", an episode in the CBS crime series, Hack, in which key murder witness Weixler finds her own life under attack even as her sanity is questioned. In 2007 Weixler was nominated for a Breakthrough Award at the Gotham Awards, and won the Special Jury Prize "for a juicy and jaw-dropping performance" at the Sundance Film Festival, both for her role in Teeth. She also appeared in the TV series Law & Order: Criminal Intent. In January 2009, she was named by New York magazine as the "New Indie Queen" of the year and one of the fourteen "New Yorkers you need to know".

In 2013, she joined the cast of CBS series The Good Wife, playing investigator Robyn Burdine. That same year she appeared in The Disappearance of Eleanor Rigby as the title character's sister. The part was written specifically for her.

Weixler next turned her hand to writing, penning the script for Apartment Troubles with her friend, and former roommate Jennifer Prediger. The two co-directed and co-starred in the movie. Apartment Troubles premiered at the 2014 Los Angeles Film Festival. It was picked up by Gravitas Ventures and given theatrical and VOD distribution in March 2015.

In June 2015, she joined the cast of Money, directed by Martin Rosete and produced by Atit Shah.

She played Audra Phillips in the sequel It Chapter Two.

== Personal life ==
In December 2015, Weixler married Hamish Brocklebank, an English businessman and co-founder of Flooved, a school textbook distribution company. In 2019 their first daughter was born.

== Filmography ==
=== Film ===
Year	Title	Role	Notes
2005	Little Manhattan	TV Cowgirl	
2006	The Big Bad Swim	Jordan Gallagher	
2007	Teeth	Dawn O'Keefe	
2007	Goodbye Baby	Denise	
2009	Peter and Vandy	Vandy	
2009	Alexander the Last	Alex	
2009	Welcome to Academia	Sophie	
2009	Today's Special	Carrie	
2010	As Good as Dead	Amy	Uncredited
2010	A Woman	Julie	
2010	Audrey the Trainwreck	Tammy	
2010	Yes	Woman	Short film
2011	The Lie	Clover	
2011	The Man Who Never Cried	Ginny	Short film
2011	Periphery	Madison	
2012	Somebody Up There Likes Me	Lyla	
2012	Free Samples	Jillian	
2012	Best Man Down	Kristin	
2012	The Normals	Gretchen	
2013	The Disappearance of Eleanor Rigby: Her	Katy Rigby	
2013	The Face of Love	Summer	
2014	Listen Up Philip	Holly Kane	
2014	The Disappearance of Eleanor Rigby: Them	Katy Rigby	
2014	Apartment Troubles	Nicole	
2015	Lamb	Linny	
2016	Sister Cities	Austin Baxter	
2016	Money	Sylvia	
2017	Entanglement	Hanna Weathers	
2017	Who We Are Now	Gabby	
2019	Chained for Life	Mabel	
2019	The Death of Dick Long	Jane Long	
2019	It Chapter Two	Audra Phillips	
2020	Ava	Judy Faulkner	
2020	Fully Realized Humans	Jackie	Also writer and associate producer
2021	The Eyes of Tammy Faye	Makeup Artist (voice)	
2026	Let's Love	Jess	

=== Television ===
Year	Title	Role	Notes
2003	Guiding Light	Caroline Boyle	1 Episode
2003	Hack	Martha Skulnick	Episode: "Blind Faith"
2004	Everwood	Nikki	Episode: "Do or Die"
2005	Law & Order: Criminal Intent	Amy Buckley	Episode: "In the Wee Small Hours"
2009	Law & Order: Criminal Intent	Laura Green	Episode: "The Glory That Was..."
2010	Medium	Mandy Sutton	Episode: "An Everlasting Love"
2010	Law & Order	Carrie Newton	Episode: "Brilliant Disguise"
2013–2014	The Good Wife	Robyn Burdine	Recurring role (19 episodes)
2017–2019	The Son	Sally McCullough	Main role
2018	Deception	Joan	Episode: "Escapology"
2024	Monsters: The Lyle and Erik Menendez Story	Jill Lansing	3 episodes

=== Web ===
Year	Title	Role	Notes
2020	Day by Day	Riley's Mom (voice)	2 episodes
