= Tom Odell discography =

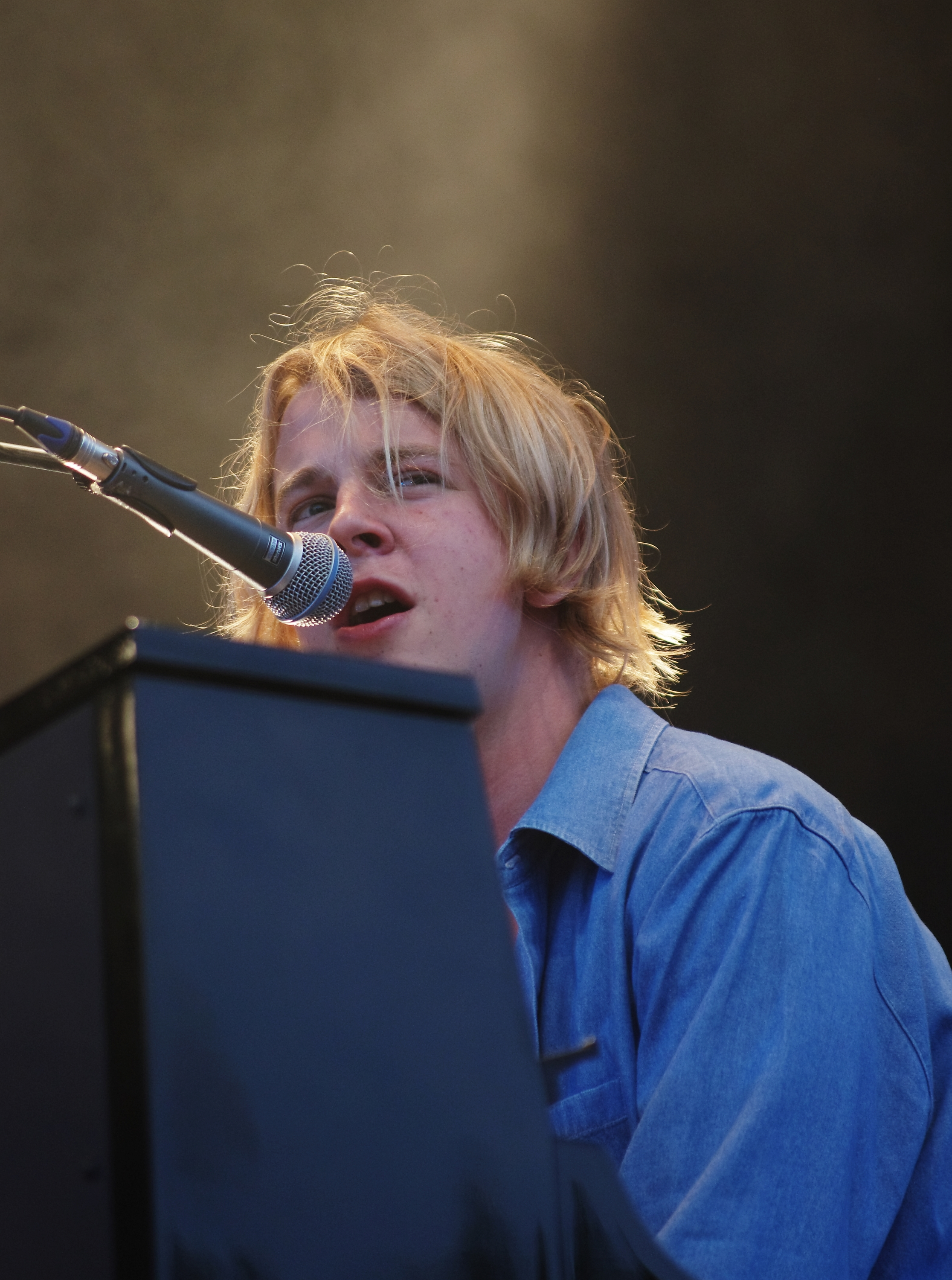
- Odell performing live at Haldern Pop Festival in 2013.
- Studio albums: 7
- EPs: 5
- Live albums: 1
- Remix albums: 1
- Singles: 36
- Promotional singles: 2
- Music videos: 42
- Featured singles: 1
- Reissues: 1

English singer-songwriter Tom Odell has released seven studio albums, one remix album, five extended plays, thirty-six singles (including one as a featured artist) and forty-two music videos.

In 2012, Odell signed with Columbia Records and released his debut extended play Songs from Another Love, which included the single "Another Love." The song achieved international success, particularly in Europe, reaching the top ten in several countries, including Austria, Scotland, and the United Kingdom. In 2013, Odell released his debut studio album Long Way Down, which topped the charts in the Netherlands and the United Kingdom and reached the top ten in multiple other countries. The album was later certified Platinum by the British Phonographic Industry (BPI).

Odell's second studio album, Wrong Crowd, was released in June 2016. It peaked at number two on the UK Albums Chart and reached the top ten in Ireland, the Netherlands, and Switzerland. The album was certified Gold by the BPI and produced six singles, including "Wrong Crowd," and the top-forty hit "Magnetised." In 2018, Odell released "If You Wanna Love Somebody" as the lead single from his third studio album, Jubilee Road, which was issued on 26 October 2018. His fourth album, Monsters, was released on 9 July 2021. and was preceded by the single "Numb." Both Jubilee Road and Monsters reached the top ten on the UK Albums Chart, peaking at numbers five and four, respectively. Monsters was Odell’s final release with Columbia Records before their separation in 2021. Odell's fifth studio album, Best Day of My Life, was released on 28 October 2022 through UROK, marking his first release as an independent artist. It debuted at number seven on the UK, becoming his fifth consecutive top-ten record in the country. That same year, Odell's debut single "Another Love" experienced a resurgence in popularity, marking his return to the singles charts in several territories and surpassing its initial chart performance.

In 2023, Odell released "Black Friday," the lead single from his sixth studio album of the same name. The song achieved commercial success, further establishing Odell’s return to the singles charts across multiple territories. The album was released on 12 January 2024 and became Odell’s sixth consecutive top-ten album in the UK, debuting at number five. It also reached the top ten in several other territories, including Belgium, Scotland, and the Netherlands. That same year, a remix of "Black Friday" by Belgian producer and DJ Lost Frequencies titled "Black Friday (Pretty Like the Sun)" achieved additional commercial success, reaching number one in Flanders, the top ten in the Netherlands, and the top forty in seven other countries.

Odell released his seventh studio album, A Wonderful Life, on 5 September 2025. The album debuted at number twelve on the UK, becoming his lowest-charting release and the first to miss the top-ten. It achieved greater success internationally, debuting within the top ten in six other countries. A reissue of the album, titled A Wonderful Life (Epilogue), was released a month later in October 2025 and featured two additional tracks.

== Studio albums ==
List of studio albums, with selected details and chart positions
Title	Details	Peak chart positions										Certifications
Title	Details	UK	AUS	AUT	BEL	GER	IRE	NLD	NZ	POL	SWI	Certifications
Long Way Down	Released: 24 June 2013; Label: Columbia; Format: CD, digital download	1	66	48	5	17	5	1	39	31	2	BPI: Platinum; BVMI: Gold; NVPI: Platinum; ZPAV: Platinum
Wrong Crowd	Released: 10 June 2016; Label: Columbia; Format: CD, digital download, LP	2	29	35	13	16	6	9	— (Note: Wrong Crowd did not enter the NZ Top 40 Albums Chart, but peaked at number 6 on the NZ Heatseeker Albums Chart.)	15	2	BPI: Gold
Jubilee Road	Released: 26 October 2018; Label: Columbia; Format: CD, digital download, LP	5	—	53	56	66	27	30	—	44	20	
Monsters	Released: 9 July 2021; Label: Columbia; Format: CD, digital download, LP	4	—	—	195	—	35	—	—	—	43	
Best Day of My Life	Released: 28 October 2022; Label: UROK, Mtheory; Format: CD, digital download	7	—	—	185	—	—	—	—	—	29	
Black Friday	Released: 26 January 2024; Label: UROK; Format: CD, digital download, LP	5	—	43	8	32	64	9	—	62	20	
A Wonderful Life	Released: 5 September 2025; Label: UROK; Format: CD, digital download, LP	12	—	8	4	9	—	4	—	84	—	
"—" denotes album that did not chart or was not released in that territory.

=== Reissues ===
List of reissues, with selected details
Title	Details	Ref.
A Wonderful Life (Epilogue)	Released: 10 October 2025; Label: UROK; Format: CD, digital download, LP	

=== Remix albums ===
List of remix albums, with selected details
Title	Details	Ref.
Wrong Crowd (East 1st Street Piano Tapes)	Released: 10 June 2016; Label: Sony Music; Format: Digital download, streaming	

=== Live albums ===
List of live albums, with selected details
Title	Details	Ref.
Live at Union Chapel	Released: 28 July 2023; Label: UROK; Format: Digital download, streaming	

== Extended plays ==
List of extended plays, with selected details
Title	Details	Ref.
Songs from Another Love	Released: 15 October 2012; Label: Columbia, In the Name Of; Format: Digital download, vinyl	
iTunes Festival: London 2013	Released: 12 September 2013; Label: Sony Music; Format: Digital download	
Spending All My Christmas with You	Released: 9 December 2016; Label: Columbia; Format: Digital download	
Apple Music Home Session: Tom Odell	Released: 16 December 2022; Label: Sony Music; Format: Digital download, streaming	
Black Friday EP	Released: 12 January 2024; Label: UROK; Format: Digital download, streaming	

== Singles ==
=== As lead artist ===
List of singles as lead artist, showing year released, selected chart positions, certifications, and album
Title	Year	Peak chart positions										Certifications	Album or EP
Title	Year	UK	AUS	AUT	BEL	GER	IRE	NLD	SWI	US Rock	WW	Certifications	Album or EP
"Another Love"	2012	10	21	2	1	9	6	6	4	11	14	BPI: 6× Platinum; ARIA: 12× Platinum; BEA: Platinum; BVMI: 11× Gold; IFPI AUT: Gold; IFPI SWI: Platinum; RIAA: Platinum; NVPI: Gold; RMNZ: 5× Platinum	Long Way Down
"Can't Pretend"	2013	67	—	—	52	—	—	—	—	—	—	BPI: Silver	Long Way Down
"Hold Me"	2013	44	—	—	—	—	—	—	—	—	—		Long Way Down
"Grow Old with Me"	2013	46	—	—	53	—	—	—	—	—	—	BPI: Silver	Long Way Down
"I Know"	2013	92	—	—	70	—	—	—	—	—	—		Long Way Down
"Real Love"	2014	7	—	—	71	—	16	83	—	—	—	BPI: Silver	Spending All My Christmas With You
"Wrong Crowd"	2016	—	—	—	—	—	—	—	—	—	—		Wrong Crowd
"Magnetised"	2016	40	—	—	51	—	62	—	73	— (Note: "Magnetised" did not enter the Billboard Hot Rock & Alternative Songs chart, but peaked at number 20 on the Adult Alternative Airplay chart.)	—	BPI: Silver	Wrong Crowd
"Here I Am"	2016	— (Note: "Here I Am" did not enter the UK Top 100 but peaked at number 73 on the UK Singles Downloads Chart Top 100.)	—	—	58	—	—	—	—	—	—		Wrong Crowd
"Concrete"	2016	—	—	—	—	—	—	—	—	—	—		Wrong Crowd
"True Colours"	2016	— (Note: "True Colours" did not enter the UK Singles Chart Top 100 but peaked at number 70 on the UK Singles Downloads Chart Top 100.)	—	—	—	—	—	—	—	—	—		Non-album single
"Silhouette"	2016	— (Note: "Silhouette" did not enter the UK Singles Chart Top 100 but peaked at number 72 on the UK Singles Downloads Chart Top 100.)	—	—	—	—	—	—	—	—	—		Wrong Crowd
"Jealousy"	2017	—	—	—	—	—	—	—	—	—	—		Wrong Crowd
"If You Wanna Love Somebody"	2018	— (Note: "If You Wanna Love Somebody" did not enter the UK Singles Chart Top 100 but peaked at number 79 on the UK Singles Downloads Chart Top 100.)	—	—	—	—	—	—	—	—	—		Jubilee Road
"Half as Good as You" (featuring Alice Merton)	2018	—	—	—	—	—	—	—	—	—	—		Jubilee Road
"Go Tell Her Now"	2019	—	—	—	—	—	—	—	—	—	—		Jubilee Road
"Numb"	2021	—	—	—	—	—	—	—	—	—	—		Monsters
"Monster"	2021	—	—	—	—	—	—	—	—	—	—		Monsters
"Money"	2021	—	—	—	—	—	—	—	—	—	—		Monsters
"Lose You Again"	2021	— (Note: "Lose You Again" did not enter the UK Top 100, but peaked at number 76 on the Official UK Singles Downloads Chart Top 100.)	—	—	—	—	—	—	—	—	—		Monsters
"Best Day of My Life"	2022	— (Note: "Best Day of My Life" did not enter the UK Singles Chart Top 100 but peaked at number 51 on the UK Singles Downloads Chart Top 100.)	—	—	—	—	—	—	—	—	—		Best Day of My Life
"Sad Anymore"	2022	—	—	—	—	—	—	—	—	—	—		Best Day of My Life
"Flying"	2022	—	—	—	—	—	—	—	—	—	—		Best Day of My Life
"Smiling All the Way Back Home"	2022	—	—	—	—	—	—	—	—	—	—		Best Day of My Life
"Butterflies" (featuring Aurora)	2023	—	—	—	—	—	—	—	—	—	—		Non-album singles
"Streets of Heaven"	2023	—	—	—	—	—	—	—	—	—	—		Non-album singles
"Black Friday"	2023	21	95	—	45	—	6	63	52	35	—	BPI: Silver; BEA: Gold; RMNZ: Gold	Black Friday
"Somebody Else"	2023	—	—	—	—	—	—	—	—	—	—		Black Friday
"Answer Phone"	2023	—	—	—	—	—	—	—	—	—	—		Black Friday
"The End"	2023	—	—	—	—	—	—	—	—	—	—		Black Friday
"Black Friday (Pretty Like the Sun)" (with Lost Frequencies)	2024	50	71	32	1	23	37	5	5	—	118	ARIA: 2× Platinum; BEA: Platinum	Non-album single
"Don't Let Me Go"	2025	—	—	—	—	—	—	—	—	—	—		A Wonderful Life
"Don’t Cry, Put Your Head On My Shoulder"	2025	—	—	—	—	—	—	—	—	—	—		A Wonderful Life
"Ugly"	2025	—	—	—	—	—	—	—	—	—	—		A Wonderful Life
"When I Close My Eyes"	2025	—	—	—	—	—	—	83	—	—	—		A Wonderful Life (Epilogue)
"Over" (with Sydney Rose)	2026	—	—	—	—	—	—	—	—	—	—		
"Old Lovers" (featuring The Lumineers)	2026	—	—	—	—	—	—	—	—	—	—		
"—" denotes single that did not chart or was not released in that territory.

=== Featuring artist ===
List of singles as a featuring artist with chart positions and selected details
Title	Year	Peak chart positions	Album	Ref.
Title	Year	US Dance/Mix	Album	Ref.
Best Day of My Life (BUNT. Version) BUNT. featuring Tom Odell	2025	29	Non-album single	

=== Promotional singles ===
Title	Year	Album
"Sirens"	2013	Long Way Down
"Jubilee Road"	2018	Jubilee Road

=== Other certified songs ===
Title	Year	Certifications	Album
"Heal"	2013	BPI: Gold; RMNZ: Gold	Long Way Down

== Guest appearances ==
Title	Year	Other artist(s)	Album	Ref.
"Fiction"	2016	Kygo	Cloud Nine	
"Summer Day"	2019	None	Moominvalley (Official Soundtrack)	
"Old Friend"	2024	Zaho de Sagazan	La Symphonie des Éclairs (Le dernier des voyages)	

== Music videos ==
List of music videos, showing year released and directors
Title	Year	Director	Ref.
"Sense"	2012	Unknown	
"Another Love"	2012	Bella Monticelli	
"Hold Me"	2013	Sophie Muller	
"Another Love" (Short Film)	2013	Jamie Thraves	
"Grow Old with Me"	2013	Alex Southam	
"I Know"	2013	Magnus Härdner	
"Real Love"	2014	Unknown	
"Wrong Crowd"	2016	George Belfield	
"Magnetised"	2016	George Belfield	
"Somehow"	2016	George Belfield	
"Concrete"	2016	George Belfield	
"Here I Am"	2016	George Belfield	
"True Colours"	2016	Isaac John	
"Silhouette"	2016	Charles Mehling	
"Jealousy"	2017	Fraser Muggeridge Studio	
"If You Wanna Love Somebody"	2018	Sophie Littman	
"Jubilee Road"	2018	Sophie Littman	
"Half As Good As You"	2018	Sophie Littman	
"Go Tell Her Now"	2019	that jam	
"Numb"	2021	Tom Odell and Joseph Delaney	
"Monster v.1"	2021	Tom Odell and Georgie Sommerville	
"Monster v.2"	2021	Tom Odell and his fans	
"Money"	2021	Georgie Somerville	
"Lose You Again"	2021	Unknown	
"Best Day Of My Life"	2022	Manshen Lo	
"Sad Anymore"	2022	Manshen Lo	
"Flying :))"	2022	Manshen Lo	
"Just Another Thing We Don't Talk About"	2022	Manshen Lo	
"Butterflies"	2023	Simon Lane	
"Streets of Heaven"	2023	Johanna Gousset	
"Black Friday"	2023	Lucca Lutzky	
"Somebody Else"	2023	Lucca Lutzky	
"Answer Phone"	2023	Lucca Lutzky	
"The End"	2023	Lucca Lutzky	
"Loving You Will Be The Death Of Me"	2024	Lucca Lutzky	
"La symphonie des éclairs"	2024	Vincent Bordes	
"Black Friday (Live Session)"	2024	Vincent Bordes	
"Don't Let Me Go"	2025	Alex Leggatt	
"Don't Cry, Put Your Head On My Shoulder"	2025	Alex Leggatt	
"Ugly"	2025	Alex Leggatt	
"Best Day Of My Life (BUNT. Version)"	2025	Louis Kortmann	
"Wonderful Life"	2025	Alex Leggatt	
