= If I Stay (soundtrack) =

If I Stay (Original Motion Picture Soundtrack)

Soundtrack album by Various artists
- Released: August 19, 2014
- Recorded: 2014
- Genres: Pop; ballad; R&B; classical
- Length: 49:38
- Label: WaterTower Music

If I Stay (Original Motion Picture Soundtrack) is the soundtrack album to the 2014 film of the same name released by WaterTower Music on August 19, 2014. The album features a compilation of songs from The Orwells, Tanlines, Lucius, Odessa, Ane Brun, Linnea Olsson, Sonic Youth, Beck, Tom Odell, Ben Howard. The fictional band Willamette Stone also contributed to the album, which were played by Vancouver-based alternative rock band Hawking, and produced by indie rock producer Adam Lasus. The songs performed by the band were written specifically for the film.

"It was immediately clear to me that If I Stay needed to feature a soundtrack assembled from a wide variety of styles and genres and would meld together to form an emotional, symphonic whole. The songs would reflect Adam's (Blackley) roots in punk music and his contemporary sensibility, as well as the classical canon that Mia (Moretz) would master to apply to Juilliard. As I would often tell the cast and crew, in the world of If I Stay, music is the air that people breathe."

— R. J. Cutler

The album received generally positive reviews from critics, and music listeners and peaked at number 54 on the Billboard 200 in the United States, and number 77 in Australia. A vinyl edition of the album was released on October 23, 2014.

== Reception ==
Timothy Monger of Allmusic mentioned the soundtrack as "an enjoyable mix of melodic, guitar-based indie rock and acoustic ballads". Writing for ABC News, Allan Raible compared the soundtrack to the music of The Perks of Being a Wallflower (2012), Garden State (2004) and The Bling Ring (2013), as it is "obviously constructed to compliment [sic] the specific tone of the movie above all else". He concluded "While this soundtrack plays with expected conventions of the teen-romance genre, it also takes some clever, unexpected chances."

Bruce E. Steele of Asheville Citizen-Times reviewed the soundtrack, saying "The soundtrack leans toward pop rock a la 1993 — Beck, Smashing Pumpkins, Sonic Youth — and Adam’s supposedly punk-inspired band is actually reminiscent of Goo Goo Dolls’ better songs. With the AAA tunes and two near-perfect 30-something parents (Mireille Enos and Joshua Leonard, both adorable in the extensive flashbacks), “If I Stay” plays as much to moms as to actual adolescents. Speaking of music: Any teen movie that teases out deep feelings from pieces by Bach, Saint-Saens and Beethoven gets bonus points — even if the movie's corporate handlers were too squeamish to put the cello music on the standard soundtrack album."

Three of the original songs: "Heart Like Yours", "I Never Wanted To Go" and "Mind", performed by Williamette Stone were shortlisted for the 87th Academy Awards, but could not get selected.

== Track listing ==
If I Stay: Original Motion Picture Soundtrack
No.	Title	Artist	Length
1.	"Who Needs You"	The Orwells	3:19
2.	"Until We Get There"	Lucius	3:28
3.	"I Want What You Have"	Willamette Stone	3:30
4.	"All of Me"	Tanlines	3:50
5.	"Promise"	Ben Howard	6:21
6.	"Never Coming Down"	Willamette Stone	3:23
7.	"Halo"	Ane Brun and Linnea Olsson	3:52
8.	"I Will Be There"	Odessa	4:35
9.	"Mind"	Willamette Stone	3:13
10.	"Morning"	Beck	5:22
11.	"Karen Revisited"	Sonic Youth	11:12
12.	"Today"	Willamette Stone	2:42
13.	"Heart Like Yours"	Willamette Stone	3:20
14.	"Heal" (If I Stay version)	Tom Odell	3:13
Total length:			61:19

If I Stay: Original Motion Picture Soundtrack – Deluxe edition
No.	Title	Artist	Length
1.	"Who Needs You"	The Orwells	3:19
2.	"Until We Get There"	Lucius	3:28
3.	"I Want What You Have"	Willamette Stone	3:30
4.	"All of Me"	Tanlines	3:50
5.	"Promise"	Ben Howard	6:21
6.	"Never Coming Down"	Willamette Stone	3:23
7.	"Halo"	Ane Brun and Linnea Olsson	3:52
8.	"I Will Be There"	Odessa	4:35
9.	"Mind"	Willamette Stone	3:13
10.	"Morning"	Beck	5:22
11.	"I Never Wanted to Go"	Willamette Stone	3:33
12.	"Karen Revisited"	Sonic Youth	11:12
13.	"Today"	Willamette Stone	2:42
14.	"Heart Like Yours"	Willamette Stone	3:20
15.	"Heal" (If I Stay version)	Tom Odell	3:13
16.	"Suite No. 1 in G Major for Solo Cello, BWV 1007: Prelude"	Johann Sebastian Bach	2:58
17.	"Cello Concerto in A Minor, op. 33"	Camille Saint-Saëns	1:20
18.	"Sonata in B Minor for Solo Cello, op. 8"	Alisa Weilerstein and Zoltán Kodály	3:46
Total length:			72:57

== Charts ==
Chart (2014)	Peak position
Australian Albums (ARIA)	77
UK Compilation Albums (OCC)	36
UK Downloads Chart (OCC)	24
UK Soundtrack Albums (OCC)	32
US Billboard 200	54
US Soundtrack Albums (Billboard)	10

== Release history ==
Region	Date	Format(s)	Label	Ref.
Various	August 19, 2014	Digital download; streaming	WaterTower Music	
Various	August 19, 2014	CD	WaterTower Music	
Various	October 23, 2014	Vinyl	WaterTower Music	
