= I Know (Tom Odell song) =

Single by Tom Odell

from the album Long Way Down
- Released: December 2013
- Genre: Folk; indie pop
- Length: 3:52
- Label: Columbia; In the Name Of
- Songwriter(s): Tom Odell; Jonny Lattimer
- Producer(s): Dan Grech-Marguerat

Tom Odell singles chronology
"Grow Old with Me" (2013)	"I Know" (2013)	"Real Love" (2014)

"I Know" is a song by British singer-songwriter Tom Odell. The track was released in the United Kingdom in December 2013 as the fifth and final single from Odell's debut studio album, Long Way Down (2013). The song reached number 92 in the UK Singles Chart.

== Track listing ==
Digital download
No.	Title	Length
1.	"I Know"	3:52

== Charts ==
Chart (2013)	Peak position
Belgium (Ultratip Bubbling Under Flanders)	20
Belgium (Ultratip Bubbling Under Wallonia)	22
UK Singles (Official Charts Company)	92
