= Magnetized (disambiguation) =

Magnetized refers to the process of acquiring magnetism.

Magnetized or Magnetised may also refer to:

- Magnetized (album)
- "Magnetised" (song)
