= If I Stay =

2009 novel by Gayle Forman

- Author: Gayle Forman
- Language: English
- Genre: Young adult fiction
- Publisher: Dutton Penguin
- Publication date: 2009
- Publication place: International
- Media type: Print (hard cover, paper back), Audiobook, eBook
- Pages: 210
- ISBN: 9780142415436
- Followed by: Where She Went
- Website: gayleforman.com

If I Stay is a young adult novel by Gayle Forman published in 2009. The story follows 17-year-old Mia Hall as she deals with the aftermath of a catastrophic car accident involving her family. Mia is the only member of her family to survive, and she finds herself in a coma. Through this coma, however, Mia has an out-of-body experience. Through this, she is able to watch the actions around her, as close friends and family gather at the hospital where she is being treated. The book follows Mia's stories and the unfolding of her life through a series of flashbacks. Mia finds herself stuck between two worlds: the world of the living, and the world of those who have moved on. Mia realizes that she must use her past and her relationships to make a decision for her future. Her options are to stay with her grandparents and Adam, her boyfriend, and cope with the grief of losing her parents and her brother. Or, join her deceased family members in the afterlife and avoid the pain of living without her mother, father, and little brother. The novel received positive reviews from the young adult audience, and Summit Entertainment optioned it in December 2010, for a 2014 film adaptation.

A novel continuing Mia's story, Where She Went, was published in April 2011.

== Plot ==
17-year-old Mia Hall is an aspiring concert cellist living in Portland, Oregon with her parents and younger brother Teddy. When school is closed one day on account of the snowy weather, the family decides to go for a morning drive, but ice on the roads causes their car to swerve into another lane, where a car crashes into theirs. Mia awakens to find the bodies of her parents, who have died upon impact. Mia comes across her own severely injured body and realizes she is having an out of body experience. She follows her physical body to the hospital, where she watches her extended family rushing to take care of her while her best friend Kim and her boyfriend Adam struggle to reach the hospital. She also watches as doctors struggle to revive Teddy, who eventually succumbs to his injuries. Through her experience, Mia reflects on her life, reminiscing about the development of her relationship with Adam, the development of her passion and talent for playing the cello, and the obstacles of being a teenager who feels out of place no matter where she goes. Mia struggles to decide whether she will awaken from the coma to be with her remaining family and Adam, or whether to join her parents and Teddy in death. She very nearly makes the decision to pass on until Adam finally reaches her hospital room and tearfully begs her to stay. Mia then experiences a vision of how the remainder of her life will play out. The novel ends just as she wakes up.

== Characters ==
- Mia Hall: Mia is a 17-year-old girl living in Oregon. Though she cares deeply and has a great deal of love for her family, and her boyfriend Adam, the one place in which Mia feels most secure is when she is playing her cello. Her idol is Ludwig van Beethoven. Mia struggles with a sense of fitting in, especially among her parents and her younger brother Teddy. While her entire family shares a great passion for music, Mia stands out as the only classical music inclined member. Both of her parents were great promoters of the rock movement. Even her younger brother Teddy, while young, is already showing an interest in rock. Mia struggles between the two versions of herself, the version that fits in with her music and the version that longs to fit in and get along easily with her family and her boyfriend. Mia struggles to understand why her boyfriend, Adam, cares for her the way he does. She can't understand how he can see past their differences. This poses problems for the two, though their relationship is inherently very strong otherwise.
- Adam Wilde: Mia Hall's boyfriend. He is very handsome and loves music. He plays guitar in the band Shooting Star, which is rapidly gaining popularity throughout Oregon. Adam's band is on tour when Mia has her accident, and this tour sets the tone for potential issues with their relationship. Though their love for each other is very strong, they both seem to be heading in separate directions. It is their love for music that is causing the separation. Mia is considering going to Juilliard and Adam must stay in the Oregon area to continue playing guitar for his band. Adam loves Mia and would do anything to make her happy. During Mia's time in the hospital after her accident, Adam does whatever he can to connect with her and wake her from her coma.
- Kim Schein: Mia's best friend. Although they originally despised one another when they first met, they soon become best friends. They are said to be very alike and are perceived as "dark and studious"—assumptions that often work to their advantage. Kim is sarcastic, and obedient to her emotional mother, up until her breaking point in which she tells her mother to get her stuff together. Kim's strength is depicted through this scene in which she pushes her own feelings aside to be a support system to her best friend. Kim has a private connection to her Jewish heritage, which she doesn't display but relies on when Mia is injured. Despite Mia's attempts to get them to be friends, Kim and Adam are not fond of each other. Kim said that their connection is only through Mia, and this connection is clearly strengthened through their ventures to get Adam to Mia when she is in the hospital.
- Teddy Hall: Mia's younger brother. Mia is extremely fond of Teddy, saying he is like her own child. Teddy admires Mia and the two are very close. The relationship between Mia and Teddy is much closer than the average brother-sister relationship. Mia's fierce protectiveness is shown immediately after the accident. Though it's clear that her mother and father's deaths affect her a great deal, her immediate concern is over Teddy's well-being. She finds herself depending on her decision on whether to leave or to stay on Teddy's survival. His death hits her extremely hard. Teddy's innocence and the loss of this innocent life is a representative of the innocence Mia will lose should she choose to stay in the physical world.
- Kat Hall: Mia's mother, who is "tough as nails, tender as kittens." She loves rock music and her family, of whom she is protective and fiercely loyal. Kat struggles to understand her daughter, who is so unlike herself and the rest of the family. She loves her unconditionally, and does her best to make Mia feel accepted and loved despite the differences between the two. Although she accepts Mia's differences, she encourages Mia to step out of the box and not be afraid to try new things. She's honest and dependable. She tells Mia all of the things she needs to hear, despite whether or not she actually wants to hear them.
- Denny Hall: Mia's father. Denny also possesses a great love for music and was in a rock band of his own before he became a father. Though music was extremely important to him, his family was more so, and because of that he finds it easy to move on and "grow up". Mia and her father share a special relationship and find themselves connecting as artists. Mia appreciates who her father is, both as a musician and a lyricist. Though Denny has given himself over to the idea of fatherhood and settling down, he still clings to his rock and roll self, dressing in odd hipster fashions and playing rock music for his family in the car. Denny pushes Mia to be the best musician she can be, and shares a special connection with her. He buys Mia her first cello and gives her a pep talk before her first ever performance.

== Themes ==
Choices: The conflict of making choices is a prominent theme in the book. The entire crux of the novel hinges on Mia's decision about where she will choose to go. Her choices become a reflection of her true character; whether she has the strength to go on in her life without her family, or whether the burden of losing them will be too much to bear. There is also an element of choice throughout many of Mia's flashbacks. The choices about whether to go to Juilliard or to stay with Adam. The choices about whether she stays true to her passions of classical music or whether to step outside the box and try to immerse herself in the world of rock.

Life and Death: This is an obvious theme in the book. Mia is confronted by the idea of life versus death and is given the rare opportunity to choose which she wants to embrace. She faces death in a very abnormal way, dealing with not only the death of her family but the potential death of herself. She also must deal with the idea of life, and all the possibilities it can bring for her.

Growing Up: Mia is forced to face the reality of growing up way before her accident, although it becomes much clearer that her life will require her to grow up very quickly should she choose to stay in the physical world. Mia struggles with leaving her childhood behind as she reaches the end of her high school career and is on the brink of entering an adult world, where she will not only be in a new place but be completely alone, where she must fend for herself.

Music: In Mia's life, music is very important to her as she is a skilled cellist that got accepted into Juilliard. All the characters including Mia's family and her boyfriend have a strong love for music which we see throughout the book. This connects all of the characters together over their shared love for something. However, this is also something that separated them as Mia has different taste in music than everyone else. Mia loves classical musical while the other characters like rock. Mia makes the choice to ultimately 'stay' due to her boyfriend, Adam, playing cello music for her in the hospital, which was the main decision she battles throughout the book.

== Sequel ==
If I Stay is followed by the sequel Where She Went, released in April 2011. The novel picks back up years after Mia's accident. This time, however, the novel is told from the perspective of Adam, Mia's (now) ex-boyfriend. The two were going through a hard time when Mia made the decision to end her relationship with Adam and left to go to New York to attend the Juilliard School of Music. The sequel follows their reunion through one night in New York, and takes them on a wild ride that might bring the two back together.

== Reception ==
Lyn Rashid of the School Library Journal explained that the novel has "captivating characters" that "will cause [readers] to laugh, cry, and love" and "question the boundaries of family and love." Mia has a "compelling story" said Rashid.

In terms of thematic interpretations, Elle Wolterbeek of the Journal of Adolescent and Adult Literacy explained that "[m]usic is an extremely important aspect of the story."

According to the Thuy On, "The title refers to the battle between fate and self-will." The reviewer also agreed that the novel addressed "the tug of familial and sexual love and the bonds between friends as well as the passion for music."

== Film adaptation ==
After the book's success, Forman decided to collaborate with Summit Entertainment to bring the novel to the big screen. In December 2010, it was announced that a film was in the works and that Dakota Fanning, Chloë Grace Moretz, and Emily Browning were in talks to play Mia. Chloë Grace Moretz eventually ended up securing the role on January 24, 2013. Catherine Hardwicke, director of the first Twilight film, was originally set to direct the film adaptation, but she was eventually replaced by Brazilian filmmaker Heitor Dhalia, who also left the film later. On January 24, 2013, R.J. Cutler was announced as the new director of the film. In January 2014, Metro-Goldwyn-Mayer and Warner Bros. Pictures were announced to distribute the film, and it was released on August 22, 2014. The film ended up bringing in about $78 million into box offices.

== Bibliography ==
- Forman, Gayle. If I Stay: A Novel. New York: Dutton, 2009. Prit.
