= Songs from Another Love =

EP by Tom Odell
- Released: 15 October 2012
- Genres: Acoustic; folk
- Length: 15:40
- Labels: Columbia; In the Name Of

Tom Odell chronology
Songs from Another Love (2012)	Long Way Down (2013)

Songs from Another Love is an extended play (EP) from singer-songwriter Tom Odell, made in honor of Gabriel (a friend of Tom Odell). The four-track extended play was first released in the United Kingdom on 15 October 2012 through Columbia and In the Name Of.

== Reception ==
Professional ratings
Review scores
Source	Rating
The Gizzle Review	3/5 stars

Songs from Another Love was met with generally favourable reviews from critics, with The Gizzle Review awarding the extended play three out of five stars; reviewing: "The comparison to Jeff Buckley's evocative troubadour songs is just, every crack in Odell's vocal imbued with heart-breaking darkness. There's a great influence of Chris Martin too, particularly the sliding vocal melodies of "Sense" accompanied solely by piano. "Can't Pretend" continues the Coldplay vibe, whilst the thrumming guitar of demo track "Stay Tonight" is similar to Ben Howard (the current top dog of the troubadour world). It's the polished title track "Another Love" that stands out most though. Odell's voice whispers and breaks with alluring fragility, before powerfully soaring above the crescendo of piano and drums. It's a sound indebted to the past rather than heralding an exciting new fusion of styles, but Odell is certainly an accomplished talent."

== Track listing ==
No.	Title	Length
1.	"Another Love"	4:06
2.	"Sense"	4:24
3.	"Can't Pretend"	3:39
4.	"Stay Tonight" (Demo)	3:31
Total length:		15:40
