= Gayle Forman =

American author (born 1970)

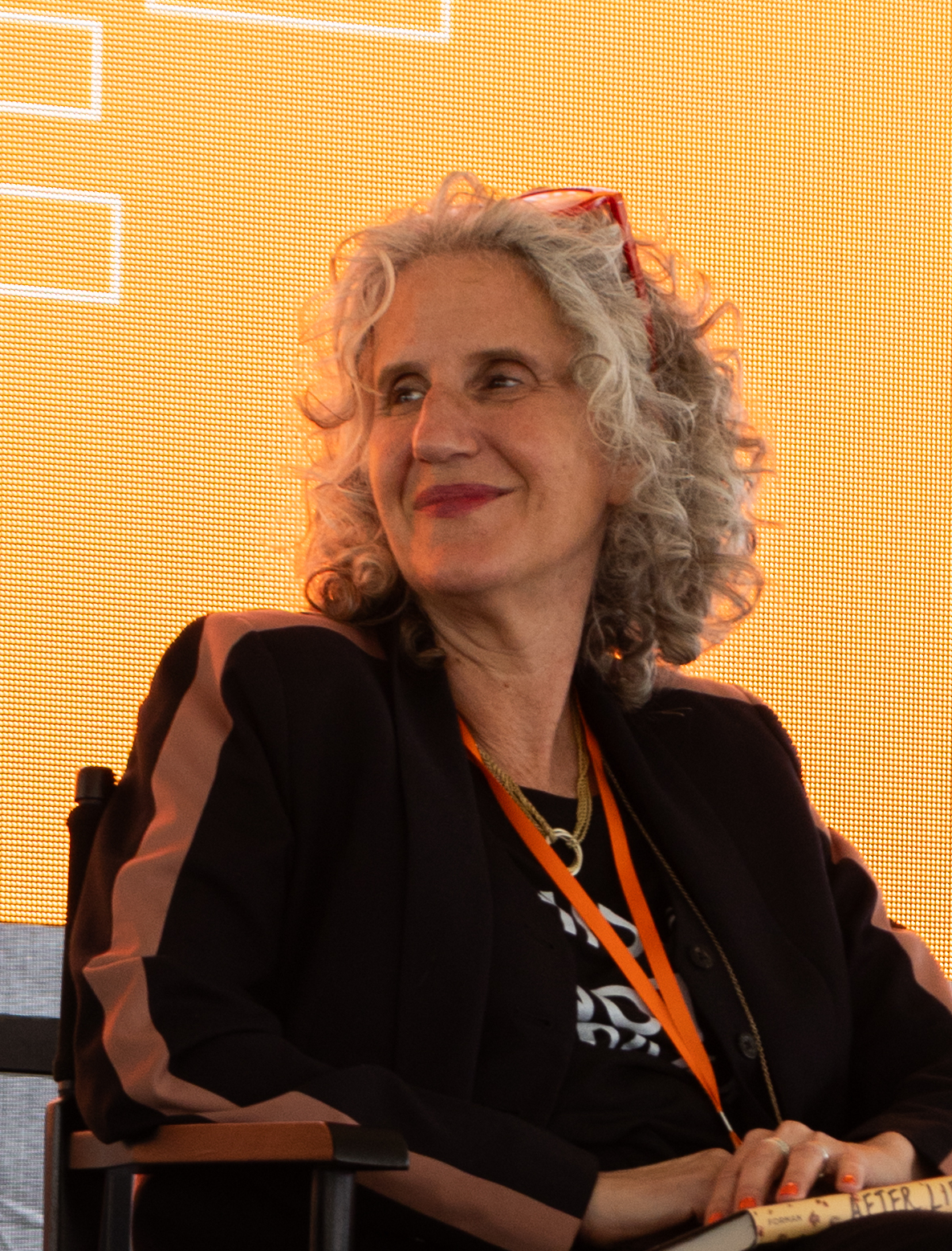
- Forman in 2025
- Born: June 5, 1970 (age 56); Los Angeles, California, U.S.
- Occupation: Author
- Writing career
- Genres: Children's books, young adult books, novels
- Notable works: If I Stay; Where She Went; Just One Day; Just One Year
- Website: gayleforman.com

Gayle Forman (born June 5, 1970) is an American young adult fiction author, best known for her novel If I Stay, which topped the New York Times best sellers list of Young Adult Fiction and was made into a film of the same name.

== Career ==
Forman began her career writing for Seventeen magazine, with most of her articles focusing on young people and social concerns. Later she became a freelance journalist for Details, Jane, Glamour, The Nation, Elle Magazine, and Cosmopolitan.

In 2002, she and her husband Nick took a trip around the world, in which she garnered experiences and information which later served as the basis for her first book, a travelogue, You Can't Get There From Here: A Year On the Fringes of a Shrinking World. In 2007, she published her first young adult novel, Sisters in Sanity, based on an article she had written for Seventeen.

In 2009, Forman released If I Stay, a book about a 17-year-old girl named Mia who has been involved in a tragic car accident and lies in a coma fully aware of what is going on around her. Forman won the 2009 NAIBA Book of the Year Award, and was a 2010 Indies Choice Book Award winner for the book. The film adaptation of If I Stay, starring Chloë Grace Moretz, was released in the United States on August 22, 2014. The book's sequel, titled Where She Went, was released in 2011. Told from Adam's point of view, the novel is about Adam and Mia's relationship a few years after the accident.

In January 2013, Forman released Just One Day. The novel follows Allyson Healey, who, on the last day of a post-graduation European tour, meets a Dutch vagabond actor named Willem. In an uncharacteristic, spur-of-the moment decision, Allyson goes to Paris with Willem, where they spend a day together before he disappears. The book's sequel, Just One Year, was released in October 2013. It follows the same chronological path as Allyson's story, but told from the perspective of Willem. The final installment of Allyson and Willem's story, Just One Night, is a 50-page novella that was released in ebook format on May 29, 2014.

In January 2015, Forman released I Was Here, about an 18-year-old girl dealing with the sudden suicide of her best friend. Movie rights to the book were picked up by New Line Cinema a month later.

Forman's first adult novel, titled Leave Me, was released on September 6, 2016, with a U.K. release date of October 19, 2017.

== Awards ==
Forman won the British Fantasy Award (2010) and the ALA/YALSA Quick Pick for Reluctant Young Adult Readers (2010). She was nominated for the South Carolina Book Award for Young Adult Book Award (2011), the TAYSHAS High School Reading List (2010), the Goodreads Choice Award for Young Adult Fiction (2009), and the Milwaukee County Teen Book Award (2010).

== Personal life ==
Forman resides in Brooklyn, New York with her husband Nick Tucker and her daughter.

At the 2010 annual Los Angeles Times Festival of Books, Forman participated in panel discussions. She was on the panel "Young Adult Fiction: Teens and Turmoil" with Jandy Nelson, Cynthia Kadohata and moderator Sonya Sones.

== Books ==
- You Can't Get There from Here: A Year on the Fringes of a Shrinking World (2005)
- Sisters in Sanity (2007)
- If I Stay (2009)
- Where She Went (2011)
- Just One Day (2013)
- Just One Year (2013)
- Just One Night (2014)
- I Was Here (2015)
- Leave Me (2016)
- I Have Lost My Way (2018)
- We Are Inevitable (2021)
- Frankie & Bug (2021)
- Not Nothing (2024)
- After Life (2025)
