= Another Love (Tom Odell song) =

Single by Tom Odell

from the EP Songs from Another Love and the album Long Way Down
- Released: 15 October 2012
- Recorded: 2011
- Genre: Indie pop; pop rock; art rock; indie rock
- Length: 4:04
- Label: Columbia; In the Name Of
- Songwriter: Tom Odell
- Producer: Dan Grech-Marguerat

Tom Odell singles chronology
"Another Love" (2012)	"Can't Pretend" (2013)

"Another Love" is a song by English singer-songwriter Tom Odell, released in October 2012 as his debut single and lifted from his debut extended play, Songs from Another Love (2012). It serves as the first single on his debut studio album Long Way Down (2013).

In 2013, the song became a major commercial success in Europe, peaking at number 10 on the UK Singles Chart, and becoming Odell's first top-ten hit in that country. Outside the UK, the song charted on the Billboard Global 200, where it debuted on 24 April 2021, and reached a peak position of 14 on 29 October 2022. The song has also been on the Billboard Canadian Hot 100 and the TikTok Billboard Top 50.

In 2022, a decade after its release, the song re-appeared on charts across Europe and Australia after becoming popular on TikTok and on other social media platforms as an anthem in support of Ukraine following the Russian invasion of Ukraine and the resulting wave of refugees from Ukraine across Europe. The song represented a sign of hope for many people. Throughout Europe, the performance of the song was part of public events and demonstrations. Odell himself performed his song on 12 March 2022, at Bucharest North railway station, a main hub for refugees on their way through Romania.

The song returned to its number 10 UK Singles Chart position in January 2023. As of May 2025, the song has amassed over 3.4 billion streams on Spotify.

== Music video ==
A music video to accompany the release of "Another Love" was first released onto YouTube on 5 November 2012 at a total length of four minutes and seven seconds. It depicts Odell sitting in an armchair in front of the camera as a girl played by actress Hanako Footman attempts to get his attention. He, however seems to notice neither her nor any of his other surroundings. As time passes, the girl begins to feel more and more annoyed and disappears from screen, seemingly leaving Odell.

Another video was released, called the "short film" version, for the song's American release. It shows Odell walking the streets and showing missing person notices for a woman he does not recognize when he finally comes across her. The video features actress Sarah Navratil.

== Critical reception ==
Writing for Digital Spy, Lewis Corner stated that the song "is mourning at its most hauntingly beautiful".

== Adaptations ==
"Another Love" was adapted by the Hungarian alternative rock band Zaporozsec under the title "Azon az éjszakán" and became a number-one hit on Petőfi Rádió's Top 30 for three weeks. A music video was released onto YouTube on 2 February 2016.

== Charts ==
=== Weekly charts ===
2013–2015 weekly chart performance for "Another Love"
Chart (2013–2015)	Peak position
Austria (Ö3 Austria Top 40)	2
Belgium (Ultratop 50 Flanders)	1
Belgium (Ultratop 50 Wallonia)	16
Czech Republic Airplay (ČNS IFPI)	51
France (SNEP)	11
Germany (GfK)	11
Ireland (IRMA)	24
Luxembourg Digital Song Sales (Billboard)	9
Netherlands (Dutch Top 40)	8
Netherlands (Single Top 100)	6
Scotland Singles (Official Charts)	10
Slovakia Airplay (ČNS IFPI)	18
Slovenia (SloTop50)	27
Switzerland (Schweizer Hitparade)	23
UK Singles (Official Charts)	10

2021–2024 weekly chart performance for "Another Love"
Chart (2021–2024)	Peak position
Australia (ARIA)	21
Belgium (Ultratop 50 Flanders)	40
Belgium (Ultratop 50 Wallonia)	36
Canada Hot 100 (Billboard)	34
Canada CHR/Top 40 (Billboard)	49
Croatia (Billboard)	18
Czech Republic Singles Digital (ČNS IFPI)	5
Denmark (Tracklisten)	27
Finland (Suomen virallinen lista)	8
Germany (GfK)	9
Global 200 (Billboard)	14
Greece International (IFPI)	8
Hungary (Single Top 40)	12
Hungary (Stream Top 40)	17
Iceland (Tónlistinn)	13
Ireland (IRMA)	6
Israel (Mako Hitlist)	89
Italy (FIMI)	20
Latvia Streaming (LaIPA)	13
Lebanon (Lebanese Top 20)	12
Lithuania (AGATA)	11
Luxembourg (Billboard)	4
Middle East and North Africa (IFPI)	11
New Zealand (Recorded Music NZ)	21
Norway (VG-lista)	10
Poland (Polish Streaming Top 100)	13
Portugal (AFP)	7
Romania (Billboard)	7
Slovakia Airplay (ČNS IFPI)	5
South Africa Streaming (TOSAC)	41
Spain (PROMUSICAE)	43
Sweden (Sverigetopplistan)	17
Switzerland (Schweizer Hitparade)	4
Turkey (Billboard)	19
US Bubbling Under Hot 100 (Billboard)	5
US Adult Pop Airplay (Billboard)	27
US Hot Rock & Alternative Songs (Billboard)	11
US Rock & Alternative Airplay (Billboard)	31

Weekly chart performance for "Another Love" (Tiësto remix)
Chart (2026)	Peak position
Lithuania Airplay (TopHit)	99

=== Monthly charts ===
Monthly chart performance for "Another Love"
Chart (2022–2023)	Position
Czech Republic (Singles Digitál – Top 100)	5
Lithuania Airplay (TopHit)	91

=== Year-end charts ===
2013 year-end chart performance for "Another Love"
Chart (2013)	Position
Belgium (Ultratop Flanders)	11
Belgium (Ultratop Wallonia)	39
Germany (Media Control AG)	48
Netherlands (Dutch Top 40)	43
Netherlands (Single Top 100)	50
Switzerland (Schweizer Hitparade)	67
UK Singles (Official Charts Company)	86

2014 year-end chart performance for "Another Love"
Chart (2014)	Position
Austria (Ö3 Austria Top 40)	48
Belgium (Ultratop Wallonia)	96
France (SNEP)	26
Slovenia (SloTop50)	44
Switzerland (Schweizer Hitparade)	42

2015 year-end chart performance for "Another Love"
Chart (2015)	Position
France (SNEP)	134

2021 year-end chart performance for "Another Love"
Chart (2021)	Position
Austria (Ö3 Austria Top 40)	48
France (SNEP)	89
Germany (Official German Charts)	68
Global 200 (Billboard)	180
Ireland (IRMA)	40
Netherlands (Single Top 100)	60
Portugal (AFP)	174
Switzerland (Schweizer Hitparade)	46
UK Singles (OCC)	75

2022 year-end chart performance for "Another Love"
Chart (2022)	Position
Australia (ARIA)	54
Austria (Ö3 Austria Top 40)	9
Belgium (Ultratop 50 Flanders)	120
Belgium (Ultratop 50 Wallonia)	133
Denmark (Tracklisten)	43
Germany (Official German Charts)	13
Global 200 (Billboard)	33
Hungary (Single Top 40)	58
Hungary (Stream Top 40)	41
Iceland (Tónlistinn)	30
Italy (FIMI)	48
Lithuania (AGATA)	16
Netherlands (Single Top 100)	6
New Zealand (Recorded Music NZ)	47
Sweden (Sverigetopplistan)	18
Switzerland (Schweizer Hitparade)	7
UK Singles (OCC)	27

2023 year-end chart performance for "Another Love"
Chart (2023)	Position
Australia (ARIA)	35
Austria (Ö3 Austria Top 40)	5
Belgium (Ultratop 50 Flanders)	51
Belgium (Ultratop 50 Wallonia)	44
Brazil Streaming (Pro-Música Brasil)	187
Canada (Canadian Hot 100)	50
Denmark (Tracklisten)	73
Germany (Official German Charts)	10
Global 200 (Billboard)	16
Iceland (Tónlistinn)	31
Italy (FIMI)	52
Netherlands (Single Top 100)	8
Poland (Polish Streaming Top 100)	18
Sweden (Sverigetopplistan)	32
Switzerland (Schweizer Hitparade)	5
UK Singles (OCC)	21
US Hot Rock & Alternative Songs (Billboard)	26

2024 year-end chart performance for "Another Love"
Chart (2024)	Position
Australia (ARIA)	83
Austria (Ö3 Austria Top 40)	20
Belgium (Ultratop 50 Flanders)	55
Belgium (Ultratop 50 Wallonia)	48
France (SNEP)	41
Germany (GfK)	27
Global 200 (Billboard)	33
Hungary (Single Top 40)	98
Iceland (Tónlistinn)	58
Netherlands (Single Top 100)	32
Poland (Polish Streaming Top 100)	65
Portugal (AFP)	31
Sweden (Sverigetopplistan)	53
Switzerland (Schweizer Hitparade)	5
UK Singles (OCC)	62

2025 year-end chart performance for "Another Love"
Chart (2025)	Position
Austria (Ö3 Austria Top 40)	36
Belgium (Ultratop 50 Flanders)	101
Belgium (Ultratop 50 Wallonia)	101
France (SNEP)	65
Germany (GfK)	26
Global 200 (Billboard)	61
Netherlands (Single Top 100)	34
Poland (Polish Streaming Top 100)	92
Sweden (Sverigetopplistan)	58
Switzerland (Schweizer Hitparade)	19

== Certifications ==
Certifications for "Another Love"
Region	Certification	Certified units/sales
Australia (ARIA)	12× Platinum	840,000^{‡}
Austria (IFPI Austria)	Gold	15,000^{*}
Belgium (BRMA)	Platinum	30,000^{*}
Canada (Music Canada)	Platinum	80,000^{‡}
Denmark (IFPI Danmark)	4× Platinum	360,000^{‡}
France (SNEP)	Gold	75,000^{*}
Germany (BVMI)	11× Gold	1,650,000^{‡}
Hungary (MAHASZ)	17× Platinum	51,000^{‡}
Italy (FIMI)	6× Platinum	600,000^{‡}
Mexico (AMPROFON)	4× Platinum+Gold	270,000^{‡}
Netherlands (NVPI)	Gold	10,000^{^}
New Zealand (RMNZ)	5× Platinum	150,000^{‡}
Portugal (AFP)	Diamond	100,000^{‡}
Spain (Promusicae)	7× Platinum	420,000^{‡}
Switzerland (IFPI Switzerland)	Platinum	30,000^{^}
United Kingdom (BPI)	6× Platinum	3,600,000^{‡}
United States (RIAA)	Platinum	1,000,000^{‡}
Streaming
Greece (IFPI Greece)	Diamond	10,000,000^{†}
Sweden (GLF)	5× Platinum	40,000,000^{†}
^{*} Sales figures based on certification alone.^{^} Shipments figures based on certification alone.^{‡} Sales+streaming figures based on certification alone.^{†} Streaming-only figures based on certification alone.

== See also ==
- List of highest-certified singles in Australia
- List of best-selling singles in Germany
- List of best-selling singles in Italy
- List of best-selling singles in Spain
