= Hold Me (Tom Odell song) =

Single by Tom Odell

from the album Long Way Down
- Released: 29 March 2013
- Recorded: 2013
- Genre: Folk; indie pop
- Length: 3:09
- Label: Columbia
- Songwriter(s): Tom Odell; Eg White

Tom Odell singles chronology
"Can't Pretend" (2013)	"Hold Me" (2013)	"Grow Old with Me" (2013)

"Hold Me" is the third single released by British singer-songwriter Tom Odell, from his debut studio album, Long Way Down (2013). The song was released in the United Kingdom as a digital download on 29 March 2013. The song peaked at number 44 on the UK Singles Chart.

== Music video ==
A music video to accompany the release of "Hold Me" was first released onto YouTube on 11 February 2013 at a total length of three minutes and twenty-seven seconds.

== Critical reception ==
Lewis Corner of Digital Spy gave the song a positive review stating:

A soaring and rowdy intro immediately kick-starts his campaign with substantially more clout than his broody ballads of 2012. "Suddenly I'm standing on a treetop up so high/ And all the songs, and all the poets, suddenly they're right," he declares over clattering acoustics and pounding piano riffs, passionately drunk on the first drops of love. Fortunately, with the public's appetite for organic singer-songwriters fully renewed, Tom is making the right noise at just the right time..

== Track listing ==
Digital download
No.	Title	Length
1.	"Hold Me"	3:09

== Chart performance ==
Chart (2013)	Peak position
UK Singles (Official Charts Company)	44

== Release history ==
Region	Date	Format	Label
United Kingdom	29 March 2013	Digital download	Columbia
