= Black Friday (Tom Odell song) =

2023 single by Tom Odell

Single by Tom Odell

from the album Black Friday
- Released: 22 September 2023
- Length: 3:40
- Label: UROK
- Songwriters: Tom Odell; Laurie Blundell; Max Clilverd
- Producers: Tom Odell; Cityfall

Tom Odell singles chronology
"Streets of Heaven" (2023)	"Black Friday" (2023)	"Somebody Else" (2023)

Music video
- "Black Friday" on YouTube

"Black Friday" is a song by British singer-songwriter Tom Odell. It was released on 22 September 2023 as the lead single from his sixth studio album of the same title.

Upon release, the song earned attention after receiving momentum through viral popularity on TikTok, which helped the song to gain major success. In 2024, it was remixed by Belgian producer Lost Frequencies under the title "Black Friday (Pretty Like the Sun)", achieving further commercial success globally.

== Background and release ==
"Black Friday" was written by Tom Odell, Laurie Blundell, and Max Clilverd. The track was produced by Odell and Cityfall. The song appears as the second track on Black Friday. In the single's press release, Odell said of the track:

“I wrote this song on my birthday last year, which happened to be the day before ‘Black Friday.’ The song is inspired by my admiration and love for the people in my life, but also my proclivity to be unkind to myself. It’s a love song, I think, and I’m very proud of it, and I hope people like it.”

— Odell on writing "Black Friday", according Stereoboard

To promote the song, Odell performed the song live at The Graham Norton Show on 12 January 2024.

== Commercial performance ==
Upon release, the song achieved commercial success, entering the official charts of nine territories, including: Australia, Belgium, Ireland, Lithuania, the Netherlands, Norway, Sweden, Switzerland, and the United Kingdom.

In Ireland, the song debuted at number six on the Irish Singles Chart, becoming Odell's second chart entry, and tying with "Another Love" as his highest charting single. In the United Kingdom the song debuted at twenty-one on the UK Singles Chart, his highest charting single since his cover of "Real Love" in 2014, and his first entry since "Magnetised" on 2016, becoming his eight chart-entry. It was later certified Silver by the British Phonographic Industry.

== Critical reception ==
"Black Friday" received generally positive reviews from music critics. Writing for Happy Magazine, Tammy Moir described the track as "a powerful testament to the enduring strength of raw, authentic emotion", highlighting Odell's "raw and emotionally" delivery and the track "nothing short of extraordinary" composition. Moir dubbed the song as "a divine and haunting classic for the ages." Lightning 100 highlighted the song as their "DJ Pick of the Week", praising Odell's growth as an artist and the song's lyrical content.

The track was nominated for a Ivor Novello Award in the category of Best Song Musically and Lyrically at the awards 2024 ceremony.

== Music video ==
The song was released alongside an accompanying music video, which was directed by Lucca Lutzky.

== Track listing ==
- Digital download and streaming — Single
1. "Black Friday" — 3:40
- Black Friday — EP
1. "Black Friday" (Mahogany Session) — 3:44
2. "Black Friday" (Instrumental) — 3:41

== Personnel ==
Credits adapted from Tidal.

- Tom Odell — vocals, songwriter, composer, piano, guitar
- Laurie Blundell — songwriter, composer, synthesizer
- Max Clilverd — songwriter, composer, electric guitar
- Cityfall — producer, mixing engineer
- Dave Kutch — mastering engineer
- Kevin Peterson — assistant mastering engineer
- Amy May — viola
- Amy Stanford — viola
- Brooke Daya — viola
- Emma Owens — viola
- Helen Sanders-Hewett — viola
- Janina Kopinska — viola
- Vincent Ott — strings conductor
- Bogdan Vacarescu — first violin
- Eleanor Stanford — first violin
- Emma Parker — first violin
- Harriet Mackenzie — first violin
- Kate Robinson — first violin
- Rebekah Allan — first violin
- Akiko Ishikawa — second violin
- Camille Daya Lucie Said — second violin
- Isabelle Allan — second violin
- Joanne Davies — second violin
- Julia Stewart — second violin
- Ros Stephen — second violin
- Max Goff — bass
- Toby Couling — drums
- Desmond Neysmith — cello
- Johnny Byers — cello
- Laura Anstee — cello
- Nicholas Holland — cello
- Rebecca Hepplewhite — cello
- Susie Winkworth — cello

== In popular culture ==
In 2024, "Black Friday" was featured in the episode four "Journey" of the third season of the Netflix coming-of-age series Heartstopper. It was also used in the episode "The Return" of the season seven of the ABC police procedural series The Rookie in 2025.

== Charts ==
=== Weekly charts ===
Weekly chart performance for "Black Friday"
Chart (2023–2024)	Peak position
Australia (ARIA)	95
Belgium (Ultratop 50 Flanders)	45
Ireland (IRMA)	6
Lithuania Airplay (TopHit)	68
Netherlands (Single Top 100)	63
Norway (VG-lista)	15
Sweden (Sverigetopplistan)	97
Switzerland (Schweizer Hitparade)	52
UK Singles (OCC)	21
US Hot Rock & Alternative Songs (Billboard)	35

=== Monthly charts ===
Monthly chart performance for "Black Friday"
Chart (2023)	Peak position
Lithuania Airplay (TopHit)	82

== Certifications ==
Certifications for "Black Friday"
Region	Certification	Certified units/sales
Belgium (BRMA)	Gold	20,000^{‡}
Denmark (IFPI Danmark)	Gold	45,000^{‡}
France (SNEP)	Gold	100,000^{‡}
New Zealand (RMNZ)	Gold	15,000^{‡}
United Kingdom (BPI)	Silver	200,000^{‡}
United States (RIAA)	Gold	500,000^{‡}
^{‡} Sales+streaming figures based on certification alone.

== Black Friday (Pretty Like the Sun) ==
"Black Friday (Pretty Like the Sun)"

Single by Lost Frequencies and Tom Odell
- Released: 19 July 2024
- Genre: Deep house, Tropical House
- Length: 2:25
- Label: UROK; Lost & Cie
- Songwriters: Tom Odell; Laurie Blundell; Max Clilverd; Felix De Laet
- Producer: Lost Frequencies

Lost Frequencies singles chronology
"In My Bones" (2024)	"Black Friday (Pretty Like the Sun)" (2024)

Tom Odell singles chronology
"The End" (2023)	"Black Friday (Pretty Like the Sun)" (2024)

Lyric video
- "Black Friday (Pretty Like the Sun)" on YouTube

On 19 July 2024, Belgian producer and DJ Lost Frequencies released his remix of "Black Friday", titled "Black Friday (Pretty Like the Sun)" through UROK and Lost & Cie Music SPRL. The remix reached number one in Flanders and the top 10 in the Netherlands, as well as the top 40 in Austria, Wallonia, Germany, Ireland, Lithuania, Norway and Switzerland.

=== Charts ===
==== Weekly charts ====
Weekly chart performance for "Black Friday (Pretty Like the Sun)"
Chart (2024–2025)	Peak position
Australia (ARIA)	71
Austria (Ö3 Austria Top 40)	19
Belgium (Ultratop 50 Flanders)	1
Belgium (Ultratop 50 Wallonia)	3
CIS Airplay (TopHit)	121
Czech Republic Singles Digital (ČNS IFPI)	79
Estonia Airplay (TopHit)	12
France (SNEP)	79
Germany (GfK)	23
Global 200 (Billboard)	118
Greece International (IFPI)	40
Ireland (IRMA)	37
Latvia Airplay (LaIPA)	14
Latvia Streaming (LaIPA)	19
Lebanon English (Lebanese Top 20)	17
Lithuania (AGATA)	16
Lithuania Airplay (TopHit)	16
Luxembourg (Billboard)	12
Netherlands (Dutch Top 40)	5
Netherlands (Single Top 100)	5
New Zealand Hot Singles (RMNZ)	11
Norway (VG-lista)	40
Portugal (AFP)	74
Russia Airplay (TopHit)	176
Slovakia Airplay (ČNS IFPI)	13
Suriname (Nationale Top 40)	25
Switzerland (Schweizer Hitparade)	5
UK Singles (OCC)	50
US Hot Dance/Electronic Songs (Billboard)	16

==== Monthly charts ====
Monthly chart performance for "Black Friday (Pretty Like the Sun)"
Chart (2024–2025)	Peak position
Estonia Airplay (TopHit)	13
Lithuania Airplay (TopHit)	19
Slovakia (Rádio Top 100)	29

==== Year-end charts ====
2024 year-end chart performance for "Black Friday (Pretty Like the Sun)"
Chart (2024)	Position
Belgium (Ultratop 50 Flanders)	28
Belgium (Ultratop 50 Wallonia)	47
Estonia Airplay (TopHit)	176
Germany (GfK)	79
Netherlands (Dutch Top 40)	16
Netherlands (Single Top 100)	53
Switzerland (Schweizer Hitparade)	66
US Hot Dance/Electronic Songs (Billboard)	64

2025 year-end chart performance for "Black Friday (Pretty Like the Sun)"
Chart (2025)	Position
Belgium (Ultratop 50 Flanders)	42
Belgium (Ultratop 50 Wallonia)	102
Estonia Airplay (TopHit)	108
Netherlands (Single Top 100)	80
Switzerland (Schweizer Hitparade)	58

=== Certifications ===
Certifications for "Black Friday (Pretty Like the Sun)"
Region	Certification	Certified units/sales
Australia (ARIA)	2× Platinum	140,000^{‡}
Belgium (BRMA)	4× Platinum	80,000^{‡}
France (SNEP)	Platinum	200,000^{‡}
Germany (BVMI)	Gold	300,000^{‡}
New Zealand (RMNZ)	Platinum	30,000^{‡}
Spain (Promusicae)	Gold	30,000^{‡}
United Kingdom (BPI)	Silver	200,000^{‡}
Streaming
Greece (IFPI Greece)	Gold	1,000,000^{†}
^{‡} Sales+streaming figures based on certification alone.^{†} Streaming-only figures based on certification alone.
