= Ugly (Tom Odell song) =

Single by Tom Odell

from the album A Wonderful Life
- Released: August 8, 2025
- Length: 4:31
- Label: UROK; Virgin Music
- Songwriters: Tom Odell; Laurie Blundell; Josefina Proto
- Composers: Tom Odell; Laurie Blundell; Josefina Proto
- Producers: Tom Odell; Cityfall

Tom Odell singles chronology
"Don't Cry, Put Your Head On My Shoulder" (2025)	"Ugly" (2025)	"When I Close My Eyes" (2025)

Music video
- "Ugly" on YouTube

"Ugly" is a song by British singer and songwriter Tom Odell. It was released on 8 August 2025 through UROK and Virgin Music, as the third single from his seventh studio album, A Wonderful Life (2025)

== Background and release ==
"Ugly" was written by Tom Odell, Laurie Blundell, and Josefina Proto. The track was co-produced by Odell with Cityfall, and appears as the seven track on A Wonderful Life. The songs tackles Odell's body image issues, and his self-confidence struggles.

In the single's press release, Odell said of the track:

"Something I’ve never really talked about is some of my own weird shame around my body, and it feels so uncomfortable to actually say that in a song. But when you say it, it’s really fucking powerful. "Ugly is an exploration of what it feels like to be a human being - of looking out at the world and feeling like everybody seems to glide through life so easily, but the experience of actually living it yourself is so fraught and it’s not pretty."

— Tom Odell talking about "Ugly", via Stereoboard

It was released alongside an accompanying music video directed by Alex Leggatt on 8 August 2025.

== Reception ==
Upon its release, "Ugly" was met with positive reviews from music critics, who praised the "honest and personal" lyrical content. We Love That Sound noted that the song felt like Odell's "unofficial answer to Christina Aguilera's "Beautiful"," while dubbing it as "one of [his] Odell's strongest songs" to date. Nadine Kloppert of MonkeyPress described the track as a "deeply personal piece that opens up a view directly into the heart of the longplayer."

== Track listing ==
- Digital download and streaming
1. "Ugly" — 4:31
- Digital download and streaming – Tidal
1. "Ugly" — 4:31
2. "Don't Cry, Put Your Head On My Shoulder" — 3:51
3. "Don't Let Me Go" — 4:52

== Personnel ==
Credits adapted from TIDAL.

- Tom Odell — vocals, producer, composer, acoustic guitar, piano
- Laurie Blundell — composer, synthetizer
- Josefina Proto — composer
- Cityfall — producer, mixing engineer
- Christoph Skiri — assistant mixing engineer, assistant sound engineer
- Max Goff — bass guitar
- Toby Couling — drums
- Max Clilverd — electric guitar
- Richard Jones — violin
- Greg Calbi — mastering engineer
- Steve Fallone — mastering engineer

== Release history ==
"Ugly" release history
Region	Date	Format(s)	Label	Ref.
Various	8 August 2025	Digital download; streaming	UROK; Virgin Music	
