= Long Way Down (Tom Odell album) =

Studio album by Tom Odell
- Released: 24 June 2013
- Recorded: 2012
- Genres: Folk; indie pop
- Length: 35:20
- Label: Columbia
- Producer: Dan Grech-Marguerat

Tom Odell chronology
Songs from Another Love (2012)	Long Way Down (2013)	Wrong Crowd (2016)

Singles from Long Way Down
- 1. "Another Love" Released: 15 October 2012; 2. "Can't Pretend" Released: 6 March 2013; 3. "Hold Me" Released: 31 March 2013; 4. "Grow Old with Me" Released: 9 September 2013; 5. "I Know" Released: December 2013

Long Way Down is the debut studio album by British singer-songwriter Tom Odell. It was released on 24 June 2013 and serves as the follow-up to his 2012 extended play, Songs from Another Love. It serves as his first release with a major record label, and was released with Columbia.

== Background ==
In early 2012, Odell announced that he had signed to Columbia and began recording his debut album later on in 2012. In November 2012, Tom Odell released his first EP Songs from Another Love for which included famous hit "Another Love", which Odell released an official video on his VEVO.

Odell came in to RAK Studios in St Johns Wood with producer Dan Grech-Marguerat to record the album in the summer of 2012.

Odell announced that his first single from the album would be "Can't Pretend" which was released worldwide on 6 March 2013. It was later announced the second single to come from the album was "Hold Me". Odell performed "Hold Me" and "Can't Pretend" on both Alan Carr: Chatty Man and The Jonathan Ross Show.

In December 2012, Odell announced that the title of his debut album would be Long Way Down. In addition, he also unveiled its artwork and release date of 16 April 2013, however, due to its scheduled U.S. release date it was pushed back until 24 June 2013 to prevent the leak of the album across the rest of the world. He also announced the track listing which included "Another Love", "Can't Pretend" and "Hold Me".

== Promotion ==
To promote the album, Odell went on two tours. The first was a smaller, mini-tour which took place in March 2013, three months before the album's release; the second tour takes place in autumn 2013. In 2012 Odell appeared as an opening act for Jake Bugg on the UK leg of his tour in November 2012.

== Reception ==
Professional ratings
Aggregate scores
Source	Rating
Metacritic	58/100
Review scores
Source	Rating
AllMusic	3.5/5 stars
Digital Spy	4/5 stars
The Guardian	3/5 stars
The Independent	1/5 stars
MusicOMH	4/5 stars
NME	0/10
The Observer	3/5 stars
PopMatters	3/10
The Telegraph	4/5 stars

Upon release, Long Way Down received mixed reviews from critics. On Metacritic, which assigns a rating out of 100, the album received an average score of 58 based on 14 reviews by mainstream critics.

NME gave the album 0 out of 10, prompting Odell's father to complain to the magazine.

In the spring of 2025, Odell's bonus track "Heal" from Long Way Down's deluxe edition came to prominence when American Idol season 23 contestant and eventual winner Jamal Roberts covered it during "Iconic Idol Moments" week and during the final episode. Jamal's gospel-soul rendition went viral on social media as his defining moment of the competition. Odell mentioned in a KTU 103.5 interview while discussing songwriting, storytelling and remixing that he had seen the video of Roberts' performance online and was inspired, saying: "It made me cry. He does this version of "Heal", a song that I wrote when I was 20 years old... and I watched this on YouTube... and for me... that is why I do this". Odell later gave his blessing to Roberts to release his version as a single. It reached #1 on Apple's ITunes Store top 100 on its release the week after Roberts' win.

Odell's version of "Heal" was featured as the ending credits song on the 2014 film If I Stay and its soundtrack. In an audio commentary on the soundtrack with WaterTower Music, director R. J. Cutler said the filmmakers needed a song to "help the audience transition from the intensity of the final moments of the film while also resonating lyrically and tonally with the story." He added, "for weeks we listened to songs trying to find the right one. We had almost given up... when our music department... came with bunch of new options. We listened, but it didn't work, and then we put on Tom Odell's "Heal". It was so perfect, I couldn't believe it". The song later appeared in the 2018 film The Miracle Season and television series such as The Vampire Diaries and 9-1-1.

== Track listing ==
All tracks written by Tom Odell (except where indicated) and produced by Dan Grech-Marguerat.

No.	Title	Writer(s)	Length
1.	"Grow Old with Me"		3:03
2.	"Hold Me"	Odell; Eg White	3:08
3.	"Another Love"		4:04
4.	"I Know"	Odell; Jonny Lattimer	3:52
5.	"Sense"	Odell; Eg White	4:24
6.	"Can't Pretend"		3:37
7.	"Till I Lost"		3:37
8.	"Supposed to Be"		3:33
9.	"Long Way Down"		2:29
10.	"Sirens"	Odell; Andy Burrows	3:41
Total length:			35:20

Deluxe edition bonus tracks
No.	Title	Writer(s)	Length
11.	"I Think It's Going to Rain Today"	Randy Newman	2:54
12.	"Storms"		3:08
13.	"Heal"	Odell	3:13
14.	"Till I Lost" (Demo)		4:23
15.	"Grow Old with Me" (Demo)		2:47

iTunes bonus tracks
No.	Title	Length
16.	"Supposed to Be Acoustic" (Video)	3:36

== Charts ==
=== Weekly charts ===
Weekly chart performance for Long Way Down
Chart (2013–2016)	Peak position
Australian Albums (ARIA)	66
Austrian Albums (Ö3 Austria)	48
Belgian Albums (Ultratop Flanders)	5
Belgian Albums (Ultratop Wallonia)	26
Danish Albums (Hitlisten)	36
Dutch Albums (Album Top 100)	1
French Albums (SNEP)	60
German Albums (Offizielle Top 100)	17
Irish Albums (IRMA)	5
New Zealand Albums (RMNZ)	39
Polish Albums (ZPAV)	31
Scottish Albums (Official Charts)	1
Swiss Albums (Schweizer Hitparade)	2
UK Albums (OCC)	1
US Billboard Folk Albums	12
US Billboard Heatseekers Albums	8

Chart (2024)	Peak position
Nigerian Albums (TurnTable)	86

Chart (2026)	Peak position
Greek Albums (IFPI)	34

=== Year-end charts ===
Year-end chart performance for Long Way Down
Chart	Year	Position
Dutch Albums (Album Top 100)	2021	78
Dutch Albums (Album Top 100)	2022	19
Dutch Albums (Album Top 100)	2023	31
Dutch Albums (Album Top 100)	2024	42
Dutch Albums (Album Top 100)	2025	55

== Certifications ==
Region	Certification	Certified units/sales
Denmark (IFPI Danmark)	Platinum	20,000^{‡}
Germany (BVMI)	Gold	100,000^{‡}
Netherlands (NVPI)	Platinum	40,000^{‡}
New Zealand (RMNZ)	Platinum	15,000^{‡}
Poland (ZPAV)	4× Platinum	80,000^{‡}
United Kingdom (BPI)	Platinum	300,000^{*}
^{*} Sales figures based on certification alone.^{‡} Sales+streaming figures based on certification alone.
