= Grow Old with Me (Tom Odell song) =

Single by Tom Odell

from the album Long Way Down
- Released: 13 September 2013
- Recorded: 2012
- Genre: Folk; indie pop
- Length: 3:05
- Label: Columbia; In the Name Of
- Songwriter(s): Tom Odell
- Producer(s): Dan Grech-Marguerat

Tom Odell singles chronology
"Hold Me" (2013)	"Grow Old with Me" (2013)	"I Know" (2013)

"Grow Old with Me" is a song by British singer-songwriter Tom Odell. The track was released in the United Kingdom on 13 September 2013 as the fourth single from Odell's debut studio album, Long Way Down (2013). It was also featured in the Reign episode "Dirty Laundry" (S1 E14).

== Track listing ==
Digital EP
No.	Title	Length
1.	"Grow Old with Me"	3:05
2.	"Make the Moment Last"	4:14
3.	"Little Darlin'"	2:04
4.	"Grow Old with Me" (KCRW MBE Session)	3:15

== Charts ==
Chart (2013)	Peak position
Belgium (Ultratip Bubbling Under Flanders)	3
UK Singles (Official Charts Company)	46

== Certifications ==
Region	Certification	Certified units/sales
United Kingdom (BPI)	Silver	200,000^{‡}
^{‡} Sales+streaming figures based on certification alone.
