= Can't Pretend =

Single by Tom Odell

from the album Long Way Down
- Released: 6 March 2013
- Recorded: 2012
- Genre: Soul; indie pop; indie rock
- Length: 3:42
- Label: Columbia
- Songwriter: Tom Odell

Tom Odell singles chronology
"Another Love" (2012)	"Can't Pretend" (2013)	"Hold Me" (2013)

"Can't Pretend" is the second single released by British singer-songwriter Tom Odell, from his debut studio album, Long Way Down (2013). The song was released in the United Kingdom as a digital download on 6 March 2013 and peaked at number 67 on the UK Singles Chart. It was used in the trailer "Desert" of the second season of The Newsroom, as well as The Blacklist episode "Milton Bobbit", Crisis episode "Found" and The 100 episode "Earth Skills".

== Live performances ==
On 23 February 2013 he performed the song live on British chat show The Jonathan Ross Show.

== Track listing ==
Digital download
No.	Title	Length
1.	"Can't Pretend"	3:42

== Charts ==
Chart (2013)	Peak position
Belgium (Ultratip Bubbling Under Flanders)	2
Belgium (Ultratip Bubbling Under Wallonia)	33
France (SNEP)	200
Iceland (Tonlist)	17
UK Singles (Official Charts)	67

== Certifications ==
Region	Certification	Certified units/sales
United Kingdom (BPI)	Silver	200,000^{‡}
^{‡} Sales+streaming figures based on certification alone.

== Release history ==
Region	Date	Format	Label
United Kingdom	6 March 2013	Digital download	Columbia
