= Hawking (band) =

Canadian progressive metal band

- Origin: Vancouver, British Columbia, Canada
- Genres: Progressive metal; progressive rock; alternative rock; post-hardcore
- Years active: 2013–present
- Labels: Independent
- Members: Tom Vanderkam; Saul Sitar; Noel Dufour
- Past members: Chartwell Kerr; Chris Young; Ben Klassen; Paul Engels
- Website: www.hawkingband.com

Hawking is a progressive metal band from Vancouver, British Columbia, Canada, composed of vocalists and guitarists Tom Vanderkam and Saul Sitar and drummer Noel Dufour.

== Musical style ==
The band's music is most broadly categorized as progressive metal. However, notable melodic hardcore, post-hardcore, symphonic metal and alternative rock influences are present in their work. The band's earlier work was often described as math rock or "math-pop", alluding to their use of interlocking guitar riffs and highly syncopated rhythms.

== History ==
=== Inception and the crash (2013) ===
Hawking embarked on their first tour of Western Canada in August 2013.

On August 26, 2013, the band was involved in a single vehicle accident as they were headed home from the final show of their Western Canadian tour, leaving all members of the band with injuries. Two of the group members, drummer Chartwell Kerr and bassist Paul Engels, were both airlifted to hospital in critical condition. Kerr sustained extensive damage to his legs. Engels suffered a severe head injury, and was in a coma for five weeks after the accident. He was unable to continue with the band. Chris Young replaced Engels on bass in February 2014.

=== Post-crash (2014) ===
During the summer months of 2014, the band completed a 50-date tour covering the Western USA and most of mainland Canada.

=== Hawking EP (2015) ===
Hawking released their debut self-titled EP independently on July 14, 2015. Reviews were largely positive given the band's emerging status. The band completed a 43-date North American tour in the months immediately following the release, and became known for maintaining a relentless touring schedule.

On August 26, 2016, the band released their single "Comfortable", completing a Canadian tour in support.

=== Diverge (2017) ===
Hawking released their full-length album Diverge on April 7, 2017, completing a North American tour in support. In the fall of 2017, they completed a Western Canadian tour with Ninjaspy and The Body Politic.

=== Present (2018–present) ===
In the fall of 2018, Hawking completed a Western Canadian tour with Youth Fountain.

In the spring of 2019, Hawking completed a Western Canadian tour. In the fall of 2019, the band completed a 28-date North American tour supporting Stellar Circuits.

On January 31, 2020, Hawking released their single “Never Bow”.

On March 20, 2020, Hawking released their single “Elucidate, Articulate”.

On March 18, 2022, Hawking released their single “A Tragedy (This Melody)”.

Noel Dufour replaced Chartwell Kerr on drums in 2023.

In August, 2024, Hawking completed a Western Canadian co-headlining tour with Cliffside.

== Band members ==
=== Current ===
- Tom Vanderkam - Lead Vocals, Guitar
- Saul Sitar - Vocals, Lead Guitar
- Noel Dufour - Drums

=== Former ===
- Chartwell Kerr - Vocals, Drums
- Ben Klassen - Vocals, Lead Guitar
- Chris Young - Bass
- Paul Engels - Vocals, Bass

== Other appearances ==
Hawking appears in the film Midnight Sun (2016).

Frontman Tom Vanderkam appears in the film Deadpool (2016).

Vanderkam and former lead guitarist Ben Klassen appeared in the film If I Stay (2014).

Vanderkam works as a researcher at The University of British Columbia Department of Psychology. He is affiliated with Dr. Peter Suedfeld, a Holocaust survivor who researches psychological resilience.

Vanderkam owned and operated an independent booking agency, Badmouth Booking.

== Discography ==
- A Tragedy (This Melody) (Single) (2022)
- Elucidate, Articulate (Single) (2020)
- Never Bow (Single) (2020)
- Diverge (2017)

01. Catalyst
02. Broken Glass
03. Homesick
04. Lying Through Your Teeth
05. Stepping Stone
06. Comfortable
07. Disclosure
08. North of the Black Sea
09. Haunted House
10. Outside
11. Leave You Behind

- Comfortable (Single) (2016)
- Hawking EP (2015)

01. Safe and Sound
02. Cold Hands
03. Books on Tape
04. Diastole
05. Systole
