= Wrong Crowd (song) =

Single by Tom Odell

from the album Wrong Crowd
- Released: 4 April 2016
- Genre: Indietronica
- Length: 4:27
- Label: RCA Records
- Songwriters: Tom Odell; Rick Nowels

Tom Odell singles chronology
"Real Love" (2014)	"Wrong Crowd" (2016)	"Magnetised" (2016)

"Wrong Crowd" is a song by British singer-songwriter Tom Odell and the first single from his second studio album of the same name. It was released digitally on 4 April 2016. Odell had previously debuted the song live at a show in Cologne, Germany in 2015, but did not formally announce its title until early 2016, when he teased the release of the single through social media.

== Music video ==
The music video for "Wrong Crowd" was released along with the single on 4 April 2016. It was directed by George Belfield and filmed in South Africa. The video begins with Odell watching a video of himself singing "Constellations", a track from his upcoming album, to a woman. As the music begins, Odell is seen lounging in his hotel room, drinking alone and getting dressed for the evening. Later shots in the video show Odell partying in a nightclub, surrounded by people and being showered with champagne.

== Live performances ==
Odell premiered the song for the first time at a show during the C/O Pop Festival in Cologne in 2015. On 4 April 2016, Odell announced that he would be going on tour, performing at venues in Europe and the United States in support of both the song and upcoming album.

== Track listing ==
Digital download
No.	Title	Length
1.	"Wrong Crowd"	4:27

== Release date ==
Region	Date	Format	Label
United Kingdom	4 April 2016	Digital download	RCA Records
