= The Perks of Being a Wallflower (soundtrack) =

2012 film soundtrack

The Perks of Being a Wallflower (Original Motion Picture Soundtrack)

Soundtrack album by Various Artists
- Released: September 11, 2012
- Genres: Pop; rock; jazz; R&B
- Length: 51:58
- Label: Atlantic
- Compilers: Alexandra Patsavas; Stephen Chbosky

The Perks of Being a Wallflower (Original Motion Picture Score)

Film score by Michael Brook
- Released: September 25, 2012
- Genre: Film score
- Length: 23:45
- Label: Lakeshore
- Producer: Michael Brook

Michael Brook chronology
Undefeated (2011)	The Perks of Being a Wallflower (2012)	Cas and Dylan (2013)

The soundtrack to the 2012 coming-of-age drama film The Perks of Being a Wallflower, written, directed and based on the 1999 novel of the same name by Stephen Chbosky, features a selection of pop, rock and jazz compilations by various artists, handpicked by Chbosky and music supervisor Alexandra Patsavas. The album was marketed and released by Atlantic Records on September 11, 2012, in digital platforms, CD and vinyl. Michael Brook composed the film's incidental underscore, published by Lakeshore Records on September 25, that featured nine tracks.

Other songs not included in soundtrack included "Here" (Pavement), "Don't Dream It's Over" (Crowded House) and "Pretend We're Dead" (L7).

== Background ==
"I've shared them with friends. And they have shared their favorites with me. Some of the songs are popular. Some of them are not known by a whole lot of people. But they are all great in their own way. And since these songs have meant a lot to me, I just wanted you to have them as a soundtrack for whatever you need them to be for your life."

— Stephen Chbosky

Chbosky said music was one of the important factors of the film, while already adding that he did not use songs from his teenage life, but also modern songs, and called it "the biggest delight in making the film". In his discussion with Pastavas, Chboksy had said that "the soundtrack is basically our mix tape back and forth. She brought in a lot of songs, I brought in a lot of songs, and then Jennifer Nash our music editor, she contributed, and it all came together. Yeah, I love that music and to their credit". Summit Entertainment also paid them for licensing those songs into the film, following the audience response to the songs. Chbosky further added that "A lot of the music made it into the movie, but there are some surprises from the era that we included too".

A number of songs were featured in the book as well, including the Smiths' "Asleep" and songs from The Rocky Horror Picture Show. He was initially nervous on using those tracks, as "it is so important to the movie and the book, and the Smiths could have asked for the moon and we probably would have given it to them but they didn't. When they realized how important it was, they gave us the song for well, I can't say how much but they just got into the spirit of it and people seemed enthusiastic about being a part of this." The track "Your Ex-Lover Is Dead" from Stars, for the tunnel sequence, while for the first kiss between Charlie and Sam, he used the song "Samson" by Regina Spektor. He added that "the longing of these songs reminded me of the longing of that time".

In his book, "Landslide" by Fleetwood Mac is listened to by the kids when they go through the tunnel. However, in the film, Chbosky used the David Bowie single "'Heroes'". Chbosky said "Landslide" is a "very soft ballad", and he felt that "the problem was when we got to the tunnel scene I just thought, 'We need something that's not soft. We need something that's driving, that's epic in nature', and 'Heroes' was a perfect fit." In one sequence, when Sam and Charlie attend the dance, the former hears Dexys Midnight Runners' single "Come On Eileen" and says, "They're playing good music". Chbosky called it "one of the greatest dance songs" and said, "If you really think about it, if you play that at a wedding or anything, you'll get people dancing at the most bogus events, that's what she means. I love that song and it's [one of] my favorite songs from the '80s." The single "It's Time" from Imagine Dragons was featured in the trailer but was not included in the soundtrack.

== Critical reception ==
The music received critical acclaim. Calling it "a soundtrack that added to its authenticity and emotional impact", Heather Phares of AllMusic wrote, "With mixtape-like intimacy, the album echoes the connections between the film's characters, but that heartfelt vibe reaches listeners as well." Claire White, in her analysis for Junkee Media, said, "No film quite understands the power of music during your teen years quite like The Perks of Being a Wallflower". Writing for The New Zealand Herald, Kim Gillespie gave a 4/5 rating to the soundtrack and said, "This album does what a good soundtrack should do, and takes you there". Afterglow's Myah Taylor said "the music in 'Perks' is handpicked just for the wallflower. Its songs put words and images to his spectrum of emotions, helping move the story along in a way that people can understand and relate to." Dan Jolin of Empire called the soundtrack "inherently superior".

Daily Collegian's review of the film, written by Rachel Arlin, stated, "The soundtrack complements the film very well. There are a few indie songs, but the majority of them are about teenage rebellion." Kevin Jagernauth of IndieWire wrote that "the music, with a carefully curated soundtrack by Alexandra Patsavas, ... hits the necessary emotional cues while never overselling them". The Linc wrote, "The soundtrack to the film is also a bonus for avid music fans, including songs from The Smiths, David Bowie and Sonic Youth that suited the film being based in the '90s." In a contrasting review, Rex Reed of Observer wrote, "The soundtrack is so drenched in bubblegum pop that it sounds like an iTunes library". Ty Burr of Boston.com wrote, "The soundtrack's impeccable playlist of '80s indie-rock classics seems more the choice of a writer in his early 40s than teenagers in the 1990s".

Several publications such as MTV, Den of Geek, IndieWire, Film School Rejects, Fact and Entertainment Weekly, called The Perks of Being a Wallflower one of the "best soundtracks 2012". /Film, Insider Inc., IndieWire and Screen Rant included it among their "best soundtracks of the decade". Harper's Bazaar and Thrillist listed it as one of their "best movie soundtracks of all time". Ray Rahman, editorial assistant to Entertainment Weekly, said "It's Time" was one of "his most played songs of 2012" after the song was featured in the film's trailer.

== Track listing ==
=== Soundtrack ===
The Perks of Being a Wallflower (Original Motion Picture Soundtrack)
No.	Title	Music	Length
1.	"Could It Be Another Change?"	The Samples	3:27
2.	"Come On Eileen"	Dexys Midnight Runners	4:12
3.	"Tugboat"	Galaxie 500	3:54
4.	"Temptation"	New Order	5:22
5.	"Evensong"	The Innocence Mission	3:40
6.	"Asleep"	The Smiths	4:10
7.	"Low"	Cracker	4:34
8.	"Teen Age Riot"	Sonic Youth	6:57
9.	"Dear God"	XTC	3:36
10.	"Pearly-Dewdrops' Drops"	Cocteau Twins	4:10
11.	"Charlie's Last Letter"	Michael Brook	1:48
12.	"'Heroes'"	David Bowie	6:08
Total length:			51:58

=== Score ===
All music is composed by Michael Brook.

The Perks of Being a Wallflower (Original Score)
No.	Title	Length
1.	"First Day"	2:32
2.	"Home Again"	1:40
3.	"Charlie Speaks"	2:03
4.	"Candace"	1:46
5.	"Charlie's Gifts"	0:55
6.	"Kiss Breakdown"	5:12
7.	"Acid"	3:12
8.	"Charlies First Kiss"	3:34
9.	"Shard"	2:47
Total length:		23:45

== Charts ==
=== Weekly charts ===
Chart (2012–2013)	Peak position
UK Compilation Albums (OCC)	90
UK Soundtrack Albums (OCC)	8
US Top Rock Albums (Billboard)	40
US Top Soundtracks (Billboard)	7
