= Best Day of My Life (album) =

2022 studio album by Tom Odell

Studio album by Tom Odell
- Released: 28 October 2022
- Length: 29:25
- Label: UROK; Mtheory
- Producer: Tom Odell; Laurie Blundell; Max Clilverd

Tom Odell chronology
Monsters (2021)	Best Day of My Life (2022)	Black Friday (2024)

Singles from Best Day of My Life
- 1. "Best Day of My Life" Released: 30 March 2022; 2. "Sad Anymore" Released: 27 May 2022; 3. "Flying" Released: 15 July 2022; 4. "Smiling All the Way Back Home" Released: 8 September 2022

Best Day of My Life is the fifth studio album by British singer-songwriter Tom Odell. It was released on 28 October 2022 through UROK Management and Mtheory. The lead single of the same name, "Best Day of My Life", was released on 30 March 2022. The album debuted at number seven on the UK Albums Chart, becoming Odell's fifth Top 10 album in the UK.

== Background ==
The album marks Odell's first album as an independent artist, after parting ways with Columbia Records in 2021, giving him "freedom and creative control". On 30 March 2022, he released the album's first single of the same name, followed by "Sad Anymore" on 27 May 2022 and "Flying" on 15 July 2022.

Odell officially announced the album on 8 September 2022, and released the album's fourth single, "Smiling All the Way Back Home". In the announcement, Odell writes, "One year ago, almost exactly to the day, I set myself the challenge to write and record an entire album using only my voice and my piano with absolutely nothing else. I found myself digging deeper than I ever have before both with my words and piano playing."

== Reception ==
Professional ratings
Review scores
Source	Rating
Clash	8/10
The i Paper	3/5 stars

Writing for Renowned for Sound, Ryan Bulbeck describes the album as "a complete juxtaposition to his last full-length album, but is also on somewhat familiar ground to fans of his earlier work." Bulbeck applauds the album saying it "showcases Tom's writing brilliantly, especially his melody and lyrical talents, and one that, although a single level throughout, doesn't overstay its welcome."

James Mellen of Clash depicts Best Day of My Life as "haunting, raw and candid, serving as a dream-like collection of songs from one of the UK's greatest songwriting talents." Reviewing the album for The i Paper, Kate Solomon admits that the record is "a very strange and beautiful album, but there does come a point where the undulating piano and wobbling vocals start to bleed into one another; there's not a great deal holding the songs apart."

== Track listing ==
Credits adapted from Tidal.

Best Day of My Life track listing
No.	Title	Writer(s)	Length
1.	"Best Day of My Life"	Laurie Blundell; Tom Odell	2:27
2.	"Sad Anymore"	Blundell; Odell	2:10
3.	"Sunrise"	Blundell; Odell	1:06
4.	"Just Another Thing We Don't Talk About"	Max Clilverd; Odell	3:39
5.	"The Blood We Bleed"	Blundell; Sam Johnson; Odell	2:50
6.	"Giving a Fuck"	Blundell; Odell	2:45
7.	"Librium"	Blundell; Odell	1:22
8.	"Flying"	Blundell; Odell	2:59
9.	"Enemy"	Blundell; Odell	3:06
10.	"Monday"	Blundell; Odell	2:53
11.	"Sunset"	Blundell; Odell	1:06
12.	"Smiling All the Way Back Home"	Blundell; Rick Nowels; Odell	3:52
Total length:			29:25

== Charts ==
Chart performance for Best Day of My Life
Chart (2022)	Peak position
Belgian Albums (Ultratop Flanders)	185
Swiss Albums (Schweizer Hitparade)	29
UK Albums (OCC)	7
