= A Wonderful Life (Tom Odell album) =

Studio album by Tom Odell
- Released: 5 September 2025
- Label: UROK
- Producer: Tom Odell; Cityfall

Tom Odell chronology
Black Friday (2024)	A Wonderful Life (2025)

Singles from A Wonderful Life
- 1. "Don't Let Me Go" Released: 25 April 2025; 2. "Don't Cry, Put Your Head On My Shoulder" Released: 23 May 2025; 3. "Ugly" Released: 8 August 2025

A Wonderful Life is the seventh studio album by British singer-songwriter Tom Odell. It was released on 5 September 2025 through UROK Management and Virgin Music.

== Background and composition ==
A Wonderful Life was recorded in London at Church Studios, HOXA, and Room One at RAK Studios. Odell chose to record with a live band setup in order to achieve a "more organic sound." The album comprises ten tracks, all written by Odell in collaboration with Laurie Blundell, with additional contributions from Max Clilverd and Josefina Proto. Production was handled by Odell alongside Cityfall. He described the album as a response to the "overwhelming" negative news that had dominated the world in recent years.

“There’s been this sense, almost every week, that the world is ending in some capacity—which it is, for some people, [...] Much of the record channels despair, frustration and helplessness, but also the possibility of hope."

— Odell for the album press release, via Noise11

== Promotion ==
The album spawned three singles. "Don't Let Me Go", released on 25 April 2025, served as the album lead single. It was followed by "Don't Cry, Put Your Head On My Shoulder" as the album second single on 23 May 25, and "Ugly" as the third official single on 8 August 2025.

The album was re-issued on 10 October 2025, under the title A Wonderful Life (Epilogue) featuring two brand-new tracks.

To promote the album, Odell embarked on a global tour spanning 2025 and 2026, with scheduled dates across Oceania, Europe, and North America.

== Track listing ==
A Wonderful Life tracklist
No.	Title	Writer(s)	Producer(s)	Length
1.	"Don't Let Me Go"	Tom Odell; Laurie Blundell	Tom Odell; Cityfall	4:52
2.	"Don't Cry, Put Your Head On My Shoulder"	Odell; Blundell; Max Clilverd	Odell; Cityfall	3:51
3.	"Prayer"	Odell; Blundell	Odell; Cityfall	4:32
4.	"Can We Just Go Home Now"	Odell; Blundell	Odell; Cityfall	2:53
5.	"Why Do I Always Want The Things That I Can't Have"	Odell; Blundell	Odell; Cityfall	3:41
6.	"Wonderful Life"	Odell; Blundell	Odell; Cityfall	3:48
7.	"Ugly"	Odell; Blundell; Josefina Proto	Odell; Cityfall	4:30
8.	"Strange House"	Odell	Odell; Cityfall	2:52
9.	"Can Old Lovers Ever Just Be Friends?"	Odell; Blundell	Odell; Cityfall	3:58
10.	"The End of Suffering"	Odell; Blundell	Odell; Cityfall	4:11
Total length:				39:13

A Wonderful Life (Epilogue) tracklist
No.	Title	Writer(s)	Producer(s)	Length
1.	"When I Close My Eyes"	Odell; Blundell; Jonny Coffer	Odell; Cityfall	3:13
2.	"It's The Morning After Last Night's Rain"	Odell; Blundell	Odell; Cityfall	3:27
Total length:				45:54

== Personnel ==
Credits adapted from Tidal.

- Tom Odell — vocals, songwriter, producer (all tracks)
- Laurie Blundell — songwriter (1-7; 9-10)
- Cityfall — producer (all tracks)
- Max Clilverd — songwriter (track 2)
- Josefina Proto — songwriter (track 7)

== Charts ==
Chart performance for A Wonderful Life
Chart (2025)	Peak position
Austrian Albums (Ö3 Austria)	8
Belgian Albums (Ultratop Flanders)	5
Belgian Albums (Ultratop Wallonia)	6
Dutch Albums (Album Top 100)	4
German Albums (Offizielle Top 100)	9
Polish Albums (ZPAV)	84
Scottish Albums (OCC)	9
Spanish Albums (PROMUSICAE)	100
Swiss Albums (Schweizer Hitparade)	36
UK Albums (OCC)	12

== Release history ==
A Wonderful Life release history
Region	Date	Format(s)	Label	Version	Ref.
Various	5 September 2025	CD; vinyl; digital download; streaming	UROK; Virgin Music	Standard	
Various	10 October 2025	CD; vinyl; digital download; streaming	UROK; Virgin Music	Epilogue	
