= Jubilee Road =

Studio album by Tom Odell
- Released: 26 October 2018
- Studio: Miloco Studios, London; Sear Studios, New York; Strongroom Studios, London
- Genre: Indie pop
- Length: 46:46
- Label: Columbia Records
- Producer: Ben Baptie; Andrew Burrows; Tom Odell; Martin Terefe

Tom Odell chronology
Spending All My Christmas with You (2016)	Jubilee Road (2018)	Monsters (2021)

Tom Odell studio album chronology
Wrong Crowd (2016)	Jubilee Road (2018)	Monsters (2021)

Singles from Jubilee Road
- 1. "If You Wanna Love Somebody" Released: 14 June 2018; 2. "Half as Good as You" Released: 24 August 2018; 3. "Go Tell Her Now" Released: 25 January 2019

Professional ratings
Review scores
Source	Rating
Express & Star	6/10 stars
PopMatters	6/10 stars
Varsity	2/5 stars
The National Student	4/5 stars
Irish News	4/10

Jubilee Road is the third studio album by British singer-songwriter Tom Odell. It was released on 26 October 2018. The lead single "If You Wanna Love Somebody" was released on 14 June 2018.

== Background ==
The album was announced on 22 June 2018. The songwriting was inspired by Odell's neighbours while living in a terraced street in east London. He said about this period: “At the time I was actually thinking about taking a break from music, I was thinking about stepping back for six months, but then I moved into this house and just felt inspired by the neighbours and the community I was living in and actually wrote the album pretty quickly.” Besides the neighbourhood Odell drew inspiration from his own life as well: “The best way I can describe it is there are some characters in some of the songs – in Son of an Only Child I imagine this babysitter with this young boy and then the young boy’s older and he’s part of this lost generation and he feels angry. In another song ["Queen of Diamonds"] there's this gambling addict who is desperately gambling to try and satisfy his own addiction but also someone else because he thinks it's going to save him. In all of them they're partly things I’ve observed but also they're partly myself as well and partly things I’ve witnessed and experienced.”

== Promotion ==
The lead single "If You Wanna Love Somebody" and its video were both released on 14 June 2018. The video was directed by Sophie Littman. Odell also performed the song on The Graham Norton Show on the day of the release. The second single "Half As Good As You" featuring German-English singer Alice Merton was released on 24 August 2018. The clip was again directed by Littman. Odell performed the duet with Merton on The Voice of Poland and with Rae Morris on The Jonathan Ross Show. Other album tracks that were released in advance of the release included the title track "Jubilee Road" as well as "You're Gonna Break My Heart Tonight" and "Go Tell Her Now". The accompanying Jubilee Road Tour started on 12 October 2018. The tour involves gigs in the UK, Europe and the United States.

== Track listing ==
Credits adapted from the album booklet.

No.	Title	Writer(s)	Producer(s)	Length
1.	"Jubilee Road"	Tom Odell; Andrew Burrows	Tom Odell; Ben Baptie	5:13
2.	"If You Wanna Love Somebody"	Odell	Odell; Baptie	4:22
3.	"Son of an Only Child"	Odell	Odell; Baptie	4:35
4.	"You're Gonna Break My Heart Tonight"	Odell	Odell; Baptie	4:38
5.	"China Dolls"	Odell	Odell; Baptie	4:00
6.	"Queen of Diamonds"	Odell	Odell; Baptie	3:34
7.	"Half as Good as You"	Odell	Odell; Andrew Burrows; Baptie	3:30
8.	"Go Tell Her Now"	Odell; Jonny Lattimer	Odell; Baptie	3:51
9.	"Don't Belong in Hollywood"	Odell	Odell; Baptie	3:55
10.	"Wedding Day"	Odell	Odell; Baptie	4:16
11.	"If You Wanna Love Somebody" (single version)	Odell	Odell; Martin Terefe; Baptie	3:54
Total length:				46:46

== Personnel ==
Credits are adapted from Jubilee Road liner notes.

- Tom Odell – vocals, piano, organ (track 2, 11), backing vocals (track 2, 8, 9), clicks (track 3), strings (track 11)
- Max Clilverd – electric guitar (track 1–5, 7–9, 11), acoustic guitar (track 2–5, 7–11), backing vocals (track 8), dulcimer (track 10)
- Max Goff – bass guitar (track 1–5, 7–9, 11)
- Andrew Burrows – drums (track 1–5, 7–9, 11), percussion (track 1, 5, 7), glockenspiel (track 2, 11), backing vocals (track 2, 8)
- Ben Baptie – tambourine (track 2)
- Michael Leonhart – trumpet (track 3)
- Dave Guy – trumpet (track 3)
- Maneco Ruiz – trumpet (track 3)
- Mike Davis – trombone (track 3)
- Matt Bauder – tenor sax (track 4)
- Debbie Aramide – backing vocals (track 3, 5)
- Olivia Wiliams – backing vocals (track 3, 5)
- Emily Holligan – backing vocals (track 3, 5)
- Joel Frahm – saxophone (track 4)
- Alice Merton – vocals (track 7)

=== Design ===
- Tom Odell – creative direction
- Margherita Visconti – creative direction
- Frank Fieber – creative direction
- Joanna Weir – photography commissioning
- Chris Norris – design
- Sophie Green – photography
- Joe Magowan – additional photography
- Rianna Tamara – additional photography
- Aava Anttinen – additional photography
- Jonny Isaacson – additional design
- Helen Frost – additional design
- Kiran Mistry – additional design

=== Technical ===
- Tom Odell – production, arrangements
- Ben Baptie – production, engineering, mixing (track 1, 3–10)
- Tom Archer – recording assistant engineer (track 1, 3–6, 8–11)
- Andy Menhenitt – mixing assistant engineer (track 1–10), recording assistant engineer(track 2, 7)
- Ted Jensen – mastering
- Michael Leonhart – arrangements
- Andrew Burrows – production (track 7)
- Oli Barton-Wood – engineering (track 7)
- Martin Terefe – production (track 11)
- Mark "Spike" Stent – mixing (track 11)

== Charts ==
Chart (2018)	Peak position
Austrian Albums (Ö3 Austria)	53
Belgian Albums (Ultratop Flanders)	56
Belgian Albums (Ultratop Wallonia)	126
Dutch Albums (Album Top 100)	30
German Albums (Offizielle Top 100)	66
Irish Albums (IRMA)	27
Polish Albums (ZPAV)	44
Scottish Albums (OCC)	5
Swiss Albums (Schweizer Hitparade)	20
UK Albums (OCC)	5
