= Wrong Crowd =

Studio album by Tom Odell
- Released: 10 June 2016
- Genre: Indie pop; indietronica
- Length: 47:03
- Label: RCA
- Producer: Tom Odell; Jim Abbiss; Inflo

Tom Odell chronology
Long Way Down (2013)	Wrong Crowd (2016)	Spending All My Christmas with You (2016)

Tom Odell studio album chronology
Long Way Down (2013)	Wrong Crowd (2016)	Jubilee Road (2018)

Singles from Wrong Crowd
- 1. "Wrong Crowd" Released: 4 April 2016; 2. "Magnetised" Released: 15 April 2016; 3. "Here I Am" Released: 20 May 2016; 4. "Concrete" Released: 7 June 2016; 5. "Silhouette" Released: 9 December 2016

Wrong Crowd is the second studio album by British singer-songwriter Tom Odell. It was released on 10 June 2016. Odell's first major release since his 2013 debut, Long Way Down, achieved international success, it was also his first album released via RCA Records.

== Background ==
The album was announced on 4 April 2016, along with the release of its lead single, "Wrong Crowd". Odell also released a music video for the song on the same date, in addition to the announcement of a new tour. The album, released on 10 June 2016, was co-produced by Odell alongside Jim Abbiss, who has previously worked with artists like Arctic Monkeys, Kasabian and Adele. Regarding the concept and production of the new album, Odell said,

I wanted the songs to sound big and dramatic; big strings and melodies emphasizing the songs further – rich in musicality and holding nothing back. The album follows a narrative of a man held at ransom by his childhood, yearning for it, yearning for nature- a desire for innocence in this perverse world in which he now lives. It’s a fictional story but the emotions and feelings are obviously ones I have felt – though the stories are elaborated and exaggerated. I wanted to create a world with a heightened sense of reality.

== Promotion ==
On 4 April 2016, Odell announced that he would go on tour and perform a series of intimate shows at venues across Europe and the United States in support of the album. Tickets for his shows, titled the No Bad Days Tour, completely sold out.

== Reception ==
Professional ratings
Aggregate scores
Source	Rating
Metacritic	72/100
Review scores
Source	Rating
AllMusic	4/5 stars
The Arts Desk	3/5 stars
Clash	7/10 stars
The Irish Times	3/5 stars
Gigslutz	4/5 stars
Mondo Sonoro	6/10 stars

Wrong Crowd received generally positive reviews from music critics, who highlighted Odell's vocal performance as well as the album's blend of piano-driven ballads and more upbeat, pop-influenced tracks. According to the review aggregator Metacritic, Wrong Crowd received "generally favorable reviews" based on a weighted average score of 72 out of 100 from 5 critic scores.

== Track listing ==
Credits adapted from the album booklet.

No.	Title	Writer(s)	Producer(s)	Length
1.	"Wrong Crowd"	Odell; Rick Nowels	Odell; Jim Abbiss	4:27
2.	"Magnetised"	Odell; Nowels	Odell; Abbiss; Nowels	3:57
3.	"Concrete"	Odell	Odell; Inflo	3:49
4.	"Constellations"	Odell; Andy Burrows	Odell; Abbiss	4:36
5.	"Sparrow"	Odell	Odell; Abbiss	4:56
6.	"Still Getting Used to Being on My Own"	Odell; Nowels	Odell; Abbiss	3:03
7.	"Silhouette"	Odell; Jamie Scott	Odell; Abbiss	4:47
8.	"Jealousy"	Odell	Odell; Abbiss	3:49
9.	"Daddy"	Odell	Odell; Abbiss	3:18
10.	"Here I Am"	Odell; Burrows	Odell; Abbiss	3:29
11.	"Somehow"	Odell	Odell; Inflo	6:52

Deluxe edition (additional tracks)
No.	Title	Writer(s)	Producer(s)	Length
12.	"She Don't Belong to Me"	Odell; Nowels	Odell; Abbiss	3:58
13.	"Mystery"	Odell; Nowels	Odell; Abbiss	4:24
14.	"Entertainment"	Odell	Odell; Rich Cooper	3:30
15.	"I Thought I Knew What Love Was"	Odell	Odell; Cooper	3:46

== Charts and certifications ==
=== Weekly charts ===
Chart (2016)	Peak position
Australian Albums (ARIA)	29
Austrian Albums (Ö3 Austria)	35
Belgian Albums (Ultratop Flanders)	13
Belgian Albums (Ultratop Wallonia)	36
Czech Albums (ČNS IFPI)	17
Dutch Albums (Album Top 100)	9
French Albums (SNEP)	89
German Albums (Offizielle Top 100)	16
Irish Albums (IRMA)	6
Italian Albums (FIMI)	45
New Zealand Heatseekers Albums (RMNZ)	6
Polish Albums (ZPAV)	15
Scottish Albums (OCC)	2
Spanish Albums (Promusicae)	50
Swedish Albums (Sverigetopplistan)	58
Swiss Albums (Schweizer Hitparade)	2
UK Albums (OCC)	2
UK Album Downloads (OCC)	2
US Heatseekers Albums (Billboard)	8
US Top Rock Albums (Billboard)	48

=== Year-end charts ===
Chart (2016)	Position
UK Albums (OCC)	88

=== Certifications ===
Certifications for Wrong Crowd
Region	Certification	Certified units/sales
United Kingdom (BPI)	Gold	100,000^{‡}
^{‡} Sales+streaming figures based on certification alone.

== Release date ==
Region	Date	Format	Label
United Kingdom	10 June 2016	Digital download	RCA Records
