= Monsters (Tom Odell album) =

Studio album by Tom Odell
- Released: 9 July 2021
- Studio: Hoxa HQ; Sleeper Sounds; Konk; The Cabin; Apogee LA; Echo Zoo; RAK; Rick Nowels' studio
- Length: 43:22
- Label: Columbia
- Producer: Laurie Blundell; Miles James; Tom Odell

Tom Odell chronology
Jubilee Road (2018)	Monsters (2021)	Best Day of My Life (2022)

Professional ratings
Review scores
Source	Rating
The Arts Desk	3/5 stars
Evening Standard	4/5 stars
The Line of Best Fit	7/10
NME	2/5 stars
The Times	2/5 stars

Monsters (stylized in all lowercase) is the fourth studio album by British singer-songwriter Tom Odell. It was released on 9 July 2021. Its lead single, "Numb", was released on 19 February 2021. The album debuted at number four on the UK Albums Chart, becoming Odell's fourth Top 10s.

== Promotion ==
The lead single "Numb" was released the day after the premiere of the music video which was released on 18 February 2021. The video was directed by Tom Odell and Joseph Delaney. The second single from the record was "Monster V.1". Its music video was directed by Tom Odell and Georgie Sommerville and was released on 12 March 2021. On 31 March 2021, Odell released the music video for the third single of the album, "Monster V.2", which served as a collaboration with his fans. "Money" was released as the fourth single; its music video was released on 12 May 2021 and was directed by Georgie Somerville. The fifth single from Monsters was the song "Lose You Again" and the music video was directed by Charlie Lightening.

== Track listing ==
Monsters track listing
No.	Title	Writer(s)	Length
1.	"Numb"	Tom Odell; Arrow Benjamin; Laurie Blundell; Jonathan Coffer	2:33
2.	"Over You Yet"	Odell; Blundell; Coffer	3:38
3.	"Noise"	Odell; Rick Nowels	1:38
4.	"Money"	Odell; Blundell; Eric Lieber	2:56
5.	"Tears That Never Dry"	Odell; Max Clilverd	3:24
6.	"Monster V.2"	Odell; Courtney Marie Andrews; Nowels; Blundell	2:19
7.	"Lockdown"	Odell; Blundell; Miles James	1:56
8.	"Lose You Again"	Odell; Blundell	3:07
9.	"Fighting Fire with Fire"	Odell; Blundell; Coffer; Wayne Hector; Miles	2:39
10.	"Problems"	Odell; Blundell; James; Miles	0:39
11.	"Me and My Friends"	Odell; Blundell; Coffer; James; Matthew Koma; Miles; Nowels	2:33
12.	"Country Star"	Odell	1:36
13.	"By This Time Tomorrow"	Odell; Blundell	2:45
14.	"Streets of Heaven"	Odell; Andrews; Nowels	3:00
15.	"Don't Be Afraid of the Dark"	Odell; Andrews	6:07
16.	"Monster V.1"	Odell; Andrews; Blundell; Nowels	2:25
Total length:			43:22

=== Note ===
- All track titles are stylized in all lowercase.

== Personnel ==
Credits adapted from the album's liner notes and Tidal.

- Tom Odell – vocals, production (all tracks); piano (tracks 1, 6, 8, 9, 11, 13–15), vocoder (3), guitar (5, 11), bass (6, 15), background vocals (11), percussion (12)
- Laurie Blundell – production (1–13, 16), synthesizer (1, 2, 5–8, 13), bass (2–5, 10), piano (2, 4, 9), mixing (2, 6–8, 16), drums (5, 7, 10), strings (8), vocoder (9); background vocals, percussion (11)
- Miles James – production (1–13, 16), bass (1, 2, 7, 9, 11), drums (1, 2, 4–6, 9, 15), mixing (2), percussion (3), piano (9), background vocals (11)
- Christoph Skirl – engineering (1, 2, 4–9, 11, 15, 16)
- Dave Kutch – mastering
- Rob Kinelski – mixing (1, 4, 9, 11)
- Casey Cuayo – additional mixing assistance (1, 4, 9, 11)
- Eli Heisler – additional mixing assistance (1, 4, 9, 11)
- Ben Baptie – mixing (5, 13, 15)
- Tom Archer – mixing assistance (5, 13, 15)
- Max Clilverd – guitar (5)
- Fryars – additional production (6, 16)
- Digi – additional production (6)
- Couros Sheibani –production, programming (8)
- Mark "Spike" Stent – mixing (8)
- Matt Wolach – mixing assistance (8)
- Ed Farrell – engineering (10), co-engineering (6, 16)
- Rick Nowels – production (14)
- Dean Reid – mixing (14)
- John Christopher Fee – mixing assistance (14)

== Charts ==
Chart performance of Monsters
Chart (2021)	Peak position
Belgian Albums (Ultratop Flanders)	195
Irish Albums (OCC)	35
Scottish Albums (OCC)	3
Swiss Albums (Schweizer Hitparade)	43
UK Albums (OCC)	4
