= Black Friday (Tom Odell album) =

Studio album by Tom Odell
- Released: 26 January 2024
- Length: 28:34
- Label: UROK
- Producer: Tom Odell; Cityfall

Tom Odell chronology
| Best Day of My Life (2022) | Black Friday (2024) | A Wonderful Life (2025) |

Singles from Black Friday
- 1. "Black Friday" Released: 22 September 2023; 2. "Somebody Else" Released: 13 October 2023; 3. "Answer Phone" Released: 17 November 2023; 4. "The End" Released: 22 December 2023

Black Friday is the sixth studio album by British singer-songwriter Tom Odell. It was released on 26 January 2024 through UROK Management. The title track "Black Friday" was nominated for the Ivor Novello Award for Best Song Musically and Lyrically on Thursday 23 May 2024.

== Background ==
Recording took place at Odell's studio in London, mainly consisting of him "just sitting on the sofa" with his guitar and recording vocals in order to "capture" what they were trying to capture since other methods did not work. According to Odell, this procedure was directly inspired by the way Kurt Cobain would record music. The eponymous track, released as the lead single on 22 September 2023, was written on his 32nd birthday in 2022 and deals with "admiration and love for the people" in his life as well as the "proclivity to be unkind" to himself. "Black Friday" was followed-up by the singles "Somebody Else", "Answer Phone" and "The End".

== Critical reception ==
Professional ratings
Review scores
| Source | Rating |
|---|---|
| Clash | 7/10 |
| Laut.de | 4/5 stars |
| The Times | 2/5 stars |

Writing for Laut.de, Josephine Maria Bayer thought Black Friday was neither "monotonous" nor "predictable" with Odell surpassing himself as a songwriter and arranger. Emma Harrison at Clash noted that Odell takes him and the listener "on an emotional and intimate journey" with moments that are "enthralling" and some that are "a bit too melancholy and a smidge lacklustre". Being more critical of the record, Will Hodgkinson of The Times admitted that, despite "structure" and "interludes of orchestras tuning up", the album did not move them, calling it "all so humourless".

== Track listing ==
Black Friday track listing
| No. | Title | Writer(s) | Length |
|---|---|---|---|
| 1. | "Answer Phone" | Tom Odell | 2:40 |
| 2. | "Black Friday" | Odell; Laurie Blundell; Max Clilverd | 3:40 |
| 3. | "Loving You Will Be the Death of Me" | Odell; Blundell; Jonny Coffer | 2:11 |
| 4. | "The Orchestra Tunes Up" | Odell | 0:49 |
| 5. | "Spinning" | Odell; Blundell | 2:11 |
| 6. | "The End of the Summer" | Odell; Blundell | 2:07 |
| 7. | "The Orchestra Takes Flight" | Odell; Lucy Payne; Vincent Ott | 0:45 |
| 8. | "Somebody Else" | Odell; Blundell; Eric Leva | 3:23 |
| 9. | "Parties" | Odell; Blundell; Leva | 2:15 |
| 10. | "The Orchestra Is Feeling Tense" | Odell | 0:33 |
| 11. | "Nothing Hurts Like Love" | Odell; Blundell; Leva | 3:51 |
| 12. | "Getaway (Voice Note)" | Odell; Blundell | 0:45 |
| 13. | "The End" | Odell; Blundell; Leva | 3:24 |
| Total length: | | | 28:34 |

== Personnel ==
Credits adapted from Tidal.

- Tom Odell – production (all tracks); vocals, piano (tracks 1–6, 8, 9, 11–13), guitar (1–6, 8, 9, 12)
- Cityfall – production (all tracks), mixing (1–8, 10)
- Dave Kutch – mastering
- Christoph Skirl – engineering
- Matt Jagger – engineering
- Toby Couling – drums (1–6, 8, 9)
- Laurie Blunell – synthesizer (1–6, 8, 9, 11, 13), bass (6)
- Vincent Ott – strings conductor (1, 2, 4–11, 13)
- Desmond Neysmith – cello (1, 2, 4–11, 13)
- Jonny Byers – cello (1, 2, 4–11, 13)
- Laura Anstee – cello (1, 2, 4–11, 13)
- Nicholas Holland – cello (1, 2, 4–11, 13)
- Rebecca Hepplewhite – cello (1, 2, 4–11, 13)
- Susie Winkworth – cello (1, 2, 4–11, 13)
- Amy May – viola (1, 2, 4–11, 13)
- Amy Stanford – viola (1, 2, 4–11, 13)
- Brooke Day – viola (1, 2, 4–11, 13)
- Emma Owens – viola (1, 2, 4–11, 13)
- Helen Sanders-Hewett – viola (1, 2, 4–11, 13)
- Janina Kopinska – viola (1, 2, 4–11, 13)
- Akiko Ishikawa – violin (1, 2, 4–11, 13)
- Bogdan Vacarescu – violin (1, 2, 4–11, 13)
- Camille Said – violin (1, 2, 4–11, 13)
- Eleanor Stanford – violin (1, 2, 4–11, 13)
- Emma Parker – violin (1, 2, 4–11, 13)
- Harriet Mackenzie – violin (1, 2, 4–11, 13)
- Isabelle Allan – violin (1, 2, 4–11, 13)
- Joanne Davies – violin (1, 2, 4–11, 13)
- Julia Stewart – violin (1, 2, 4–11, 13)
- Kate Robinson – violin (1, 2, 4–11, 13)
- Rebekah Allan – violin (1, 2, 4–11, 13)
- Ros Stephen – violin (1, 2, 4–11, 13)
- Max Goff – bass (1, 2, 4, 5, 8)
- Neal H Pogue – mixing (2, 9, 11–13)
- Max Clilverd – electric guitar (2)

== Charts ==
Chart performance for Black Friday
| Chart (2024) | Peak position |
|---|---|
| Austrian Albums (Ö3 Austria) | 43 |
| Belgian Albums (Ultratop Flanders) | 8 |
| Belgian Albums (Ultratop Wallonia) | 46 |
| Dutch Albums (Album Top 100) | 9 |
| French Physical Albums (SNEP) | 110 |
| German Albums (Offizielle Top 100) | 32 |
| Irish Albums (IRMA) | 64 |
| Polish Albums (ZPAV) | 62 |
| Scottish Albums (OCC) | 4 |
| Swiss Albums (Schweizer Hitparade) | 20 |
| UK Albums (OCC) | 5 |
