= Magnetised (song) =

Single by Tom Odell

from the album Wrong Crowd
- Released: 15 April 2016
- Recorded: 2015
- Genre: Indie pop; Indietronica
- Length: 3:57
- Label: RCA Records
- Songwriter(s): Tom Odell; Rick Nowels
- Producer(s): Tom Odell; Jim Abbiss; Rick Nowels

Tom Odell singles chronology
"Wrong Crowd" (2015)	"Magnetised" (2016)	"Here I Am" (2016)

"Magnetised" is a song by British singer-songwriter Tom Odell and the second single from his second studio album Wrong Crowd (2016). It was released digitally on 15 April 2016. The song peaked at number 40 on the UK Singles Chart. The song was written by Tom Odell and Rick Nowels.

== Music video ==
A music video to accompany the release of "Magnetised" was first released onto YouTube on 15 April 2016 at a total length of three minutes and fifty-nine seconds. The music video was directed by George Belfield. The video, like the song itself, expresses the protagonist's frustrations about being attached to his significant other that doesn't reciprocate the same kind of love.

Odell was interviewed by Fuse regarding the concept of this video and its link to his previous single "Wrong Crowd" saying, "Magnetised very much hits into this idea of sort of “man vs. nature”: you have a cheater and you have a fast car and it’s like interesting, playing on that idea between the two of them. So he’s destroyed this relationship, you know, with a woman, and at this point he’s now realizing that she’s no longer available to him–and he can’t give it up. But it’s also playing on the idea of, sort of, nature. There’s a lyric in it called “I wish I had a little mother nature in me” which is kind of around the theme of the song of, he just wants a relationship which feels natural rather than this sort of perverse, poisoned situation he seems to be in, and Magnetised plays on that theme."

== Track listing ==
Digital download
No.	Title	Length
1.	"Magnetised"	3:57

== Chart performance ==
Chart (2016)	Peak position
Belgium (Ultratip Bubbling Under Flanders)	1
Belgium (Ultratip Bubbling Under Wallonia)	7
France (SNEP)	157
Ireland (IRMA)	62
New Zealand Heatseekers (Recorded Music NZ)	7
Scotland (OCC)	17
Switzerland (Schweizer Hitparade)	73
UK Singles (OCC)	40
US Adult Alternative Songs (Billboard)	20

== Certifications ==
Region	Certification	Certified units/sales
United Kingdom (BPI)	Silver	200,000^{‡}
^{‡} Sales+streaming figures based on certification alone.

== Release history ==
Region	Date	Format	Label
United Kingdom	15 April 2016	Digital download	RCA Records
