= If I Stay (film) =

2014 American film

- Theatrical release poster
- Directed by: R. J. Cutler
- Screenplay by: Shauna Cross
- Based on: If I Stay by Gayle Forman
- Produced by: Alison Greenspan
- Starring: Chloë Grace Moretz; Mireille Enos; Joshua Leonard; Stacy Keach
- Cinematography: John de Borman
- Edited by: Keith Henderson
- Music by: Heitor Pereira
- Production companies: New Line Cinema; Metro-Goldwyn-Mayer Pictures; Di Novi Pictures
- Distributed by: Warner Bros. Pictures
- Release dates: August 18, 2014 (New York premiere); August 22, 2014 (United States)
- Running time: 107 minutes
- Country: United States
- Language: English
- Budget: $11 million
- Box office: $78.9 million

If I Stay is a 2014 American science fiction romantic drama film directed by R. J. Cutler, and based on the 2009 novel by Gayle Forman. The film stars Chloë Grace Moretz, Mireille Enos, Joshua Leonard, and Stacy Keach.

Seventeen-year-old Mia Hall's life instantly changes after a car accident puts her in a coma. She must choose to go on or not, knowing that if she wakes up her life will be far different from what she had expected.

If I Stay premiered in New York on August 18, 2014, and was released by Warner Bros. Pictures on August 22, 2014, grossing $78.9 million worldwide against a budget of $11 million. The film received generally negative reviews, with the Rotten Tomatoes consensus calling it "more manipulative than moving", although Moretz's performance was praised.

== Plot ==
Seventeen-year-old aspiring cellist Mia Hall and her family hear a snow day announcement on the radio. Since Mia's teacher father Denny does not have to go to work as a result, her travel agent mother Kat takes a sick day so that the whole family can visit Mia's grandparents, who live on a farm.

As a child, Mia's parents recognized her interest and passion for the cello when she took her first music class, so hired a cello teacher for her. Kat soon after fell pregnant with Mia's younger brother Teddy, who Mia suspects is the reason for her father's departure from his rock band. Years later, an adolescent Mia met Adam Wilde, a popular student and up-and-coming rockstar, while in the music room at school, and they soon began dating.

Their relationship became strained when Adam's band Willamette Stone was signed to a label and Mia completed a successful audition at Juilliard. After discussing the future of their relationship, the two broke up on mutual terms, both not wanting to hinder the other's ability to achieve their dreams.

In the present, the Hall family's car suddenly collides with an oncoming truck. Mia then sees her family's unconscious bodies lying on the road, while paramedics rush to their aid. When she tries to ask what is happening, they do not acknowledge her, and she realizes she is having an out of body experience. Mia rides inside the ambulance to the hospital, where her physical body is taken in for surgery. A sympathetic nurse whispers to Mia's unconscious body that it is up to her whether she wants to fight to stay alive.

As Mia undergoes surgery, she sees a doctor speaking with her grandparents, who are standing outside of a pediatric room where Teddy lies in a coma-like state. Adam arrives at the hospital to see Mia, but is not allowed in as he is not an immediate family member. It is then revealed that Kat was pronounced dead on arrival and Denny died on the operating table.

Mia later finds out that Teddy has died from an epidural hematoma. George talks to Mia's body, revealing that when her father first discovered her talent for playing cello, he decided to sacrifice his career, selling his drum kit so he could fund her future in music. He tearfully gives Mia permission to move on from this life if she wants to. Mia then decides she wants to join her family on the other side.

After some time, Mia's condition stabilizes enough to receive more visitors. Just before Mia allows herself to succumb to her injuries, she stops when she hears the cello recital piece she and Adam had attended on their first date. He is sitting next to her and playing the song for her on his iPod.

Adam has also brought Mia's acceptance letter from Juilliard, and promises to do anything she asks of him if she stays. He then begins to play her a song he has written about her. Mia, after recalling all the happiest moments in her life, squeezes Adam's hand and opens her eyes, and he calls out her name.

== Cast ==
- Chloë Grace Moretz as Mia Hall
- Jamie Blackley as Adam Wilde
- Mireille Enos as Kat Hall
- Joshua Leonard as Denny Hall
- Stacy Keach as George Hall
- Aisha Hinds as Nurse Ramirez
- Lauren Lee Smith as Willow
- Liana Liberato as Kim Schein
- Aliyah O'Brien as EMT
- Jakob Davies as Teddy Hall

== Production ==
In December 2010, it was announced that a film based on the novel If I Stay was in the works at Summit Entertainment and that Dakota Fanning, Chloë Grace Moretz and Emily Browning were in talks to play Mia. Catherine Hardwicke was attached to direct, but was replaced by Brazilian filmmaker Heitor Dhalia, who also left the film later. On January 24, 2013, Moretz was officially cast to play the lead and R. J. Cutler was announced as the new director of the film. Trevor Smith was brought on as associate producer. The shooting of the film began on October 30 in Vancouver.

In January 2014, Metro-Goldwyn-Mayer and Warner Bros. were announced to be distributing the film and the release was set for August 22.

=== Music ===
The music was composed by Heitor Pereira. The soundtrack was released on August 19, 2014, by WaterTower Music. It peaked at number 54 on the Billboard 200 in the United States, and number 77 in Australia.

Vancouver-based alternative rock band Hawking appeared in the film numerous times as Willamette Stone.

All the songs for Adam Wilde's band Willamette Stone, including the cover of The Smashing Pumpkins' song "Today", were produced by indie rock producer Adam Lasus.

== Reception ==
=== Box office ===
As of November 20, 2014, If I Stay has grossed a worldwide total of $78,396,071 against a budget of $11 million.

If I Stay opened at #3 to 2,907 locations in North America behind Guardians of the Galaxy and Teenage Mutant Ninja Turtles, which were in their fourth and third weeks respectively. On its opening day the film earned $6,827,007 earning it the top spot for the day.

=== Critical response ===
On Rotten Tomatoes, the film has a rating of 36%, based on 137 reviews, with an average score of 5.0/10. The site's critical consensus reads: "Although Chloë Grace Moretz gives it her all and the story adds an intriguing supernatural twist to its melodramatic YA framework, If I Stay is ultimately more manipulative than moving." On Metacritic, the film holds a score of 46 out of 100, based on 36 critics, indicating "mixed or average" reviews. Audiences polled by CinemaScore gave the film an average grade of "A-" on an A+ to F scale.

In his review for The New York Times, A. O. Scott praised Moretz's acting. He added that the "music is both the best and the corniest part of If I Stay, which makes excellent use of the classical cello repertoire." Writing for Variety, Justin Chang criticized Moretz's acting, explaining that "she comes off as a bit too self-assured to play the nerdy misfit." Anthony Lane of The New Yorker wrote a critical review of the movie, saying, "The saddest thing about 'If I Stay' is that it affords Moretz so little opportunity to be non-sad." In the Los Angeles Times, Olivier Gettell summed up that critics saw the film was "clunky and uninspired."

=== Accolades ===
Award	Category	Recipient(s)	Result	Ref(s)
People's Choice Awards	Favorite Dramatic Movie		Nominated	
People's Choice Awards	Favorite Dramatic Movie Actress	Chloë Grace Moretz	Won	
Teen Choice Awards	Choice Movie: Drama		Won	
Teen Choice Awards	Choice Movie Actress: Drama	Chloë Grace Moretz	Won	

== Home media ==
If I Stay was released on DVD and Blu-ray on November 18, 2014, by 20th Century Fox Home Entertainment (under license from MGM).
