= Tom Odell =

English singer-songwriter (born 1990)

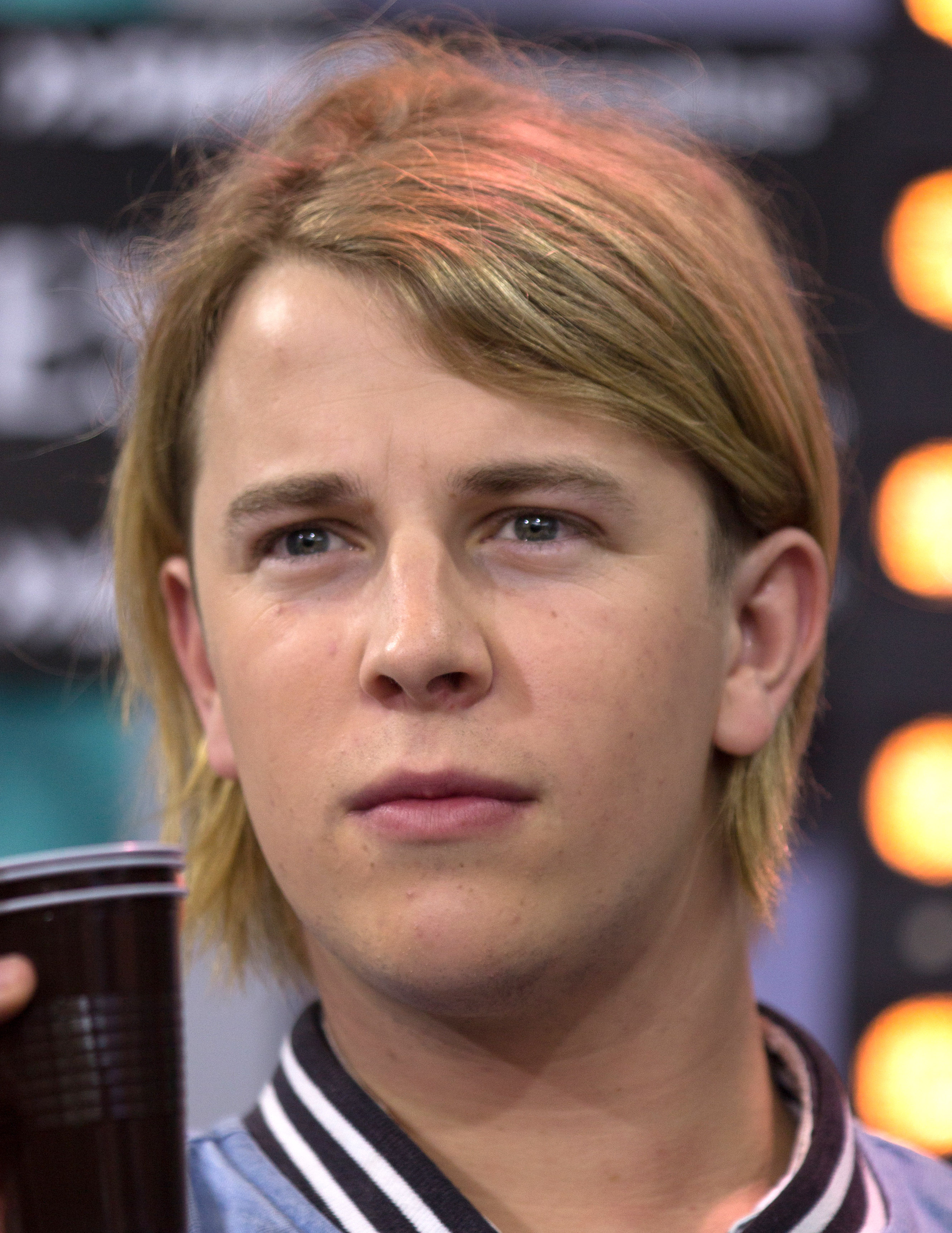
- Odell in 2013

Background information
- Born: Thomas Peter Odell; 24 November 1990 (age 35); Chichester, West Sussex, England
- Genres: Indie pop; folk-pop
- Occupations: Singer-songwriter; musician
- Instruments: Vocals; piano; guitar
- Years active: 2012–present
- Labels: Columbia; In the Name Of; RCA
- Spouse: Georgina Odell (m. 2023)
- Website: tomodell.com

Thomas Peter Odell (born 24 November 1990) is an English singer-songwriter. His debut EP, Songs from Another Love, was released in 2012, earning him a BRITs Critics' Choice Award. He won an Ivor Novello Award for Songwriter of the Year in 2014. His first full-length album, Long Way Down, came out in 2013 and was followed by Wrong Crowd in 2016. Odell went on to release Jubilee Road (2018) and Monsters (2021), both through Columbia Records. In 2022, he became an independent artist and released two more studio albums: Best Day of My Life (2022) and Black Friday (2024), the latter featuring the breakout track "Black Friday", which was one of his most successful singles as of June 2025. In 2025, he published A Wonderful Life.

== Early life ==
Odell was born in Chichester, West Sussex, England, to an airline pilot father and a primary school teacher mother. He has an older sister. He spent part of his childhood living in Auckland, New Zealand after his family moved to the country. He was educated at Bishop Luffa School and Seaford College in West Sussex but also recalls attending school in New Zealand.

Throughout his school years, Odell wrote songs in a band that had trouble maintaining a lead singer. This trouble inspired him to start singing the songs he wrote, and Odell says he "sang [the songs] how [he] wanted them to sound" rather than worrying about someone else not bringing his vision to life.

At 18, Odell abandoned plans to attend the University of York and attempted to gain a place at a music college in Liverpool. A year later, he moved back to Chichester after being made redundant from his job as a barman. Using his grandmother's car, he travelled regularly to London to play shows and to put advertisements in music schools. He studied at the Brighton Institute of Modern Music (BIMM) in Brighton playing as part of the band Tom & the Tides before moving to London where he decided to become a solo artist because he "didn't want to have to rely on people".

== Career ==
=== 2012–2013: Career beginnings and Long Way Down ===
Odell was signed to In the Name Of, an imprint of Columbia Records. He was discovered by the label head Lily Allen, who remarked that "his energy onstage reminded me of David Bowie". He released his debut extended play, Songs from Another Love, in October 2012. He made his television debut in November 2012 as a performer on Later... with Jools Holland; the show's producer Alison Howe later described it as "a classic Later debut". Odell was announced as one of 15 nominees for the BBC Sound of 2013 poll in January 2013. Also that month, his single "Another Love" was used by the BBC to advertise their 2013 schedule. Odell's music has been used in numerous Burberry fashion runway shows. He was named the BRITs' Critics' Choice Award winner, previously won by artists such as Adele and Florence and the Machine and was the first male artist to win the award, and was interviewed alongside previous winner Emeli Sandé during the television ceremony in February 2013.

Odell's debut album, Long Way Down, was released on 24 June 2013 and reached No. 1 in the UK Official Chart. He was due to support The Rolling Stones at London's Hyde Park on 13 July 2013, but was unable to perform because of illness.

=== 2014–2015: Recognition ===
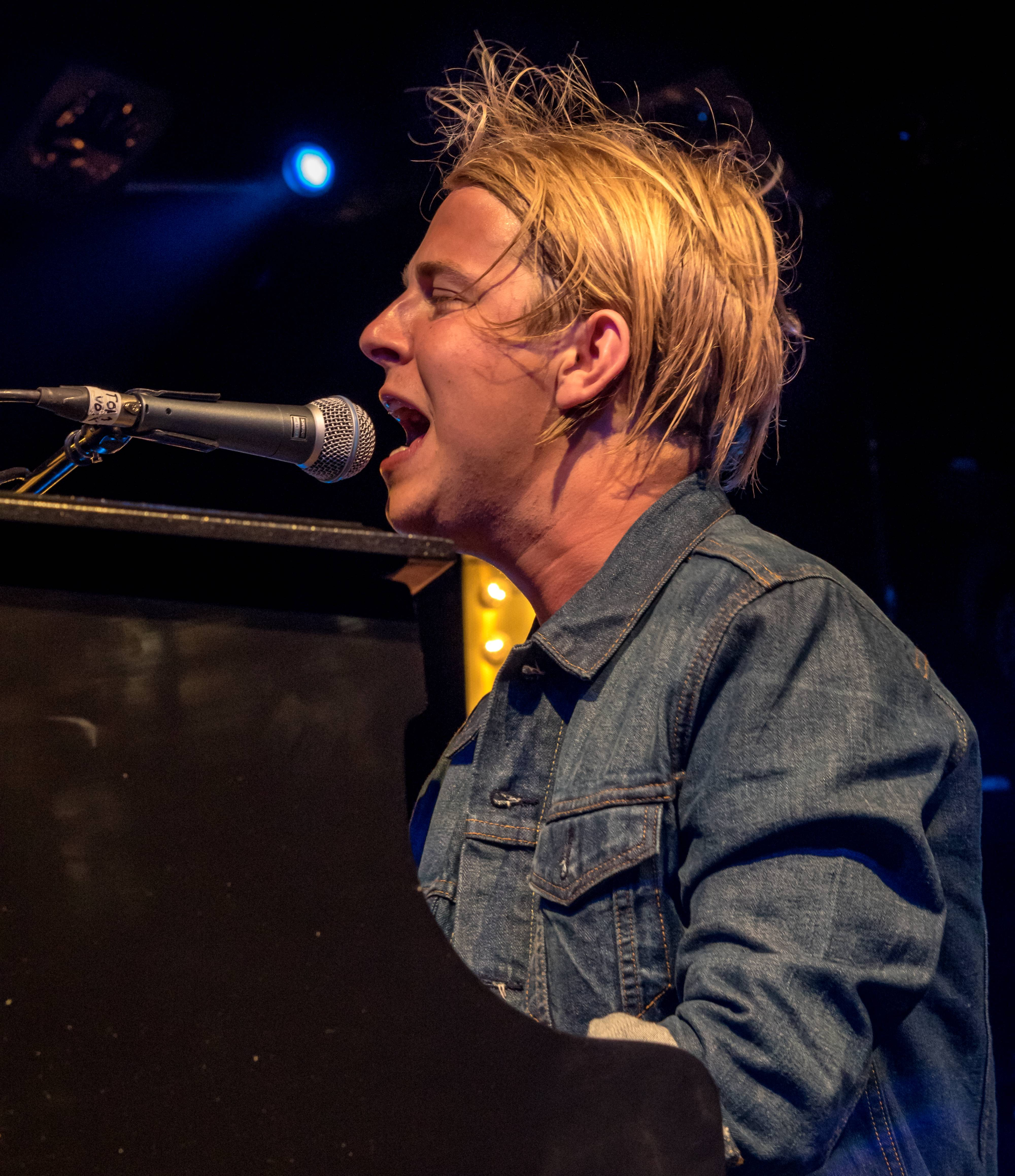
Tom Odell, Zelt Musik Festival 2015 in Freiburg, Germany

Odell performed his first new song since the release of Long Way Down, entitled "Alex", on 7 February 2014 at the Plymouth Pavilions. The show kicked off the last leg of his UK Long Way Down Tour.

Odell was named 'songwriter of the year' at the 2014 Ivor Novello Awards ceremony. Odell's song "Can't Pretend" was used in the TV series The 100. "Can't Pretend" and "Long Way Down" were also featured on The Blacklist and the award-winning movie The Fault In Our Stars. His song "Grow Old With Me" was featured in an episode of Reign. The song was also featured in a major 60 second ad campaign for Kaiser Permanente entitled "Thrive". His song "Heal" was also used in the film If I Stay and The Miracle Season, and the TV series NCIS, The Vampire Diaries and Elementary along with "Another Love".

Odell's next song, a cover of "Real Love" by The Beatles, was the audio track to the 2014 John Lewis Christmas advert and gained him great publicity. Within hours of the advert being aired for the first time, the track reached to the top of the music recognition service Shazam’s trending list. Within three days of release, it went straight to 21 in the UK top 40, peaking at 7.

In 2014, during Tomorrowland (festival), Swedish DJ Avicii premiered a collaboration between him and Odell. It hasn't been released, but it was titled "Can't Love You Again", according to the official tracklist. Avicii has previously stated on Quora, that the song was due to release on a 2016 album, but both the album and the song was cancelled later.

Odell's music was featured in a Sony advert in 2016, with a cover of "True Colours" by Cyndi Lauper.

=== 2016–2017: Wrong Crowd ===
Odell began working on his second studio album in 2015, and played a variety of new songs at Forest Live, a concert series in England's forests by the Forestry Commission. On 4 April 2016, the first single, "Wrong Crowd", was released, and an upcoming second studio album of the same name was announced. In addition, Odell announced that he would be going on tour in the US and Europe. On 15 April 2016, the second single from the album, "Magnetised", was released. The next day, Odell revealed that his sold-out shows were titled the No Bad Days Tour, which kicked off on 20 April 2016 in London. The full album was released on 10 June 2016. In an interview with Holly Willoughby and Phillip Schofield on This Morning, Odell revealed that in some countries outside the UK, audiences have misunderstood the title of the album to be an insult, that they are in fact a bad crowd or so to speak the 'wrong crowd'.

=== 2017–2020: Jubilee Road ===
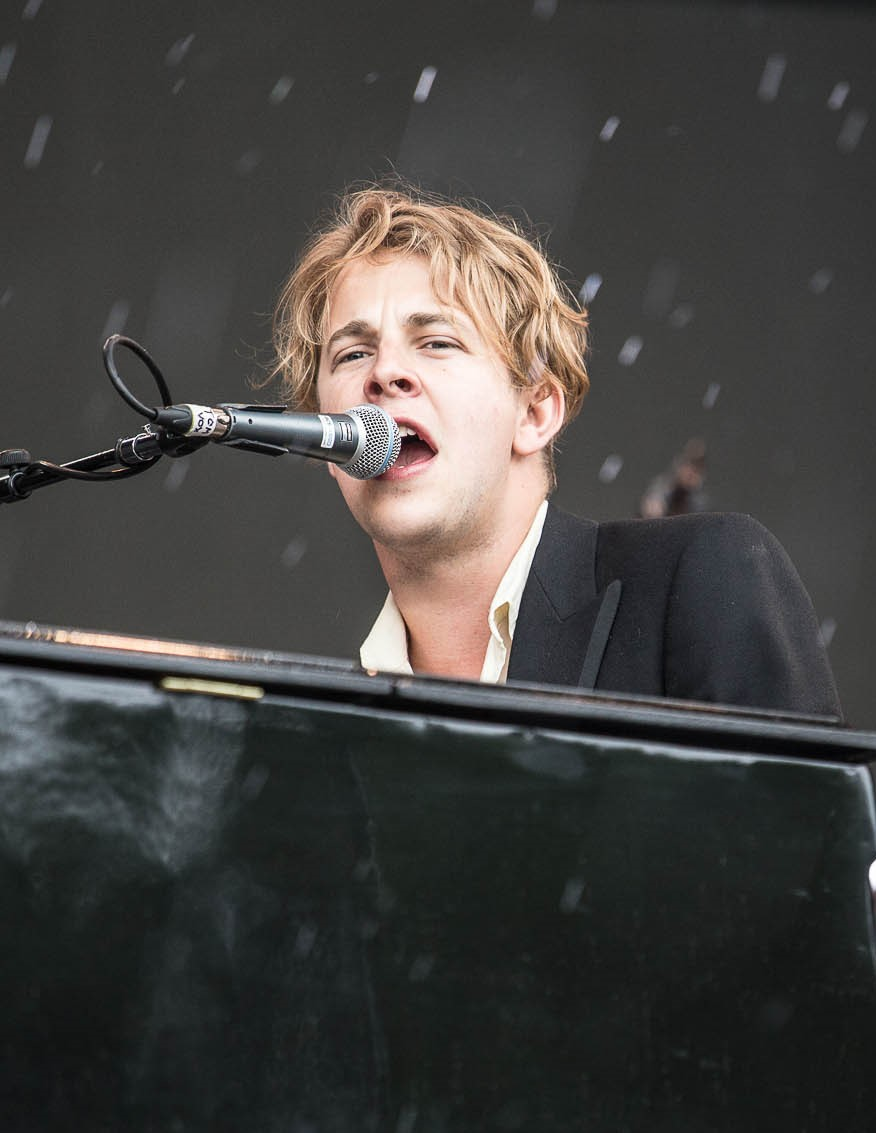
Tom Odell performing at Orange Warsaw Festival 2016

On his No Bad Days tour, Odell revealed he was writing for his third album and played several new songs live. In November 2017, he toured Germany on the New Fall Festival in Düsseldorf and Stuttgart and announced that the album had been finished and a first single was to be released imminently. On 20 December 2017 Odell announced in an interview on BBC Radio 2 that the album was scheduled for release in mid-2018. On 14 June 2018, the first single from the album, "If You Wanna Love Somebody", was released worldwide. The album, Jubilee Road, was released on 26 October.

Jubilee Road was inspired by his past neighbours and community. The title "Jubilee Road" is supposed to be a reference to a terraced street in east London that Odell lived on, but when he asked his neighbours if he could use the real name, they responded that they were afraid it would become a tourist destination and would rather him create a fictional name.

=== 2021–2022: Monsters and Best Day of My Life ===
"Numb", the first single from Odell's fourth album, was released in February 2021. In an interview with The Gentleman's Journal on 27 February 2021, it was revealed that Odell's fourth studio album is titled Monsters. He stated that the album would feature darker, electro-pop tones, and the lyrics were inspired by artists such as XXXTentacion, Drake and Travis Scott. The second single from the album, "Monster v.1", was released in March 2021. The record touches on heavy subjects and rough experiences he had during a "fever pitch" in his life, particularly struggling with anxiety and panic attacks. The album was released on 9 July 2021.

On 8 September 2022, Odell announced the release of his fifth studio album, Best Day of My Life, released on 28 October 2022. The album was preceded by the singles "Best Day of My Life", "Sad Anymore", "Flying" and "Smiling All the Way Back Home".

=== 2023–present: Black Friday and A Wonderful Life ===
Odell released the piano ballad "Butterflies" on 27 January 2023, which featured Aurora, and a reimagined version of "Streets Of Heaven" on 18 August, a track previously released on his 2022 album Monsters.

Odell released the track "Black Friday" on 22 September 2023, which was followed by "Somebody Else" on 13 October - along with an announcement that his sixth album, Black Friday, would be released on 26 January 2024. "Answer Phone" was released on 17 November, and "The End" was released on 22 December.

Odell's 7th studio album, A Wonderful Life, was released on 5 September 2025. A Wonderful Life was written as a reaction to the news cycle and the sense that the world is ending in some capacity.

== Influences ==
Odell grew up listening to Elton John. One of the first albums he listened to was Goodbye Yellow Brick Road (1973). He also cites David Bowie, Jeff Buckley, Bob Dylan, Arthur Russell, Leonard Cohen, Leon Russell, Billy Joel, Randy Newman, Tom Waits, Rodríguez and Bruce Springsteen as influences. He is a fan of Adele, James Blake, Cat Power, Blur, Beach House, Radiohead, Coldplay and Ben Folds.

Odell has said his lyrics are inspired by his "inability to sustain a relationship with someone for longer than six months." He says, "I find that I write much better songs when I'm being honest, and writing about things that happen to me. It can get a little weird though, when friends or girlfriends work out that a song is about them. But it's amazing what you can get away with it. Artistic licence, I think they call it."

== Activism ==
In February 2016, Tom began a long-standing relationship with Choose Love / Help Refugees and has worked with them throughout his career. Actor Jude Law and singer Tom Odell were among a host of famous faces who took to the stage at the Jungle camp in Calais in a bid to raise the plight of refugees.

In 2017, Tom Odell played an intimate one-off show to help raise money for refugees in Calais, Greece, Syria and beyond for the charity. In September of that year, Tom performed to raise money for refugees as part of the Give A Home series with Amnesty International.

In March 2022, Tom performed at a series of events aimed at raising awareness and aid for Ukraine. While working with Choose Love on the ground there getting aid to refugees, Tom performed spontaneously in Bucharest as Ukrainian refugees arrived on trains from Kyiv. Tom performed at a concert, along with Ed Sheeran and others, which raised over £11M for Ukraine. Tom also performed in a concert in Bucharest which raised over €1M for the Red Cross effort in Ukraine.

In 2022, a remix of Another Love by Tom Odell and Tiesto was used to help raise money for Ukraine. Another Love appeared on UK’s Official Charts after becoming a viral protest song for Ukraine and women in Iran.

In August 2023, the song “Streets of Heaven” was re-released in conjunction with Everytown.org to raise money and awareness for gun control in America.

== Personal life ==
Odell married model and artist Georgina Odell (née Somerville) in November 2023.

== Discography ==
Studio albums

- Long Way Down (2013)
- Wrong Crowd (2016)
- Jubilee Road (2018)
- Monsters (2021)
- Best Day of My Life (2022)
- Black Friday (2024)
- A Wonderful Life (2025)

== Tours and concerts ==
Headlining Tours

- Long Way Down Tour (2013)
- No Bad Days Tour (2016–2017)
- Jubilee Road Tour (2018–2019)
- Monsters Tour (2022)
- Black Friday Tour (2024)
- Don’t Let Me Go Tour (2025)
- Wonderful Life Tour (2025)

Opening Act

- Billie Eilish - Hit Me Hard and Soft: The Tour (2025)
- The Lumineers - The Automatic World Tour (2025)

== Awards and nominations ==
Year	Organisation	Award	Result	Ref.
2013	MTV	Brand New For 2013	Nominated	
2013	BRIT Awards	Critics' Choice Award	Won	
2013	BBC	Sound of 2013	Nominated	
2014	BRIT Awards	British Male Solo Artist	Nominated	
2014	BRIT Awards	British Breakthrough Act	Nominated	
2014	Ivor Novello Awards	Songwriter of the Year	Won	
2023	Los 40 Music Awards	Best International Live Act	Won	
2023	Ivor Novello Awards	Best Song Musically and Lyrically (Note: "Best Day of My Life" – co-written with Laurie Blundell.)	Nominated	
2024	Ivor Novello Awards	Best Song Musically and Lyrically (Note: "Black Friday" – co-written with Laurie Blundell and Max Clilverd.)	Nominated	
