= In the Name Of (record label) =

British record label

- Parent company: Sony Music Entertainment
- Founded: 2011
- Founder: Lily Allen
- Defunct: 2014
- Status: Closed

ITNO, or In the Name Of, was a British record label owned by Sony Music Entertainment and founded by singer Lily Allen, which existed from 2011 to 2014.

== Background ==
Allen started work on the label in 2009, when she announced that she would take a break from recording her own music, and that she wanted to set up her own label as she was disillusioned with the music industry. She said: "I'm setting up a record label at the moment, getting involved in lots of different things. I think things need to change in the music industry and we need to rethink a lot of stuff."

The label, titled In the Name Of, was launched in 2011. It was financially backed by Sony Music, which gave Allen a £100,000 annual salary to hire staff and set up an office. The label's first act signed was New York noise pop duo Cults.

The label closed in 2014, concurrently with Allen's return to performing music.

== Former artists ==
- Cults
- Tom Odell
