= Adam Samuel Goldman =

American singer

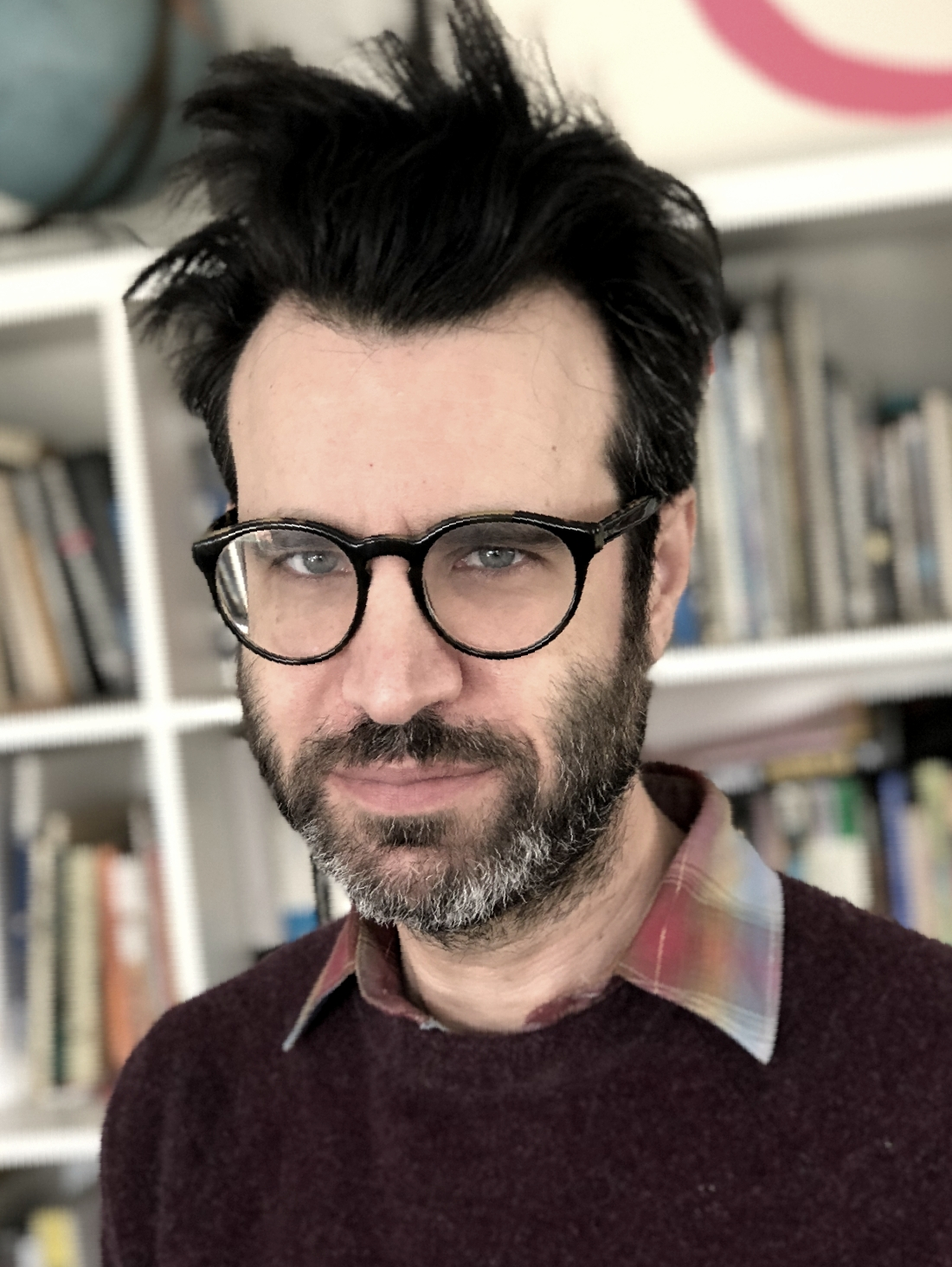
- Adam Samuel Goldman, Los Angeles, 2018

Background information
- Also known as: Samuel Bing
- Born: Syosset, New York, U.S.
- Genres: Art pop; Avant-pop; pop; electronic; Film score
- Occupations: screenwriter; television and film composer; producer; songwriter
- Instruments: vocals; guitar; synthesizer
- Years active: 2001–present
- Label: Asthmatic Kitty

Adam Samuel Goldman is a Los Angeles–based screenwriter, producer, and composer. He cowrote and produced For Madmen Only: The Stories of Del Close, a comedy-doc hybrid that premiered at SXSW in 2021, and Flipside, a feature documentary premiering at the Toronto International Film Festival in 2023. His score for the CBS primetime drama The Code earned an ASCAP Screen Music Award in 2020.

Goldman was songwriter and producer for the art-pop band Fol Chen, which released three albums on Sufjan Stevens's Asthmatic Kitty label from 2009 to 2013 and was noted for its "instantly unique blend of dread and whimsy." He was also songwriter and singer for chamber pop band Bedroom Walls and touring guitarist for Liars on their 2008 tour opening for Radiohead.

== Film and television ==
Goldman studied filmmaking and holds a Master's degree from California Institute of the Arts, where he studied with Thom Andersen and James Benning. His early work includes the 1998 documentary short The Mark Twain Company, which screened at MoMA, Los Angeles Filmforum, and Other Cinema in San Francisco. Craig Baldwin described the film as a “deadpan inventory of the evolution of Twain’s familial and cultural bequests [that] constitutes a canny critical treatise on relations between artists, estates, heirs, intellectual property, and public memory” and said it “offers crucial insights into how artistic intentions are unexpectedly transformed by historical forces.” The LA Weekly called it “a fascinating and revealing portrait of the insidious workings of capitalist enterprise.”

He began composing for film in 2000 with the feature documentary The Target Shoots First, directed by Chris Wilcha. His film and television credits as a composer include scoring the CBS military-legal drama The Code, which earned him a 2020 ASCAP Screen Music Award; the documentary film Knock Knock, It's Tig Notaro for Showtime; Patrik-Ian Polk's feature film Noah's Arc: Jumping the Broom (LOGO Films); and nonfiction projects for director Lauren Greenfield, including Beauty CULTure (co-written with Julian Wass as Fol Chen). His songs have been used in the television shows Weeds (Showtime), CSI:NY (CBS), Elementary (CBS), The Mindy Project (FOX), This American Life (Showtime), The 4400 (USA Network), and One Nation Under Dog (HBO). Goldman's commercial work includes music composed for Visa, Hyundai, and Canon.

Goldman is also screenwriter and producer. With director Heather Ross, he cowrote and produced For Madmen Only: The Stories of Del Close (2020), a feature comedy-documentary hybrid about the improvisational comedy guru who coached many of the best-known comedians and comic actors of the late twentieth century. Starring Patton Oswalt, James Urbaniak (as Close), Matt Walsh, Josh Fadem, and Lauren Lapkus, the film premiered at SXSW and is distributed by Hulu.

Most recently, he cowrote, produced, and scored Flipside. Directed by Chris Wilcha and executive produced by Judd Apatow, Flipside premiered at the Toronto International Film Festival on September 10, 2023.

== Music and Art ==
Goldman produced Andrew Bird’s Echolocations: River (2017), which was described by AllMusic as “darkly enchanting” and “a wholly unique experience, fusing ambient improvisations with chamber music and environmental soundscapes.” He co-wrote and co-produced Silver Silver (2012), an album by Simone White, released on Damon Albarn’s Honest Jon’s imprint.

Under his Fol Chen pseudonym Samuel Bing, Goldman remixed Junior Vasquez’s “Insecurities” for release on the Tommy Boy label in 2009. That same year, he produced a cover of Prince’s “The Beautiful Ones” for Spin magazine’s Purplish Rain tribute album. He teamed up with KCRW disc jockey Eric J. Lawrence to remix David Bowie’s “Golden Years” as part of a deluxe reissue of Bowie’s Station To Station album.

For the 2017 Dunedin Fringe Festival in New Zealand, Goldman organized Anything Could Happen with key figures from the Dunedin Sound music scene including Roy Colbert of Records Records, Alastair Galbraith, and members of Straitjacket Fits, The Chills, Look Blue Go Purple, The Verlaines, and The Bats. He has collaborated with Machine Project on performances and projects at the Walker Art Center, LACMA, Colgate University.

In 2011, Goldman and Fol Chen collaborated with Monome on "a crazy motion-sensitive musical pyramid" sound toy called The Tetrafol.

== Discography ==
Fol Chen

- The False Alarms (2013)
- Part II: The New December (2010)
- The Holograms (EP)
- In Ruins (EP)
- Part I: John Shade, Your Fortune's Made (2009)

Bedroom Walls

- All Good Dreamers Pass This Way (2006)
- I Saw You Coming Back To Me (2003)
