= Watson (TV series) =

2025 American television series

- Star Morris Chestnut in a promotional poster for the first season
- Genre: Medical drama; Mystery; Crime drama
- Created by: Craig Sweeny
- Based on: The works of Sir Arthur Conan Doyle
- Starring: Morris Chestnut; Eve Harlow; Peter Mark Kendall; Inga Schlingmann; Ritchie Coster; Rochelle Aytes
- Music by: Paul Leonard-Morgan
- Country of origin: United States
- Original language: English
- No. of seasons: 2
- No. of episodes: 33

Production
- Executive producers: Shäron Moalem; Morris Chestnut; Brian Morewitz; Sallie Patrick; Aaron Kaplan; Larry Teng; Craig Sweeny
- Producer: Scott Graham
- Production location: Vancouver, British Columbia, Canada
- Cinematography: Brook Willard; Shamus Whiting-Hewlett; James Liston
- Editors: Jesse Ellis; Sondra Watanabe; Aric Lewis; Gerald Valdez; Erik Evans; Mark Manos; Michael Benni Pierce
- Production companies: Action This Day!; Kapital Entertainment; CBS Studios

Original release
- Network: CBS
- Release: January 26, 2025 – May 3, 2026

Watson is an American television series created by Craig Sweeny which premiered on CBS on January 26, 2025. The series, described as a "medical drama with detective elements", revolves around the character of Dr. John Watson from Arthur Conan Doyle's Sherlock Holmes stories, with Morris Chestnut portraying the character. It is the second CBS series to adapt the Holmes stories, after Elementary. While the two programs are otherwise unrelated, their creative teams overlap. In March 2025, the series was renewed for a second season, which premiered on October 13, 2025. In March 2026, the series was canceled after two seasons, and concluded on May 3, 2026.

== Premise ==
One year after Sherlock Holmes's apparent death at the hands of his archenemy Moriarty at Reichenbach Falls, Dr. John Watson resumes his medical practice by opening the "Holmes Clinic" in Pittsburgh to treat patients with strange and unidentifiable issues. Soon however, Watson must face his past when evidence surfaces indicating that Moriarty is still alive.

In the second season, Holmes emerges alive, although Watson comes to have doubts as to whether he is quite the same man he used to be.

== Cast and characters ==
The cast of Watson

=== Main ===
- Morris Chestnut as Dr. John Hamish Watson, a former London-based physician and consulting detective, now the head of the Holmes Clinic of Diagnostic Medicine. To aid his patients' cases, he applies a specific type of deductive reasoning that he learned from his years working with Sherlock Holmes.
  - Kevin Vidal plays a younger Watson in the episode "Take a Family History"
- Eve Harlow as Dr. Ingrid Derian, an aloof but highly skilled neurologist with an enigmatic past. She has a shaky relationship with her colleagues owing to her stony manner and questionable methods. In season 2, she starts group therapy to deal with her behaviour.
  - Amanda Arcuri plays a teenaged Ingrid in the episode "Take a Family History"
- Peter Mark Kendall as Drs. Stephens Croft and Adam (birth name Adams) Croft, identical twin brothers, acting as infectious disease and functional medicine specialists at the clinic. Stephens, a Johns Hopkins graduate, is an emotionally withdrawn workaholic, while Adam, who attended Boston University, is more extroverted. They have a strained relationship because Adam is dating Stephens' ex-fiancée.
- Inga Schlingmann as Dr. Sasha Lubbock, a specialist in immunology and rheumatology. An affable Texan, she was born in China and raised in Dallas. In Season 2, she is searching for her biological mother.
- Ritchie Coster as Shinwell Johnson, a former criminal from London and an acquaintance of Holmes and Watson who works as the clinic's administrative aide, his connections often proving very useful to the team. In Season 2, he is training to be a nurse.
- Rochelle Aytes as Dr. Mary Morstan, an East Coast surgeon and Watson's estranged (later ex-) wife. Despite their impending divorce, she maintains a productive working relationship with Watson, acting as his voice of sanity and attempting to rein in his more irregular techniques.

=== Recurring ===
- Randall Park as Professor James Moriarty (season 1), a criminal mastermind and Sherlock Holmes' archenemy who re-emerges from his presumed death with a nefarious agenda
- Kacey Rohl as Hannah Burke (season 1), Moriarty's subordinate who forces Shinwell to carry out her employer's bidding
- Amanda Crew as Lauren Confalone (season 2; guest season 1), a lawyer and Stephens' ex-fiancée who is engaged to Adam
- Rachel Hayward as Detective Lestrade (season 2; guest season 1), a veteran Pittsburgh Police Department investigator who develops a friendship with Watson
- Tika Sumpter as Laila Bynum (season 2; guest season 1), a pediatric oncologist treating Ashleigh Burke who forms a relationship with Watson
- Robert Carlyle as Sherlock Holmes (season 2), a brilliant British consulting detective and Watson's best friend who was seemingly killed by Moriarty
  - Matt Berry voices an auditory hallucination of Holmes in the first season episode "Teeth Marks"
- Noah Mills as Beck Wythe (season 2), an enigmatic washed-up tech worker in exile from Silicon Valley who Ingrid meets at group therapy
- John Cassini as Ivan Ferry (season 2), a group therapist who is treating Ingrid and Beck
- Margot Bingham as Carlin DaCosta (season 2), a nurse who befriends Shinwell
- Karen Robinson as Brenda the Battle Axe (season 2; guest season 1), a formidable overseer of the anatomy lab at UHOP's med school. In season 2, she fills in as the clinic's receptionist whilst Shinwell takes leave to search for Sherlock.

=== Guest ===
- Bethany Brown as Devin Chaplin, the Executive Vice President of Human Resources at UHOP
- Nat Faxon as Hobie McSorley, an experimental geneticist and old friend of Watson's with a colorful personality
- Logan Mae as Ashleigh Burke (season 1), Hannah Burke's daughter who is sick and needs to be saved by Watson
- Kiera Allen as Gigi Grigoryan (season 1), Ingrid's paraplegic sister. Beatrice Schneider plays a teenaged Gigi.
- Whoopie Van Raam as Irene Adler (season 1), a con artist and the only woman ever to outwit Holmes who turns to Watson in a moment of desperation regarding her son
- Sebastian Billingsley-Rodriguez as Angus Adler (season 1), Irene's young son who might be the offspring of Sherlock Holmes
- Vincent Gale as Mycroft Holmes, Sherlock's reclusive older brother who previously crossed paths with Watson
- Andy Bean as Ivo Derian (season 1), Ingrid and Gigi's father
- Juanita Jennings as Elizabeth Morstan (season 2), Mary's mother who is admitted for accidental self poisoning after exhibiting dementia-like symptoms
- Khary Payton as Miles McClung (season 2), a bakery owner who is discovered to be Elizabeth Morstan's first-born child, and thus, Mary's heretofore unknown older brother
- Tzi Ma as Jun (season 2), Sasha's long lost birth uncle
- Clarke Peters as Hamish Watson (season 2), a saxophonist who is John Watson's estranged father
- Shannon Purser as Shannon (season 2), an AI chatbot
- Eddie Izzard as Sebastian Moran (season 2), a former minion of Moriarty

== Episodes ==
=== Series overview ===
Season	Episodes	Originally released	
Season	Episodes	First released	Last released
1	13	January 26, 2025	May 11, 2025
2	20	October 13, 2025	May 3, 2026

=== Season 1 (2025) ===
No. overall	No. in season	Title	Directed by	Written by	Original release date	U.S. viewers (millions)
1	1	"Pilot"	Larry Teng	Craig Sweeny	January 26, 2025	9.58
At Reichenbach Falls in Switzerland, detective Sherlock Holmes and master criminal James Moriarty fight before plunging into the water. (Note: This fight is depicted in the short story "The Final Problem.") Holmes's friend Dr. John Watson jumps in after them, sustaining a traumatic brain injury in the process. Waking up in a Swiss hospital, Watson learns that he was the only survivor. He is informed by associate Shinwell Johnson that Holmes secretly funded a private clinic in his will so Watson could find a new purpose if he died. Months later, the Holmes Clinic for Diagnostic Medicine is operational at the University Hospital of Pittsburgh. Watson and his handpicked team take on a new patient at the request of his estranged wife, hospital administrator Mary Morstan. The patient, Erika Filipello, appears to be dying from fatal insomnia, but Watson discovers not only that she has a genetic deficiency of biotinidase, but also that her similarly ill cousin Autumn is actually the girl's half-sister. However, Autumn falls into septic shock and Watson cannot call in his usual surgeon because of bad weather. Mary, a former surgeon, agrees to operate, saving Autumn's life. Later, Watson retrieves his old case files at Mary's encouragement. Shinwell delivers a case of genetic samples to a still-alive Moriarty (Randall Park), who reminds him that he is watching "always and everywhere."
2	2	"Redcoat"	Larry Teng	Craig Sweeny	February 16, 2025	4.32
Entrepreneur Andrew Tanner (Damian O'Hare) is left with a bullet lodged in his brain from an attempted murder. His case is further complicated when he claims to be the famous Scottish military officer Patrick Ferguson. Watson gives his team a lesson in the value of applying investigative techniques while deducing the cause of Tanner's condition. Stephens is able to glean from social media that he has symptoms consistent with Huntington's disease. Combined with Sasha's search of the crime scene and information from Watson's "Irregulars," the team realizes that Tanner is faking his insanity; having botched his "murder," the patient plans to commit suicide to preserve his family's life insurance. Watson then notices an additional symptom while foiling Tanner's suicide attempt and determines that he actually has Wilson's disease, which can be treated. To remove the bullet, Ingrid persuades former flame Isaac Niles (Hampton Fluker), who blames her for ruining his career, to operate. Isaac declines a job offer from Mary and warns her not to trust Ingrid. Johnson is approached by Moriarty's agent (Kacey Rohl), who has him switch out Watson's medication with an identical set of pills.
3	3	"Wait for the Punchline"	Christine Moore	Sallie Patrick	February 23, 2025	4.69
Aspiring comedian Molly Jones (Djouliet Amara) collapses while performing and comes to the Holmes Clinic; there, she explains how previous doctors had diagnosed her with epilepsy, but John then collapses himself. He sustains a second traumatic brain injury and begins hallucinating visions of Sherlock and of Moriarty's fused fingers. Watson accepts Molly as a patient and has Stephens look into her family history. He learns that "Molly" is actually Linda Mancini, daughter of convicted murderer Felicia Mancini (Lisa Arrindell). A visit to Felicia gives Watson vital clues and he identifies Molly's condition as that of long QT syndrome, which can cause sudden death. This insight also convinces him that Felicia was wrongfully convicted of drowning Molly's siblings. His own condition soon worsens, however, and the team forces him to return home. A guilt-ridden Shinwell is told he can switch Watson's pills back, curing him of the hallucinations. Molly undergoes surgery to fix her heart and evidence supplied by Watson enables the DA to initiate proceedings for releasing Felicia from prison. Mary visits Watson and warns him that she can no longer hide his condition from the hospital board. Meanwhile, Ingrid tries to get her spinal research project off the ground and Adam attempts to reconnect with Stephens.
4	4	"Patient Question Mark"	Ron Underwood	Teresa Tuan	March 2, 2025	4.04
During a team exercise to identify the clinic's next patient, Sasha diagnoses a rich lawyer (Michael Kostroff) with Cowden syndrome; while in surgery, the man dies on the table. Watson learns that, while attending medical school, Sasha worked on a cadaver that also had Cowden syndrome, which is both hereditary and difficult to detect, meaning others may be at risk. The cadaver is traced to an Amish community in Lancaster, where the team is informed that the deceased had a sister, Rachel Smith (Sprague Grayden), who was banished and now lives with her young son, Amos (Cruze McKinnon). When Amos starts having trouble breathing, Watson takes him in for treatment, but due to his TBI, cedes the operation to Ingrid. Sasha's efforts to have the Amish residents tested uncover more than a dozen cases of Cowden. Shinwell purchases a tracking device and plants it on the car of Moriarty's agent. He later retrieves it after seeing her with a sick young girl. Watson visits Mary at home and promises not to contest their divorce.
5	5	"The Man with the Glowing Chest"	Tara Nicole Weyr	Shardé Miller	March 9, 2025	4.84
Watson faces a serious dilemma while treating Taryn Quintyne (Brittany Adebumola), who suffers from a rare form of sickle cell anemia; Taryn can be cured, but the existing cure is prohibitively expensive and would render her infertile. With Shinwell's help, he recruits unscrupulous genetics researcher Hobie McSorley (Nat Faxon) (who had hacked his own genome to make his own chest luminescent) to devise a non-FDA-approved treatment using her bone marrow to replace the diseased cells and administer it to Taryn in secret. Despite efforts to keep the rest of the team in the dark, Stephens alerts them after recognizing Hobie's distinct birthmark. After reflecting on Watson's intentions, they collectively agree not to report him. Taryn suffers from complications just as Mary obtains proof of Watson's ethical violations. When she confronts him, Watson defends his decision and reveals that Taryn has become pregnant due to an unexpected failure of her IUD. Mary discharges her from the hospital and destroys the evidence. Ingrid turns to Sasha for help getting her sister Gigi (Kiera Allen) into the spinal project after running up against a hostile administrator. Stephens learns that Adam, who is in recovery for drug addiction, relapsed without his knowledge several years prior.
6	6	"The Camgirl Inquiry"	Bille Woodruff	Neal Dusedau	March 16, 2025	5.15
Stephens has a secret relationship with a camgirl named "Porsche" (Sofie Kane); when she collapses on a live feed, he asks the team for help. Thy spot various clues in the live feed of Porsche's apartment to try and find her address. Adam reaches out to his lawyer girlfriend Lauren (Amanda Crew), who also happens to be Stephens' ex. Porsche is ultimately found and brought to the hospital, but her health rapidly deteriorates from septic shock. Stephens recalls how Porsche once told him that she grew up on a rabbit farm in New Mexico; this reveals that her condition is undiagnosed bubonic plague from being bitten by an infected animal. As she recovers from the infection, she and Stephens amicably break up. Sasha buys a cake for Ingrid, who hates celebrating her birthday. Annoyed, Ingrid tells her off and questions why she should want to force happiness on others when she can't find it in her own life. That night, Sasha breaks up with her boyfriend upon realizing that he doesn't want to marry her.
7	7	"Teeth Marks"	Jennifer Lynch	Charly Evon Simpson	March 23, 2025	5.12
Librarian Ginny Roberts (Caitlin Stasey) stumbles into the clinic with a condition that causes her memory to "reset" every three minutes, repeatedly insisting that something is "eating" her from the inside. Shinwell is forced to once again switch out Watson's pills; this causes Watson to hear the voice of Sherlock Holmes (Matt Berry) inside his head. A screening reveals a teratoma in Ginny's ovaries. During surgery to remove it, Watson speaks with Mary, who reveals that she was pregnant when he left to help Sherlock on his final case; she lost the baby and chose not to tell him after he came home injured. Watson realises his meds have been tampered with, and suspects Shinwell. Moriarty arranges a suicide to deflect blame from Shinwell, as he still has use for him. He also visits Ingrid in secret and gives her human bones, saying that, soon, they will find out "who she really is."
8	8	"A Variant of Unknown Significance"	Larry Teng	Anna Mackey	March 30, 2025	5.28
Irene Adler (Whoopie Van Raam) seeks out the Holmes Clinic to treat her son Angus (Sebastian Billingsley-Rodriguez), claiming that he is Sherlock's biological child. Watson divides the team into two groups: Sasha and Adam are tasked with diagnosing Angus while Stephens and Ingrid must determine whether Irene is trying to deceive them. Despite being warned by a mistrustful Shinwell, Watson finds himself growing close to Angus after noticing how the boy's wit and insights match those of Sherlock. He suspects that Angus may be suffering from a genetic flaw that is hereditary to male members of the Holmes family. To prove this, he has Shinwell meet with Holmes' brother Mycroft (Vincent Gale) at the Diogenes Club to obtain the only known sample of Sherlock's DNA. The team learns that Irene has previously dabbled in charity fraud and realizes that Angus is deliberately faking his condition. Irene steals the DNA sample and attempts to fly to Austria, but Watson and Shinwell intercept her. Watson explains how he knows Irene, suffering from multiple myeloma, only wanted to sell the sample and provide for her son. Irene then asks him to assume guardianship of Angus in the event of her death. To her surprise, however, Watson offers her the chance to participate in the clinical trial of a treatment that could save her life.
9	9	"Take a Family History"	Mario Van Peebles	Teleplay by : Teresa Tuan & Craig Sweeny; Story by : Shäron Moalem & Craig Sweeny	April 13, 2025	4.97
In 2010, a teenage Ingrid (Amanda Arcuri) accompanies her father Ivo (Andy Bean) after Gigi (Beatrice Schneider) is brought in with a spinal injury from a fall. A high-risk surgery is needed to prevent her losing the use of her legs, but the surgeon, fearing a malpractice suit, refuses to authorize the procedure. A nurse (Kevin Vidal) puts Ingrid in touch with Mary, then a junior attending, and, when Ingrid explains that Gigi's injury was caused by the alcoholic Ivo's abuse, Mary arranges the surgery without permission. Upon being confronted by her boss (Martin Cummins), however, she reluctantly cancels the procedure and Gigi is left permanently disabled. In 2025, Ingrid is forced to have Gigi admitted to UHOP when she suffers complications from her spinal treatment. She attempts to solicit Watson and the team's help while keeping her sister's true identity a secret to avoid losing her job for conflict of interest. Watson deduces on his own that Gigi has a form of hypothermia, the result of a genetic mutation unknown to Ingrid that reacted with Gigi's treatment. For endangering a patient, Mary tells Ingrid that she will be fired and Watson makes it clear he will not oppose her decision. A flashback shows that, after promising to care for Gigi, Ingrid murdered her father with an overdose of fentanyl and buried the body.
10	10	"The Man with the Alien Hand"	Clara Aranovich	Theo Travers	April 20, 2025	4.47
Shinwell is ordered to collect DNA samples from all four members of the team for unknown purposes. Watson takes on Cameron Phipps (David Thompson) as a new patient; Phipps suffers from alien hand syndrome and has become increasingly desperate for treatment. Attempts to paralyze the hand with injections of neurotoxin fail and Phipps seemingly commits manslaughter by pushing his brother Damian (Corey Sorenson) in front of a moving bus. Watson meets with Lestrade (Rachel Hayward), the detective handling the case, and persuades her not to charge Phipps. He also sends for a highly regarded neurosurgeon to deaden the nerves of Phipps' hand and reverse his condition. However, a chance meeting reveals to Watson that Phipps is a failed entrepreneur facing bankruptcy and, with Damian's death, is now slated to inherit his ailing father's fortune. Unable to have him arrested, the team instead confronts Phipps with the revelation that his father had numerous children out of wedlock, all of whom will be equally entitled to a share of the man's estate. Shinwell turns over a collection of fake samples to Moriarty's agent. Lestrade is impressed with Watson's handling of the case and gives him her card; as they walk out, a man who had unknowingly helped Phipps orchestrate the murder suddenly arrives and offers to testify against him in exchange for an opportunity to intern at the Holmes Clinic.
11	11	"The Dark Day Deduction"	Sheelin Choksey	Jason Inman	April 27, 2025	4.59
Watson confronts a traumatic event from his Army days that still weighs heavily on him after his friend's wife reaches out, begging for help when her husband is seemingly having a psychotic break; Shinwell is asked for one last favour by Moriarty.
12	12	"My Life's Work Part 1"	Jeff W. Byrd	Teleplay by : Adam Samuel Goldman & Heather Ross; Story by : Shäron Moalem & Adam Samuel Goldman & Heather Ross	May 4, 2025	4.85
Moriarty infects Adam with a synthetically modified virus specifically programmed to attack his genes. During a dinner, he displays mild memory loss. Watson reveals to the team his new DNA database accumulated via donations from patients. A disguised Moriarty arrives at the clinic, forcing Ingrid to sabotage research samples in Watson's lab and promising to help her discover her true self. Adam's symptoms increase in severity and Stephens, too, becomes infected. Their condition is discovered to be an augmented form of HSV-1 which proves resistant to treatment. Shinwell (himself ailing thanks to Moriarty) finally confesses to Watson his involvement with Moriarty and his agent, revealing the doctor's own research has been turned against him. Adam falls into a coma and Stephens admits his feelings to Sasha before he, too, loses consciousness. Watson comes up with an experimental adeno-associated virus, but finds all his test samples ineffective owing to Ingrid's earlier sabotage. He is able to scramble together enough of a vector to make a working cure, but reveals to the team that it will only be enough to save one of the twins.
13	13	"My Life's Work Part 2"	Kristin Lehman	Teleplay by : Craig Sweeny & Teresa Tuan; Story by : Shäron Moalem & Sallie Patrick	May 11, 2025	4.74
A coin toss results in Adam being given the antidote. With only a few days left to save Stephens, Shinwell approaches Moriarty's agent Hannah Burke, promising the clinic will treat her young daughter Ashleigh (Logan Mae)'s brain tumor in exchange for access to his lab. As Ashleigh experiences nightly seizures, her oncologist Laila Bynum (Tika Sumpter) joins the team to help. Eventually, Watson diagnoses Ashleigh with MCAD and prescribes a diet of cornstarch to help her gain enough weight to commence chemotherapy. Moriarty makes further attempts to corrupt Ingrid, but she infects him using the same viral strategy he used on the Crofts. Watson promises to cure him if he'll hand over the needed vector. Stephens is cured and starts dating Sasha, the Crofts reconcile, Shinwell receives treatment for his own infection, and Ingrid leaves the clinic, having lost the team's trust after she confessed to tainting the vectors. Watson feels Moriarty is too dangerous to be allowed to walk away, so deliberately neglects to complete the cure and watches him die of a stroke. Two weeks later, Watson is now dating Laila and remains shaken by the fact he has taken a life.

=== Season 2 (2025–26) ===
No. overall	No. in season	Title	Directed by	Written by	Original release date	U.S. viewers (millions)
14	1	"A Son in the Oven"	Larry Teng	Teleplay by : Craig Sweeny; Story by : Shäron Moalem	October 13, 2025	2.53
While admitted for accidental self poisoning, Mary's mother, Elizabeth (Juanita Jennings), starts suffering rapid memory loss. Her ailment, found to be caused by an undiagnosed cirrhosis, makes her develop a urinary tract infection. Watson is unwilling to allow Mary to donate her liver due to the high risks. Watson discovers that Elizabeth gave birth to a son named Miles, whom she gave to another family. Mary meets her older brother (Khary Payton), who is reluctant to donate his liver to the mother he doesn't know. However, he changes his mind after recognising her as a regular customer who had talked him out of quitting his business during a rough patch. After the successful operation, Miles introduces Mary and Elizabeth to his wife and kids. Meanwhile, Ingrid has started group therapy at UHOP to deal with her antisocial personality disorder, and has an awkward reunion with the fellows. After coaxing from Shinwill to forgive Ingrid, the team recommends Watson rehire her. At Watson's apartment, he overhears an intruder, who is revealed to be Sherlock Holmes (Robert Carlyle).
15	2	"Back from the Dead"	Tara Nicole Weyr	Michael Narducci	October 20, 2025	2.37
Watson recounts his latest case to Holmes. A microbiology team led by Amelia Woodward (Kerry O'Malley) believe they've contracted an ancient and potentially catastrophic pathogen while in the arctic, with one dying from cardiac arrest. An expedition journal reveals the "virus" is actually typhoid fever brought about by baking soda put in the group's shared meals. An expedition member simulated the virus to create publicity and raise awareness for the melting permafrost. Holmes confesses he did not go over the Reichenbach Falls, instead tricking his nemesis Stapleton into fighting Moriarty in his place. Holmes then took the plunge himself to save Watson after he leapt in. Watson rehires Ingrid, and Sasha meets her long-lost birth uncle Jun (Tzi Ma) in person for the first time. When questioned on his motives for resurfacing, Holmes refers to "the Pittsburgh mystery" and teases a "third act surprise".
16	3	"Expletive Deleted"	Larry Teng	Elizabeth JB Klaviter	October 27, 2025	2.30
Max Bowers (Ava Anton) is 30 years old, but looks to be only 10. She is admitted for a fractured arm, requiring swift surgery. At group therapy Ingrid vents about her conflicted feelings of returning to the clinic, and meets fellow patient Beck Wythe (Noah Mills) before heading back to work. During the operation, Mary discovers lymph nodes on Max's arm, and Laila is brought in to consult. An exhausted Max is aware of her prognosis, and simply wants to die. Ingrid and Sasha uncover evidence of fever, indicating Max doesn't have cancer, but she checks out before she can be given the news. A conclusion of lupus is reached, and Max is caught by cops having stolen a car. She starts having difficulty breathing, and is convinced by Watson to return to the hospital where she responds well to treatment. She is later introduced to Pauline Bautiste (Berkeley James), a 41 year old woman with a similar condition, and overjoyed to find out she is no longer alone. Meanwhile, Sasha somewhat reconciles with Ingrid, who also diagnoses Stephens as having depression. On the way out, she is approached by Beck and rebuffs his suspicious attempts at socialising. Watson discovers an online newspaper called "the Mystery", seemingly referring to what Holmes mentioned previously.
17	4	"Happy When It Rains"	Sheelin Choksey	Charly Evon Simpson	November 3, 2025	2.42
In the aftermath of a tornado hitting the city, Shinwell, now a nurse in training, notices four patients turning up with similar oozing rashes on their bodies. He brings it to the team, who believe it to be a flesh eating bacteria. Instead, they are found to be fungal spores brought about by debris from the storm, but it is discovered too late to prevent one of the patients (Seyi Balogum) from getting his leg amputated. Another patient (Anja Savcic) starts worsening, with her condition discovered to be a sexually transmitted fungal infection amplified by flea bites. Meanwhile, Shinwell forms a rapport with his supervisor Nurse Carlin DaCosta (Margot Bingham) and struggles to adapt to the emotional toll of his new job. Adam is anxious about his impending marriage to Lauren, exacerbated by her announcing that she is pregnant.
18	5	"Lucky"	Guy Ferland	Teleplay by : Craig Sweeny; Story by : Craig Sweeny & Teresa Tuan	November 10, 2025	2.62
Controversies are reported at Diogenes Technology, a biotech company owned by Mycroft Holmes. Sherlock reveals to Watson that upon his "death", he deliberately bequeathed flawed chemical formulas to his brother, which now threaten to bankrupt Diogenes and other Big Pharma companies. While at Van Kirk Memorial Hospital, the team come across a patient named Lucky (Michael Bean) with locked in syndrome. Since 2020, travel nurse Haven Henry (Rebecca Field) has been killing patients by injecting them with insulin to induce hypoglycemia. Lucky has witnessed this, and eventually is able to identify her after she attacks him. The nurse flees to Hanoi, but Holmes calls in a fake bomb threat to ground the plane she is on, allowing US authorities to arrest her. At therapy, Ingrid clashes with Beck. She tries to get her mentor Ethan Schiff (Dean Paul Gibson) to arrange a BCI to help Lucky better communicate, but he has been let go from his company, and is unable to help. He is eventually rehired and able to proceed with a trial run, with Adam reaching out to help Ethan with his alcoholism. Beck reveals he was responsible for Ethan's rehiring, and Ingrid tentatively asks for his contact details. Det. Lestrade, the investigating officer on the case, befriends Lucky. Mycroft arrives with unwelcome news for the clinic's future.
19	6	"Buying Time"	Clara Aranovich	Anna Mackey	November 17, 2025	2.65
Following the previous episode, the clinic's funding is being cut as a result of Mycroft's business restructurings. 23 year old athlete Casey Zink (Chris Gray) is diagnosed with a spinal tumor at the same time that the wealthy and longevity-obsessed Joseph Bell (Johnno Wilson) makes an offer for Watson to join his anti-aging genetics company AAG. Watson reluctantly accepts Bell's offer on a trial basis in exchange for him paying for Casey's treatment. Casey is operated on while Bell makes Watson and Adam participate in promotional content for AAG. Casey's cancer cells start duplicating, which Stephens and Sasha discover to be due to genetic tinkering. Casey previously underwent a genetic study from the mysterious Primal BioTech, discovered to be a shell company owned by Bell. While visiting Bell, Adam and Shinwell steal some Primal samples, reworking it to kill Casey's tumor. Bell is revealed to have given himself the same treatment as Casey, unaware of the cancerous side effects, and is now sick himself. Casey makes a full recovery, while Bell dies. Stephens confides in Ingrid that he believes his deceased father died from suicide, and is thus reluctant to confirm his possible depression. Instead, he spends some time with a hospice patient (Cindy Piper). Mycroft reveals he is aware of Sherlock's survival, and demands that in exchange for leaving the clinic be, Watson give up his whereabouts.
20	7	"Giant Steps"	Amanda Row	Teresa Tuan	November 24, 2025	2.32
Watson's father Hamish (Clarke Peters) is a respected jazz musician, whose longtime protégé Annabelle Lee (Piper Curda) has been experiencing light headedness numbness and blackouts for some months. After she nearly collapses following a gig, she's brought to the clinic, where Hamish has an awkward reunion with his son. Despite a scheduled meeting with a record label, John admits her for tests against Hamish's protestations. Annabelle is diagnosed with moyamoya disease, in which her brain's arteries have narrowed, resulting in reduced blood flow; her blackouts have been triggered by the high amounts of air she has been using in her saxophone playing. She proves reluctant to undergo surgery due to fears it could affect her playing. She collapses from a stroke, but is successfully treated. Despite his initial misgivings about her potential loss of talent, a shaken Hamish persuades her to have the operation. Two months on, Annabelle makes good progress, and the Watsons reconcile. Meanwhile, Sasha has continued to connect with Jun, despite Ingrid's doubts of his legitimacy. After receiving a photograph of her birth mother from him, she eventually deduces that he is not in fact her uncle, although he asserts he can tell Sasha where to find her mother.
21	8	"Livvy Sees the Doctor"	Larry Teng	Teleplay by : Michael Narducci & Charly Evon Simpson; Story by : Jeffrey Paul King	December 1, 2025	N/A
Across eleven months, army veteran William "Fitz" Fitzgerald (Jon Beavers) repeatedly approaches the clinic, seeking aid for his fever ridden young daughter Livvy (Lucy Turnbull), who develop warts and sores. After constant referrals and being put aside due to patient overload, he takes the clinic (excluding Shinwell and Stephens) hostage wearing an explosive vest, and evaccuates the rest of the hospital. During a checkup from Ingrid, Livvy's spleen ruptures, resulting in a surgical team to be brought in, which Mary insists on leading. Beck, with whom Ingrid has been sleeping, is also present and tackles Fitz, before getting released from the hospital and soaking up the attention from the awaiting press. Livvy is finally diagnosed with XMEN disease, with Fitz donating T cells to formulate a treatment. Father and daughter share an emotional farewell before Fitz is led away by the police. Ingrid continues seeing Beck, despite warnings of his recklessness from Sasha, whom Beck is revealed to have started compiling information on.
22	9	"Shannon Says Bex Loves Micah"	Jennifer Lynch	Teleplay by : Shardé Miller & Jason Inman; Story by : Craig Sweeny	December 8, 2025	N/A
Laila's shy neurodivergent teenage son Micah (Chase W. Dillon) has developed a dependence on his AI chatbot called Shannon whom he imagines as a human figure resembling actress Shannon Purser. A stunt he pulls to ask his crush Bex (Juliette Hawk) out to the school formal, goes poorly and he is embarrassed. He notices a change in Bex's gait, and after a search for clues at her house leaves him hospitalised at UHOP with a fractured arm, Watson brings in psychiatrist Dr. Ivan Ferry (John Cassini), who is also Ingrid and Beck's group therapist, to consult. While cross-examining Bex, who suffered a recent head injury, she vomits and collapses due to a subdural hematoma, undergoing surgery to reduce the swelling. She has another seizure, with the cause attributed to Leigh syndrome, and is successfully treated. Micah is weaned off Shannon's influence, Shinwell continues to connect with Nurse Carlin, and Stephens asks Dr. Ferry to be his therapist.
23	10	"Never Been CRISPR'd"	Anton L. Cropper	Adam Samuel Goldman & Heather Ross	December 15, 2025	N/A
Hobie McSorley initiates a gene editing experiment to give himself and his girlfriend Wendy Goss (Jessica Miesel) matching luminescent heart-shaped marks on their arms. Wendy collapses and brought to the clinic, whereupon she seemingly suffers kidney failure. She admits that she underwent prior CRISPR treatment, which damaged her X chromosome and resulted in a G6PD deficiency, after which she developed Hemolytic anemia from ingesting fava beans, with her condition worsened by the antibiotics. A blood transfusion and a change of meds stop her deterioration, but she is discovered to be allergic to the bioluminescent proteins, resulting in Hobie reversing his glowing genes. Meanwhile, a dishevelled and erratic Holmes returns. Watson admits him for a neurology test, but he leaves before he can be examined. Concerned, Watson confesses Sherlock's survival to Shinwell. Lestrade reveals to Sasha that Jun has died; whereupon she decides to make contact with her birth mother. Ingrid confides in Adam about her conflicted feelings toward Beck, and upon his advice, breaks things off with him. Beck forges an email from Sasha's mother. Urged by Hobie to express his feelings to the person he truly loves, Watson goes to talk to Mary, only to walk in on her kissing her new boyfriend Josh Gibson (C.J. Lindsey).
24	11	"The Tunnel Under the Elms"	Sheelin Choksey	Jason Inman	March 1, 2026	N/A
A sinkhole opens up in Green Tree, leaving expectant couple Marnie (Madeline Zima) and Keith (Landon Liboiron) trapped as their car falls in. While treating those affected by the disaster, Watson overhears Keith's calls for help via the radio of 'Probie' (William Wilder), a volunteer firefighter. Keith and Marnie take refuge in a mining tunnel, where Marnie gives birth to baby Rose, who is black despite her parents both presenting as caucasian, with Marnie being adamant that she has not been unfaithful. They are found by search and rescue and brought to the clinic, where Marnie suffers a postpartum hemorrhage. Her surgery is a success and Watson confirms that Keith is indeed Rose's biological father after discovering they share inherited segmental heterochromia, and that Rose took after Keith's distant African ancestry. Meanwhile, Shinwell opens up to Carlin about his past criminal activities, and Beck sues Ingrid and the clinic, seeking compensation for alleged emotional distress following the hostage situation. Ingrid is forced to leave therapy as a result of Beck's machinations, and hooks up with Probie.
25	12	"A Family Meal"	Ruben Garcia	Teleplay by : Michael Narducci & Anna Mackey; Story by : Jeffrey Paul King	March 8, 2026	N/A
Wren Booker (Dani Alvarado) is diagnosed by Ingrid with a potential neurological condition. It is discovered that when she was twelve, she and her family were in a plane crash in the arctic, in which she and her brother Robin (Ashton Moio) were forced to consume the bodies of her family to survive. Wren concealed the truth of what they ate from her brother, and her subsequent social withdrawal following the guilt saw the siblings become estranged. Tests indicate Wren has kuru disease, a terminal condition and likely hereditary for Robin. Wren tries to kill herself, but is talked out of it by Ingrid. Robin is told everything, reconciles with Wren and introduces her to his daughter. Meanwhile, Adam and Lauren go in for an ultrasound and discover they are expecting triplets. With Lauren planning to drop out of work to look after the children, Adam will soon become the sole breadwinner, causing him further stress. Watson and Shinwell search for Holmes without success. The former receives a letter and the latter takes leave to continue the search.
26	13	"For a Limited Time Only"	Larry Teng	Bashir Gavriel	March 15, 2026	N/A
At church, Sasha meets Aubrey Kowalski (Tori Anderson) who collapses from an opioid overdose and seemingly dies upon reaching the hospital, only to resuscitate later, ostensibly from lazarus syndrome. Aubrey guilty confesses to stealing from her ex Beanie (Dave Davis) to fund her addiction, and is determined to raise funds to pay him back. She suffers a spontaneous coronary artery dissection, which appears to approve itself, followed by a acute pericardial inflammation. Her symptoms are finally found to be the result of a microchimerism following a miscarriage, with the team isolating the fetal cells to stop her inflammation. Beanie reaches out to express his forgiveness. Stephens and Ingrid have a heart-to-heart regarding their tragic pasts. Watson diagnoses Josh with coats' disease.
27	14	"Wrongful Life"	Jeff W. Byrd	Teleplay by : Elizabeth JB Klaviter & Charly Evon Simpson; Story by : Elizabeth JB Klaviter	March 22, 2026	N/A
In 2007, Watson gives patient Marlise Garner (April Parker Jones) the go-ahead to try conceiving. Her unborn child is diagnosed with a VSD, and she decides to carry through the pregnancy. In 2024, the fellows meet each other for the first time, along with fellow resident Paola Barajas (Michelle Veintimilla). Marlise's 16 year old son Kyren (Thamela Mpumlwana) has a VACTERL, requiring multiple surgeries since birth. In the present, Watson gives Kyren the final all-clear following a promised final operation. However, one of the rods implanted in his back breaks, requiring yet another surgery. During it, Mary discovers that during the 2024 operation (carried out by Paola), his spine failed to fuse. Anguished and embittered, Kyren sues for wrongful life. During a settlement conference, he displays a fever and collapses, upon which Watson diagnoses him with an occult spinal infection. Ingrid reaches out to Paola (who she got transferred to another hospital) to help develop a 3-D printed titanium replacement. Rather than continuing to pressure him with promises, Watson meets Kyren where he is, and the two reach an understanding. The suit is settled, and three months later, Kyren prepares for his next surgery.
28	15	"A Third Act Surprise"	Valerie Weiss	Charly Evon Simpson	March 29, 2026	N/A
Stephens attends the funeral of Mo Pitter, a hospice patient he befriended. After the eulogy, her daughter Hollis (Nadia Alexander) is given a checkup, where she's found to have kidney failure due to genetically inherited alport syndrome. Her father was a sperm donor, and Stephens discovers that she has 42 half-siblings, many of whom decline to donate. It is discovered that the anonymous donor is likely fertility doctor Oliver Day (Patrick Fabian). Watson and Lestrade confront him, resulting in his suicide. Hollis' haemodialysis catheter is removed due to an infection, greatly reducing the time available for donation. It's discovered that Day's identical brother Harrison also spread his own genes in competition with his brother. Harrison confesses and donates his kidney in exchange for full immunity. Watson finally reunites with Holmes, who works out unsolved murders, and gets Watson to tip-off Lestrade about them. After increasing concerns, Watson decides to introduce the detective to Lestrade, only for Holmes to be revealed as a hallucination.
29	16	"Respect the Process. Respect the Quirks"	Loren Yaconelli	Anna Mackey & Shardé Miller	April 5, 2026	N/A
Cora Davis (Annabelle Toomey), a 9 year old with supposed cancer is brought to Laila, who is unable to find any cancerous traces. Cora's overprotective and erratic mother Shelly (Anna Wood) flees the hospital and goes into hiding with her younger daughter Abby (Tegan Bradlee Arychuk). Sunlight exposure causes Cora's skin to instantly blister, which Ingrid diagnoses as potential Xeroderma pigmentosum, which is ruled out. Shelly (displaying similar symptoms) returns to break her out, but is calmed down by Watson, who reunites the siblings. The cause of the family's shared condition is traced to psoralen toxicity from overconsumption of celery. When Shelly is diagnosed with paranoid schizophrenia, her estranged sister Elena (Stephanie Izsak) offers to help. Ingrid starts reverting to her more callous behaviour, and is called out by Adam. She settles with Beck, in exchange for her being able to rejoin the therapy group without him. Beck, posing as Sasha's birth mother Shu-Yi, messages her and convinces her to divulge details about her work. He sends her a fake photo of her mother, making Ingrid, who had seen that same stock image on Beck's laptop during their earlier meeting, suspicious. Watson tries to dispel the hallucination of Holmes, who urges his friend to confesss to Laila about his lingering feelings for Mary, and hypothesises that the real Sherlock might still be alive somewhere. While driving at night with Laila, a distracted Watson swerves the car to avoid a deer and crashes, knocking himself and Laila out.
30	17	"Unsolved Mysteries"	Larry Teng	Adam Pasen & Sammy Horowitz	April 12, 2026	N/A
When the team arrive at work, Holmes appears, with the fellows already seeming familiar with him, and recognising him as their "second boss" in Watson's absence. Their new patient Reagan Anson (Sarah-Louise Collidge) was admitted following a shortness of breath and bronzed skin, and is sedated for brain swelling after hitting her head. Reagan is related to Malcolm Anson (Chris McGarry), who was Watson's mentor and the planned best man at his and Mary's 2010 wedding. After collapsing at the wedding rehearsal; Malcolm was initially diagnosed with viral myocarditis, believed to have caught it from young Reagan (Grace Nicolaou-Wood). On the day of the wedding, Malcolm seized and died. The team deduce the true cause was hereditary haemochromatosis from an iron overload. Lauren goes into pre-term labor from twin-to-twin transfusion syndrome, resulting in tragedy. It's revealed that the episode's events were an extensive hallucination Watson experienced while unconscious from the crash, with moments from the real world bleeding into the dream. Upon waking up, he is able to warn Adam about Lauren's early symptoms, and successfully treat Reagan. Upon recovering from her injuries, Laila sadly calls things off with Watson, realising his heart isn't in the relationship. Watson takes a CT scan, confirming his suspicions that the hallucinations of Holmes are the result of a brain tumor.
31	18	"Sic Semper Tyrannis"	Clara Aranovich	Michael Narducci	April 19, 2026	N/A
In the aftermath of his diagnosis, Watson goes on medical leave with Mary stepping in to head the clinic. After leaving an appointment accompanied by Lestrade, Watson is approached by South American dictator Rodrigo Freitas (Paul Moniz de Sa), who strong-arms the doctor into treating him. Watson returns to the clinic with Ingrid overseeing him. His diagnosis is stated as myasthenia gravis. Recognising he may be on borrowed time, Freitas demands Watson help designate a successor. The Crofts discover Freitas's skin moisturiser has been tainted by lipophilic beta blockers. Freitas's advisor Miguel Alvarado (Marco Grazzini) is responsible, having vainly hoped his decline would soften his tyrannical governing. The ailments, which are found to be LEMS and lung cancer, worsen drastically. Watson offers Freitas an experimental cancer treatment which could extend his life, necessitating a longterm stay in New York, and in exchange for Miguel being given amnesty. Watson admits his sickness to Shinwell via phone and tells him to call off the search for Sherlock and return home. While typing up a statement for her settlement with Beck, Ingrid is able to confirm he has an alternate account posing as Shu-Yi. She uses a hook-up as an excuse to pry at his apartment. She confronts him directly, and after he admits to staging Jun's overdose, tries to kill her. She overpowers him, but deciding he is too dangerous to live, gives in to her darker urges, and fatally stabs him, staging it as a self-defence killing.
32	19	"The Rule of Three"	Jennifer Lynch	Teresa Tuan	April 26, 2026	N/A
The day has come for Lauren's C-section. Ingrid has informed Sasha about Beck's scheme, but has yet to confess that her killing him was not in self defence. Tired of Watson putting off treatment, Mary takes him to Baltimore, to try and get on the waiting list for Isaac Niles, who has since become a highly prominent brain surgeon. While driving, he recollects an encounter with Lauren and Adam's OB-GYN Tabby Malena (Helen Cespedes), and concerned she has neurofibromatosis, calls Adam to warn him, though he is soon cut-off. The operation is already underway when Tabby collapses. Watson and Mary are diverted from the road by flash flooding warnings, stopping at a diner to get a signal. With Tabby's replacement delayed, intern Andy Tichenor (Derek Anderson) is forced to take over when one of the babies has increased heart decelerations, with Mary delivering instructions, while Sasha and Stephens are able to locate a paraganglioma in Tabby's body and stabilise her. Watson voices his worries about his operation potentially causing permanent cognitive impairment, while Mary informs him she's taken a job offer from UCLA. Replacement surgeon Michael Fiore (Alessandro Juliani) finally arrives and delivers the healthy babies, although Lauren suffers immense internal bleeding. With Watson's guidance, Adam and Tabby are able to determine she has DIC, for which she receives successful treatment. After the storm clears, Mary and Watson continue on to Baltimore. Lestrade pops by to follow up with Ingrid over her police statement regarding Beck's death. Carlin gets contaminated by a patient with HIV. Whilst waiting for test results, Shinwell confides his concern for Watson and his sadness at not finding Holmes. The tests come back negative and she proposes to Shinwell. He's interrupted by an ER patient who turns out to be the real Sherlock Holmes, although he is badly confused and fails to recognise Shinwell.
33	20	"The Cobalt Fissure"	Larry Teng	Teleplay by : Rebecca Hofherr; Story by : Rebecca Hofherr & Shäron Moalem	May 3, 2026	N/A
Following their appointment, Isaac insists on immediately admitting Watson. After the greatly disoriented Holmes is examined, with Wernicke's as a suspected condition, Shinwell texts Watson, who swiftly returns to Pittsburgh. Back at UHOP, a sniper shoots a nurse, seemingly randomly. The sniper, Moriarty's former lackey Colonel Sebastian Moran (Suzy Eddie Izzard), reveals he has been using the confused Holmes for some time, and threatens to kill Mary if he isn't cured. Sherlock loses consciousness for a time, with Watson himself experiencing a seizure soon after. Holmes recollects a previous case in which he and Watson chased a criminal across a radioactive testing site. Watson realises Holmes has CTX, but while successfully testing this hypothesis, Watson has another, more severe seizure. Sasha discovers Watson's theory, and the team treat Holmes with chenodeoxycholic acid. Shinwell tracks down and confronts Moran, culminating in his arrest, though Shinwell's relationship with Carlin is left strained as a result of his giving in to his violent urges. A non-responsive Watson awakens, with Holmes explaining that the radiation that mutated his genes also caused Watson's tumour. The Crofts connect over the newborn triplets, and Ingrid gives Sasha details about her birth mother. Overwhelmed by recent events, Sasha breaks up with Stephens. Ingrid has been allowed back into her therapy group, but must now contend with a suspicious Lestrade. The group share a moment with Watson, who recovers enough to reaffirm his love for Mary. The episode ends with Watson undergoing surgery, as he dreams of living with Mary at 221B Baker Street.

== Production ==
Watson was announced in October 2022, to be created, written and produced by Craig Sweeny who had previously worked on Elementary. The show was given a straight to series order, bypassing the pilot stage.

By January 2024, Morris Chestnut was attached to executive produce and star as the title character. Executive producer Larry Teng directed the first two episodes. In May 2024, Peter Mark Kendall and Ritchie Coster were announced as the first core cast additions. In June 2024, Rochelle Aytes was cast as Mary Morstan, followed by Eve Harlow and Inga Schlingmann. By July 2025, Robert Carlyle was cast in a recurring role as Sherlock Holmes. He is set to appear in roughly eight episodes.

Watson began shooting in Vancouver in June 2024, with filming locations including The Bridge Studios and the University of British Columbia campus. The shoot concluded on November 22, 2024. The show is set in Pittsburgh, where some exterior scenes were shot. The series is scored by Paul Leonard-Morgan.

On March 26, 2025, CBS renewed the series for a second season, which was originally set to premiere in January 2026, but was moved up to October 13, 2025 due to CIA being delayed. Unlike the first season, no location shooting took place in Pittsburgh. Filming for the second season began on June 24, 2025 and concluded on March 9, 2026. Leonard-Morgan has revealed that the season will consist of 20 episodes. On March 27, 2026, CBS canceled the series after two seasons.

== Release ==
The first episode had its worldwide premiere at MIPCOM Cannes on October 20, 2024. The series premiered on January 26, 2025, on CBS after the AFC Championship Game, and is streaming on Paramount+. The second season premiered on October 13, 2025. In Australia, the series airs on Network 10 and is streaming on Paramount+. In Canada, the series airs on Global and is streaming on StackTV. In the United Kingdom, it premiered on Sky Witness on November 24, 2025.

In Germany and Austria, the series premiered on Sky One from November 9, 2025.

== Reception ==
=== Critical response ===
The review aggregator website Rotten Tomatoes reported a 53% approval rating based on 19 critic reviews. The website's critics consensus reads, "Transplanting Sherlock Holmes lore into a medical procedural, Watson's conceit proves an awkward fit but gets a boost from the ever-watchable Morris Chestnut." Metacritic, which uses a weighted average, assigned a score of 54 out of 100 based on 16 critics, indicating "mixed or average" reviews.

=== Ratings ===
==== Season 1 ====
Viewership and ratings per episode of Watson
No.	Title	Air date	Rating/share (18–49)	Viewers (millions)	DVR (18–49)	DVR viewers (millions)	Total (18–49)	Total viewers (millions)	Ref.
1	"Pilot"	January 26, 2025	1.6/21	9.58	0.1	1.30	1.7	10.88	
2	"Red Coat"	February 16, 2025	0.3/3	4.32	0.1	1.97	0.4	6.28	
3	"Wait for the Punchline"	February 23, 2025	0.3/4	4.69	0.1	1.69	0.4	6.38	
4	"Patient Question Mark"	March 2, 2025	0.2/2	4.04	0.1	1.69	0.3	5.74	
5	"The Man With The Glowing Chest"	March 9, 2025	0.3/4	4.84	0.1	1.47	0.4	6.32	
6	"The Camgirl Inquiry"	March 16, 2025	0.3/4	5.15	0.1	1.63	0.4	6.77	
7	"Teeth Marks"	March 23, 2025	0.3/4	5.12	0.1	1.50	0.4	6.61	
8	"A Variant of Unknown Significance"	March 30, 2025	0.3/5	5.28	—N/a	—N/a	—N/a	—N/a	
9	"Take a Family History"	April 13, 2025	0.3/5	4.97	—N/a	—N/a	—N/a	—N/a	
10	"The Man with the Alien Hand"	April 20, 2025	0.2/3	4.47	—N/a	—N/a	—N/a	—N/a	
11	"The Dark Day Deduction"	April 27, 2025	0.2/4	4.59	—N/a	—N/a	—N/a	—N/a	
12	"My Life's Work Part 1"	May 4, 2025	0.3/3	4.85	—N/a	—N/a	—N/a	—N/a	
13	"My Life's Work Part 2"	May 11, 2025	0.2/3	4.74	—N/a	—N/a	—N/a	—N/a	

==== Season 2 ====
Viewership and ratings per episode of Watson
No.	Title	Air date	Rating/share (18–49)	Viewers (millions)	DVR (18–49)	DVR viewers (millions)	Total (18–49)	Total viewers (millions)	Ref.
1	"A Son in the Oven"	October 13, 2025	0.2/2	2.53	0.1	1.48	0.3	4.01	
2	"Back from the Dead"	October 20, 2025	0.2/2	2.37	0.1	1.38	0.3	3.75	
3	"Expletive Deleted"	October 27, 2025	0.1/1	2.30	0.1	1.33	0.2	3.73	
4	"Happy When It Rains"	November 3, 2025	0.1/2	2.42	0.1	1.28	0.2	3.70	
5	"Lucky"	November 10, 2025	0.1/2	2.62	0.1	1.39	0.2	4.01	
6	"Buying Time"	November 17, 2025	0.2/2	2.65	—N/a	—N/a	—N/a	—N/a	
7	"Giant Steps"	November 24, 2025	0.1/2	2.32	—N/a	—N/a	—N/a	—N/a	
