= I Am the Man =

I Am the Man may refer to:

== Film ==
- I Am The Man (film), 1924 film with Flora Le Breton and Lionel Barrymore

== Music ==
- I Am the Man (album), by Simone White, 2007

=== Songs ===
- "I Am The Man", single by The Philosopher Kings from Famous, Rich and Beautiful 1997
- "I Am The Man", song by Neal Morse from One
- "I Am The Man", single by Nicolay (musician) 2006
- "I Am The Man", song by The Hitmen Australia 1979
- "I Am The Man", song by The Rebels (surf band)
