= Simone White =

American musician

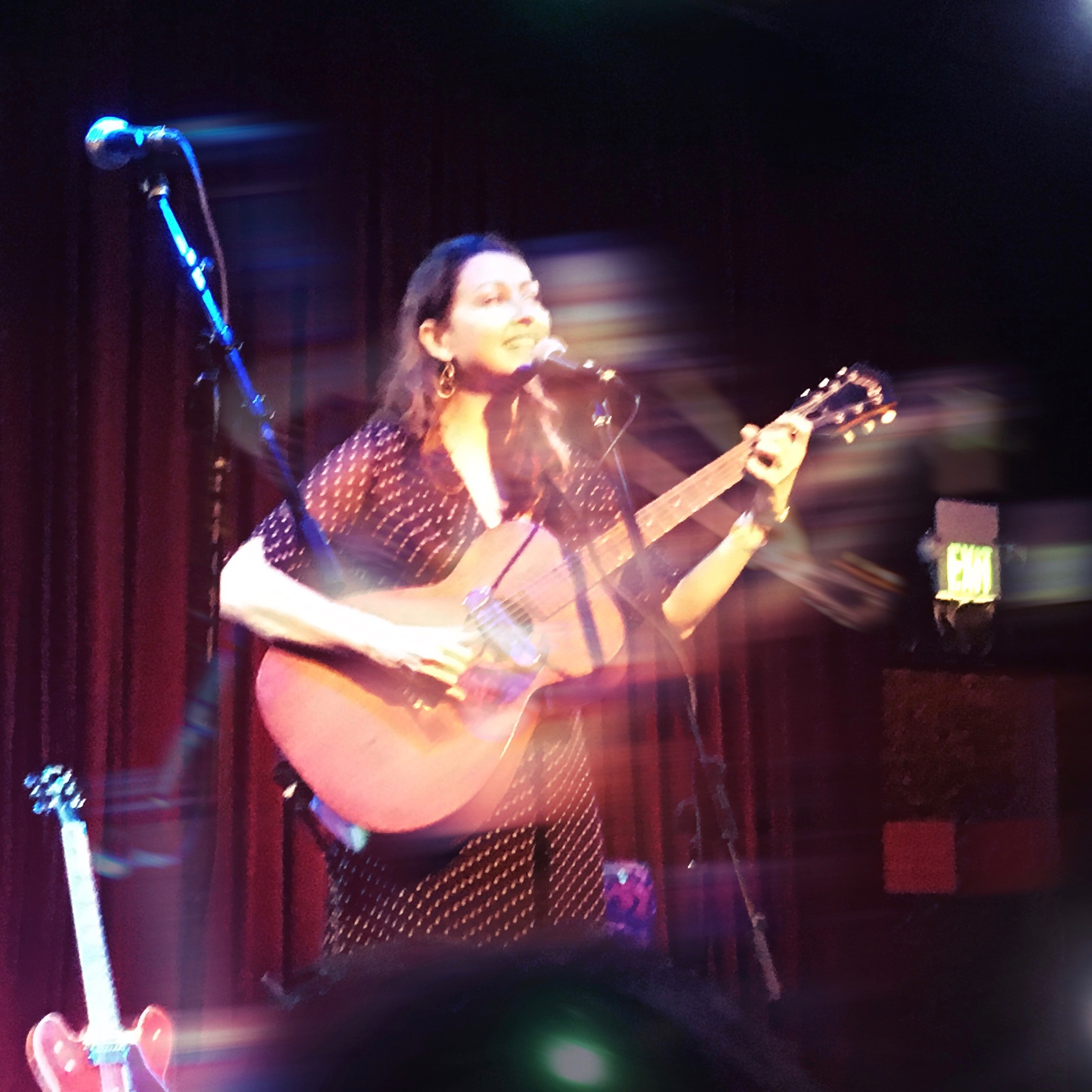
- Performing in 2019

Background information
- Born: February 7, 1970 (age 56)
- Origin: Oahu, Hawaii
- Instruments: Guitar, vocals
- Years active: 2000 to present
- Label: Honest Jon's
- Website: simonewhite.com

Simone White (born February 7, 1970) is an American singer-songwriter.

== Life and career ==
Simone White appeared in the 1984 comedy-drama "The Wild Life" written by Cameron Crowe and directed by Art Linson. Eddie Van Halen and Donn Landee composed the film's score.

White moved to NYC from London in 2000 where she began to play music onstage. She recorded her first album with producer David Domanich and musician and friend Frank Bango. White released the album, The Sincere Recording Company Presents, in 2003 on Bango's label The Sincere Recording Company. White's albums have included covers of songs originally recorded by Frank Bango, such as Roses Are Not Red, Wrong About You, Worm Was Wood and Bunny in a Bunnysuit, the latter of which was used in the soundtrack of the 2013 drama comedy The Pretty One.

I Am The Man, her second album, was recorded with producer Mark Nevers, (Lambchop/Calexico/Will Oldham/Silver Jews), in Nashville, Tennessee. In 2006 she was signed to the UK label Honest Jons. I Am The Man was released by Honest Jons/EMI in the UK, Japan, Italy and The Netherlands in 2007 and released in France, Germany and the United States in 2008 through distributors Indigo and Forced Exposure.

'The Beep Beep Song', one of the songs from White's second album I Am The Man, was used in an Audi R8 advert in the UK, France, Italy, the Netherlands, Poland, Estonia, Latvia, Lithuania, South Africa, Sweden and was shown in the half time ad break of the Rugby World Cup Final of 2007.

White has toured in the United Kingdom, Europe and Japan headlining and supporting various bands: Nouvelle Vague, Alela Diane, Teitur, Stephen Fretwell, Little Dragon, Victoria Williams and Shugo Tokumaru. In 2008 she played at the festivals Greenman and WOMAD in the UK. In the US she has opened for Andrew Bird, Mark Eitzel, Thao Nguyen, John C Reilly & Friends and The Posies.

White was a part of Damon Albarn's critically acclaimed "Honest Jons Revue" which toured in July 2008 to the Barbican Center in London, Les Nuits de Fourvière festival in Lyon, and the Lincoln Center Festival in New York City. The Honest Jons Revue included the artists Tony Allen, The Hypnotic Brass Ensemble, Damon Albarn, Kokanko Sata Doumbia, Lobi Traore, Afel Bocoum, Candi Staton, Simone White and Victoria Williams.

On June 12, 2009, White's third album, Yakiimo was released digitally, with a physical release following on June 22, 2009. This album was again released through Honest Jons in the UK.

'Bunny in a Bunnysuit', from the album Yakiimo, was used in the Omega Ladymatic watch ad campaign, featuring Nicole Kidman.

White's fourth album, Silver Silver, was released on May 22, 2012, on Honest Jon's and is a collaboration with the producers Adam Samuel Goldman and Julian Wass from Fol Chen.

White released Genuine Fake, a collection of acoustic recordings, on September 8, 2017. The album features re-recordings of 14 old tracks alongside 3 new ones. It was initially available digitally through Bandcamp, with a vinyl edition released in November 2017.

Letter to the Last Generation, White's fifth studio album, was released digitally on October 18, 2019. it was reissued on vinyl on December 4, 2020, through Fetch Happened Records in the UK. The vinyl release includes two new recordings, the first of which, Blueprint was released as a digital single on 27 November 2020.

== Discography ==
=== Albums ===
- The Sincere Recording Company Presents Simone White (Sincere Recording Co., 2003)
- I Am The Man (Honest Jons, 2007)
- Yakiimo (Honest Jons, 2009)
- Silver Silver (Honest Jons, 2012)
- Kassem Mosse/Simone White "Three Versions" (EP remix, Honest Jon's 2015)
- Genuine Fake (Self-Released, 2017)
- Letter to the Last Generation (Self-Released, 2019)
- "Dream Comfort Memory" (Fetch Happened Records, 2021)

=== Singles ===
- Don't Turn Your Back On Love (single, self-release, 2015)
- Christmas Makes Me Blue (version, single, self-release, 2015)
- Tiny Drop (feat Andrew Bird), (single, self-release, 2018)

=== Featured Vocalist and Songwriter ===
- Dive Index- Lost in the Pressure (album, 2014)
- The Happening- Miles Away From America (album, 2016)
- Reinier Zonneveld- Archive (single, 2016)
- Reinier Zonneveld- You Could Be the One I Want (single, 2016)
- Reinier Zonneveld- "Interference" (single, 2016)

=== Featured Guest Vocalist ===
- The Wedding Present, Holly Jolly Hollywood, (Scopitones, 2008)
- Fol Chen, The Longer U Wait (Featuring Simone White), (Asthmatic Kitty, 2009)
- Fol Chen, Adeline (You Always Look So Bored), Part II: The New December, (Asthmatic Kitty, 2010)
- Fol Chen, The Holes, Part II: The New December, (Asthmatic Kitty, 2010)
- Fol Chen, The Holograms, Part II: The New December, (Asthmatic Kitty, 2010)
- Fol Chen, I Walked (Featuring Simone White), Sufjan Stevens cover, (Asthmatic Kitty, 2011)
- The Empress of the Blues- A Tribute to Bessie Smith (Back Water Blues", Reimagine Music 2014)
- The Essentials featuring Simone White (album, self-release, 2017)

=== Compilation contributions ===
- 2006 'The American War' – The Sound the Hare Heard (Kill Rock Stars compilation disc)
