= Heick =

Heick is a surname. Notable people with the surname include:

- Aaron Heick (born 1961), American saxophonist and woodwind player
- Annette Heick (born 1971), Danish television personality, journalist, singer and voice actress
- Keld Heick (born 1946), Danish singer-songwriter and musician
- William Heick (1916–2012), American photographer and film director
