= Godmonster of Indian Flats =

1973 horror western film directed by Fredric Hobbs

- 2018 Blu-ray release cover
- Directed by: Fredric Hobbs
- Written by: Fredric Hobbs
- Produced by: Robert S. Bremson
- Starring: Christopher Brooks; E. Kerrigan Prescott; Karen Ingenthron; Stuart Lancaster
- Cinematography: William Heick
- Edited by: Richard S. Brummer
- Music by: Henri Price
- Production companies: Bremson International, Inc.
- Distributed by: Ellman Film Enterprises
- Release date: December 31, 1973
- Running time: 81 minutes
- Country: United States
- Language: English
- Budget: $135,000

Godmonster of Indian Flats is a 1973 American exploitation Western horror film written and directed by Fredric Hobbs, and starring Christopher Brooks, E. Kerrigan Prescott, Karen Ingenthron and Stuart Lancaster. Set in a mining and "Old West" tourism community in northern Nevada, the plot depicts the accidental creation of a giant sheep monster that terrorizes the town, as well as a plot about race relations in the 1970s American West.

The film received little to no theatrical release, but has seen multiple home video (VHS, DVD, video on-demand and Blu-ray disc) runs by genre film distributors in the 45 years since its production.

== Plot ==
In an old mine outside of Reno, Nevada, a local rancher named Eddie discovers a large mutated sheep embryo. Scientist Professor Clemens and his assistant Mariposa take the embryo to his laboratory. Clemens reveals that he came to the area to investigate the mines due to their role in a local legend about a large monster that haunted the area. He discovers that the mine where the monster was found gives off phosphorus vapors which may have caused the mutation. Clemens puts the embryo into an incubation chamber, where it grows into an eight-foot-tall mutant sheep monster.

Meanwhile, in town, a wealthy East Coast Black man named Barnstable attempts to purchase some real estate for mining development on behalf of his employer Rupert Reich. However, Barnstable is prevented from doing so by the town's mayor, Charles Silverdale, who wants to preserve the town for "Old West" tourism. Mayor Silverdale frames Barnstable for killing a dog (which was actually sent to a nephew in Albuquerque) and gathers a crowd which attempts to lynch him. Barnstable evades the mob.

The monster escapes from Clemens' lab, and starts wandering the area, where it frightens several children, scares the local population, and causes a man to blow up his own gas station. After it is captured, the mayor attempts to reveal the monster in a cage as the "Eighth Wonder of the World". The stunt does not work, however, as the townspeople are instead angry that the mayor has sold their land claims. The crowd pushes several cars over a cliff and onto a garbage dump, including one with the Godmonster in a cage.

The caged Godmonster explodes, and Barnstable flees. The final scene shows more mutant sheep being born while Silverdale tirades:

AN EYE FOR AN EYE! VIOLENCE IN THE NAME OF JUSTICE CONTROLS THE MASSES! IT ALWAYS HAS! DO YOU HEAR ME, BARNSTABLE? I BEATEN YOU! TIME IS THE ETERNAL JUDGE OF EVENTS! DO YOU HEAR ME, BARNSTABLE? DO YOU HEAR ME? I BEATEN YOU, BARNSTABLE! BARNSTABLE!

== Cast ==
- Christopher Brooks as Barnstable
- E. Kerrigan Prescott as Prof. Clemens
- Karen Ingenthron as Mariposa
- Stuart Lancaster as Mayor Charles Silverdale
- Richard Marion as Eddie
- Peggy Browne as Mme. Alta
- Steven Kent Browne as Philip Maldove
- Robert Hirschfeld as Sheriff Gordon

== Production ==
The film was directed by outsider artist Fredric C. Hobbs whose previous works include Alabama's Ghost, which also starred Brooks, the "modern morality play" Troika and Roseland, the latter he called "a metaphysical skin-flick" and "philosophical fuck film".

It was shot on location in Virginia City, Nevada (where Hobbs was also the owner of the city's real life Silver Dollar Hotel).

== Reception and legacy ==
Godmonster of Indian Flats had a small theatrical release, but was released for home video by Something Weird Video (SWV), on VHS in 1996 and DVD in 2001. It has achieved something of a cult film status, regularly reviewed by small reviewers for being "So bad it's good." Many reviewers note the strange relationship of the intertwined plots, which hardly intersect until late in the runtime, and the film's hectic final scene, which suddenly ends the film. Others have noted the film for being a well written, interesting look on race relations in the western United States in the 1970s, in addition to its fun, B-movie horror elements. Jerry Renshaw of The Austin Chronicle described the film as "quite a bit more bizarre than I can describe" and "truly stupefying", describing the titular monster as "Sesame Street's Snuffleupagus with Joe Camel's face, ratty fun-fur on its body, one very short arm and one ridiculously long, dangling arm, walking on its hind legs and tottering around the wasteland."

Annalee Newitz of Gizmodo, however, called it "a terrific and obscure entry in the pollution mutant genre" and noted that:

"Like Alligator, this is good political satire masquerading as a cheesy monster movie, and it well please you by succeeding at being both smart and gooftastic"

A 35mm print of Godmonster has been archived by the American Genre Film Archive, who scanned the print and released the film in 4K on Blu-ray disc in 2018.

RiffTrax, consisting of former Mystery Science Theater 3000 alumni Michael J. Nelson, Bill Corbett and Kevin Murphy, riffed the film on March 23, 2018 claiming it to be one of the "weirdest" movies ever made.

== See also ==
- American independent cinema
- B movies (exploitation boom)
- Weird West
- Eco-horror
- Westworld - 1973 techno-Western film similar in content
