= Bedroom Walls =

American pop rock band

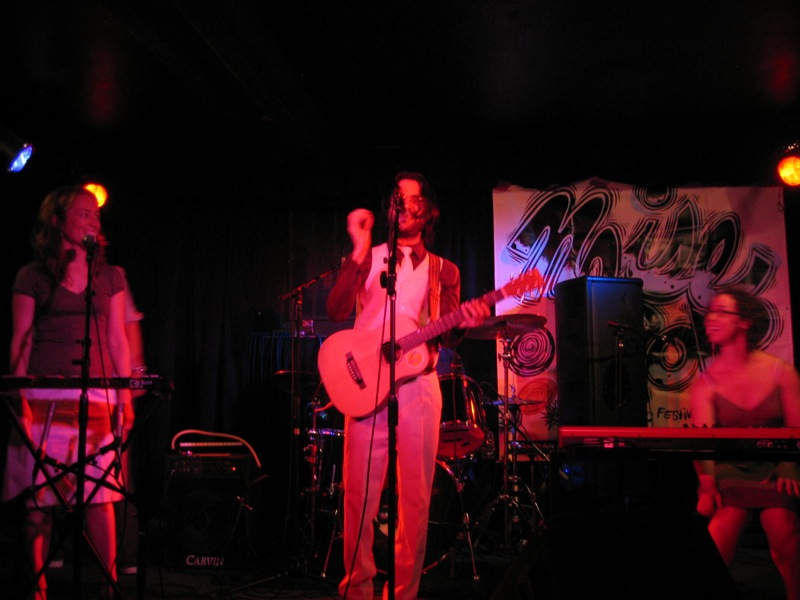
- Bedroom Walls performing live in 2006.

Background information
- Origin: Los Angeles, California, United States
- Genres: Pop rock, alternative rock
- Years active: 2001–2007
- Past members: Adam Samuel Goldman; Melissa Thorne; Julian Gross; Sean Hoffman; Vanessa Kaufman; Kris Canning; Aurisha Smolarski

Bedroom Walls was an American pop rock band active from 2001–2007 in Los Angeles, California. It was formed in 2001 by Adam Samuel Goldman (later of Fol Chen) on guitar/vocals, with keyboardist/vocalist Melissa Thorne and drummer Julian Gross (now of Liars).

The band released two full-length albums of self-described "Romanticore" music, a genre founded on what they describe as "staring at the ceiling; sedatives; stale cake for breakfast; sighing too loudly; knowing your ex-girlfriend is happier now." “Some people don’t see any humor in it, but it’s supposed to be a little funny,” Goldman explained in a 2004 interview. "Sad music fails when there isn’t a little bit of absurdity to it or black comedy to it."

After the release of their debut album, I Saw You Coming Back To Me (2003), the lineup expanded to include Vanessa Kaufman (replacing Gross on drums), Sean Hoffman (guitar/glockenspiel), Kris Canning (bass), and Aurisha Smolarski (violin). Bedroom Walls performed live on KCRW's Morning Becomes Eclectic in December 2003, citing influences like Aztec Camera and The Durutti Column, and opened for bands including American Music Club and Arthur Lee & Love.

The second LP, All Good Dreamers Pass This Way (2006), was described by one critic as "a parchment origami of wide-ranging pop influences, all bright melodies, overcast arrangements and grown-up feelings." It featured the songs "In Anticipation of Your Suicide," (which appeared in the 2006 film All The Boys Love Mandy Lane), "Kathy in Her Bedroom," and "Do the Buildings and Cops Make You Smile?"
