= Julian Wass =

- Born: November 10, 1981 (age 44)
- Origin: Los Angeles, California, U.S.
- Genres: Film score, experimental, indie rock, hip hop
- Occupations: Musician, composer
- Instruments: Guitar, piano, drums, synthesizer, flute, bass
- Years active: 2006–present
- Website: www.julianwass.com

Julian Wass (born November 10, 1981) is an American television writer, director, film composer, producer, and electronic musician from Los Angeles, California. He is the son of actors Janet Margolin and Ted Wass.

== Music for films ==
Julian Wass first came to prominence with his score for Katie Aselton's The Freebie, which premiered at the 2010 Sundance Film Festival. Subsequent scores include the Rudy-influenced brass score for Mark and Jay Duplass' The Do-Deca-Pentathlon, the marimba inflected Hit and Run, directed by Dax Shepard, and the "gauzy" analog synthesizer score for his wife Jenée LaMarque's feature debut The Pretty One.

== Television writing and directing ==
While working as the composer on the HBO series Room 104, Wass began to write and direct episodes of the series, the first being a musical episode co-written with Mark Duplass and starring Brian Tyree Henry.

== Production work ==
Wass co-produced all three Fol Chen albums, and in 2011, collaborated with bandmate Adam Samuel Goldman to co-produce Los Angeles based singer-songwriter Simone White's fourth album, Silver Silver. The same year, he produced three tracks for the Main Attrakionz mixtape Blackberry Ku$h; Wass would later co-produce, along with .L.W.H., their critically acclaimed album Chandelier in its entirety.

In 2013, Wass collaborated with Lefse Records to release the compilation MITSUDA, a tribute to the Japanese video game music composer Yasunori Mitsuda, which featured beats from Ryan Hemsworth and Friendzone, based on samples from Mitsuda's soundtracks.

== Discography ==
=== Film scores ===
- Noah's Arc: Jumping the Broom (2010) (with Adam Goldman)
- The Freebie (2010)
- Brother's Justice (2010)
- The Do-Deca-Pentathlon (2012)
- Nesting (2012)
- Hit and Run (2012)
- Beauty CULTure (2012) (as Fol Chen)
- Teddy Bears (2013)
- The Pretty One (2013)
- The Motivation (2013)
- Lost for Life (2013)
- Ride (2014)
- The Overnight (2015)
- 6 Years (2015)
- Other People (2016)
- Blue Jay (2016)
- The Miseducation of Cameron Post (2018)

=== Albums ===
- Crystals (2011, Self-released)
- MITSUDA (2013, Lefse Records)

=== Productions ===
- Fol Chen – Part I: John Shade, Your Fortune's Made (Asthmatic Kitty, 2009)
- Fol Chen – Part II: The New December (Asthmatic Kitty, 2010)
- Main Attrakionz – Blackberry Ku$h (2011)
- Main Attrakionz – Chandelier (2011)
- Simone White – Silver Silver (Honest Jons, 2012)
- Fol Chen – The False Alarms (Asthmatic Kitty, 2013)
