= Jenée LaMarque =

American writer and director (born 1980)

Jenée LaMarque (born February 2, 1980, in West Covina, California) is an American writer and director, known for The Pretty One (2013), Spoonful (2012) and The Feels (2018).

== Career ==
LaMarque acted in local theatre while growing up in Claremont, California. She got a degree in English with a creative writing emphasis in poetry from Stanford University. Screenwriting proved to be the combination of these two interests. She took UCLA extension classes in Screenwriting, before getting her MFA in Screenwriting from the AFI Conservatory. At AFI she wrote The Pretty One. LaMarque wrote and directed the short Spoonful, which premiered at the Sundance Film Festival in 2012. The Pretty One script was on The Black List in 2011, which helped LaMarque enlist top talent like Zoe Kazan playing both twins, and Jake Johnson, who plays her love interest. LaMarque was a finalist for the Tribeca Film Festival's award "The Nora" in 2013. The Pretty One was nominated for the 2014 Best Movie By a Woman by the Women Film Critics Circle. The Pretty One won Best Narrative Feature and Jenée won Best Director at the 2013 Savannah Film Festival.

Jenée's second feature The Feels starring Constance Wu, Angela Trimbur and Ever Mainard premiered in competition at The 2017 Seattle Film Festival. The Feels’ Ever Mainard won Best Actress at the 2017 Outfest and won Best Narrative Feature at the 2017 NewFest.

== Filmography ==
=== Film ===
Year	Title	Role	Notes
2012	Spoonful	Director, writer	Short film
2013	The Pretty One	Director, writer	
2018	The Feels	Director, writer	Co-wrote with Lauren Parks; Played Nikki

=== Television ===
Year	Title	Role	Notes
2019–20	Vida	Director	7 episodes
2019–20	Room 104	Director, writer	Wrote and directed "Rogue", "Bangs", and "The Night Babby Died"
2019	Sorry for Your Loss	Director	"Thirty Years"
2020	Party of Five	Director	"Authentic Mexican"
2021	Run the World	Director	"Plus Ones", "What You Wish For", and "Almost, Lady, Almost!"
2022	As We See It	Director	"Please Don't Leave"
2022–23	Julia	Director	4 episodes
2022	P-Valley	Director	"Snow"
2022	Dead to Me	Director	"Look at What We Have Here" and "Where Do We Go Now?"
2023	The Big Door Prize	Director	"Giorgio" and "Izzy"
2024	Based on a True Story	Director	"Double Fault" and "Based on a Drew Story"

== Personal life ==
LaMarque has been married to Julian Wass since November 4, 2006. They have two children. She is Mexican American.

== See also ==
- List of female film and television directors
- List of LGBT-related films directed by women
