= Flipside (film) =

2023 American documentary

- Directed by: Chris Wilcha
- Written by: Chris Wilcha; Adam Samuel Goldman; Joe Beshenkovsky
- Produced by: Joe Beshenkovsky; Michelle Currinder; Alex Fisch; Adam Samuel Goldman; James A. Smith; Chris Wilcha
- Cinematography: Adam Beckman
- Edited by: Joe Beshenkovsky; Claire Ave'Lallemant
- Music by: Adam Samuel Goldman; Rafter Roberts
- Production companies: Deep Cut; Every Other; Exploded View; Apatow Productions; Infinite Films; Park Pictures
- Release date: 2023
- Running time: 92 minutes
- Country: United States
- Language: English
- Box office: $52,247

Flipside is a 2023 feature documentary film directed by Chris Wilcha.

The film is a semi-sequel to The Target Shoots First his 1999 72-minute documentary CalArts MFA thesis film about his work at Columbia House record club. that was a winner at Slamdance Film Festival for best documentary feature and best editing.

== Plot ==
"When filmmaker Chris Wilcha revisits the record store he worked at as a teenager in New Jersey, he finds the once-thriving bastion of music and weirdness from his youth slowly falling apart and out of touch with the times. FLIPSIDE documents his tragicomic attempt to revive the store while revisiting other documentary projects he has abandoned over the years...." IFC Center

== Release ==
The film premiered at the Toronto International Film Festival on September 10, 2023. In 2024, after screening at various documentary festivals and a limited release in New York and Los Angeles, it was made available on streaming platforms.

== Reception ==
Festival programmer Thom Powers describes it as "a comic yet deeply moving reflection on opportunities lost and gained".

(4 stars) "The director’s wise and discursive narration, which worms its way from regret about life’s disappointments to gradual acceptance of the compromises we all make, ties together the film’s subject matter with the skill and vision of a novelist, weaving together threads about creativity; doing what one loves vs. what one must; the impulse to hold on to the past, ever at war with the need to let go and move on; growing up and growing old; finding purpose; selling records and selling out; and discovering a kind of bliss in the cracks between." - Washington Post
