= The Feels (film) =

2017 film by Jenée LaMarque

- Directed by: Jenée LaMarque
- Screenplay by: Jenée LaMarque; Lauren Parks
- Starring: Constance Wu; Angela Trimbur; Josh Fadem; Jenée LaMarque; Ever Mainard
- Cinematography: Kristin Fieldhouse
- Edited by: Steph Zenee Perez
- Production company: Provenance Pictures
- Release date: 9 June 2017
- Running time: 90 minutes
- Country: United States
- Language: English

The Feels is a 2017 dramedy film directed by Jenée LaMarque. Starring Constance Wu, Angela Trimbur, Josh Fadem, and LaMarque, the film follows a group of friends who set out on a lesbian bachelorette weekend.

== Plot ==
For the upcoming nuptials of Andi and Lu, a group of friends celebrate during bachelorette weekend. Under the influence of alcohol, Lu admits to everyone that she has never had an orgasm, to Andi's complete surprise and dismay. The fun weekend is derailed in unexpected ways, causing everyone to reflect on subjects such as trust, love, and their first orgasms.

== Cast ==
- Constance Wu as Andi / Bride
- Angela Trimbur as Lu / Bride
- Josh Fadem as Josh
- Jenée LaMarque as Nikki / Lu's sister
- Ever Mainard as Regular Helen
- Lauren Parks as Vivien
- Kárin Tatoyan as Kárin

== Reception ==
Variety critic Dennis Harvey called the film "uneven but pleasing", predicting a target audience following in LGBT circles, and modest mainstream success. He concluded that the film fell somewhat short as a drama, because it didn't reach the necessary depth of the characters, but that "as a comedy, The Feels has considerable sprightly appeal, although it could have used slightly more assertive visual packaging. The dialogue and scene rhythms have a nice, loose, improvisational feel, and Steph Zenee Perez's editing maintains a bright pace." Cinema365 also gave the film a mixed review: The critique found it refreshing to see lesbians given the front and center of a film, as "often Hollywood tends to give the lesbian community short shrift, relegating them to supporting roles or comedy relief. Very rarely are any films told from a lesbian point of view even in independent films as this one is." The review called upon mainstream audiences to view it, and not see it as a lesbian niche work. On the negative side, however, this review also found the drama of the film "manufactured rather than earned."

Womentainment, on the other hand, gave the films an enthusiastic, unreserved "go watch it now!". Reviewer Karina H. Adelgaard found all the characters likable, enjoyed the "lesbian drama", and especially commended the film for being a lesbian drama with a happy ending.

== Awards ==
Year	Award	Category	Nominee	Result
2018	Cleveland International Film Festival	Best American Independent Feature	Jenée LaMarque	Nominated
2018	Cleveland International Film Festival	ReelWomenDirect Award for Excellence in Directing by a Woman	Jenée LaMarque	Nominated
2017	L.A. Outfest	Outstanding Actress in a Feature Film	Ever Mainard	Won
2017	Long Beach QFilm Festival	Outstanding Performance	Ever Mainard	Won
2017	NewFest: New York's LGBT Film Festival	Best Feature	The Feels	Won
2017	Seattle International Film Festival	New American Cinema Competition	Jenée LaMarque	Nominated

== See also ==
- List of LGBT-related films directed by women
