= The Pretty One =

- Theatrical release poster
- Directed by: Jenée LaMarque
- Written by: Jenée LaMarque
- Produced by: Robin Schorr; Steven J. Berger
- Starring: Zoe Kazan; Jake Johnson; Ron Livingston; Sterling Beaumon; John Carroll Lynch
- Cinematography: Polly Morgan
- Edited by: Kiran Pallegadda
- Music by: Julian Wass
- Production companies: Provenance Pictures; RCR Pictures
- Distributed by: Dada Films
- Release dates: April 20, 2013 (TFF); February 7, 2014 (limited)
- Running time: 90 minutes
- Country: United States
- Language: English
- Box office: $13,769

The Pretty One is a 2013 comedy drama film directed and written by Jenée LaMarque. The film stars Zoe Kazan, Jake Johnson, Ron Livingston, Sterling Beaumon and John Carroll Lynch.

== Plot ==
Laurel and Audrey (Zoe Kazan) are identical twins. Although they look the same on the outside, their personalities are very different, with Audrey being popular, sophisticated and successful while Laurel is shy, childlike, awkward and still living at home with their widowed father (John Carroll Lynch) and his new fiancée, and helping him with his work of reproducing famous paintings. At their birthday party, Audrey persuades Laurel to come and live with her. In preparation for the move, Laurel gets a new haircut that makes her look like her sister. Returning from the hair salon, they get in a severe car crash together, and when Laurel wakes up in the hospital, she is informed that her sister has died. Suffering from post-traumatic amnesia, Laurel doesn't remember who she is at first. Due to her new haircut and the fact that the deceased's body was burned beyond recognition following the accident, everybody assumes she's actually Audrey. The morning of Laurel's funeral, she remembers her actual identity but decides to keep everyone thinking that Laurel was the one who died in the crash, especially when she sees that nobody at her funeral has anything to say about her.

Laurel flies back to the city where Audrey used to live and work as a real estate agent. There, she meets her late sister's tenant, Basel (Jake Johnson), who is confused about Audrey's sudden change of personality, because Audrey was never nice to him before. While posing as her sister, she learns that Audrey had a married boyfriend, Charles (Ron Livingston), but broke up with him before the accident. Laurel continues to spend more time with Basel and Audrey's best friend and coworker Claudia (Frankie Shaw), who grows suspicious due to Audrey's change of behavior and sudden lack of skills at work.

Eventually, Laurel and Basel fall in love and begin a relationship. When she finally feels that she is adapting to her new life, Laurel accidentally introduces Charles as her ex-boyfriend to her boss Edith (Sabrina Lloyd), not knowing that Charles is actually Edith's husband, and getting immediately fired as a result. Shortly after this, Basel proposes to Laurel saying that he has loved her since they first met, which to Laurel means he loves her as Audrey, not as herself. Unable to continue deceiving everyone, Laurel reveals the truth to Basel, but he is devastated by her deception and breaks up with her.

Laurel returns home to her father and confesses her impersonation to him. He is shocked, while at the same time being relieved that the daughter he felt closer to is still alive. There is another funeral, this time for Audrey. After talking to Claudia, and receiving encouragement from her father after showing him her original paintings, Laurel eventually comes to terms with her own insecurities about being the less worthy sister. She returns to the city as herself and looks for Basel, who's still upset but also still in love with her. In the end he forgives her; they share a kiss and start making plans for the future.

== Cast ==
- Zoe Kazan as Laurel/Audrey
  - Katherine Macanufo as Laurel/Audrey double
- Jake Johnson as Basel
- John Carroll Lynch as Frank, Laurel and Audrey's father
- Frankie Shaw as Claudia
- Shae D'lyn as May, Frank's fiancée
- Ron Livingston as Charles
- Sterling Beaumon as Hunter
- Robin Reiser as Hunter's Mom
- Luka Jones as Patrick
- Sabrina Lloyd as Edith
- Danny Pudi as Dr. Rao

== Production ==
On March 30, 2012, Zoe Kazan and Jake Johnson joined the cast of The Pretty One to play lead roles, Jenée LaMarque wrote the script and she made her directorial debut of her own 2011 black listed script. The filming started on June 1, 2012. Sterling Beaumon also joined the cast in the middle of June as Hunter, a womanizer who is sleeping with his former babysitter. Later on 22 June, Ron Livingston joined the cast to play Charles, Robin Schorr and Steven Berger produced the film.

=== Filming ===
The filming began in early June 2012 in Los Angeles.

== Reception ==
On the review aggregator website Rotten Tomatoes, 50% of 34 critics' reviews are positive.
