= The False Alarms =

Studio album by Fol Chen
- Released: March 19, 2013
- Genre: Electro-pop
- Length: 41:16
- Label: Asthmatic Kitty Records
- Producer: Samuel Bing, Julian Wass

Fol Chen chronology
Part II: The New December (2010)	The False Alarms (2013)

Professional ratings
Aggregate scores
Source	Rating
Metacritic	70/100
Review scores
Source	Rating
AllMusic	3.5/5 stars
The A.V. Club	B
Consequence of Sound	D
Exclaim!	8/10
Pitchfork Media	6.9/10
PopMatters	7/10 stars
The Skinny	3/5 stars
The Washington Post	favorable

The False Alarms is the third studio album by American electro-pop group Fol Chen. It was released by Asthmatic Kitty Records on March 19, 2013.

== Reception ==
At Metacritic, which assigns a weighted average score out of 100 to reviews from mainstream critics, The False Alarms received an average score of 70% based on 9 reviews, indicating "generally favorable reviews".

Zach Kelly of Pitchfork Media gave The False Alarms a 6.9 out of 10, saying: "Detours into coldwave and seance-y Scandi-pop still feel like an attempt to steer things in a new direction, but the songs fall prey to the same kind of directionless, inertia-deprived trappings that helped sink Fol Chen's previous records." Heather Phares of AllMusic said, "these songs are somewhat less enigmatic than before: the melodies are ever so slightly more direct, even though intricate arrangements and hooks that sneak up on the listener are still what make this band distinctive."

== Track listing ==
No.	Title	Length
1.	"The False Alarms"	3:14
2.	"I.O.U."	3:08
3.	"A Tourist Town"	3:34
4.	"Hemispheres"	3:43
5.	"The Fifth Season"	4:37
6.	"Boys in the Woods"	3:44
7.	"200 Words"	6:18
8.	"You Took the Train"	4:02
9.	"Doubles"	2:56
10.	"This Place Is on TV"	6:00
