= I Am the Man (album) =

Studio album by Simone White
- Released: June 4, 2007
- Recorded: Mark Nevers' studio in Nashville
- Genre: Folk music
- Length: 42:31
- Label: Honest Jon's
- Producer: Mark Nevers

Simone White chronology
Sincere Recording Co. Presents Simone White (2004)	I Am the Man (2007)	Yakiimo (2009)

I Am the Man is the second studio album by American folk singer-songwriter Simone White. It was released on June 4, 2007 on Honest Jon's Records. The album cover depicts White's mother lying next to a leopard on a bed.

== Recording and composition ==
It was recorded at the Nashville studio of producer Mark Nevers, who is known for his work with Lambchop. White has stated that the song "Great Imperialist State" is about “the disconnect between the things we consume and where they come from”, and that "Mary Jane" is about her grandmother.

== Critical reception ==
I Am the Man received mixed reviews from critics. Steve Hands awarded it only two stars out of five and concluded that it was "one slow spiral descent into soporific surrender." Edd Hurt and Robert Christgau both highlighted "Mary Jane" as among the best songs on the album.

Professional ratings
Review scores
Source	Rating
AllMusic	3.5/5 stars
MusicOMH	2/5 stars
No Depression	(favorable)
Robert Christgau	(choice cut)

== Track listing ==
All songs written by Simone White; except where noted.

1. "I Didn't Have a Summer Romance" (Carole King, Gerry Goffin)
2. "Worm Was Wood" (Frank Bango, Richy Vesecky)
3. "The Beep Beep Song"
4. "The American War"
5. "Roses Are Not Red" (Frank Bango, Richy Vesecky)
6. "Great Imperialist State"
7. "Mary Jane"
8. "You May Be in Darkness"
9. "Sweetest Love Song"
10. "We Used To Stand So Tall"
11. "Why Is Your Raincoat Always Crying?" (Frank Bango, Richy Vesecky)
12. "Only the Moon"
13. "I Am the Man"
