= Robert Hirschfeld =

American actor, author (1942–2009)

- Hirschfeld as Officer Leo Schnitz
- Born: June 8, 1942; New York, New York, U.S.
- Died: December 4, 2009 (aged 67); Dobbs Ferry, New York, U.S.
- Occupations: Actor, author
- Notable work: Hill Street Blues
- Spouse: Nancy White

Robert Hirschfeld (June 8, 1942 – December 4, 2009) was an American actor and author. He was best known for playing Officer Leo Schnitz on Hill Street Blues from 1981 to 1985. He also appeared in the films Cradle Will Rock (1999) and Escape from Alcatraz (1979).

Hirschfeld died in Dobbs Ferry, New York, at the age of 67.

== Bibliography ==
- Hirschfeld, Robert; White, Nancy (1997). The Kids' Science Book. Gareth Stevens. ISBN 978-0836819687.

== Filmography ==
Year	Title	Role	Notes
1973	Godmonster of Indian Flats	Sheriff Gordon	
1974	Dirty Mary Crazy Larry	Swapmeet Character	
1979	The Promise	Doctor Sidney Meisner	
1979	Escape from Alcatraz	Guard #14	
1979	More American Graffiti	Delivery Man	
1980	The Island	Cook	
1983	Off the Wall	Guard No. 1	
1981–1985	Hill Street Blues	Officer Leo Schnitz	Recurring role (Seasons 1–4); Main cast (Season 5)
1988	The Couch Trip	Night Watchman	
1999	Cradle Will Rock	Rockefeller Center - Sol	
