= William Heick =

American photographer and filmmaker (1916–2012)

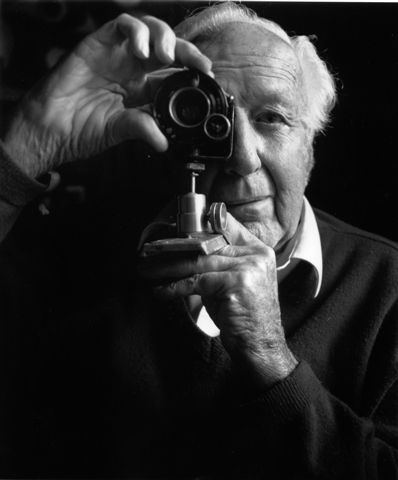
William Heick

William Heick (October 6, 1916 – September 13, 2012) was a San Francisco-based photographer and filmmaker. He is best known for his ethnographic photographs and documentary films of North American Indian cultures. Heick served as producer-director and chief cinematographer for the Anthropology Department of the University of California, Berkeley on their National Science Foundation supported American Indian Film Project. His photographs capture the life and culture of Native Americans from the Kwakiutl, Kashaya Pomo, Hupa, Navajo, Blackfoot and Sioux. He filmed a number of award winning films in this series along with the documentaries Pomo Shaman and Sucking Doctor, a Pomo doctoring ceremony considered by anthropologists to be one of the most complete and outstanding films of an aboriginal ceremony made to date.

== Art Photography ==
His fine art photography has been exhibited at the San Francisco Museum of Modern Art, the California Palace of the Legion of Honor, the DeYoung Museum, the Seattle Museum of Art, the Henry Gallery (University of Washington), the Phoebe A. Hearst Museum of Anthropology, and the University Art Gallery (Cal State at Chico) among others. His photographs have been selected for the permanent collections of the Museum of Modern Art, New York, the Smithsonian Institution, the High Museum of Art, Atlanta, the Santa Barbara Museum of Art, and the Monterey Peninsula Museum of Art.

In a published "Art Scene" review Monterey landscape artist and art critic Rick Deragon wrote: "The special qualities of W.R. Heicks's images come from the simple relationship between the photographer and subject. With no agenda other than to capture the decisive inspirational moment and to illustrate the human parade Mr. Heick's work transcends straight journalism and aspires to an art of nobility and compassion."

== Career ==
Heick's career in photography began as a naval intelligence photographer during World War Two in the Pacific. After the war he studied photography at California School of Fine Arts (now the San Francisco Art Institute) under such notable teachers as Ansel Adams and Minor White. He became lifelong friends with Imogen Cunningham and Dorothea Lange and regards these two photographers as the primary influences on his photographic work.

Heick filmed two documentaries about Pacific Northwest Indian tribes, Blunden Harbour (1951) and Dances of the Kwakiutl (1951).

Heick worked through most of the 1950s and 1960s as producer-director, assistant historian and cinematographer for the worldwide engineering firm of Bechtel Corporation. While with Bechtel he wrote and filmed documentaries of their major projects with special emphasis on ethnic and social consideration in remote areas of the Arctic, South America, Africa, Greenland, Europe, The Middle East, Australia, Indonesia and the islands of New Guinea and Bougainville. From 1956 to 1964 Heick was involved with C. Cameron Macauley in the American Indian Film Project, a project to document Native American cultures through film and sound recordings, working closely with Alfred Kroeber and Samuel Barrett.

Heick produced two documentaries for the Quakers. Beauty for Ashes documents the Quaker's project to rebuild 40 churches that had been burned by nightriders during Mississippi's racial strife in the turbulent 1960s. Voyage of the Phoenix documents the controversial voyage of the yacht Phoenix, which sailed through the American battle fleet during the Vietnam War to deliver medical supplies to North Vietnam when the bombing of that beleaguered country was at its peak.

In the late 1960s and early 1970s W.R. Heick served as cinematographer on three feature films, all for the director/artist Fredric Hobbs: Troika (1969, co-directed by Gordon Mueller), Alabama's Ghost (1973), and Godmonster of Indian Flats (1973).

During the mid-1970s, working as an independent producer with Gordon Mueller, W.R. Heick produced the Indonesian Dance Series. This series, funded with grants from Caltex Pacific Indonesia and Pertamina, documents fourteen traditional dance performances from the islands of Java, Bali, Sumatra and Kalimantan.

Heick's later films include The Other China, a four-part mini-series filmed on location in Taiwan in 1988 documenting the social and cultural fabric of Taiwan.

== Sources ==
- Boardman, Elizabeth Jelinek. The Phoenix Trip: Notes on a Quaker Mission to Haiphong, 1985. ISBN 0-914064-22-3
- Santino, Jack, reviewer. "Sucking Doctor," The Journal of American Folklore, Vol. 95, No. 378 (Oct. - Dec., 1982), pp. 501–504 doi:10.2307/540768.
- Ira Jacknis. "Visualizing Kwakwaka'wakw Tradition: The Films of William Heick, 1951-1963," BC STUDIES: The British Columbia Quarterly, A Special Double Issue, Number 125 & 126, 2000. ISBN 0-00-005294-9.
