= Troika (1969 film) =

1969 American art film

- 1969 promotional poster
- Directed by: Fredric Hobbs; Gordon Mueller
- Written by: Fredric Hobbs
- Produced by: Fredric Hobbs
- Starring: Fredric Hobbs; Richard Faun; Morgan Upton; Nate Thurmond; Gloria Rossi; Parra O'Siochain
- Cinematography: William Heick
- Edited by: Gordon Mueller
- Music by: Fredric Hobbs; Gordon Mueller
- Production company: Inca Films
- Distributed by: Emerson Film Enterprises
- Release date: November 21, 1969 (New York City)
- Running time: 89 minutes
- Country: United States
- Language: English

Troika is a 1969 American comedy art film written, directed, and produced by Charles Fredric Hobbs. It stars Hobbs, Richard Faun, Morgan Upton, Nate Thurmond, Gloria Rossi, and members of the San Francisco Art Institute. Its three parts are built around a fictional account of the director's attempt to gain financing for a film titled Troika.

Hobbs conceived the plot after working with the filmmakers Ron Bostwick and Robert Blaisdell on the short film Trojan Horse. Troika began as a "modern morality play"; the title comes from the Russian word for a set of three, reflecting the film's three segments. It was filmed in early to mid-1969 in locations in and around California. The score was a collaboration between Hobbs and the editor-co-director Gordon Mueller.

Troika was previewed on October 12, 1969, and officially premiered on November 8. The few reviews it received were mixed to positive, yet it became foundational for Hobbs' career and led to his three other films, before he retired in the late 1970s. The film is largely unavailable to the general public; during his lifetime Hobbs blocked Troika releases on home video as he was unhappy with the final print. In 2022, a copy restored by Glasgow's Matchbox Cine with the permission of Hobbs' family was screened at the Weird Weekend Cult Film Festival.

== Plot ==
Troika consists of an introductory story and three 'titled' parts, each told in differing narrative styles. The film opens with an artist—Fredric Hobbs portraying a fictional version of himself—as he paints on a blank canvas. The scene then transitions to a series of encounters between Hobbs and the Hollywood producer Gordon Goodloins (Richard Faun) as the former attempts to convince him to invest in a proposed art film titled Troika. Goodloins relents and agrees to hear out Hobbs' proposal. Later, the two men meet and discuss the cinematic connections between art and life concerning his vision for the film. Goodloins is unimpressed by the idea and rebuffs him, suggesting that there is no consumer demand for art films. The sequence ends with Goodloins driving off in a limousine as Hobbs angrily chases behind him, shouting, "Up yours, Mr. Goodloins!"

The individual sections are not titled in the credits; Hobbs named them in an interview "The Chef", "Alma Mater", and "The Blue People".

=== The Chef ===
In this segment, a chef wearing ritualistic face paint begins making an alchemical and culinary brew in a large pot, into which he throws items such as medals and emblems. Nearby, a homunculus made of cloth lies inert; the chef uses pieces of it as ingredients for the concoction. Unsatisfied with the results, the chef introduces a woman, played by Gloria Rossi, covered in painted symbols. They dance the tango, then he throws her into the pot. Picking up a rose she had dropped, the chef gazes at it before tossing it too into the pot.

=== Alma Mater ===
Presented in documentary style, the second segment depicts a student demonstration in the late 1960s. It opens during a sit-in on a college campus as mounted police gather outside. In the classroom, students covered in white face paint rest on toilet seats and chaise longues while college professors lecture them on different topics. Six professors complete their lectures, then the frustrated students boo a dunce-capped teacher out of the classroom.

=== The Blue People ===
The final segment opens with a train arriving at a grassy landscape. A tall insectoid named Rax (Morgan Upton) exits and travels to a nearby coastal hill. He is later attacked by a feral human (Parra O'Siochain), who leaves him for dead. Rax staggers onto a beach where he collapses and convulses in pain as an orange colored woman (Rossi) emerges from the ocean, pushing a large sculpture. Seeing Rax, the woman turns towards him, caressing his wounds and eventually masturbating in front of him. The shot cuts to a seemingly rejuvenated Rax entering an icy cave where he meets a seven-foot-tall shaman known as the Attenuated Man (Nate Thurmond). Addressing Rax in distorted Arabic, he induces a vision of a sculpture of three corpse-like beings emerging from the cave's ceiling. Rax, alongside the Attenuated Man, then join a procession of blue people who embrace him as their "savior". The procession escorts Rax on a strange vehicle, marching across an otherworldly plain and through a ghost town before they arrive at a railway terminal. There, Rax bids the group goodbye as he boards the train, and the sequence ends with a shot of Rax as he merges with the sculpture of the three beings.

The film then cuts back to Hobbs, who has completed the painting. It is unveiled as a grotesque figure of a woman from whose extended arm hangs many faces and shapes. Satisfied with the painting, Hobbs exits the frame, and the film ends. (Note: Plot synopsis gathered from Stephen Thrower's book Nightmare USA: The Untold Story of the Exploitation Independents.)

== Production ==
=== Development ===
Hobbs' sculpture The Trojan Horse (1964) as it appears in the film

Hobbs graduated from Cornell University in 1953 with a Bachelor of Arts degree, and hoped for a career in the visual arts. In the late 1950s and early 1960s, he produced paintings and sculptures acclaimed for their unique style, which explored environmentalist and spiritualist themes. In 1967, Hobbs collaborated with the filmmakers Ron Bostwick and Robert Blaisdell on a 25-minute (Note: Some sources list the runtime as 30 minutes, but a 1968 publication from the Library of Congress gives the runtime as twenty-five minutes.) documentary on his "parade sculpture" Trojan Horse, a metal sculpture bolted over a Chrysler chassis cab. Hobbs financed the project in conjunction with the independent production company Inca Films. During the collaboration, he became fascinated with film as an art form and began to develop the concept for Troika, which he described as a "modern miracle play – but not underground".

Troika was developed during the late 1960s arthouse cinematic movement, when visual style often took precedence over linear narration. Contemporary writers categorized the film as a comedy or art film. It incorporates several different narratives and genres within each segment. Hobbs crafted Troika as a series of increasingly bizarre segments, the final segment being his favorite. The film expands upon his earlier works, exploring environmental and spiritual themes through a series of images. Religious motifs incorporated into the film were taken from several cultural backgrounds. The dialogue of the Attenuated Man, according to Hobbs, was taken from a portion of the Quran discussing the concept of Universal Brotherhood and modified later in post-production. The procession sequence, where Rax is paraded through the ghost town, features the Trojan Horse sculpture. In an interview with Stephen Thrower, Hobbs stated that the "Chef" segment was developed as anti-war statement. Historical events were also used as inspiration for some of the film's sequences. For the "Alma Mater" segment, shot in the narrative style of an expressionist documentary film, Hobbs reportedly took his inspiration from the Kent State riots, in 1967 and April 1969.

=== Casting ===
The cast was mainly composed of unknown actors, although some had backgrounds in theatre. Hobbs plays a fictionalized version of himself and the chef character. The San Francisco-based basketball player Nate Thurmond appears as the mystical "Attenuated Man" in the final segment; one writer described the character as a Christ-like figure.

Morgan Upton, later known for his roles in The Candidate (1972) and Peggy Sue Got Married (1986), appears as Rax, the bug-man. Members of the San Francisco Art Institute were hired for several roles, including the blue and purple people and the students in the "Alma Mater" scene. Some of the characters in the marching sequence were student activists from the UC Berkeley School of Law.

=== Locations ===
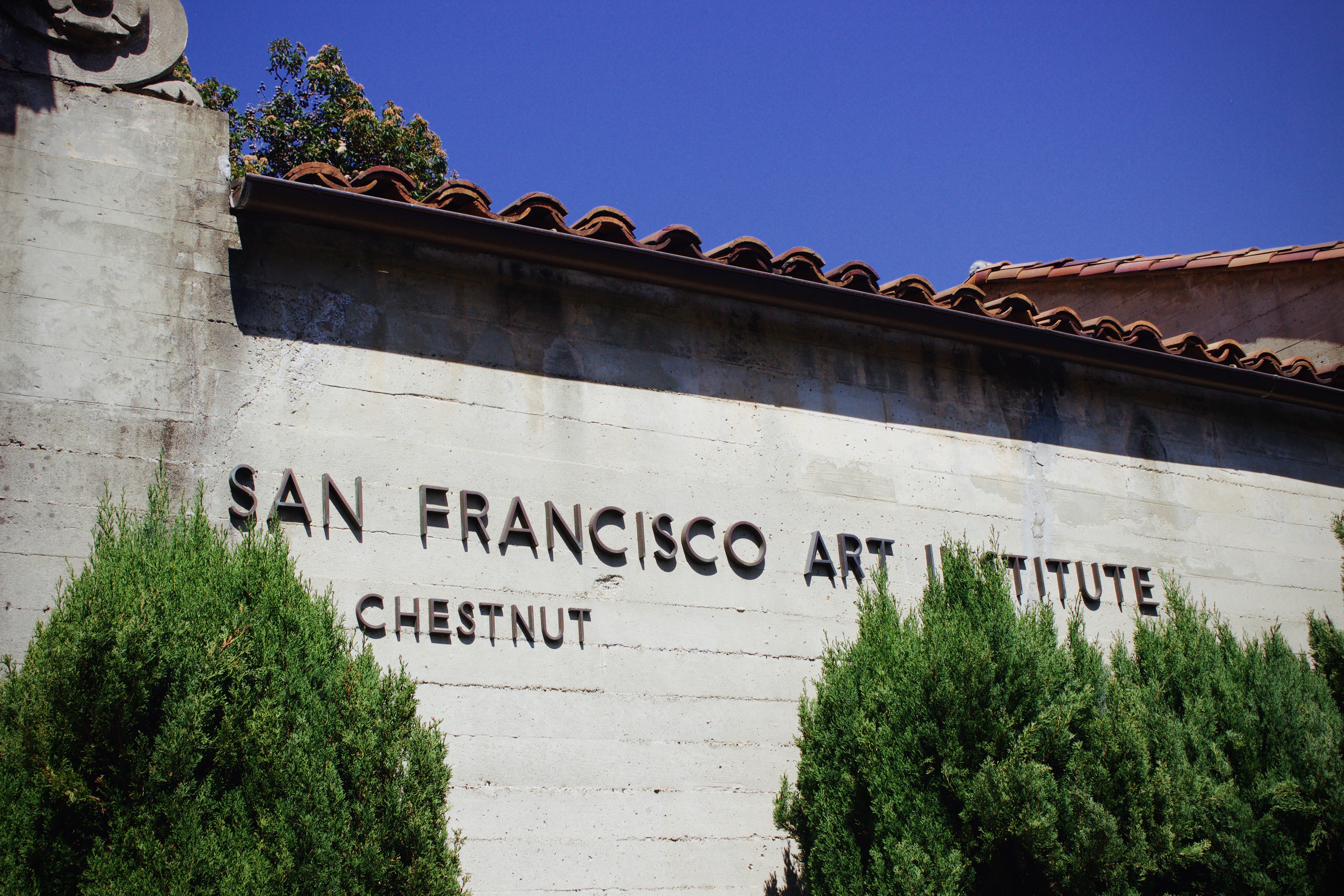
Facilities at the San Francisco Art Institute were used as one of the film's shooting locations.

Principal photography began in 1969. The visual artist Gordon Mueller was hired as the editor, and directed the scenes where Hobbs was on camera. Richard Faun, who portrays Gordon Goodloins in the film was also credited as co-director. The photographer and filmmaker William Heick was brought in as cinematographer; he was a close friend of Hobbs and had worked with the filmmakers Sidney Peterson and Robert Gardner between 1948 and 1953.

The "Chef" sequence was shot inside a local brewery where the crew used the vat as the chef's alchemy pot. The "Alma Mater" sequence was shot at the San Francisco Art Institute, with additional filming in Hillsborough, California. The segment's documentary footage was shot during the 1960s Berkeley protests. The ghost town in the final "Blue People" sequence was filmed in Collinsville, California, and the "otherworldly" landscape was shot in the outskirts of a town where a brush fire had recently occurred. Hobbs drilled the student activists portraying the characters in the marching sequence to march in step. Hobbs intended to include a sequence involving Thurmond's character as he runs alongside the skyline. The scene was filmed at Fort Cronkhite, but was abandoned when the army fired Nike Hercules missiles during an exercise, ruining the shot.

Hobbs designed the costumes and many of the background paintings and sculptures. Some of these were artworks he had made earlier, such as the Trojan Horse in the processional scene. He and Meuller co-produced the soundtrack, generating sounds that Thrower described as echoing the avant-garde composer La Monte Young.

== Release ==
Troika was first screened on October 12, 1969, and had its official premiere on November 21 in New York. The associated paintings and sculptures were exhibited at the John Bolles Gallery in San Francisco between November 1969 and January 1970. It was screened at the Granada Theater in Wilmington, California on November 28, receiving doubling-billing alongside John Perry's short film Dandelion (1969). During its release, some theaters ran advertisements with the caption "Means Three", a translation of the Russian name the title was based on. It was later screened in New York through December 14. Troika aired on UK and Canadian television between May and December 1979.

In later years, Hobbs repeatedly blocked its release on home video as he was dissatisfied with the quality of the print and was holding out to finish an edit ultimately never completed. The only known print is stored at the Berkeley Art Museum and Pacific Film Archives and includes additional materials. In October 2022 Matchbox Cine in Glasgow, with the permission of Hobbs' estate, acquired a copy and commissioned restoration efforts. The film was screened for the first time in over fifty years at the Weird Weekend Cult Film Festival on October 28, 2022.

== Reception and legacy ==
Contemporary and retrospective reviews of Troika have been largely positive, critics focusing on its visual style and narrative. In 1969, Howard Thompson of The New York Times praised its unconventional plot, describing it as a "cluttered and disconnected collage of art objects, paintings, live-action fantasy and symbolism". Its surreal and psychedelic visuals were also praised by video retail company Blockbuster Video in their annual movie guide, describing it as a "wildly offbeat look at the movie business". The TV Guide echoed this sentiment and also noted that the film would only appeal to viewers who did not mind its unconventional narrative.

The film was generally well-received, especially for its cinematography, but Cue magazine described it as "grotesque", dismissing its visual style as self-indulgent and "devoid of talent". Kevin Thomas of the Los Angeles Times wrote that the narrative was original but incoherent, and the comedic elements were too heavy-handed to be funny. He called it "obscure and boring". In a 1969 review, Wanda Hale of the Daily News wrote that the film had artistic merit, but was compromised by "amateurish" production.

Hobbs developed three more films after Troika. The first, Roseland: A Fable (1970), was a surrealist satire on the sexual revolution and Hobbs' first feature marketed towards a mainstream audience. He wrote and directed his last two films in 1973, but they were critical and commercial failures and lead to his retirement from filmmaking.

== Works cited ==
=== Books ===
- Library of Congress Catalog: Motion Pictures and Filmstrips. Vol. 3. Library of Congress. 1968.
- Aitken, Ian (January 4, 2013). The Concise Routledge Encyclopedia of the Documentary Film (reprint ed.). Routledge. ISBN 978-1-1365-1206-3.
- Albright, Thomas (August 11, 1985). Art in the San Francisco Bay Area, 1945-1980: An Illustrated History. University of California Press. ISBN 978-0-5200-5193-5.
- Aros, Andrew (January 1, 1977). An Actor Guide to the Talkies, 1965 Through 1974. Scarecrow Press. ISBN 978-0-8108-1052-5.
- Castell, Ron, ed. (August 1, 1995). Blockbuster Video Guide to Movies and Videos, 1996. Dell Publishing. ISBN 978-0-4402-2114-2.
- Hinckle, Warren; Hobbs, Fredric (January 1, 1978). The Richest Place on Earth: The Story of Virginia City, and the Heyday of the Comstock Lode. Houghton Mifflin Harcourt. ISBN 978-0-3952-5348-9.
- Means, Howard (April 12, 2016). 67 Shots: Kent State and the End of American Innocence. Hachette Books. ISBN 978-0-3068-2379-4.
- Nash, Jay; Ross, Stanley (January 1, 1985). The Motion Picture Guide. Cinebooks. ISBN 978-0-9339-9700-4.
- Lee, Walt (January 1, 1972). Reference Guide to Fantastic Films: Science Fiction, Fantasy, & Horror. Vol. 3. Chelsea-Lee Books. ISBN 978-0-9139-7403-2.
- Thrower, Stephen (July 23, 2007). Nightmare USA: The Untold Story of the Exploitation Independents. FAB Press. ISBN 978-1-9032-5446-2.
- Welsh, James; Phillips, Gene; Hill, Rodney (August 27, 2010). The Francis Ford Coppola Encyclopedia. Scarecrow Press. ISBN 978-0-8108-7651-4.
- Weldon, Michael (August 15, 1996). The Psychotronic Video Guide To Film. St. Martin's Press. ISBN 978-0-3121-3149-4.

=== Periodicals ===
- "Troika". Los Angeles Free Press. Vol. 6, no. 280. November 28, 1969. p. 6. JSTOR 28039862.
- "'Troika' on Screen at Granada Theater". The Los Angeles Times. November 28, 1969. p. 26 – via Newspapers.com.
- "Troika (Means Three)". Los Angeles Evening Citizen. November 29, 1969. p. 8 – via Newspapers.com (subscription required).
- "Troika (1969)". Red Deer Advocate. May 31, 1979. p. 50 – via Newspapers.com (subscription required).
- "Troika (1969)". Birmingham Post. September 8, 1979. p. 1 – via Newspapers.com (subscription required).
- "Troika (1969)". Edmonton Journal. December 28, 1979. p. 90 – via Newspapers.com (subscription required).
- Bladen, Barbra (January 29, 1971). "The Marquee". The Times. p. 13 – via Newspapers.com (subscription required).
- Bordwell, David (Fall 1979). "The Art Cinema as a Mode of Film Practice". Film Criticism. 4 (1). Allegheny College: 56–64. JSTOR 44018650.
- Frankenstein, Alfred (September 19, 1965). "The Russian Little Guy Comes Through". The San Francisco Examiner. p. 26 – via Newspapers.com (subscription required).
- French, Palmer (February 1968). "Reviews: San Francisco". Artforum. Vol. 6, no. 6. p. 59.
- French, Palmer (January 1970). "Reviews: San Francisco". Artforum. Vol. 8, no. 5. p. 78.
- Gilbert, Ruth, ed. (December 15, 1969). "Movies Around Town". The New Yorker. Vol. 2, no. 50. p. 12.
- Glankoff, Mort (1969). "Untitled". Cue. Vol. 38. North American Publishing Company.
- Hale, Wanda (November 26, 1969). "Arty 'Troika' Has Limited Appeal". Daily News. p. 56 – via Newspapers.com (subscription required).
- Lewis, Dave (October 12, 1969). "Buckeyes Don't Rate as Playboys". Press-Telegram. p. 88 – via Newspapers.com (subscription required).
- Lynch, Jack (January 31, 1971). "The Essence of Filmmaker Hobbs Is an Elusive Business". The San Francisco Examiner. pp. 8–9 – via Newspapers.com (subscription required).
- Morch, Albert (November 7, 1969). "Games of Skill Aid Lamplighters". The San Francisco Examiner. p. 51 – via Newspapers.com (subscription required).
- Olmsted, Robert (June 1962). "Fredric Hobbs". Artforum. Vol. 1, no. 1. pp. 36–37.
- Polley, E.M. (March 1963). "Fredric Hobbs, Edward Quill Gallery". Artforum. Vol. 1, no. 9. pp. 16–17.
- Thomas, Kevin (November 27, 1969). "Fredric Hobbs Features Trilogy in His 'Troika'". The Los Angeles Times. p. 106 – via Newspapers.com (subscription required).
- Thomas, Kevin (December 7, 1969). "Troika". The Los Angeles Times. p. 28 – via Newspapers.com (subscription required).
- Thompson, Howard (November 26, 1969). "Screen: 'Troika' Arrives: Collage of Art Objects Marks Hobbs Film". New York Times – via Newspapers.com (subscription required).
