= For Madmen Only: The Stories of Del Close =

2020 American documentary about Del Close

- Directed by: Heather Ross
- Written by: Heather Ross; Adam Samuel Goldman
- Produced by: Heather Ross; Adam Samuel Goldman
- Edited by: George Mandl; Tova Goodman; Sean Jarrett
- Music by: Jacques Brautbar
- Production company: Sincerely Films
- Distributed by: Hulu
- Release dates: October 14, 2020 (CIFF); July 27, 2021 (United States)
- Running time: 85 minutes
- Country: United States
- Language: English

For Madmen Only: The Stories of Del Close is a 2020 comedy-documentary hybrid film about comedian Del Close (1934–1999), who coached many of the best-known comedians and comic actors of the late twentieth century. Its stories are drawn in part from Wasteland, an autobiographical horror comic co-written by Close and John Ostrander and published by DC Comics (1987–89). Directed by Heather Ross, the film stars James Urbaniak (as Close), Patton Oswalt, Bob Odenkirk, Jason Sudeikis, Matt Walsh, Josh Fadem, and Lauren Lapkus. It premiered digitally at SXSW in 2020.

== Cast ==
- James Urbaniak as Del Close
- Matt Walsh as Mike Gold
- Josh Fadem as John Ostrander
- Patton Oswalt as Lash LaRue
- Michaela Watkins as The Narrator
- Paul Scheer as The Rat
- Lennon Parham as Arabella
- Lauren Lapkus as Arabella's Assistant
- Diona Reasonover as Annie the Summoner

=== Notable interviewees ===
- Andrew Alexander
- Ike Barinholtz
- Adam McKay
- Tim Meadows
- Bob Odenkirk
- Jason Sudeikis
- Dave Thomas
- George Wendt

== Reception ==
The New York Times recommended the film in its "What to Watch" section, writing "Heather Ross's rowdy, energetic documentary assembles the expected treasure trove of archival clips and testimonials from famous faces, while playfully re-enacting [Close's] wilder moments and odder inclinations." The Hollywood Reporter called it "a funny and poignant look at a man to whom comedy nerds owe an incalculable debt."

On the review aggregator site Rotten Tomatoes, the film has a 92% approval rating among critics.
