= Fredric Hobbs =

American artist and filmmaker (1931–2018)

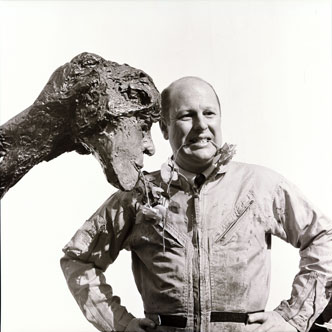
- Fred Hobbs 1970 Roseland and Sun Chariot
- Born: December 30, 1931; Philadelphia, Pennsylvania, US
- Died: April 25, 2018 (aged 86); Monterey County, California, US
- Occupations: Filmmaker, Painter, Sculptor

Fredric Hobbs (December 30, 1931 - April 25, 2018) was an American artist and filmmaker. He is known for pioneering an artistic style he termed ART ECO. His work has been showcased at museums and galleries internationally, and his works are part of the permanent collections of the Museum of Modern Art (New York), the Metropolitan Museum of Art, the San Francisco Museum of Modern Art, and the Fine Arts Museum of San Francisco.

== Biography ==
Fredric Hobbs (full name Charles Fredric Hobbs) was born in Philadelphia on December 30, 1931. He attended the Menlo School in Menlo Park, California and in 1953 earned B.A. in History from Cornell University. After service as a US Air Force Officer in Korea, Hobbs maintained a studio in Madrid where he attended the Real Academia de Bellas Artes de San Fernando. Later in life, his studios were located in San Francisco and Carmel, California.

Since the 1950s, the artist's work has concerned spiritual and environmental consciousness. In 1963, Hobbs created a radical new automobile art called "Parade Sculpture". This concept had its origin in ancient religious processions and self-propelled tableaux. During the 60s, three parade pieces ("Sun Chariot", "Three Thieves", "Trojan Horse") removed art from its museum environment, thereby confronting a mass audience under circumstances of everyday life. Driveable sculpture was exhibited in New York, California and as part of the famous national traveling show entitled "The Highway".

In the early 1970s, Fredric Hobbs pioneered another art form known as ART ECO. ART ECO combines environmental technology, fine art, solar/nomadic architecture, and interactive communications with an ecologically balanced lifestyle.

Hobbs wrote, directed, and produced four films that received distribution: Troika (1969), Roseland (1971), Alabama's Ghost (1973) and Godmonster of Indian Flats (1973). Copies of these films and other videorecordings Hobbs' directed or produced are held by the Berkeley Art Museum and Pacific Film Archive, and the American Genre Film Archive. These films were in part experimental platforms for Hobbs' other work, for example, Troika is a film about a fictionalized Hobbs attempting to fund and make a film titled Troika, and the titular "godmonster" of Godmonster of Indian Flats was depicted using a sculpture made by Hobbs himself.

In 1978, with Warren Hinckle, Hobbs wrote and illustrated The Richest Place on Earth, a history of Nevada's Comstock Lode in the 1860s and '70s, published by Houghton Mifflin Company, Boston. Once an owner of the Silver Dollar Hotel in Virginia City, Nevada, Hobbs had a long and multifaceted relationship with Virginia City and environs. He also wrote and directed a film of the same title the same year, produced by the Virginia city Restoration Corporation.

Hobbs' 1986 acrylic drawing "South Coast Series: Two Currents" is a part of the Fine Arts Museums of San Francisco's permanent collection. It was last exhibited there in 1987.

Hobbs died on April 25, 2018, in Monterey County, California.

== Filmography ==
- Trojan Horse (1969) (writer and director)
- Troika (1969) (writer, director, producer)
- Roseland: A Fable (1970) (writer, director, producer)
- Alabama's Ghost (1972) (writer, director, producer)
- Godmonster of Indian Flats (1973) (writer, director, producer)
- The Richest Place on Earth (1978) (writer and director)
- FASTFUTURE I (1992) and 2 (2001) (director), for KCRB TV

== Bibliography ==
- The Richest Place on Earth: the Story of Virginia City, and the Heyday of the Comstock Lode (1978), with Warren Hinckle, Boston: Houghton Mifflin
- Eat Your House: ART ECO Guide to Self-sufficiency (1980), Virginia City, NV: Virginia City Restoration Corp.
- The Spirit of the Monterey Coast (1990), Palo Alto, CA: Tioga Publishing Company
