= Frank Bango =

- Origin: New York, United States
- Genres: Power pop, pop rock, singer-songwriter
- Occupations: Musician, vocalist
- Instruments: Vocals, guitar
- Years active: 1994–present
- Label: Sincere Recordings
- Website: sincererecording.com

Frank Bango is a New York–based singer-songwriter who has released six albums on his own Sincere Recordings imprint since 1994. He co-writes his songs with longtime collaborator Richy Vesecky. His music has been described as accessible, classic-sounding pop influenced by the Brill Building songwriting tradition.

== Musical style and influences ==
Bango and Vesecky cite the golden age of the Brill Building as their primary influence. Critics have frequently compared Bango's songwriting to Elvis Costello, Ray Davies, and Andy Partridge. USA Today wrote that Bango "has melody and wordplay worthy of Elvis Costello — and a romantic whimsy Costello couldn't touch." Bango has acknowledged the comparisons, stating: "I can see why people spot the influence but I think there are some others that, to me, seem just as obvious. But if people hear Costello, that's A-OK with me." He also cites Brian Wilson, Charlie Rich, and Jonathan Richman as influences.

Liner notes for The Truth Fox describe his style as "about as anglo as a mature New York songwriter can get, short of pure affectation," with "clever chord progressions flow[ing] downstream from the Beatles and the Zombies" and "melodies generally free of blues, soul, and folk devices and full of baroque pop implication."

== Career ==
=== Early career and recordings (1994–2008) ===
Bango released his debut album I Set Myself on Fire Today in 1994 as a fully independent effort on his own Sincere Recordings label. Beginning with Fugitive Girls (1999), he began working with producer and engineer David Domanich, co-owner of Waterfront Studios in Hoboken, New Jersey, where Lenny Kravitz's Let Love Rule and Mama Said were recorded. Domanich mixed Fugitive Girls and went on to record, mix, and produce The Unstudied Sea (2003).

In 1999, Bango contributed a cover of "Goodbye Holly" to Shadows Breaking Over Our Heads: A Tribute to The Left Banke, alongside artists including Jason Falkner and Ken Stringfellow.

=== The Sweet Songs of Decay and cancer diagnosis (2007–2008) ===
Bango's fourth album, The Sweet Songs of Decay, was released in 2008. It was recorded at Jack McKeever's Maid's Room Studio in New York and in Hoboken, New Jersey, with contributions from Sean Eden (Luna), Steve Calhoun (Enon), Jane Scarpantoni, Joan Wasser, and Graham Maby (Joe Jackson). The record was mixed by Pete Min and Ed Stasium (Talking Heads, Ramones, The Smithereens).

The day after the album's final mastering, Bango was diagnosed with Hodgkin lymphoma.

The album received widespread critical praise. INK 19 called it "one of the best albums of this decade in any genre...flat-out brilliant," while Delusions of Adequacy named it "a front-runner on the short list for best album of 2008." Obscure Sound wrote that "praise for Bango for producing 'some of the best and most original pop music that almost no one has ever heard' initially appeared as a hyperbole to me, but The Sweet Songs of Decay proves to make the statement startlingly accurate."

=== Touchy/Feely (2013) ===
Bango's fifth album, Touchy/Feely, was released in 2013. It was recorded and produced by Bryce Goggin (Pavement, The Lemonheads, Joan as Police Woman, Antony and the Johnsons). The backing band included Steve Goulding on drums (Graham Parker and the Rumour, The Cure, Elvis Costello), Jeremy Chatzky on bass (Ronnie Spector, Steve Earle), and Scott Metzger on guitar.

=== The Truth Fox (2023) ===
Bango's sixth album, The Truth Fox, was released in April 2023. It was produced by Bango and Danny Blume at Hidden Quarry Studios, mixed by Bryce Goggin at Trout Recorders in New York, and mastered by Scott Anthony at Storybook Sound in New Jersey. The album features Jerry Marotta and Parker Kindred on drums, and Tyler Wood on keyboards.

Critic John Burdick described the album as "a sequence of mid-life reckonings and recognitions" in which "a man confronts the isolation, loss, and insecurity of age," calling it "an acutely personal passage through karma and regret...synced to a larger sense of culture-wide instability."

=== Songwriting and sync placements ===
Singer-songwriter Simone White recorded her debut album with Bango and released it in 2003 on his Sincere Recording Company label. White went on to sign with Honest Jon's, the British label co-founded by Damon Albarn (Blur, Gorillaz), and released three albums on the imprint: I Am the Man (2007), Yakiimo (2009), and Silver Silver (2012). Her recordings included covers of several Bango and Vesecky songs, among them "Roses Are Not Red," "Wrong About You," "Worm Was Wood," and "Bunny in a Bunnysuit."

White's version of "Bunny in a Bunnysuit," from her album Yakiimo, was used in an international advertising campaign for the Omega Ladymatic watch starring Nicole Kidman. The song also appeared in the closing credits of the 2013 Sony Pictures film The Pretty One, starring Zoe Kazan, Jake Johnson, and Ron Livingston.

Bango and Vesecky's songs have also been placed in television and independent film, including the Fox series John Doe and the 2014 film The Red Knot, directed by Scott Cohen and starring Olivia Thirlby and Vincent Kartheiser.

Throughout his recording career, Bango has maintained close ties to New York's live music world, working as a bartender and eventually general manager at the Bowery Ballroom in Manhattan from 1997 to 2012, and in 2024 serving as general manager of the Bearsville Theater in Woodstock, New York, when Peter Shapiro's Dayglo Presents took over operations of the historic 500-capacity venue. Bango stepped down from the Bearsville role in January 2026.

== Discography ==
=== Albums ===
- I Set Myself on Fire Today (1994, Sincere Recordings)
- Fugitive Girls (1999, Sincere Recordings)
- The Unstudied Sea (2003, Sincere Recordings)
- The Sweet Songs of Decay (2008, Sincere Recordings)
- Touchy/Feely (2013, Sincere Recordings)
- The Truth Fox (2023, Sincere Recordings)

=== Singles ===
- "Christmas in Bed With My Baby" (2015)
- "When a Man Is Not a Man" (2018)
- "Holiday Episode" / "You Made Christmas" (2023)

=== Compilation appearances ===
- "Goodbye Holly" on Shadows Breaking Over Our Heads: A Tribute to The Left Banke (1999, Apollo Records)
- "First Broken Heart in Space" (featured artist) on Princess Telephone (2023)
