= Granada Theater (Wilmington, California) =

Theater in Los Angeles

Coordinates: 33.77804°N 118.26207°W

- Interactive map of Granada Theater
- Location: 632 N. Avalon Blvd., Wilmington, Los Angeles
- Capacity: 1,000
- Type: Entertainment venue

Construction
- Opened: 1926

Granada Theater is a theater in Wilmington, Los Angeles, United States. C.L. Post of the Post Cereal family built the Granada Theatre in 1926 as part of the West Coast Theatres chain. One year later, Fox Theatres purchased West Coast and changed the name to the Fox Granada.

The architect was W.J. MacCormack.

In 2016, the theater was the filming location for the video to the song "Ophelia" by The Lumineers.

The Los Angeles City Council designated the theater as a historic cultural monument in 2021.

The theatre is closed, but the Wilmington Granada Friends is fundraising to reopen the theatre as a performing arts center and independent cinema.
