= Heather Ross =

American film director

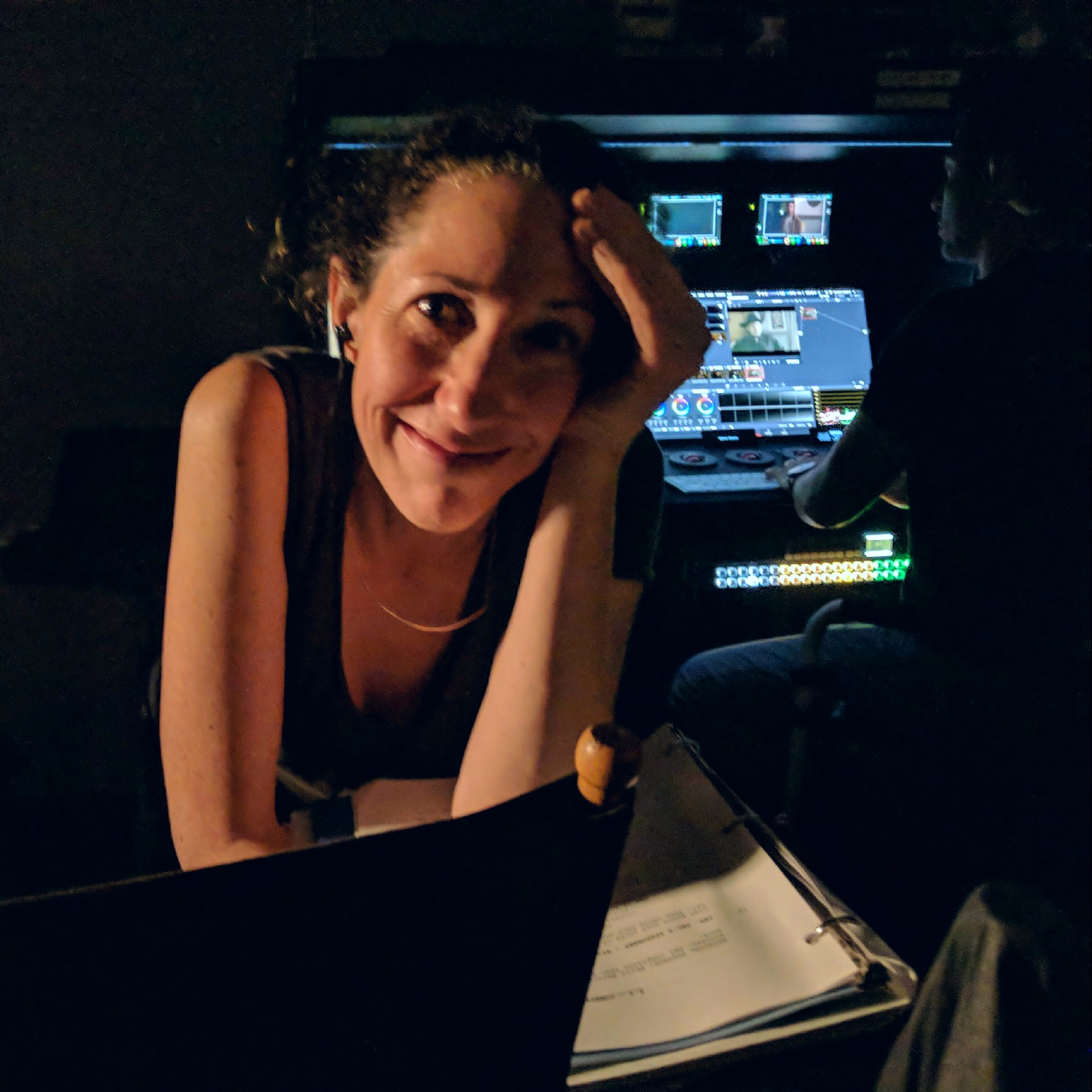
- Ross, 2018
- Occupations: Film and television director, producer
- Notable work: Girls on the Wall; Baby Mama High; Who Do You Think You Are?

Heather Ross is an American film director best known for her 2009 film Girls on the Wall, for which she won an Emmy Award. Ross won a prime time Emmy Award for her work as producer of the Bryan Cranston episode of the genealogy series Who Do You Think You Are. She is also known for directing the 2014 documentary short Baby Mama High as part of the Corporation for Public Broadcasting's American Graduate series. The film caused a stir in 2017, when Rep. Andy Harris (R-Md.) objected to the film's content during a House subcommittee hearing on CPB funding. Harris admitted that he had not actually viewed the film.

Ross is the director of several shorts in the It Gets Better series of LGBTQ advocacy films, including one featuring Jane Lynch. She also directed and co-wrote For Madmen Only, a biographical film about actor and comedy teacher Del Close.
