= Fol Chen =

American electronic band

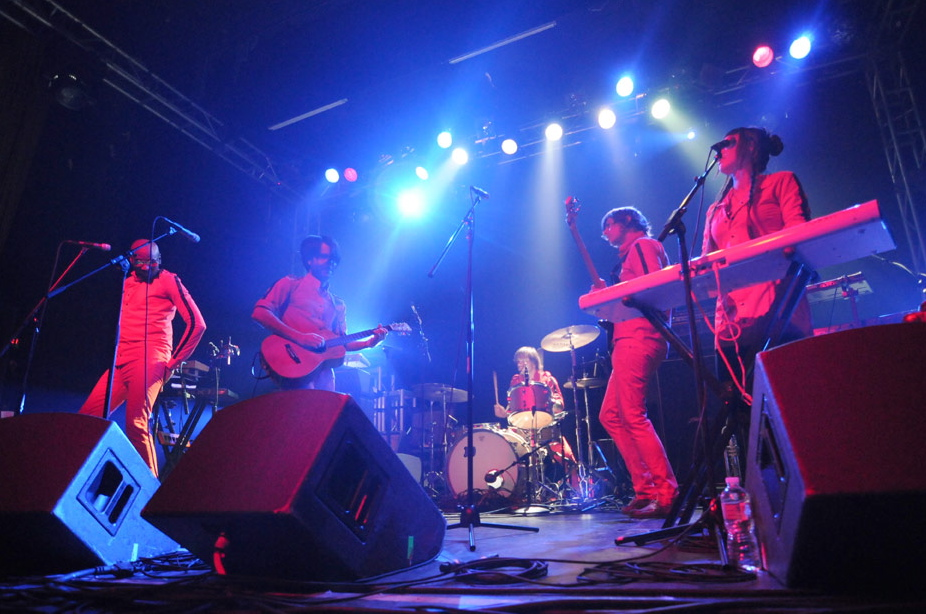
- Fol Chen at the Granada Theater in 2010.

Background information
- Origin: Los Angeles, California, United States
- Genres: Electronic, experimental
- Years active: 2009-present
- Label: Asthmatic Kitty Records
- Members: Adam Samuel Goldman (credited as Samuel Bing); The Booksman; Garrett Henritz; Sinosa Loa; Patrik-Ian Polk
- Website: cargocollective.com/folchen

Fol Chen is an American electronic band from Los Angeles, California, formed in 2009. The band is signed to Asthmatic Kitty Records and has released three full-length albums.

== Part I: John Shade, Your Fortune's Made ==
The band "maintained utmost secrecy from the start", working under aliases and disguising their faces during recorded shows, including KCRW radio's Morning Becomes Eclectic program and the 2009 South by Southwest festival.

The cover art for their first album, Part I: John Shade, Your Fortune's Made, release in 2009, features silhouettes, and music videos replace band members with actors and animation, such as the video of the song "No Wedding Cake" where band members appear as animals.

== Part II: The New December ==
In 2010, the band released Part II: The New December, described by the Los Angeles Times as "screwball pastiche pop [that] sounds like an algebra problem but feels like a come-on." Sinosa Loa joined the group at this time as keyboardist and vocalist, although the band favored group vocals and shared lead duties among most members. They toured throughout the U.S., Canada and Europe with other American bands, including Liars, !!!, and The Apples in Stereo.

== The False Alarms (2013) ==
The band's third album was released March 19, 2013, on the Asthmatic Kitty label. The music is in a style the band calls "Opera-House", which they describe as "beat-driven electronica with grand, operatic gestures and lyrically-dense storytelling." In a departure from their previous use of multiple lead singers, Loa performs all ten tracks.

== Other projects ==
During a month-long residency at The Echo nightclub in Los Angeles, the band featured different shows each night – one show invited guest singers found via Craigslist to perform with the band as a sort of live karaoke; another night saw metal band Viscera playing exclusively Fol Chen covers.

In November 2010, Goldman and Loa traveled to Saint Petersburg, Russia, to perform two long-form, constructivist-inspired reworkings of the two studio albums, followed by a workshop and recording session where they invited local musicians (and curious non-musicians) to join them in building a new Fol Chen song.

On July 28, 2011, Goldman and Loa held a workshop at the Walker Art Center in Minneapolis to introduce the Fol Chen Verbal Algorithm Composer-Free Song Generator, produced with the Los Angeles–based arts organization Machine Project. The project allowed museum visitors to record their experience with a piece of art and have it converted into a song that they could take home.

The band collaborated with Monome, a computer-manufacturing company, in late 2011 to make the Tetrafol, a motion-sensitive pyramidal sound device. The Tetrafol came pre-loaded with Fol Chen samples but allowed users to apply their own sounds. The band released two singles made with the device and sold a limited run of 100 units.

== Members ==
- Adam Samuel Goldman (credited as Samuel Bing)
- The Booksman
- Garrett Henritz
- Sinosa Loa
- Patrik-Ian Polk

== Discography ==
=== Albums ===
- Part I: John Shade, Your Fortune's Made (2009)
- Part II: The New December (2010)
- The False Alarms (2013)

=== Covers, remixes and collaborations ===
- The Longer U Wait remix digital release (Asthmatic Kitty, 2009)
- 2009: "The Beautiful Ones" cover on the Prince tribute album Purplish Rain
- 2009: "In the Flesh" cover on the Pink Floyd tribute album The Wall Re-Built
- 2011: "I Walked" (Sufjan Stevens cover)
- 2012: "Implants and Yankee Candles" with Kitty Pryde

=== Other contributions ===
- soundtrack for the Canadian-American romantic comedy-drama film Noah's Arc: Jumping the Broom (2008), directed by Patrik-Ian Polk
- soundtrack for the short documentary film Beauty CuLTure, directed by Lauren Greenfield
- an instrumental version of the band's song "In Ruins" was featured in the episode "Unfriendly Chat" (2010) of the American police-procedural television series CSI: NY and was also featured in the episode "Gentle Puppies" (2010) of the American dark-comedy drama television series Weeds

=== Music videos ===
- 200 Words directed by Aaron Ohlmann
- Cable TV directed by Chris Wilcha
- No Wedding Cake directed by Nancy Jean Tucker
- The Longer U Wait directed by Chris Wilcha

== See also ==
- List of Asthmatic Kitty Records artists
- List of bands from Los Angeles
- List of synthpop artists
- Music of Los Angeles
