= Part I: John Shade, Your Fortune's Made =

Studio album by Fol Chen
- Released: 17 February 2009
- Genre: Indie pop
- Length: 41:35
- Label: Asthmatic Kitty

Fol Chen chronology
Part I: John Shade, Your Fortune's Made (2009)	The Longer U Wait (2009)

Professional ratings
Review scores
Source	Rating
AllMusic	4/5 stars
Pitchfork Media	6.9/10
Spin	(favorable)

Part I: John Shade, Your Fortune's Made is the first studio album by the Los Angeles band Fol Chen. It was released on Asthmatic Kitty Records in February 2009.
