= Tenonitis =

- Specialty: Ophthalmology

Tenonitis is a rare eye disease that is represented by inflammation of Tenon's capsule. Tenon's capsule, also known as the fascial sheath of the eyeball, is a structure surrounding the eyeball, and when it becomes inflamed it may cause issues in regards to vision. Also known as orbital tenonitis, tenonitis is associated with the SLC26A3 gene. The inflammation of the Tenon capsule resulting from heightened blood flow may also affect the lacrimal gland and the extraocular muscles.

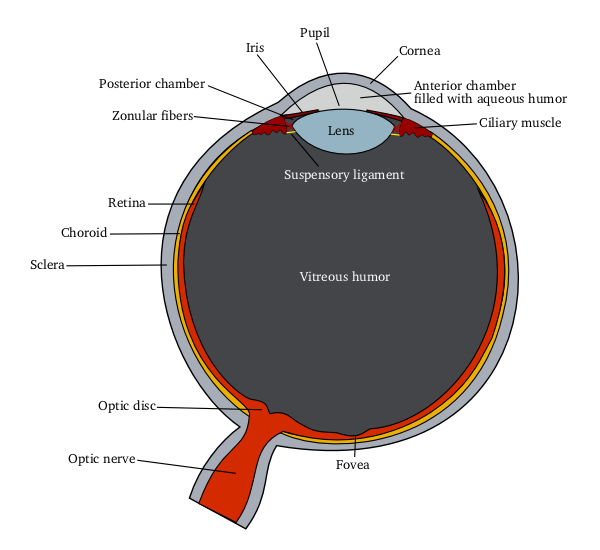
Eye anatomy

== Signs and symptoms ==
Signs and symptoms depend on the severity of the case with tenonitis. In mild cases it may just be an uncomfortable sensation in the eye socket. In extreme cases it may cause permanent blindness or eye removal is needed.

- Swelling
- Intraocular pressure
- Blindness

== Causes ==
There are no specific causes of this disease. With this being so rare not enough research has been allocated to pinpoint a specific cause of this disease. The main thing that we know about this disease is that the inflammation of the Tenon capsule may be related to macular retinal edema and intraocular pressure quantitative trait locus.

== Mechanism ==
With the lack of research and understanding about this specific disease it is hard to come up with a mechanism that outlines how this arises in the body. Although we cannot pinpoint specifically how it occurs, there are some findings that may help us get to that point in the future. A gene that is associated with orbital tenonitis is the SLC26A3 gene. This gene mediates chloride and bicarbonate exchange and additionally transports sulfate and other anions at the apical membrane, part of the plasma membrane of enterocytes. It is also known that related phenotypes are Increased shRNA abundance (Z-score > 2).

== Diagnosis ==
Tenonitis can be identified and diagnosed a few different ways. Tenon's capsule may have inflammation from a disease called idiopathic orbital inflammation syndrome. There is no history of trauma or adjacent focus of infection with this disease. In order to diagnose tenonitis some type of imaging is needed, such as a CT or MRI. The imaging is used to capture the inflammation and to spot any possible chance of infection. For chronic diseases a biopsy may be needed to determine an underlying condition that may be causing the recurring inflammation.

== Treatment ==
The main course of treatment for this specific disease would be to surgically excise the capsule. There is no info that implies the inflammation of this capsule will go down over time so the known course of action would be to have it surgically removed in order to relieve discomfort and to prevent further irritation to this area.

== Prognosis ==
Although this may not be a lethal disease, it will progressively get worse over time. Depending on the severity of the disease, this may have months of progression. When going past 3 months of having issues, the main course of action would be to surgically relieve the pain or total excision of the affected area.

== Epidemiology ==
This disease has no specific population it targets more. With the information that is provided by previous research, this is a typically universal disease that can affect any population.

== Research Directions ==
Currently there haven't been many studies conducted in regards to Tenon's capsule. In one study the objective was to see the efficacy of excision of the capsule by way of trabeculectomy alone, and also combined with partial tenonectomy. There is further research needed to be done to determine the cause of this specific disease, what happens during the progression of it, and treatment plans that need to be put in place.
