= Kellan Lutz =

American actor (born 1985)

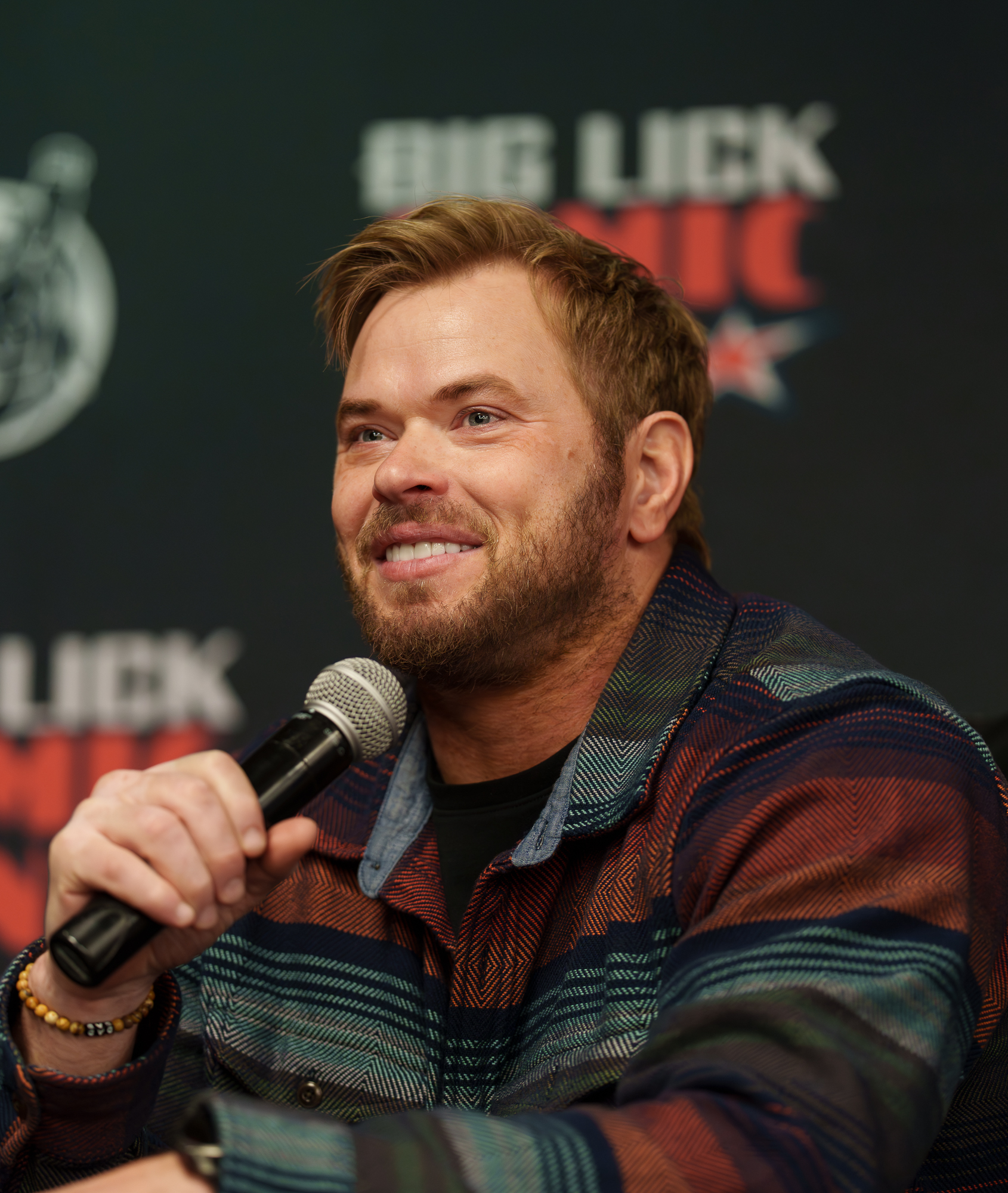
- Lutz at Big Lick Comic Con in Roanoke, Virginia in 2026
- Born: March 15, 1985 (age 41); Dickinson, North Dakota, U.S
- Occupations: Actor; model
- Years active: 2004–present
- Spouse: Brittany Gonzales (m. 2017)
- Children: 2

Kellan Christopher Lutz (born March 15, 1985) is an American actor and model. He made his film debut in Stick It (2006), and is best known for playing Emmett Cullen in The Twilight Saga film series (2008–2012). He has since played Poseidon in the 2011 film Immortals, voiced the title character in the 2013 animated film Tarzan, also played John Smilee in The Expendables 3 (2014), and Hercules in The Legend of Hercules (2014). He co-starred in the CBS action thriller series FBI: Most Wanted (2020–2021).

== Early life ==
Kellan Christopher Lutz was born on March 15, 1985, in Dickinson, North Dakota, the son of Karla (née Theesfeld; b. 1960) and Bradley Lutz (b. 1960), both of German descent. He has six brothers, Brandon, Tanner, David, Daniel, Brad, and Chris. Lutz grew up in the Midwest and in Arizona, and graduated from Horizon High School in Scottsdale, Arizona. Before deciding to pursue an acting career, he attended Chapman University to pursue a degree in chemical engineering.

== Career ==
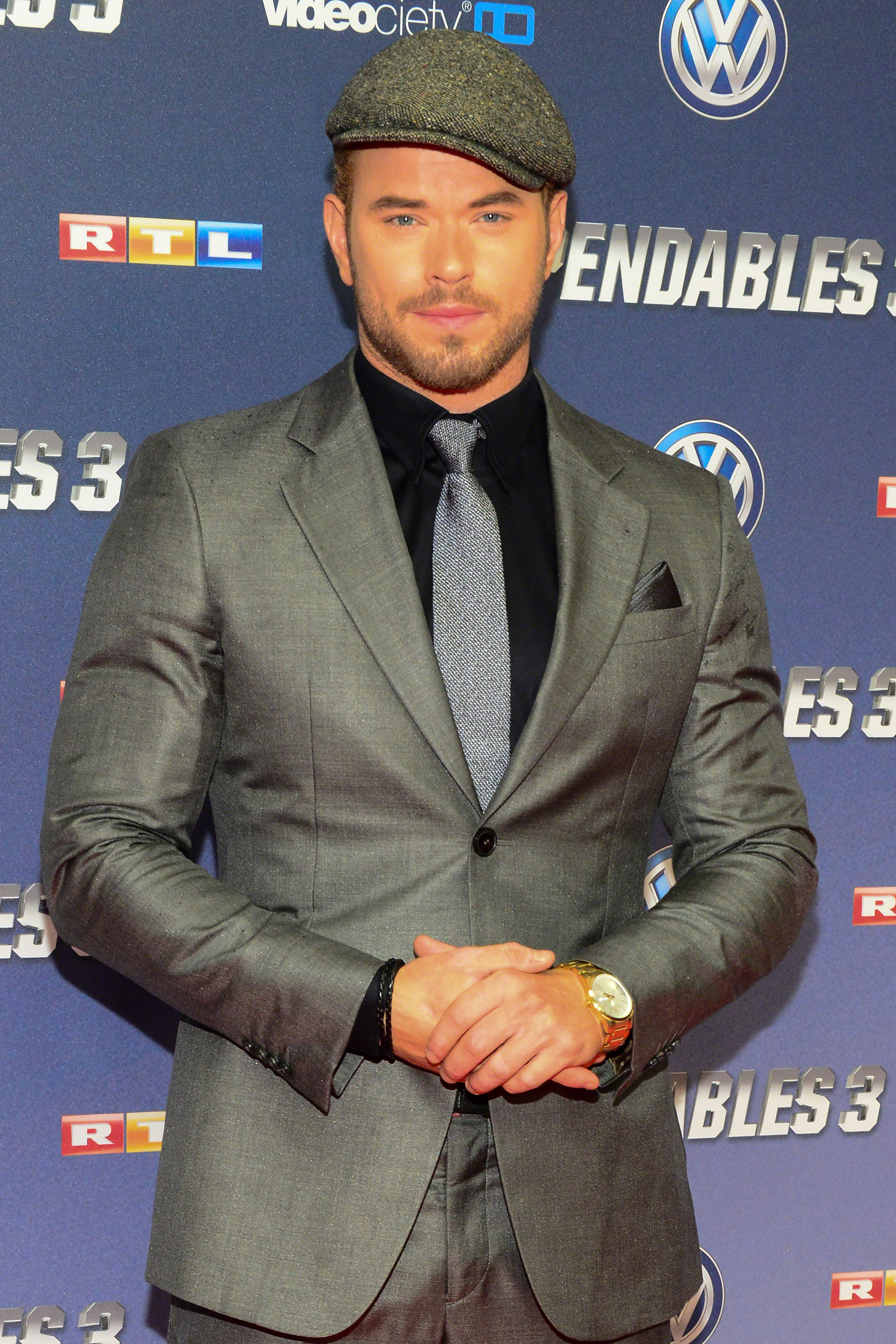
Lutz at the Germany premiere of The Expendables 3 in 2014

Lutz had recurring roles on Model Citizens (2004) and The Comeback (2005), and smaller roles in episodes of The Bold and the Beautiful, CSI: NY, Summerland, Six Feet Under, CSI: Crime Scene Investigation, and Heroes. He was also in the films Stick It (2006), Accepted (2006), and Prom Night (2008). Additionally, Lutz has performed on the California stage and was the host of Bravo's Blow Out. He also appeared in the 2006 commercial for Hilary Duff's fragrance With Love... Hilary Duff, and in the 2007 music video for her single, "With Love". In 2008, he appeared in another music video, Hinder's "Without You". In the same year, Lutz also appeared in the miniseries Generation Kill, based on the book by Evan Wright, and had a starring role in the film Deep Winter.

Lutz's big break came when he played Emmett Cullen in the film adaptations of the Twilight (2008) saga by Stephenie Meyer. He reprised his role for all four follow-up films, beginning with The Twilight Saga: New Moon (2009). He also appeared as George Evans in the 90210 spinoff (2009) on The CW. Lutz also appeared the 2010 remake A Nightmare on Elm Street as Dean, "a well-liked, well-off high school jock", in April 2010. He reprised his role as Emmett Cullen in the third installment of the Twilight saga, The Twilight Saga: Eclipse (2010), and then appeared as the feisty Poseidon, God of the Sea in Immortals (2011). Lutz reunited with his Twilight co-star and close friend, Ashley Greene, in the film A Warrior's Heart (2011). He was considered for the lead role in Conan the Barbarian (2011), but eventually lost out to Jason Momoa. He also reunited with his Immortals co-star Mickey Rourke in the action film Java Heat (2013), which was shot in Indonesia. In 2012, Lutz was one of the candidates for the male lead in the film Hansel and Gretel: Witch Hunters, a role that ultimately went to Jeremy Renner. Lutz starred in the epic The Legend of Hercules (2014), but the film was a critical and commercial failure, and Lutz was nominated for two Golden Raspberry Awards.

Lutz is signed with Ford Models. He is one of the models featured in the 2010 Calvin Klein X underwear campaign.

In 2012, Lutz made a special guest appearance on the TV show 30 Rock, playing a version of himself who is related to the character J.D. Lutz, played by actor John Lutz. In 2011 and 2012, he again portrayed Emmett Cullen, in the fourth and fifth Twilight installments, The Twilight Saga: Breaking Dawn – Part 1 and Part 2 (2012).

In 2016, Lutz starred in the thriller film Money with Jamie Bamber, Jesse Williams, and Jess Weixler directed by Martin Rosete and produced by Atit Shah. Lutz had also appeared as the main lead in Science Fiction Volume One: The Osiris Child and Guardians of the Tomb.

On June 24, 2016, Lutz tweeted that he had a meeting with McG and Mary Viola about playing the role of He-Man.

Beginning in 2020, Lutz played FBI Special Agent Kenny Crosby on CBS's FBI: Most Wanted. He left the role in the third-season premiere to move his family back to California.

== Philanthropy ==
Lutz's primary charity is "Saving Innocence" which works to rescue and rehabilitate child victims of sex trafficking in the United States. He was GQ's Gentleman of the Year for his work with this organization, and has been the organization's public ambassador since 2011. Lutz dedicates his birthday each year to financially benefit Saving Innocence, and runs campaigns for them on a regular basis.

In 2010, Lutz was a spokesman for PETA's "Adopt, Don't Buy" campaign. He is also a supporter of West African primate conservation charity Ape Action Africa, and used the Dublin premiere of the film Tarzan to raise funds for the charity's work to save endangered gorillas and chimpanzees. Lutz endorsed the documentary film The Paw Project, which focuses on the declawing of exotic and domesticated cats in America.

He is also a supporter of rebuilding efforts in New Orleans, in particular with the St. Bernard Project.

In 2013, he co-founded Foresight Creative Group, a product development company specifically focuses on his patents and inventions. The company, which is partnered in with various charities which he promotes on his social media outlets, released a sleep mask and a dice game named after Lutz.

== Personal life ==
Lutz enjoyed numerous outdoors and fitness activities. Lutz is black belt in Brazilian Jiu-Jitsu and Muay Thai. He is also a well trained boxer, and prefers to perform his own stunts when making films. Although Lutz enjoys watching crime movies, he prefers to star in action films. He is a Christian.

In October 2017, Lutz revealed that he was engaged to TV host and model Brittany Gonzales. On November 23, 2017, Lutz and Gonzales announced that they had married. On November 28, 2019, Lutz announced on his Instagram account that he and Gonzales were expecting a baby girl in 2020. On February 6, 2020, Gonzales announced the unexpected loss of their baby six months into the pregnancy. The couple's second pregnancy resulted in a daughter who was born in February 2021, and a son was born in August 2022.

== Filmography ==
=== Film ===
Year	Title	Role	Notes
2006	Stick It	Frank	
2006	Accepted	Dwayne	
2007	Ghosts of Goldfield	Chad	Direct to video
2008	Prom Night	Rick Leland	
2008	Deep Winter	Mark Rider	
2008	Twilight	Emmett Cullen	
2009	After Dusk They Come	Jake	
2009	The Twilight Saga: New Moon	Emmett Cullen	
2010	Meskada	Eddie Arlinger	
2010	A Nightmare on Elm Street	Dean Russell	
2010	The Twilight Saga: Eclipse	Emmett Cullen	
2011	A Warrior's Heart	Conor Sullivan	
2011	Love, Wedding, Marriage	Charlie	
2011	Arena	FBI Agent David Searle / David Lord / Death Dealer	
2011	The Twilight Saga: Breaking Dawn – Part 1	Emmett Cullen	
2011	Immortals	Poseidon	
2012	The Twilight Saga: Breaking Dawn – Part 2	Emmett Cullen	
2013	Java Heat	Jake Travers	
2013	Syrup	"Sneaky" Pete	
2013	Tarzan	Tarzan	Voice role
2014	The Legend of Hercules	Hercules	
2014	The Expendables 3	John Smilee	
2015	Experimenter	William Shatner	
2015	Extraction	Harry Turner	
2016	Money	Mark	
2016	The Osiris Child: Science Fiction Volume One	Sy Lombrok	
2017	Lima	Lima	Short film
2018	Guardians of the Tomb	Jack Ridley	
2019	What Men Want	Captain Fucktastic	
2020	Famous Adjacent	Himself	Short film
2020	Divertimento	Jonas Olsen	Short film
2022	What Remains	Troy	
2023	Come Out Fighting		
2023	Due Justice	Max Kelly	

=== Television ===
Year	Title	Role	Notes
2004	Model Citizens	Himself	Contestant
2004	The Bold and the Beautiful	Rob	Episode #1.4409
2005	CSI: NY	Alex Hopper	Episode: "Tri-Borough"
2005, 2014	The Comeback	Chris MacNess	14 episodes
2005	Six Feet Under	Critter	Episode: "Hold My Hand"
2005	Summerland	Fordie	2 episodes
2007	CSI: Crime Scene Investigation	Chris Mullins	Episode: "Empty Eyes"
2007	Heroes	Andy	Episode: "Five Years Gone"
2008	Generation Kill	Cpl. Jason Lilley	Miniseries
2008–09	90210	George Evans	6 episodes
2009	Valley Peaks	Kyle McBride	2 episodes
2012	Punk'd	Himself	Guest host
2012	30 Rock	Himself	Episode: "Unwindulax"
2014	The High Fructose Adventures of Annoying Orange	King Potadectes / Pie-Clops	Episode: "Mash of the Titans"
2015	Bullseye	Himself	Host
2019–21	FBI	Special Agent Kenny Crosby	3 episodes
2020–21	FBI: Most Wanted	Special Agent Kenny Crosby	Main role (Seasons 1–3)
2021	FBI: International	Special Agent Kenny Crosby	Episode: "Pilot"
2022	The Guardians of Justice	King Tsunami	Recurring Role

=== Music videos ===
Year	Title	Artist
2007	"With Love"	Hilary Duff
2008	"Without You"	Hinder
2012	"Put Your Hands Up"	Matchbox Twenty

== Bibliography ==
- Lutz, Kellan; Lutz, Brittany (April 6, 2027). Weathering Together: Enduring Life's Storms, Hand in Hand, Anchored in Faith. New York: Penguin Random House. ISBN 979-8-2171-5356-5.

== Awards and nominations ==
Year	Award	Category	Work	Result
2010	Teen Choice Awards	Choice Movie: Scene Stealer Male	The Twilight Saga: New Moon	Won
2011	Teen Choice Awards	Choice Movie: Male Scene Stealer	The Twilight Saga: Eclipse	Won
2012	Teen Choice Awards	Choice Movie Scene Stealer: Male	The Twilight Saga: Breaking Dawn – Part 1	Won
2013	Teen Choice Awards	Choice Movie Scene Stealer	The Twilight Saga: Breaking Dawn – Part 2	Won
2014	Teen Choice Awards	Choice Movie Actor: Action	The Legend of Hercules	Nominated
2014	Young Hollywood Awards	Super Superhero	The Legend of Hercules	Won
2014	Young Hollywood Awards	Hottest Body	—N/a	Nominated
2015	Golden Raspberry Awards	Worst Actor	The Legend of Hercules	Nominated
2015	Golden Raspberry Awards	Worst Screen Combo	The Legend of Hercules	Nominated
2016	Northeast Film Festival	Best Actor in a Feature Film	Money	Nominated
2016	Orlando Film Festival	Best Ensemble Cast	Money	Nominated
