= Money (2016 film) =

Film by Martin Rosete

- Official poster
- Directed by: Martin Rosete
- Written by: Josep Ciutat
- Produced by: Atit Shah
- Starring: Jamie Bamber; Kellan Lutz; Jesse Williams; Jess Weixler; Lucia Guerrero
- Cinematography: Jose Martín Rosete
- Production companies: Create Entertainment; Kamel Films
- Distributed by: 20th Century Fox Home Entertainment; Netflix
- Release dates: April 6, 2016 (Palm Beach); May 12, 2017 (Spain); June 27, 2017 (United States)
- Running time: 86 minutes
- Countries: United States; Spain
- Language: English
- Box office: $3,041

Money is a 2016 crime thriller film directed by Martin Rosete, written by Josep Ciutat and produced by Atit Shah. The film stars Jamie Bamber, Kellan Lutz, Jesse Williams and Jess Weixler.

Initiating principal photography from June 9, 2015, in Woodbury, Long Island, Money marks the feature debut of Martin Rosete., one of Spain's most talked-about shorts/commercials directors.

The film screened at over 50 festivals worldwide, winning over 25 awards including Best Picture, Best Director, Best Actor, Best Screenplay, Best Editing, Best Producer and Best Sound Design. The film screened in the US at Sarasota Film Festival, Palm Beach International Film Festival, Newport Beach Film Festival; in the United Kingdom at Raindance Film Festival; in Italy at Rome Independent Film Festival and in Spain at Festival de cine fantástico in Málaga, Spain.

Money was released theatrically in Spain on May 12, 2017, and in home markets in the United States, United Kingdom and worldwide beginning June 27, 2017, by 20th Century Fox Home Entertainment.

Netflix released the film worldwide on October 15, 2017.

The Palm Beach Post said of the film, "A violent thriller of captor and captives, with plenty of reversals, adding up to a familiar, but entertaining white-knuckle entertainment."

== Plot ==
Sylvia Dudek, an art professional, discusses seeking funding to open her own gallery with her gardener, Carl before her husband Mark arrives home, stashing two briefcases away in the basement and a bedroom closet, depositing the money from one in a safe. Later that evening they have a dinner party with Mark's colleague and co-conspirator in an industrial espionage scheme. Sean brings his girlfriend Christina with him, and they have a polite evening marred by awkward moments brought about by Sean's rudeness.

John arrives claiming to be a new neighbour and a consultant, he is initially turned away by Sylvia but is invited in after complimenting her taste in fashion and presenting an expensive bottle of wine. Joining the party in the garden he appears well-mannered, cultured and knowledgeable but soon reveals he is aware of the men's espionage and their payoff of five million dollars in cash as well as various personal details. He threatens them with a gun and tells them he intends to cut off Sean's fingers one at a time unless the money is brought to him. Mark and Sean protest their innocence before John grabs Sean's hand, at which point he confesses that his share is in the basement. Christina retrieves the briefcase, taking a small stack of bills for herself. John demands the rest of the money, then cuts off Sean's index finger. Christina pepper sprays John, and he is knocked out after a short struggle.

The group take John hostage, tied to a chair while they debate the correct course of action. Sylvia wants to release him and let him take half of the money. Sean believes they should kill John because they can't trust him to leave their lives alone, especially after deducing he has intercepted their communications. Sean's increasing cocaine usage makes the others mistrust and fear his impulsiveness, but Mark privately agrees that he should be killed. Mark reveals to Sylvia that they have been living beyond their means and their investments have been lost, leaving them on the verge of bankruptcy, meanwhile John manipulates Christina into untying him before riling Sean to attempt to torture him only to retaliate and knock him out. Mark gives John an incorrect code to his safe containing the remaining money and tells him the safe is time-locked and will not open for another eight hours. John hits Mark with the butt of his pistol and knocks him unconscious.

Mark awakes on a dock at the edge of his pond, tied to a cinder block. John tells him to re-evaluate his priorities before kicking the block in and almost drowns Mark, who sees Sean's dead body under the surface. He agrees to John's demands, but insists the safe cannot be opened until morning. John relents and locks him in the basement. John and Sylvia bond over a discussion of their appreciation for literature, and she cleans and bandages John's head wound. John reveals that he knows from his surveillance of the couple that Sylvia is pregnant and has not told Mark, saying he would not make a good father but she would be a good mother.

In the morning, Carl arrives and is heard by Mark who tells him to rescue Sylvia and Christina while John takes him to unlock the safe, which he does and talks briefly with Sylvia while Christina sleeps. John takes the money from the safe and the briefcase from downstairs and leaves, telling the hostages to give a false physical description to the police. Sylvia packs a bag and tells Mark she is divorcing him. John escapes to a barn where he has stashed a motorcycle and unloads one briefcase of money into the saddlebags before discovering the other has been filled with books, which amuses him. Sylvia meets with Carl and offers him a share of the money, which he happily rejects. The film ends with Sylvia and John driving away separately, each with two and a half million dollars.

== Cast ==
- Jamie Bamber as John
- Kellan Lutz as Mark
- Jesse Williams as Sean
- Jess Weixler as Sylvia
- Lucia Guerrero as Christina
- Fredric Lehne as Carl

== Production ==
=== Development ===
From a screenplay by Barcelona's Josep Ciutat, Money marks the feature debut of one of Spain's most talked-about shorts/commercials directors, Martin Rosete, who leapt to attention with the 2012 Tribeca Fest-selected sci fi drama Voice Over, which won over 100 prizes. Equity financed, and to be shot at night, Money is "a contained thriller," Rosete told Variety. “I love creating atmosphere and great visuals, but the main attraction of Money will be working in depth with its actors," he added. Still running a production company in Madrid, Rosete is a leading light of the diaspora of new generation Spanish filmmakers who, as Spain sunk into crisis, have had to travel abroad to launch their careers, for a lack of financing for first-time directors in Spain.

Producer Atit Shah and his company Create Entertainment handled development, packaging, and production of the film in cooperation with Rosete's company Kamel Films based in Madrid, Spain.

=== Casting ===
On June 9, 2015 Variety announced that Jamie Bamber, Kellan Lutz, Jesse Williams and Jess Weixler had joined the cast. Sig de Miguel and Steven Vincent are credited as Casting Directors. Lutz famously played Emmett Cullen in The Twilight Saga before starring in The Legend of Hercules and Limning Smiley in The Expendables 3. Bamber starred in Battlestar Galactica and NCIS: Naval Criminal Investigative Service. Weixler won a Sundance Fest Special Jury prize for her lead performance in Teeth. Williams is best known for his role as Dr. Jackson Avery in Grey's Anatomy.

=== Filming ===
Principal photography began in Long Island, New York on June 9, 2015, over a period of 16 days. On June 19 Lutz reported that a 16-page scene was completed in one day.

== Reception ==
The Palm Beach Post praised the acting stating that "Yes, Money is bound to remind you of other films of captors and captives, but the performances by cold-blooded intruder Jamie Bamber as John, drugged up Jesse Williams as Sean and the rest of the ensemble cast should keep you gripping the armrests of your theater seat". They added "A violent thriller of captor and captives, with plenty of reversals, adding up to a familiar, but entertaining white knuckle entertainment."

Money has been on a worldwide festival tour that has included 23 wins and over 50 nominations including Best Picture wins in Xi'an, China at the 3rd annual Silk Road International Film Festival and in New York at the Long Beach International Film Festival. The film has held screenings in Argentina, Ecuador, Greece, Italy, Spain, Sudan, United Kingdom and the United States where it has played in over 20 cities.

The film released theatrically in Spain May 12, 2017 and in home markets worldwide and in the United States, Canada and UK on June 27, 2017.

Money became available on Netflix October 15, 2017 in the over 190 countries the platform currently serves.
