= There's No I in America =

- 30 Rock episode
- Episode no.: Season 7 Episode 5
- Directed by: John Riggi
- Written by: Josh Siegal; Dylan Morgan
- Production code: 705
- Original air date: October 31, 2012

Guest appearances
- Brian Williams as himself; Jessica Leccia as Maria

Episode chronology
← Previous "Unwindulax"	Next → "Aunt Phatso vs. Jack Donaghy"
- 30 Rock season 7

"There's No I in America" is the fifth episode of the seventh season of the American television comedy series 30 Rock, and the 130th overall episode of the series. It was directed by John Riggi and written by Josh Siegal and Dylan Morgan. The episode originally aired on NBC in the United States on October 31, 2012.

"There's No I in America" was watched by 3.38 million viewers and received a positive response from critics. It is the second half of a two-part episode, preceded by "Unwindulax". The episode title references the phrase "There's no I in team", even though there is actually an I in America. It aired on a Wednesday night due to a shuffling of broadcasts for the week due to Hurricane Sandy coverage and the desire to air the election-themed episode before the actual election.

== Plot ==
Picking up exactly where "Unwindulax" left off, Jack and Liz have each realized that the 2012 Presidential election will be decided by a group of Northern Florida voters who are devoted fans of Jenna Maroney's latest single, "Catching Crabs in Paradise." Therefore, Jenna is likely to decide the next president of the United States. Jenna, however pays no attention to politics. In an attempt to sway Jenna to their respective parties' side, Liz and Jack hold a formal debate moderated by Jenna. Jack wins the debate by not focusing on the issues, but rather by pointing out that Jenna will be the coolest celebrity in the Republican Party. He also gives a speech filled with meaningless buzzwords. Liz attempts to convince Jack to not let Jenna endorse anyone, claiming no one should live in a world where Jenna Maroney is the most important woman in America. Jack, however, rejects her attempts at emotional manipulation.

Utilizing Tracy's penchant for making horrible jokes about recently deceased celebrities, Liz logs him into Jenna's Twitter account and sets him loose. Tracy's work gets Jenna banned from social media before she can endorse Mitt Romney. Meanwhile, Jack has a conversation with a young girl who wants to be an entrepreneur. However, he discovers that the girl has become inspired by Jenna's success, hoping to skip business school and get implants. He decides he cannot go through with his plan. In the end, Jenna endorses neither candidate, while Liz and Jack settle their differences. They each acknowledge that they've rubbed off on one another.

Meanwhile, Pete is attempting to get everyone as excited for this election as they were in 2008. He claims to be genuinely invested in the outcome, but it is clear he is really attempting to recreate the moment of Obama's election. During the 2008 election, Pete received an elated kiss from Maria, one of the security guards. No one else is excited by the election and Maria plans to leave work before the results are announced. Pete grows increasingly desperate, even attempting to get Brian Williams to call the election early. He is eventually provoked into a furious rant about how he wants to recreate the moment of the kiss. At the time, everything seemed possible and optimistic for Pete, but nothing in his life has changed in the 4 years since. When he makes a last-ditch attempt to prevent Maria from leaving, she kindly tells him to move on. She then leaves with her boyfriend, "Peter Horn", who is Pete's cooler, luxuriously-haired doppelganger.

In a third subplot, Kenneth receives his absentee ballot from his hometown and is thrilled to be voting for the first time. However, he is frustrated to learn that he doesn't know enough to make many informed decisions about the issues on the ballot. He is advised that nobody does and winds up sending his ballot off (by bald eagle) just before the polls close. He encounters a disappointed Pete and his enthusiasm about the election prompts Pete to give him a passionate kiss.

== Reception ==
"There's No I in America" was watched by 3.38 million viewers and earned a 1.1 rating/4 share in the 18–49 demographic. This means that it was seen by 1.1 percent of all 18- to 49-year-olds, and 4 percent of all 18- to 49-year-olds watching television at the time of the broadcast. This was an increase from the previous episode "Unwindulax" (3.13 million).

Critical response for "There's No I in America" was moderately positive. Amy Amatangelo of Paste magazine gave the episode a 7.9 out of 10 and praised the Liz/Jack dynamic, but was critical of the plot's main focus on Jenna. The A.V. Club gave the episode a B−.
