= Unwindulax =

- 30 Rock episode
- Episode no.: Season 7 Episode 4
- Directed by: James E. Sheridan
- Written by: Matt Hubbard
- Production code: 704
- Original air date: October 25, 2012

Guest appearances
- Kellan Lutz as himself; Don Cheadle as himself; Amy Sedaris as Visor Lady; Gary Cole as Roger

Episode chronology
← Previous "Stride of Pride"	Next → "There's No I in America"
- 30 Rock season 7

"Unwindulax" (/ʌnˈwaɪndjʊlæks/), a portmanteau of unwind and relax, is the fourth episode of the seventh season of the American television comedy series 30 Rock, and the 129th overall episode of the series. It was directed by James E. Sheridan and written by Matt Hubbard. The episode originally aired on NBC in the United States on October 25, 2012.

In the episode, Jenna Maroney attempts to create the image of herself as a "chilled" out person, while the regrouping of "The Pranksmen" threatens to shatter this image. A parallel storyline follows Jack Donaghy taking Liz Lemon to a Republican Party fundraiser. He uses her as bait to get the attendees to contribute more money to the Romney campaign.

"Unwindulax" was watched by 3.13 million viewers and received a positive critical response. It is the first half of a two-part episode, concluded by "There's No I in America".

== Plot ==
Jack (Alec Baldwin) invites Liz (Tina Fey) to a Republican Party fundraiser as his "chum." The pair agree that Liz will keep her liberal politics to herself in exchange for access to the all-you-can-eat shrimp bar. Once at the party, Jack provokes Liz into an anti-conservative rant, which he uses as bait for getting the attendees to contribute more money to the Romney campaign. Realizing Jack has manipulated her, Liz is furious and receives a lecture from Jack about the power of money over ideas. Determined to prove Jack wrong, Liz decides to promote the Democratic Party through TGS. She uses Lutz's grand nephew Kellan Lutz as a guest star on TGS to promote her liberal political views. Meanwhile, Jack is outraged to learn that the Romney campaign has all the money it needs and is looking for ideas. Jack uses his donation money in an attempt to lure minorities into the Romney camp, paying Don Cheadle $10 million to appear in a Romney campaign commercial. Both of their attempts fail: Grizz and Dot Com are horrified by Jack's commercial and the audience cheers so loud at Kellan Lutz's appearance (and the subsequent removal of his shirt) that they drown out what he is saying.

Elsewhere, Jenna's (Jane Krakowski) new "chilled" out public image, a result of her song "Catching Crabs in Paradise," has attracted the attention of a group of hard-partying fans who proclaim themselves "Crabcatchers." The "Crabcatchers" have started a 24-hour party outside 30 Rock in preparation for Jenna's appearance on the Today Show. Pete is nearly driven insane by the noise outside his office and the other members of the staff are similarly inconvenienced, but Jenna rejects any attempts to send her fans home. When Toofer, Frank, and Lutz realize that she can't afford to shatter her image by being her usual high-maintenance self in front of her fans, they torment her publicly while she is unable to retaliate. Their plans backfire when Jenna threatens to use her fame with America's white trash to destroy their lives. The writers collect all of Jenna's most horrible moments and plan to release them on the internet. However, Pete thwarts their plans. He destroys the compilation DVD of Jenna's embarrassing moments that "The Pranksmen" created because Jenna's fans have given him peace and relaxation.

Tracy (Tracy Morgan), who has a unique understanding of America after performing stand-up all over the country, teaches Liz about the US election map. Simultaneously, Jack does the same for representatives of the Romney campaign. At the same time, Tracy and Jack both realize that Northern Florida will decide the election and that a substantial chunk of the region's population includes Jenna's "Crabcatcher" fans. Hence, they both come to the conclusion that Jenna Maroney could decide the presidential election.

== Continuity ==
Two episodes earlier in Governor Dunston, Jenna solicits song ideas from Kenneth's mother's "friend" Ron. Ron sang about "being on a tropical island, and sipping some rum, and feeling the sand between your toes" in Key West.

== Reception ==
"Unwindulax" was watched by 3.13 million viewers and earned a 1.2 rating/4 share in the 18–49 demographic. This means that it was seen by 1.2 percent of all 18- to 49-year-olds, and 4 percent of all 18- to 49-year-olds watching television at the time of the broadcast. This was an increase from the previous episode "Stride of Pride" (3.04 million).

"Unwindulax" received a positive critical response. Amy Amatangelo of Paste magazine gave the episode an 8.1 out of 10 and praised the political humor centered on the 2012 Presidential election. Pilot Viruet of The A.V. Club gave the episode a "B", stating "For the most part, 'Unwindulax' was a funny episode but one that fell a little flat after three straight episodes that were firing on all cylinders. There is the very likely possibility that I’ll love this episode a lot more in context next week, because man, oh man, I’m looking forward to watching Jenna choose the next President of the United States."
