= The Paw Project =

- Directed by: Jennifer Conrad
- Written by: Jennifer Conrad
- Produced by: Audrey Steele Burnand; Jennifer Conrad; James Jensvold; The Paw Project
- Starring: Jennifer Conrad; John Duran; Jackson Galaxy; Aubrey Lavizzo
- Edited by: Allan Holzman
- Music by: Bobby Tahouri
- Release date: September 27, 2013
- Running time: 58 minutes
- Country: United States
- Language: English

The Paw Project is a 2013 documentary film that focuses on the declawing of both exotic and domesticated cats in the United States. The film follows the crusade of veterinarian Dr. Jennifer Conrad, who campaigns to have declawing bans enacted in a number of cities. The Paw Project is also the name of the nonprofit organization founded by Conrad over the course of the film.

== Synopsis ==
Dr. Jennifer Conrad is a veterinarian who treats animals in Hollywood. She focuses on large exotic cats that are used in films or shows or live in animal sanctuaries. One of her patients is the fully declawed tiger who appears in the 2009 film The Hangover. Conrad finds that the cats she is working with are suffering greatly because of elective onychectomy surgeries, commonly known as declawing, that are being performed on them. Often these surgeries are undertaken with the intent on making the animal safer to work with, but, ironically, make the animals more irritable and can change their behavior.

Conrad pays for eight large exotic cats with her own money to undergo surgery to help repair their declawing operations that have left them unable to walk without pain. She realizes that the scope of declawing is much more than she can handle alone, and eventually sets up a 501 (c)(3) charity called the Paw Project to help fund surgeries for these large cats. Conrad then goes on to focus on domestic cats in the film as well, citing that up to 22 million cats are declawed in the United States alone.

The Paw Project follows Conrad through attempts in California to ban declawing procedures. In 2003, the city of West Hollywood became the first city in the United States to ban declawing. Conrad worked closely with Mayor John Duran to help this pass against opposition from many veterinary associations. Eventually, legislation is passed in seven more Californian cities, including Los Angeles, San Francisco, Burbank, Santa Monica, Berkeley, Beverly Hills and Culver City. The film includes a listing of the countries in where declawing is illegal, including Australia, Brazil, the Netherlands, Germany, Austria, Switzerland, the United Kingdom and others.

The main message of the film is to raise awareness and for the United States to make declawing illegal. Since the filming of The Paw Project, the United States Department of Agriculture had enacted a ban on the declawing and defanging of wild and exotic carnivores. The Paw Project organization and Conrad are continuing work for legislation that would make declawing illegal for domestic cats as well. In 2012, the Paw Project sponsored legislation that prohibits landlords from requiring declawing or devocalization of pets as a condition of tenancy.

== Cast ==
- Dr. Jennifer Conrad
- John Duran
- Jackson Galaxy
- Dr. Aubrey Lavizzo

== Reception ==
The Paw Project has overall received positive reviews from its reviewers. It has been called "an inspiring David and Goliath story of a grassroots movement" and "A beautiful film. A powerful revolution."

Deep Roots magazine said "this is a movie that was fashioned with great care, skill and passion, a flick that bespeaks such precision and wise gambits that it seems too glib, maybe even too inaccurate, to use the word 'flick'." Deep Roots was followed by Animals Today Radio, who issued the statement about The Paw Project: "The film is a moving and inspiring account of the cruelty of feline declawing and the efforts to ban it."

The Portland Book Review said "Everyone needs to see this stunning documentary. The images will break your heart, while at the same time reminding you how beautiful these creatures truly are. This documentary will motivate you to speak up for all animals who can't speak for themselves."

Actor Kellan Lutz endorsed the movie in September 2013, posting on Twitter: "Hey team, take a moment and check out @PawProject. This inspiring story aims to increase awareness of the cruelty of declawing." The Paw Project was also endorsed by television personality and animal advocate Wendy Diamond as well as internet celebrity Randall of The Crazy Nastyass Honey Badger viral video.

== See also ==
- Onychectomy
- Animal cruelty
- Animal rights
- Overview of discretionary invasive procedures on animals
- Veterinary medicine
