= Onychectomy =

Surgical removal of an animal's claws

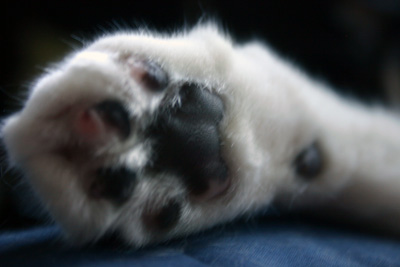
Close-up of a declawed paw

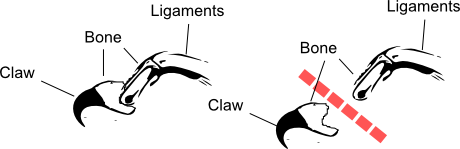
Diagram showing location of amputation

Onychectomy, popularly known as declawing, is an operation to remove an animal's claws surgically by means of the amputation of all or part of the distal phalanges, or end bones, of the animal's toes. Because the claw develops from germinal tissue within the third phalanx, amputation of the bone is necessary to fully remove the claw. The terms onychectomy (origin: Greek ὄνυξ onyx, 'nail' + ἐκτομή ektomē, 'excision') and declawing imply mere claw removal, but a more appropriate description would be phalangectomy, excision of toe bone.

Although it has been somewhat common in Canada and the United States, declawing is considered an act of animal cruelty in many countries, (see "Declawing practices" below) as it causes physical and psychological suffering to the animal (although the extent of this suffering is subject to debate).

== Medically indicated onychectomy ==
Onychectomy can be a treatment for comminuted fractures, pseudarthrosis, intraarticular fractures, irreparable luxation, neoplasia, and chronic infections.

== Elective onychectomy ==
Elective onychectomy is usually done on all toes on the front paws. Sometimes the rear paws are declawed as well.

Despite the fact that it is a surgery without medical cause, in some parts of the world, particularly in Northern America, declawing was for many years a relatively standard practice, and "surveys of routine elective procedures" in 1988 and 1996 showed it was performed along with neutering in more than 20% of cases.

Although increasingly controversial, when the procedure is presented and perceived as mundane and innocuous, non-medical reasons for this procedure can be convincing:

=== Risks from scratching ===
Data on relinquishment to shelters indicate that many owners relinquish cats who engage in unwanted scratching. For example, a survey of veterinarians in Brazil reported scratching as the second-most-given behavioural reason for abandonment of cats.

While sometimes framed as concern for household possessions, people are indeed concerned with pain and infection, although the U.S. Centers for Disease Control do not recommend declawing to prevent cat scratch disease, even for felines in contact with immunocompromised humans.

== Methods ==
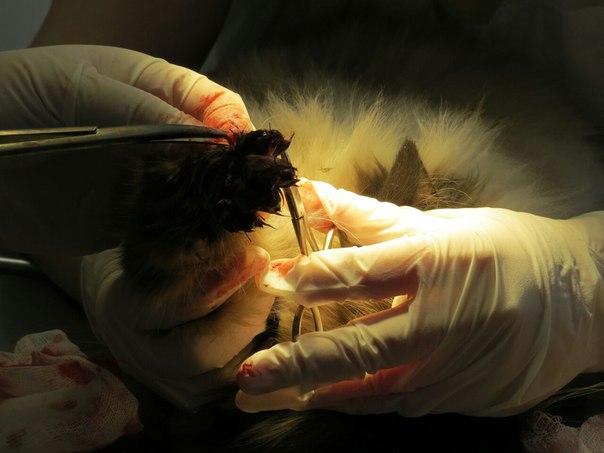
Onychectomy being performed

Despite the prevalence of elective onychectomy in North America, no standard practices exist regarding the surgical techniques or surgical tools used, the administration of post-operative analgesics or other follow-up care, or the optimal age or other attributes of cats undergoing the procedure. There are three surgical methods: scalpel blade, guillotine trimmers, and laser.

No technique or method has been proven to eliminate the many complications associated with declawing. The International Society of Feline Medicine states that "Even if future improvements in surgical techniques can negate some of the adverse effects associated with declawing, iCatCare and ISFM believe this procedure is unethical other than if required to manage a medical condition and should be banned."

== Recovery, health and behavioral effects ==
Onychectomy is an orthopedic surgery involving one (or more) separate phalangeal amputations, which requires general anesthesia and multi-modal pain management before, during, and after surgery.

A 2018 study by Martell-Moran, et al. found, in a study of 274 cats, that "declawing cats increases the risk of unwanted behaviors and may increase risk for developing back pain. Evidence of inadequate surgical technique was common in the study population. Among declawed cats, retained P3 fragments further increased the risk of developing back pain and adverse behaviors. The use of optimal surgical technique does not eliminate the risk of adverse behavior subsequent to onychectomy." The study found that inappropriate toileting, biting, aggression and overgrooming occurred significantly more often in the declawed cats than the non-declawed cats (roughly seven, four and three times more often, respectively, based on the calculated odds ratio). A declawed cat was also almost three times more likely to be diagnosed with back pain than a non-declawed cat (potentially due to shortening of the declawed limb and altered gait, and/or chronic pain at the site of the surgery causing compensatory weight shift to the pelvic limbs).

In a survey of 276 cat owners, 34% reported post-surgical discomfort in their cats while 78% reported primarily tenderness. Recovery time took from three days to two weeks. Increased biting strength or frequency was reported in 4% of cats, but overall, 96% of owners were satisfied with the surgery. Some other studies found lameness after onychectomy lasting >3 days, >1 week, 8 days, > 12 days, 180 days, and 96 months.

At one veterinary teaching hospital, between 50 and 80% of cats had one or more medical complications post-surgery; 19.8% developed complications after release. Other studies have reported medical post-op complication rates as 24%, 53%, 1.4%, 82.5% for blade and 51.5% for shear technique, and 80%. Reported medical complications include: pain, hemorrhage, laceration of paw pads, swelling, reluctance to bear weight on affected limb, neuropraxia, radial nerve damage, lameness, infection, abscess, tissue necrosis, wound dehiscence, incomplete healing, protrusion of 2nd (middle) phalanx, claw regrowth, scurs (growth of deformed claw segments), retention of flexor process of third phalanx, chronic draining tracts, self-mutilation, dermatitis, lethargy, palmigrade stance (walking on wrists), chronic intermittent lameness, chronic pain syndrome, flexor tendon contracture, and cystitis (stress-associated bladder inflammation). Claw regrowth has been seen by veterinarians anywhere from weeks up to 15 years after onychectomy.

In post-operation follow ups Yeon, et al. (2001) found six of thirty-nine cats (15%~) were house soiling and seven (18%) had increased biting frequency or intensity. The authors concluded based on this and previous studies that "behavioral problems following onychectomy were not pronounced". Follow-ups in this study were conducted an average of eleven and a half months after surgery.

Behavior problems are a primary cause of cats being relinquished to shelters. Proponents of declawing argue that declawing reduces undesired behaviors (scratching) and thus reduces the likelihood of relinquishment. Opponents of declawing argue the surgery itself creates more behavioral problems leading to relinquishment of cats. A study by Patronek et al. (1996) found in a univariate analysis that declawed cats were only 63% as likely to be relinquished as non-declawed cats. A multivariate analysis conducted in the same study shows odds of being relinquished to a shelter were 89% higher for declawed cats. The authors concluded that the conflicting results of the two analyses made it difficult to interpret the effects of declawing. In a shelter setting, more declawed cats were reported by their owners to have problems with inappropriate elimination (house soiling). However, this study ultimately found no association between the declaw status of cats and their aggression towards humans or frequency of inappropriate elimination (house soiling).

In another study, 16% of declawed cats developed behavior problems (12% biting), and more declawed (55%) than clawed (45%) cats were referred to a vet teaching hospital for behavior problems. This was the second-longest follow-up period (2 years) ever examined.

Patronek, Glickman and Beck (1996) found no association between the declaw status of cats and the frequency of inappropriate elimination (house soiling).

In another study of 275 cats, 11 cats (4%) developed or had worse behavior problems post-declawing; 5 clients (less than 1%) reported that their cats had developed litterbox and biting problems.

Chronic pain syndrome of onychectomy has been described by a pain management specialist as leading to unwanted behaviors, including increased aggression.

A prospective study comparing declawing with tendonectomy noted many medical as well as behavior complications.

An internet survey found that declawed cats were more likely to jump on tables and counters and house-soiled more than non-declawed cats (25% vs. 15%).

== Legal status ==
While onychectomy is banned in at least 38 countries, laws and policies governing it vary around the world. For example, many European countries prohibit or significantly restrict the practice, as do New Zealand, Japan, and Turkey. The list below gives an overview of the situation in different parts of the world.

=== Australia ===
In Australia, the practice of declawing is regulated at state level and there is a ban on the procedure in certain states, though not in New South Wales, where onychectomy is allowed in limited circumstance as an alternative to euthanasia. The Australian Veterinary Association's policy states: "Surgical alteration to the natural state of an animal is acceptable only if it is necessary for the health and welfare of the animal concerned. Performance of any surgical procedure for other than legitimate medical reasons is unacceptable."

=== Brazil ===
In Brazil, declawing is not allowed by the Federal Council of Veterinary Medicine.

=== Israel ===
In Israel, the Knesset Education Committee voted unanimously to send a bill banning the declawing of cats for non-medical reasons. The bill has passed second and third readings on 28 November 2011, effectively making declawing a criminal offense with penalty of one year in prison or a fine of 75,000 shekels.

=== Europe ===
In many European countries the practice is forbidden either under the terms of the European Convention for the Protection of Pet Animals or under local animal abuse laws, unless it is for "veterinary medical reasons or for the benefit of any particular animal". Some European countries go further, such as Finland, Sweden, Estonia, the Netherlands, Germany and Switzerland, where declawing cats for non-medical reasons is always illegal under their laws against cruelty to animals.

==== Austria ====
In Austria, the Federal Act on the Protection of Animals, in Section 7, states, surgical procedures "carried out for other than therapeutic or diagnostic purposes ... are prohibited, in particular ... declawing."

==== United Kingdom ====
In the United Kingdom, declawing was outlawed by the Animal Welfare Act 2006, which explicitly prohibited "interference with the sensitive tissues or bone structure of the animal, otherwise than for the purposes of its medical treatment." Even before the 2006 Act, however, declawing was extremely uncommon, to the extent that most people had never seen a declawed cat. The procedure was considered cruel by almost all British vets, who refused to perform it except on medical grounds. The Guide to Professional Conduct of the Royal College of Veterinary Surgeons stated that declawing was "only acceptable where, in the opinion of the veterinary surgeon, injury to the animal is likely to occur during normal activity. It is not acceptable if carried out for the convenience of the owner ... the removal of claws, particularly those which are weight bearing, to preclude damage to furnishings is not acceptable."

=== North America ===
In North America, declawing is commonly performed on cats to prevent damage to household possessions by scratching and to prevent scratching of people. Although no precise figures are available, a peer-reviewed veterinary journal articles from 2001 estimated that approximately 25% of domestic cats in North America had been declawed.

Some American and Canadian veterinarians endorse the procedure, while some have criticized and refused to perform it. In February 2020, Banfield, VCA, and BluePearl veterinary clinics announced that they would no longer offer elective declawing of cats. The decision applied to the over 2000 clinics in the US and Canada operated by Mars Veterinary Health, which employs over 10,000 veterinarians. Mars Veterinary Health is the largest owner of veterinary clinics in the United States and Canada. Dr. Jennifer Welser, Mars chief medical and quality officer, explained the decision in a statement: "At Mars Veterinary Health, we believe every pet deserves a safe, loving and supportive home that enables appropriate expression of natural behaviors. After careful consideration, medical leadership aligned on a new declaw position, and elective declaw surgery is no longer offered at U.S. Mars Veterinary Health practices."

Nonprofit advocacy organizations opposed to declawing exist throughout North America. One of the most prominent, The Paw Project, was started by Santa Monica, California-based veterinarian Jennifer Conrad. The group's stated mission is to educate the public on the adverse effects of feline declawing, to promote the abolition of the practice of declawing, and to provide care for cats that have been declawed. The group maintains a list of veterinary hospitals and clinics that will not offer declawing.

==== Canada ====
In Canada, the practice of feline onychectomy is banned in most provinces, with Ontario being the sole exception where elective declawing remains legally permitted. Provinces have implemented bans through their respective veterinary regulatory authorities, restricting the procedure to cases with genuine medical justification (e.g., severe injury or disease) rather than for convenience or behavioral management. The Canadian Veterinary Medical Association (CVMA) strongly opposes elective declawing, stating that it is an ethically unacceptable mutilation that inflicts unnecessary pain and long-term physical and psychological harm on cats. Despite this professional consensus, Ontario has yet to adopt similar restrictions, leaving the decision to individual veterinarians who are professionally discouraged from performing the procedure but not legally prohibited from doing so. Advocacy groups such as The Paw Project and organizations like Cleopawtra Veterinary Wellness are pushing for legislative reform in Ontario to align the province with the rest of Canada and global animal welfare standards. The push for a ban in Ontario continues, with growing public and professional support urging the province to follow the ethical standards set by the majority of Canada's veterinary community and provincial regulators.

All Canadian prohibitions still allow for declawing-type procedures in the case of medical necessity to treat an injury, deformity or pathology affecting the animal. That being said, these cases often only affect one digit, not all digits on all paws.

==== United States ====
Some privately owned apartment buildings in the U.S. ban cats unless they have been declawed. This is not the case in publicly subsidized housing, however, because in 2007 the U.S. Congress enacted legislation that forbids public housing authorities from having such rules. Laws have been passed in California (2012) and Rhode Island (2013) that ban landlords from requiring the declawing of cats as a condition of occupancy.

The U.S. Centers for Disease Control and Prevention does not recommend declawing as a method to prevent cat scratch disease, but that immunocompromised individuals, such as those with HIV infection, should avoid "rough play" with cats.

===== History of legal bans in the US =====
Declawing was outlawed in West Hollywood, California, in 2003, the first such ban in the U.S. The ordinance was authored by West Hollywood Councilmember John Duran and sponsored by The Paw Project. The California Veterinary Medical Association challenged the law in court. The CVMA maintained that West Hollywood had overstepped its municipal authority by enacting an ordinance that infringed on licensed professionals' state-granted rights. It did not directly address declawing as an animal welfare issue. The CVMA initially prevailed in Superior Court, but in June 2007, the California Court of Appeal overturned the lower court ruling, thus reinstating the law banning declawing in West Hollywood.

In 2004, California became the first state in the U.S. to enact a statewide ban on the declawing of wild and exotic cats. The bill was introduced by California Assemblymember Paul Koretz and sponsored by the Paw Project. In 2006, the United States Department of Agriculture enacted a ban on declawing of all wild and exotic animals held by USDA-licensed owners.

In April 2007, the city of Norfolk, Virginia, the city of the headquarters of PETA, initially outlawed declawing, but the law was amended immediately to prohibit declawing only by persons other than veterinarians (Municipal Code Sec. 6.1-78.1).

In 2009, the California state legislature approved a measure, sponsored by the California Veterinary Medical Association (CVMA), intended to stop other cities from passing bans similar to West Hollywood's. The bill included all professions licensed by the California Department of Consumer Affairs, and it was signed into law by the Governor in July 2009. However, the law's effective date, 1 January 2010, provided enough time for seven more California cities to pass Paw Project-sponsored local bans against the declawing of domestic cats: Los Angeles, San Francisco, Burbank, Santa Monica, Berkeley, Beverly Hills, and Culver City.

In 2012, a California bill, authored by Senator Fran Pavley and sponsored by the Paw Project, was signed into law that prohibits landlords from requiring declawing and devocalization of animals as a condition of tenancy. In 2013, the state of Rhode Island enacted a law, similar to the California law, prohibiting landlords from requiring declawing as a condition of occupancy.

Denver, Colorado, approved the first ban on declawing in a U.S. city outside California in November 2017. The effort was spearheaded by Aubrey Lavizzo, DVM, a veterinarian and Paw Project-Colorado Director. The ordinance was introduced by Denver City Councilmember Kendra Black.

On 22 July 2019, New York became the first state to ban declawing except if necessary to treat a medical condition in the cat. In 2022, Maryland became the 2nd US state to ban cat declawing. In 2024, Virginia enacted a similar ban. After Minnesota passed legislation in 2023 prohibiting landlords from requiring declawing and/or devocalization of pets as a condition of tenancy, in 2025 Minnesota legislators proposed a bill restricting elective declawing. Also in 2025, California banned declawing except for medical reasons, becoming the seventh state to do so. In 2026, the Washington State legislature is considering a bill to prohibit declawing.

==== Ethical viewpoints on declawing in the US ====
Declawing is widely practiced but ethically controversial within the American veterinary community. Two animal protection organizations in the U.S., the Humane Society of the United States and the American Society for the Prevention of Cruelty to Animals, discourage the procedure. The Humane Society of the United States has supported legislation banning or restricting declawing. Multiple surveys and polls taken from 2011 reveal that the majority of U.S. cat owners are against declawing, believing the practice to be cruel. These surveys also suggest that the U.S. public believes that the majority of veterinarians who perform declawings only do so because it is a lucrative practice.

Opposition to attempts to ban or restrict declawing has come from veterinary trade organizations, such as the California Veterinary Medical Association. On the other hand, the American Veterinary Medical Association states that declawing "should be considered only after attempts have been made to prevent the cat from using its claws destructively or when its clawing presents a zoonotic risk for its owner(s)." Surveys suggest that 95% of declaw surgeries are done to protect furniture.

== Alternatives to declawing ==
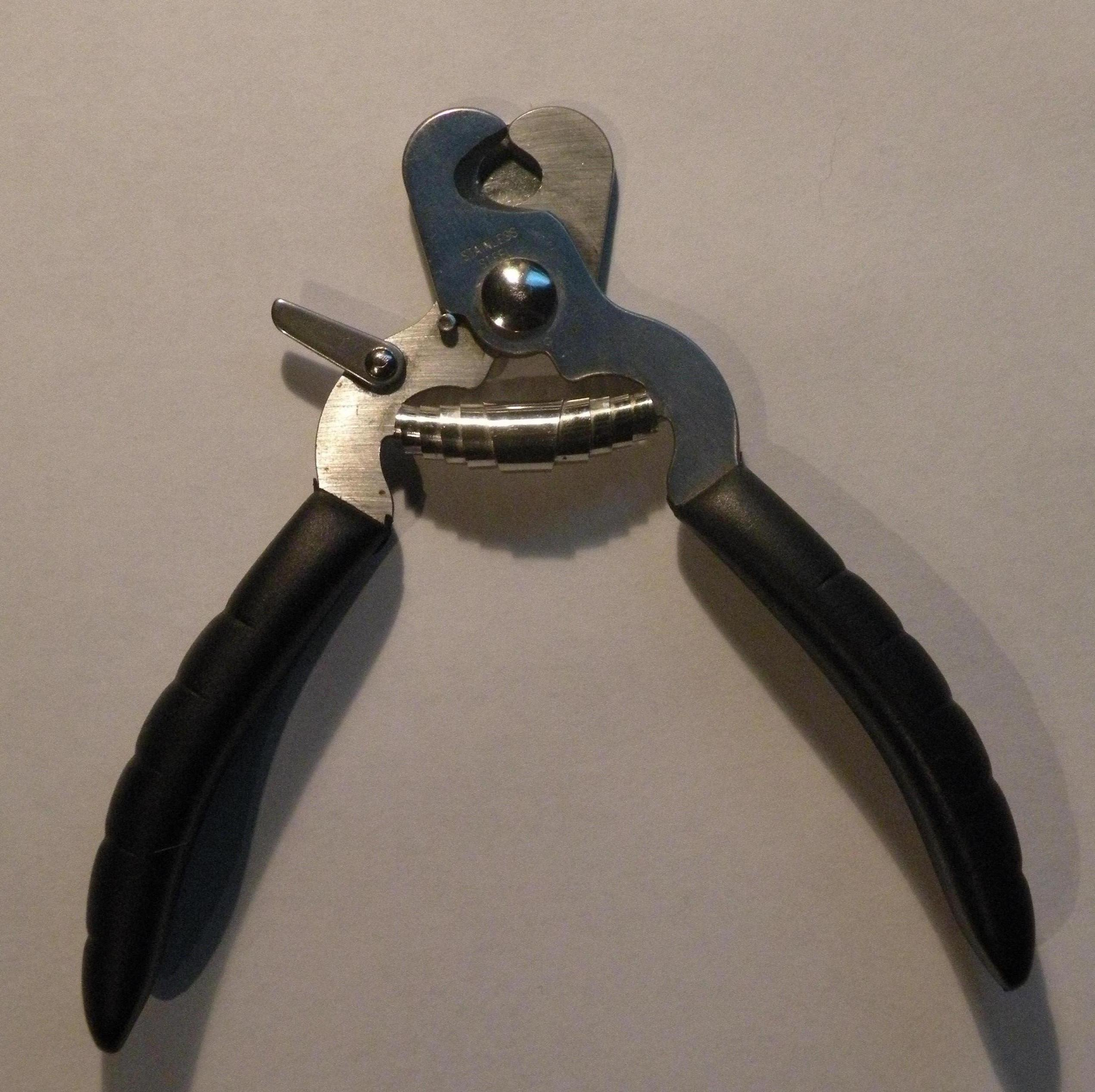
A claw cutter

=== Surgical ===
Tendonectomy involves cutting the deep digital flexor tendon of each claw, resulting in the cat being unable to move its distal phalanges. Without the ability to expose its claws, the cat is unable to wear down or groom its claws. For this reason, the cat subsequently requires regular nail clippings to prevent its claws from growing into its paw pads. A 1998 study published in the Journal of the American Veterinary Medical Association comparing cats undergoing onychectomy to cats undergoing tendonectomy found that, although the cats undergoing tendonectomy appeared to suffer less pain immediately post-operatively, there was no significant difference in postoperative lameness, bleeding, or infection between the two groups. A 2005 study found no evidence that tendonectomy is less painful than onychectomy. The American Veterinary Medical Association and the Canadian Veterinary Medical Association explicitly do not recommend this surgery as an alternative to declawing.

=== Non-surgical ===
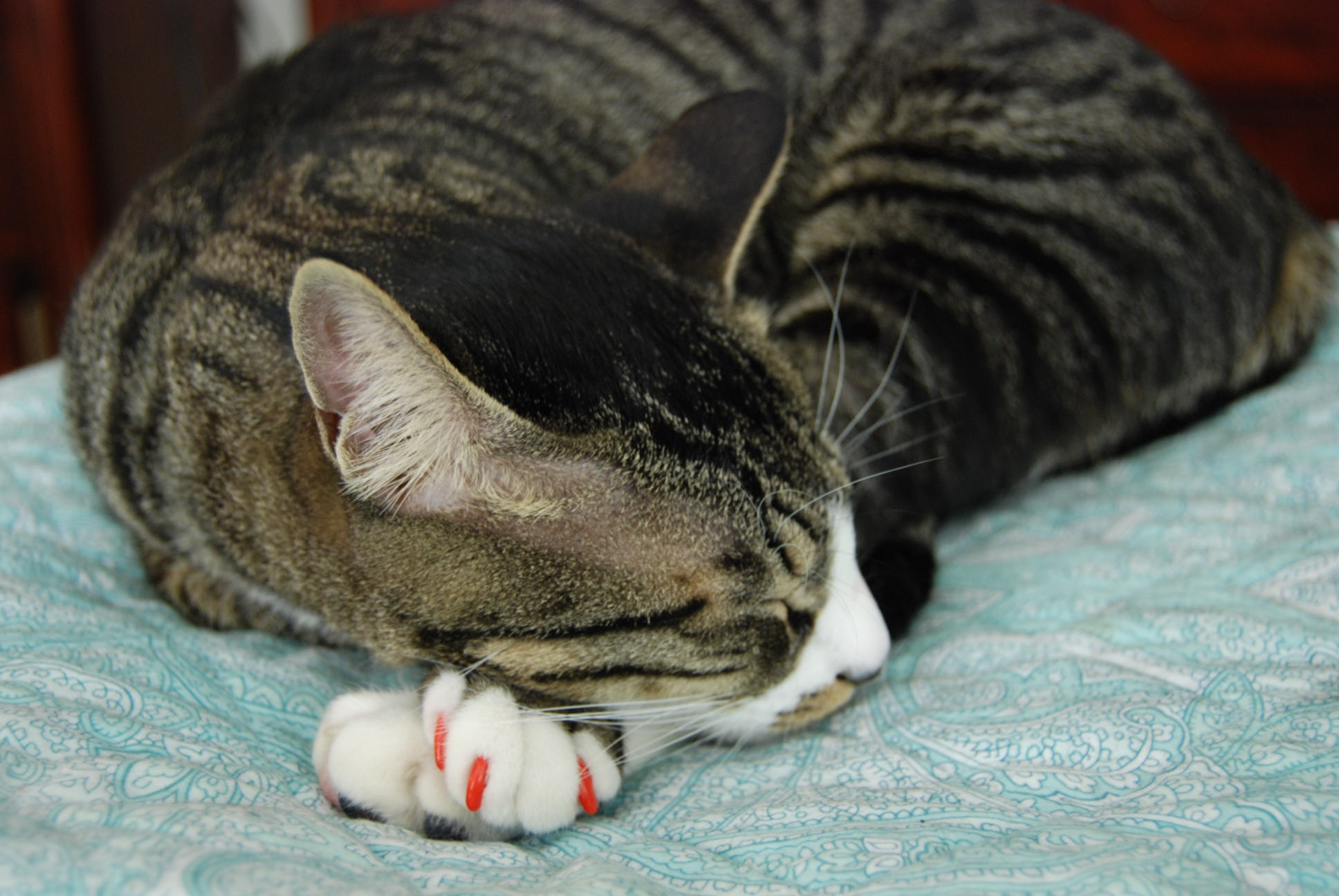
Cat with red nail caps

According to board-certified veterinary behaviorist Dr. Gary Landsberg, "For most cats, appropriate client advice and a little effort is all that is needed to prevent scratching problems." However, many veterinary practitioners are unwilling or unable to offer solutions to behavioral problems such as scratching, other than declawing.

A non-surgical alternative to declawing is the application of vinyl nail caps that are affixed to the claws with nontoxic glue, requiring periodic replacement when the cat sheds its claw sheaths (usually every four to six weeks, depending on the cat's scratching habits).

Cat getting his nails trimmed

Other alternatives include regular nail trimming; directing scratching behavior to inexpensive cardboard scratchers or scratching posts, or emery scratching pads that dull the claws; sanders or nail files; covering furniture to prevent damage, using double-sided sticky tape or sheets such as Sticky Paws; remote aversive devices such as Scat Mats; or acceptance of cats' scratching behavior.

== See also ==
- Overview of discretionary invasive procedures on animals
- Veterinary medicine
- The Paw Project (film)
- Veterinary ethics
