= Jamie Bamber =

British actor (born 1973)

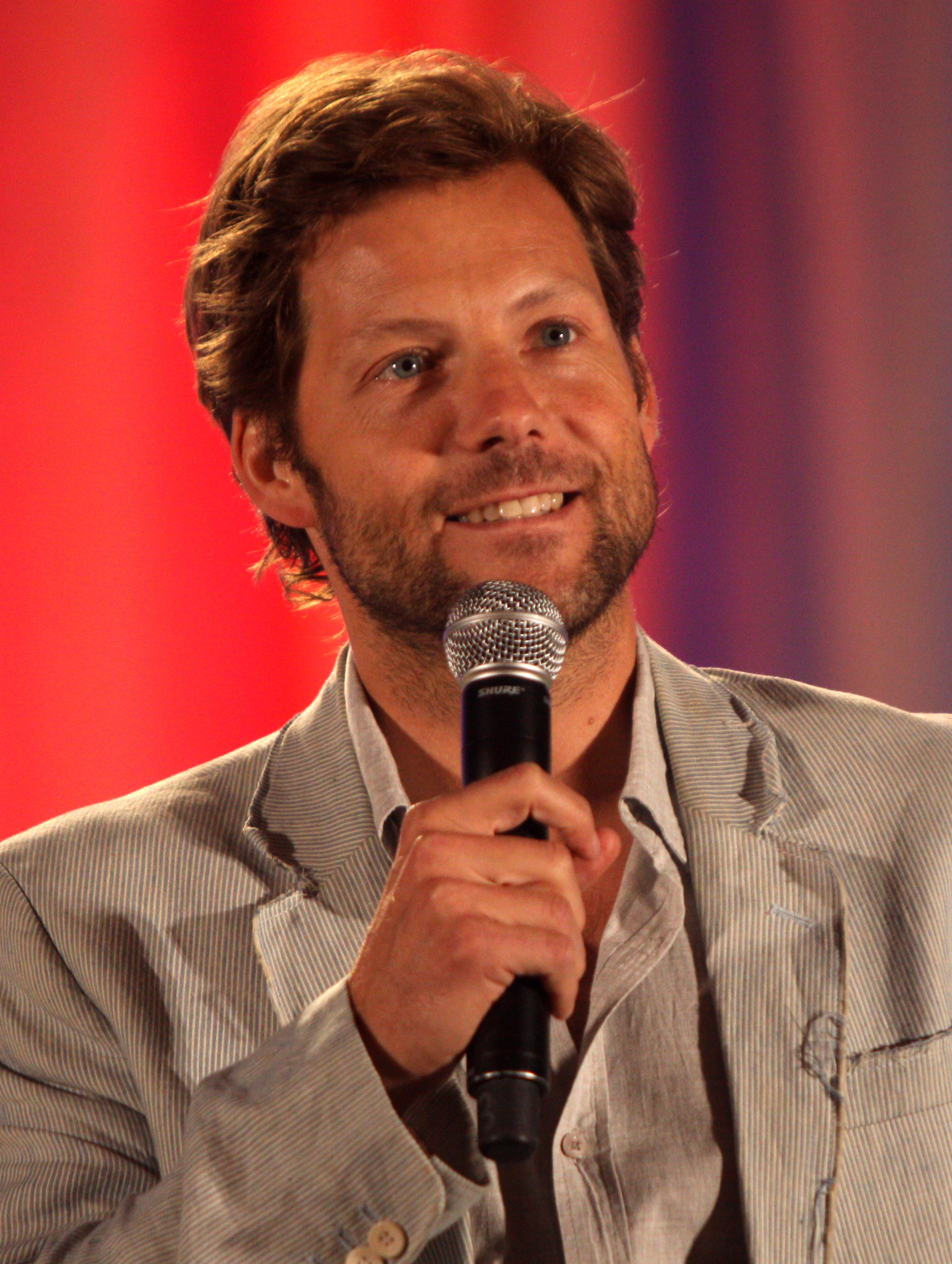
- Bamber at the Phoenix Comicon in May 2012
- Born: Jamie St John Bamber Griffith; 3 April 1973 (age 53); Hammersmith, London, England
- Education: St Paul's School; St John's College, Cambridge; London Academy of Music and Dramatic Art
- Occupation: Actor
- Years active: 1998–present
- Spouse: Kerry Norton
- Children: 3

Jamie St John Bamber Griffith (born 3 April 1973), known professionally as Jamie Bamber, is a British actor, known for his roles as Lee Adama in Battlestar Galactica and Detective Sergeant Matt Devlin in the ITV series Law & Order: UK. He also had a supporting role as 2nd Lt. Jack Foley in the HBO miniseries Band of Brothers, as Lieutenant Archie Kennedy in the Hornblower series and was a regular on the British series Ultimate Force and Peak Practice. In 2013, Bamber starred in the TNT medical drama Monday Mornings and, in 2014, in the Sky 1 drama The Smoke. In 2026, he joined the BBC soap opera EastEnders as Ned Hawkins.

== Early life and education ==
Jamie St John Bamber Griffith was born in Hammersmith, London, England, to Ralph and Elizabeth Griffith. His father is from the United States and his mother is from Northern Ireland. At the time Bamber was born, his father was a management consultant. Bamber has five brothers and one sister, actress Anastasia Griffith.

Bamber was educated at St Paul's School in London, and graduated with a first in modern languages (Italian and French) from St John's College, Cambridge, before attending and graduating from the London Academy of Music and Dramatic Art. He is fluent in both Italian and French, having spent part of his childhood in Paris.

Bamber appeared in the 1994 student film Shifting Sands.

== Career ==
=== Battlestar Galactica ===
Beginning in 2003, Bamber starred as Lee 'Apollo' Adama in the re-imagined Battlestar Galactica that started as a miniseries and served as a backdoor pilot for the 2004 television series on the US Sci Fi Channel (now Syfy). The show received critical acclaim and received a Peabody Award plus a number of nominations in its four-season run; Bamber was nominated for a Saturn Award for Best Supporting Actor on Television for Battlestar Galactica in 2004.

In the role of Lee Adama, Bamber speaks with an American accent which is frequently cited for its accuracy; he credits being exposed to his father's American accent from childhood. He also darkened his hair in an effort to more closely resemble Edward James Olmos, who plays his character's father. Reciprocally, Olmos wore contact lenses with blue irises to match Bamber's eyes.

Bamber wrote the foreword for Titan Books' Battlestar Galactica: The Official Companion Season Three by David Bassom. Of the show's dramatic resonance, he said:

... that's what good drama lets us do. It allows us to see and to feel things we otherwise would not. And great drama allows us to do that on every level: the psychological, the personal and the political. I am proud to say that in the pared down world of Battlestar Galactica, there is no plot, no character and no relationship that does not breathe the oxygen of all three levels at once.

=== Other television roles ===
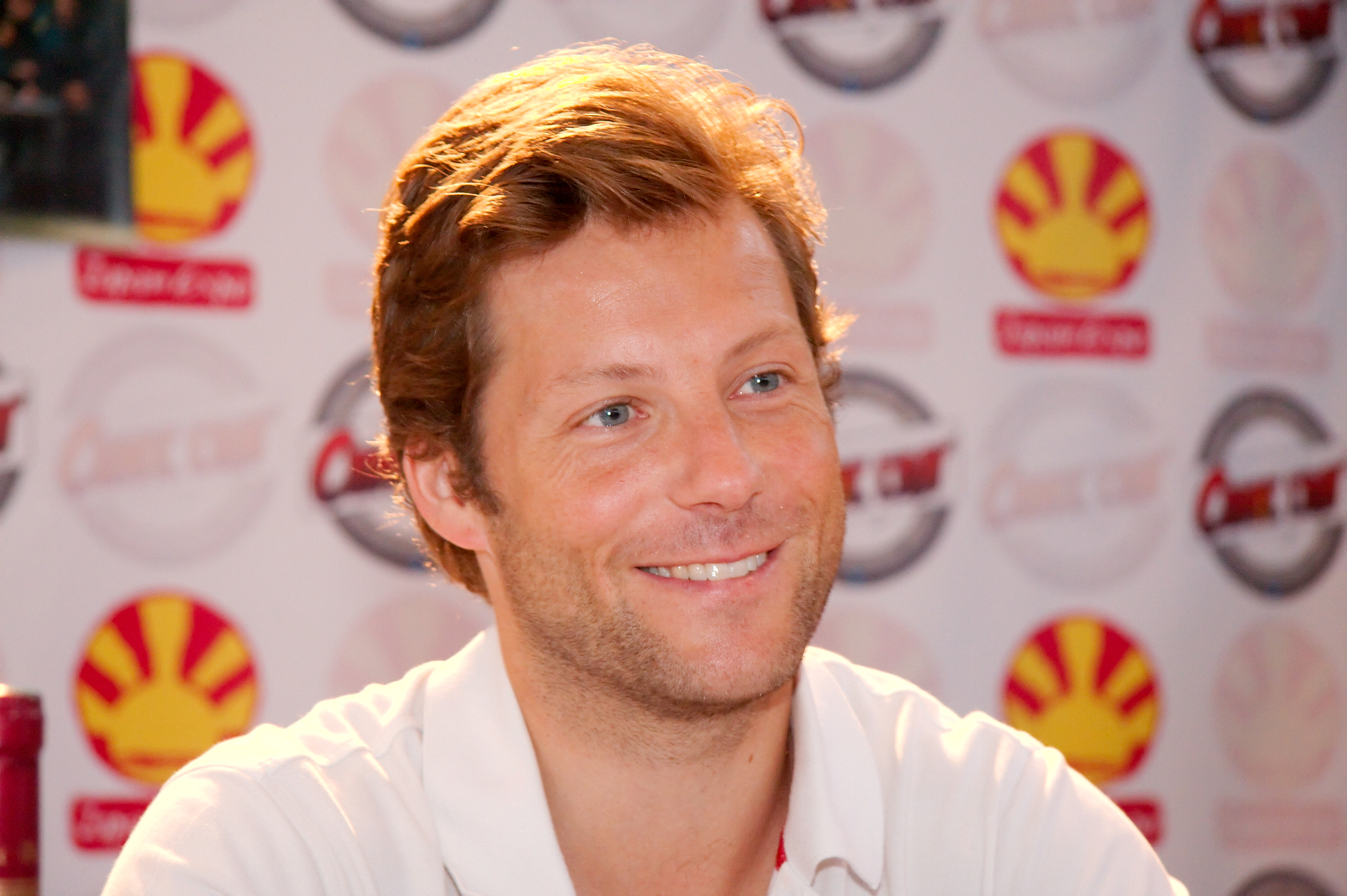
Bamber at Japan Expo in Paris in July 2009

Bamber is also well known for his role as DS Matt Devlin, the younger partner of veteran detective DS Ronnie Brooks (Bradley Walsh) on Law & Order: UK for the show's first five series, from 2009 to 2011.

He played Lieutenant Archibald "Archie" Kennedy in the ITV series Hornblower, appearing in five of the eight television films in which Kennedy (rising in ranks from midshipman to fourth lieutenant) has a much expanded role from that essayed in C.S. Forester's novels. Bamber also appeared as a trainee doctor in the final series of long running ITV soap Peak Practice, and portrayed an SAS officer in Ultimate Force; it was on a break from the latter, which he subsequently revealed was a job that he was not entirely happy with, that he traveled to Los Angeles and read for Battlestar Galactica.

Bamber guest starred in the second season premiere of Joss Whedon's Dollhouse where his character is wed to Echo (played by Eliza Dushku) during one of her missions; he also reunited with his Battlestar Galactica co-star Tahmoh Penikett in the episode. In the BBC's Outcasts, Bamber portrayed a hot-tempered expeditionary leader amongst colonists of a distant planet in the late 21st century; though he had been offered a larger part in the series, he elected to take the supporting role in part because he was wary of following up Battlestar Galactica with another sci-fi series that bore a few similarities. Other TV series in which he has made guest appearances include CSI: Miami, NCIS, House, Cold Case, Ghost Whisperer, The Last Detective, Body of Proof, Perception, Rizzoli & Isles, and the HBO miniseries Band of Brothers.

He played the role of detective Caolán Longstreet in 17th Precinct, a pilot by Galactica creator Ronald D. Moore described as a police drama which takes place in a world governed by magic. The pilot was not picked up by NBC for the fall 2011 season; it would have also re-united him with his Galactica co-stars James Callis and Tricia Helfer.

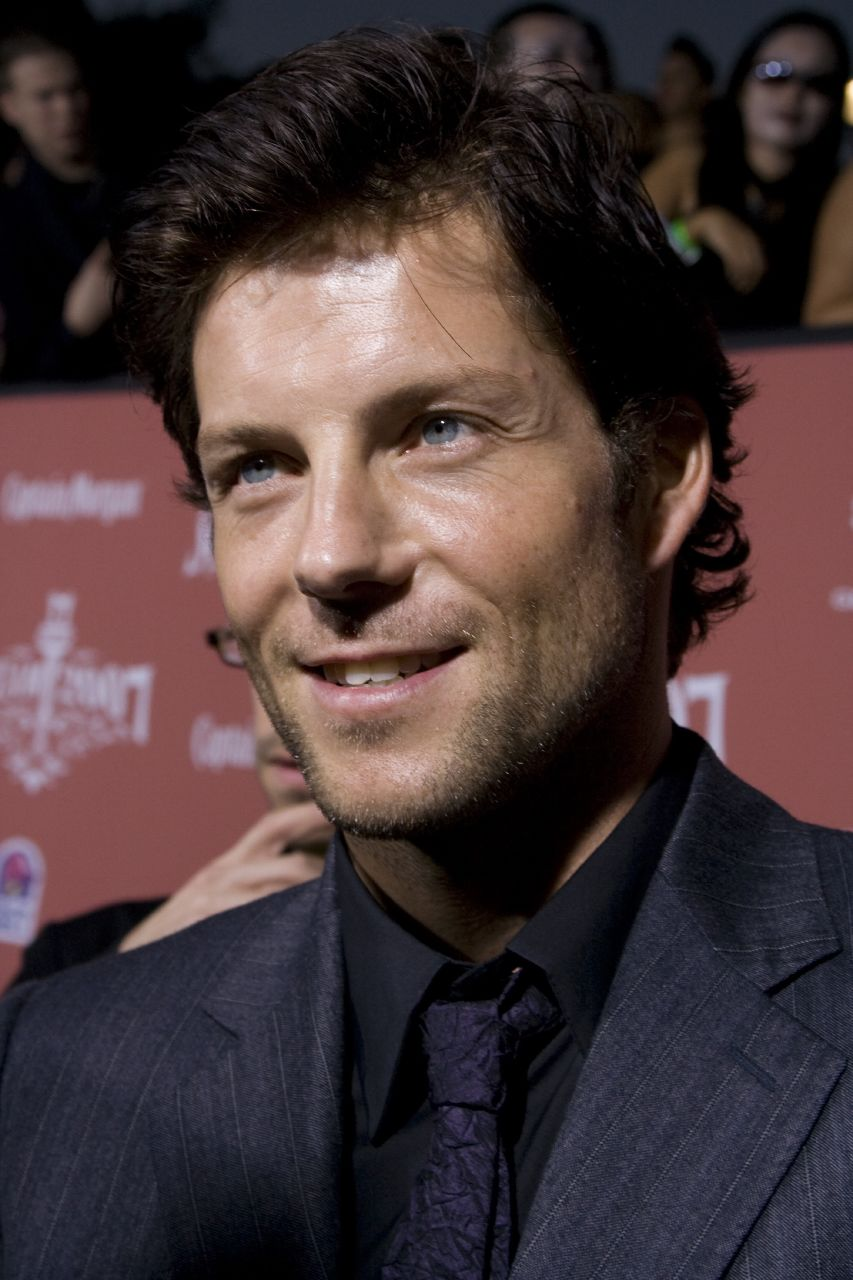
Bamber at the 2007 Scream Awards

Bamber starred as neurosurgeon Dr. Tyler Wilson in Monday Mornings, the David E. Kelley-produced series for TNT, co-executive-produced by Sanjay Gupta and based on his novel of the same name. The series debuted in February 2013; it was cancelled after one season. In 2014 he played the lead role of Kev Allison, a London firefighter struggling to keep his personal and professional relationships together after a life-altering accident on the job, in The Smoke, a Kudos Television drama for Sky1 in the UK.

He then had supporting roles in two UK series: Marcella, returning for a second series in 2018; and Fearless. He also played a recurring role in the 2018 STARZ series Counterpart and starred as Colonel Alexander Coltrane in the Cinemax series Strike Back. He played Archie Hughes, Martha's business partner and ex-fiance, in the BBC TV series Beyond Paradise, which started airing in 2023.

In July 2026, Bamber was announced to be joining the cast of the BBC soap opera EastEnders as Ned Hawkins, the husband of Gemma Hawkins (Patricia Potter), who is the sister of established character Nicola Mitchell (Laura Doddington), arriving alongside several other members of the Hawkins family.

=== Film ===
Bamber played the starring role in the 2008 film Pulse 2: Afterlife, a direct-to-DVD sequel to 2006's Pulse. Earlier he starred in The Devil's Tattoo (known as Ghost Rig in the US) along with Kerry Norton, who was later to become his wife.

He made his French-language acting debut in 2012 in Martin Valente's Un jour mon père viendra, portraying the American fiancé of the female lead played by French pop star Olivia Ruiz. According to Bamber, his character is loosely based on Andre Agassi. Most recently, he co-starred in the 2017 French romantic comedy L'Embarras du Choix alongside Alexandra Lamy and Arnaud Ducret.

In May 2011, Bamber completed filming John Doe: Vigilante, an Australian production directed by Kelly Dolen. The film was released in the United States on 21 March 2014.

On 9 June 2015, Variety announced that Jamie Bamber, Kellan Lutz, Jesse Williams, and Jess Weixler had joined the cast of a thriller film titled Money, directed by Martin Rosete and produced by Atit Shah.

=== Stage and radio ===
Bamber's stage appearances include Prince Hal in Henry IV Parts 1 and 2 at the Bristol Old Vic in 2002; and in 2005 he appeared as Mephistopheles in Dr. Faustus; at the Liverpool Playhouse.

He has also acted in radio serials; major roles include Sebastian Flyte in Brideshead Revisited and Philip in Where Angels Fear to Tread for BBC Radio 4.

== Personal life ==
Bamber is married to English actress and singer Kerry Norton, who played Ishay, Doc Cottle's assistant, on Battlestar Galactica. The couple have three daughters.

== Filmography ==
=== Film ===
Year	Title	Role	Notes
2003	The Devil's Tattoo	Tom	Released as Ghost Rig in the U.S.
2008	Pulse 2: Afterlife	Stephen	Direct-to-DVD
2012	Un jour mon père viendra	Stephen Astarti	English title: One Day My Dad Will Come
2012	Filly Brown	Sam	
2012	Tom and Jerry: Robin Hood and His Merry Mouse	Robin Hood (voice)	Direct-to-DVD
2013	Before I Sleep	Paul	
2014	John Doe: Vigilante	John Doe	
2015	The Better Half	Jeff Ryan	
2015	Numb	Will Evans	Also associate producer
2016	Money	John	
2016	A New York Christmas	Sam Martin	Original title: A Christmas in New York
2017	L'Embarras du choix	Paul	World-wide / English title: You Choose!
2018	Inferno: Skyscraper Escape	Tom Bronson	
2019	The Car: Road to Revenge	Caddok	
2020	Avernus	Jack	Short film
2022	Titanic 666	Professor Hal Cochran	
2022	The Lair	Major Roy Finch	
2024	Strangers	Sky	
TBA	Heavyweight	TBA	Completed

=== Television ===
Year	Title	Role	Notes
1998–2001	Hornblower	Midshipman/Acting Lt./Lt. Archie Kennedy	5 television films
1999	The Scarlet Pimpernel	Lord Tony Dewhurst	Series 1; episode 1: "The Scarlet Pimpernel"
2000	Agatha Christie's Poirot	Ralph Paton	Series 7; episode 1: "The Murder of Roger Ackroyd"
2000	Lady Audley's Secret	George Talboys	Television film
2001	Bob Martin	James	Series 2; episode 2: "Big Break"
2001	Band of Brothers	2nd Lt. Jack E. Foley	Miniseries; episodes 7–9
2001–2002	Peak Practice	Dr. Matt Kendal	Series 12; episodes 5–10, 12 & 13
2002	Daniel Deronda	Hans Meyrick	Miniseries; episodes 1–4
2002–2003	Ultimate Force	Lt. Dennis 'Dotsy' Doheny	Series 1 & 2; 8 episodes
2003	Battlestar Galactica	Cpt./Cmdr./Major Lee 'Apollo' Adama	Miniseries; episodes 1 & 2
2004–2009	Battlestar Galactica	Cpt./Cmdr./Major Lee 'Apollo' Adama	Main role; seasons 1–4; 74 episodes
2007	Battlestar Galactica: Razor	Cpt./Cmdr./Major Lee 'Apollo' Adama	Television film
2007	Cold Case	Jack Kimball	Season 4; episode 15: "Blood on the Tracks"
2007	Ghost Whisperer	Bryan Curtis	Season 2; episode 17: "The Walk-In"
2007	The Last Detective	Luke Clayhill	Series 4; episode 2: "Dangerous' Liaisons"
2009	Dollhouse	Martin Klar	Season 2; episode 1: "Vows"
2009–2011	Law & Order: UK	DS Matt Devlin	Main role; series 1–5; 32 episodes
2011	Outcasts	Mitchell Hoban	Episode 1
2011	CSI: Miami	Ronnie Hale	Season 10; episode 3: "Blown Away"
2011	House	Bob Harris	Season 8; episode 5: "The Confession"
2011	17th Precinct	Caolán Longstreet	Television film (unaired pilot)
2012	Body of Proof	Aiden Welles	Season 2; episodes 15–17
2012	Perception	Dr. Michael Hathaway	Season 1; episodes 2, 6 & 8: "Faces", "Lovesick" & "Kilimanjaro"
2013	Monday Mornings	Dr. Tyler Wilson	Main role; episodes 1–10
2014	The Smoke	Kev Allison	Main role; miniseries; episodes 1–8
2014–2015	Rizzoli & Isles	Paul Wescourt	Season 5; episodes 12 & 13: "Burden of Proof" & "Bridge of Tomorrow"
2014–2015	NCIS	NSA Attorney Jake Malloy	Season 12; episodes 9, 14 & 22, & season 13; episodes 9 & 11
2015	Major Crimes	Malcolm Rich	Season 4; episode 3: "Open Line"
2015	The Messengers	Vincent Plowman	Episodes 8, 10 & 11: "A House Divided", "Why We Fight" & "Harvest"
2016	Model Woman	Lio Fibonacci	Pilot episode
2016–2018	Marcella	DI/DCI Tim Williamson	Series 1 & 2; 14 episodes
2017	Fearless	Matthew Wild	Miniseries; episodes 2–6
2017	Counterpart	Eric Burton	Season 1; episode 1: "The Crossing"
2019–2020	Strike Back	Col. Alexander Coltrane	Series 7 & 8; 20 episodes
2021	Innocent	Sam Wright	Main role; series 2; episodes 1–4
2022	Signora Volpe	Adam Haines	Series 1; episodes 1 & 3: "An Anxious Aunt" & "Truffles & Treachery"
2022–2024	DI Ray	DCI Martyn Hunter	Series 1; episodes 1–4, & series 2; episode 3
2023	Treyder	Justin Lee	(unknown episodes)
2023	Cannes Confidential	Harry King	Main role; episodes 1–6
2023	Who Is Erin Carter?	DI Jim Armstrong	Miniseries; episodes 4 & 7
2023–present	Beyond Paradise	Archie Hughes	Series 1; episodes 2–6, series 3; episodes 1–3 & series 4; episode 2
2024	The Wives	Charlie Morgan	Episodes 1–6
2026–present	EastEnders	Ned Hawkins	Regular role

=== Web ===
Year	Title	Role	Notes
2013	Star Trek Continues	Mr. Simone	Episode 1: "Pilgrim of Eternity"

=== Video games ===
Year	Title	Role
2011	Star Wars: The Old Republic	Ffon Althe / Sergeant Garus (voice)
2013	Grand Theft Auto V	The Local Population (voice)
2013	Dead Rising 3	Simon Merkin (voice)
