= Caroline Silhol =

French actress (born 1949)

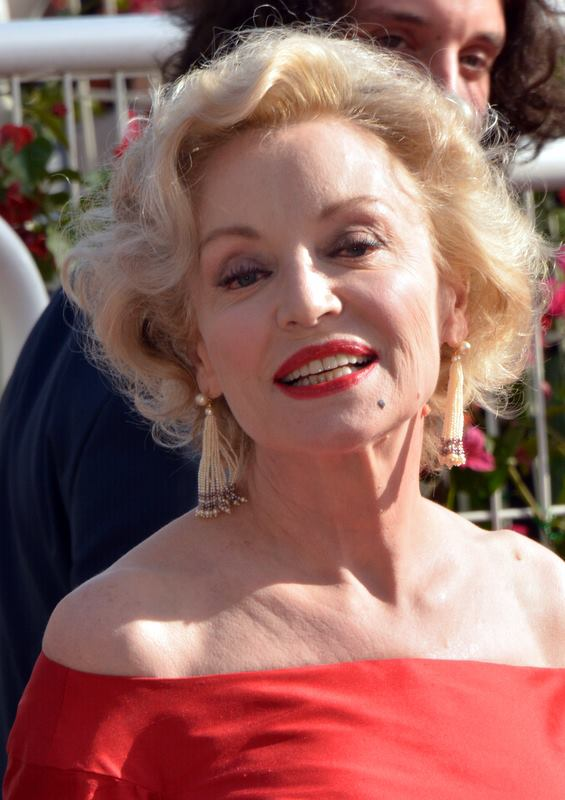
- Silhol in 2017
- Born: 10 August 1949 (age 77); Paris, France
- Occupation: Actress
- Years active: 1972–present
- Spouse: Jean-Louis Livi

Caroline Silhol (born 10 August 1949) is a French actress and writer. She is a three-time Molière Award-nominee for her theatre performances.

== Life and career ==
Silhol was born in Paris and began her acting career in early 1970s appearing in film and television playing supporting roles though the next two decades working with directors including François Truffaut, Nelly Kaplan and Alain Corneau. On stage, Silhol performed in productions of Le Paysan parvenu, Tartuffe, Les Parents terribles, Sodom and Gomorrah, Chantecler, The Infernal Machine and others. She received three Molière Award for Best Actress nominations: in 1994, 2002 and 2005.

Silhol received international recognition after appearances in films Tous les Matins du Monde (1991), Vent d'est (1993), Prediction (1993) and Rembrandt (1999). She wrote and starred in the 2000 drama film Half of Heaven and played Marlene Dietrich in the 2007 musical film La Vie en Rose. Silhol played the female lead in the 2019 romantic comedy film Remember Me opposite Bruce Dern.

Silhol married French film producer Jean-Louis Livi, nephew of actor Yves Montand.

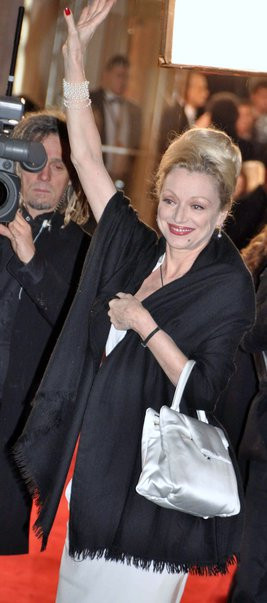
Silhol at the 2010 César Awards

== Filmography ==
- Au théâtre ce soir (4 episodes, 1972–1977)
- L'ombre d'une chance (1974) as Blanche
- L'Ibis rouge (1975) as La domestique
- Bonjour Paris (1976)
- Un amour de sable (1977) as Véronique
- Histoires insolites (1 episode, 1979) as Jenny
- Le roi qui vient du sud (miniseries, 1979) as Antoinette
- BBC2 Playhouse (1 episode, 1980) as Laura
- Les amours des années folles (1 episode, 1980) as Angèle
- Les amours du mal-aimé (1980) as Lou
- Les Grands Ducs (1982) as Hélène
- La tribu des vieux enfants (1982) as Thérèse
- Smiley's People (1 episode, 1982) as Marie-Claire Guillam
- Le démon dans l'île (1983) as Hélène Cayrade
- Life Is a Bed of Roses (1983)
- Vivement dimanche! (1983) as Marie-Christine Vercel
- Les Morfalous (1984) as Mme Chanterelle
- Le mystérieux docteur Cornélius (miniseries, 1984) as Isadora Jorgell
- La bavure (miniseries, 1984) as Vicky
- La politique est un métier (1985) as Caroline
- Néo Polar (1 episode, 1985) as Sonia Carton
- Visa pour nulle part (1985) as Ève Courvoisier
- Cinéma 16 (1 episode, 1986) as Nicole
- Tenue de soirée (1986) as Wife of the Rich and Depressed Man
- Marie Love (1986) as Annick
- L'heure Simenon (1 episode, 1987) as Béatrice
- Pattes de velours (1987) as Iris
- Vaines recherches (1987) as Muriel
- Le chevalier de Pardaillan (1988) as Mme de Montpensier
- Sueurs froides(1 episode, 1988) as Jacqueline Varlon
- Contrainte par corps (1988) as Émilie
- L'excès contraire (1988) as Adele
- Les Cinq Dernières Minutes (4 episodes, 1984–1988) as Commissaire Belmont
- I Want to Go Home (1989) as Dora Dempsey
- Sentiments (1 episode, 1990) as Marjorie
- La seconde (1990) as Jane
- Faux et usage de faux (1990) as Jacqueline Ségur
- L'enfant des loups (1991) as Agnes
- Tous les Matins du Monde (1991) as Mme. de Sainte Colombe
- Police Secrets (1 episode, 1992) as Françoise
- Vent d'est (1993) as Countess Irène Smyslovsky
- L'interdiction (1993) as La marquise d'Espard
- Prediction (1993) as Oksana
- La lumière des étoiles mortes (1994) as Magdeleine
- L'amour conjugal (1995) as Marthe de Lairac
- J'ai deux amours (1996) as Sophie
- L'enfant du secret (1996) as Blanche
- Droit dans le mur (1997) as Elisa
- Passion interdite (1998) as Nelly
- Rembrandt (1999) as Maria Tesselschade
- Maigret (1 episode, 2000) as Madame Parendon
- Half of Heaven (2000) as Anne Laugel, also screenwriter
- The Overeater (2003) as Anne Lachaume
- Bel ami (2005) as Mme Walter
- Les Amants du Flore (2006) as Françoise de Beauvoir
- La Vie en Rose (2007) as Marlene Dietrich
- A Girl Cut in Two (2007) as Geneviève Gaudens
- Love Life (2007) as Josephine
- A Man and His Dog (2008)
- Making Plans for Lena (2009) as La fleuriste
- La bonté des femmes (2011) as Helene
- La mauvaise rencontre (2011) as La mère de Loup
- La danse de l'albatros (2012) as Françoise
- Life of Riley (2014) as Tamara
- Les trois silences (2014) as Olivia
- Sur quel pied danser (2016)
- Monsieur je-sais-tout (2018) as Françoise Barteau
- Remember Me (2019) as Lilian
- Monsieur Spade (2024)
