= Jesse Williams (actor) =

American actor, director, producer (born 1980)

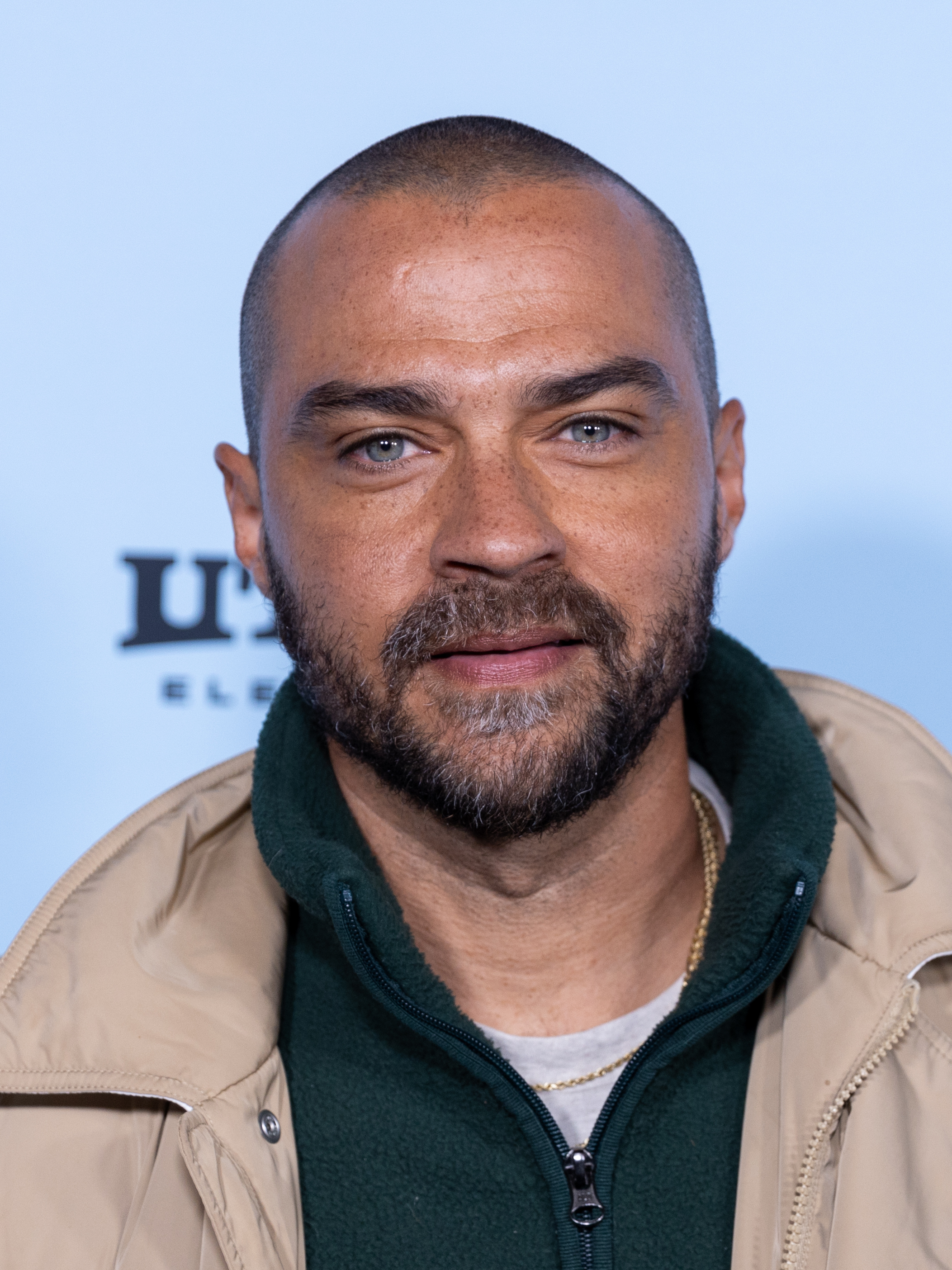
- Williams in 2025
- Born: Jesse Wesley Williams; August 5, 1981 (age 45); Chicago, Illinois, U.S.
- Education: Temple University
- Occupations: Actor; director; producer; activist
- Years active: 2006–present
- Spouse: Aryn Drake-Lee (m. 2012; div. 2020) Alejandra Onieva (m. 2026)
- Children: 3

Jesse Wesley Williams (born August 5, 1981) is an American actor, director, producer, and activist best known as Dr. Jackson Avery on Grey's Anatomy (2009–22; 2024–25). He has also appeared in films such as The Cabin in the Woods (2011) and The Butler (2013). He provided voice acting and motion capture for Markus in the video game Detroit: Become Human (2018).

He served as an executive producer of the Academy Award–winning short Two Distant Strangers (2020) and the Tony Award–winning revival of Take Me Out (2022). He also acted in the latter and was nominated for a Tony Award for Best Featured Actor in a Play.

== Early life ==
Williams was born in Chicago on August 5, 1981, to Johanna Chase, a professional potter, and Reginald Williams. Jesse Williams has said his mother has Swedish and Polish ancestry, and his father is African American from Georgia.

Finding Your Roots revealed that on his mother's side, Williams is a descendant of English colonist Joseph Herrick, the principal law enforcement officer during the Salem Witch Trials in Massachusetts.

Williams graduated from Moses Brown School in Providence, Rhode Island, in 1998. After he graduated from high school, his father began teaching history in northern Maine, while his mother continued to work in pottery. He has two younger brothers, who both specialize and work in the field of visual arts.

Williams graduated from Temple University with a double major in African American Studies and Film and Media Arts. Following in the footsteps of his parents, he began teaching American Studies, African Studies and English in the Philadelphia public school system for six years.

== Acting career ==
In 2005, Williams began to study acting and was chosen to participate in the New York Actors Showcase presented by ABC Television, one of 14 actors chosen from among more than 800 individuals who auditioned. Since 2006, he has appeared in a number of television series, films and theatre productions. In 2012, he established a production company, farWord Inc.

In 2006, Williams appeared in an episode of Law & Order, portraying the character Kwame. He also appeared in the role of Drew Collins, in two episodes of the ABC Family series Greek.

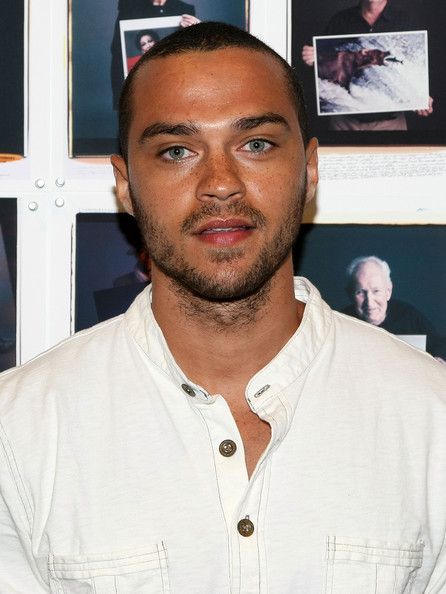
Williams in 2008

On October 15, 2009, Williams began appearing as surgical resident Jackson Avery, in the ABC television series Grey's Anatomy. On June 8, 2010, it was announced Williams would be a series regular, starting in season 7. He worked with the series for 12 seasons, and his departure was announced in May 2021. His final episode aired May 20 on ABC. In an interview with The Hollywood Reporter in May 2021, Williams said the decision to leave the show was "a collective thing" and part of a discussion the actor had with showrunner Krista Vernoff about Jackson's trajectory that ultimately helped solidify 11 seasons of storyline. In May and October 2022 and September 2024, he returned in guest appearances in seasons 18–19 and 21.

Williams was named the TV Actor of the Year at the 2011 Young Hollywood Awards. BuddyTV ranked him as No. 6 on its "TV's 100 Sexiest Men of 2010" list and No. 11 in 2011.

Williams made his film debut in the supporting role of Leo in the 2008 sequel to The Sisterhood of the Traveling Pants. He subsequently appeared in Brooklyn's Finest (2009), starring Don Cheadle, Richard Gere, Ethan Hawke, Wesley Snipes, and Ellen Barkin. Williams played Holden McCrea, the lead role in the MGM/United Artists horror film The Cabin in the Woods, produced by Joss Whedon and directed by Drew Goddard, released April 13, 2012.

In May 2012, a fan campaign was organized to try to influence film executives to cast him in the role of Finnick Odair in The Hunger Games: Catching Fire. This news resulted in some Hunger Games fans protesting casting decisions made by the film executives.

In 2013, Williams wrote an opinion piece for CNN which analyzed the film Django Unchained. Later that year he narrated the audio version of the book The Bane Chronicles: What Really Happened In Peru, by Cassandra Clare and Sarah Rees Brennan.

On June 9, 2015, Variety announced Williams was among actors who had joined the cast of the thriller film, Money, who included Jamie Bamber, Kellan Lutz, Jesse Williams, and Jess Weixler. The film was directed by Martin Rosete and produced by Atit Shah.

In May 2016, Williams was executive producer of the documentary film Stay Woke: The Black Lives Matter Movement, part of BET's 'The Truth Series'. In 2021, Williams produced an American short-film titled Two Distant Strangers, written by Travon Free and Martin Desmond Roe. This short film won an Academy Award for Best Live Action Short Film in 2021.

Williams has served as a guest director for student productions at the Urban Arts Partnership 24 Hour Plays Off-Broadway, at the request of Rosie Perez and Anna Strout.

In March 2022, Williams made his Broadway debut in the revival of Richard Greenberg’s Take Me Out. Williams starred in the lead role of Darren Lemming. He was nominated for a Tony Award for Best Featured Actor in a Play.

Williams had a recurring role on Hulu's Only Murders in the Building in fall 2023, playing Tobert. Together with the rest of the cast, Williams was nominated for the Screen Actors Guild Award for Outstanding Performance by an Ensemble in a Comedy Series in 2024.

== Activism ==
Williams is the youngest member of the board of directors at The Advancement Project, a civil rights think tank and advocacy group. He is also the executive producer of Question Bridge: Black Males, a multifaceted media project, art exhibition, student and teacher curriculum and website, focused on the black male identity and the diversity within the demographic.

He has written articles for CNN and The Huffington Post. He also has been a guest on Wolf Blitzer's The Situation Room.

In June 2016, Williams won the humanitarian award at the 2016 BET Awards. His acceptance speech highlighted issues of racial injustice, police brutality, and the 'invention of whiteness'. As a result of his speech, dueling petitions were circulated: one to have Williams fired from Grey's Anatomy and one to keep him on the series.

== Other work ==
Williams occasionally worked as a model during college, but never considered pursuing it as a career. He modeled for Kenneth Cole Productions, Levi's, and Tommy Hilfiger Corporation. Williams also modeled for Lane Bryant in 2012.

He appeared as the love interest of R&B singer Rihanna in the music video for her single "Russian Roulette" from her 2009 album Rated R. He also appears in the music video for Estelle's song "Fall In Love", from the album All of Me. In 2018, Williams appeared in the video for "Tell Me You Love Me" by Demi Lovato.

Williams did the voice acting and performance capture for Markus in the video game Detroit: Become Human, which first released on May 25, 2018, for the PlayStation 4. He also did the voice acting and performance capture for Duke in the video game NBA 2K21, which released worldwide on September 4, 2020, for multiple consoles.

== Personal life ==
Williams dated Aryn Drake-Lee for five years before the two married on September 1, 2012. The couple have two children together, a daughter Sadie Williams (b. December 2013) and a son Maceo Williams (b. October 2015). The couple filed for divorce in April 2017. The divorce was finalized in October 2020.

In 2026, Williams married his Hotel Costiera co-star, Alejandra Onieva. In May 2026, it was reported that the couple were expecting their first child together. Their first child was born on 14 September 2026, in Los Angeles.

== Filmography ==
=== Film ===
Year	Title	Role	Notes
2008	The Sisterhood of the Traveling Pants 2	Leo	
2009	Brooklyn's Finest	Eddie Quinlain	
2010	Dirty Dancing 3: Capoeira Nights	Johnny	Short film
2011	The Cabin in the Woods	Holden McCrea	
2012	Question Bridge: Black Males	—N/a	Executive producer
2013	The Butler	James Lawson	
2013	Snake and Mongoose	Don "The Snake" Prudhomme	Also executive producer
2013	They Die by Dawn	John Taylor	
2016	Money	Sean	
2017	Band Aid	Skyler	
2019	Selah and the Spades	The Headmaster	
2019	Jacob's Ladder	Isaac "Ike" Singer	
2019	Random Acts of Violence	Todd Walkley	Also executive producer
2020	Two Distant Strangers	—N/a	Short film Executive producer
2022	Secret Headquarters	Sean Irons	
2023	Your Place or Mine	Theo	
2025	What We Hide	Sheriff Jeffries	
TBA	The Decline of Fucking Western Civilization		Filming

=== Television ===
Year	Title	Role	Notes
2006	Law & Order	Kwame	Episode: "America, Inc."
2006	Beyond the Break	Eric Medina	8 episodes
2008	Greek	Drew "The Hotness Monster" Collins	2 episodes
2009–2022, 2024–2025	Grey's Anatomy	Dr. Jackson Avery	Recurring (Season 6), Main (Seasons 7–17), Guest star (Seasons 18–19, 21–22)
2010	Seattle Grace: Message of Hope	Dr. Jackson Avery	6 episodes
2013	Sesame Street	Himself	Episode: "4409"
2015	The Spoils Before Dying	Parker	Episode: "The Trip Trap"
2016	The Eric Andre Show	Himself	Episode: "Jesse Williams; Jillian Michaels"
2018	Most Expensivest	Himself	Episode: "Lights Camera Action"
2019	Power	Kadeem	Episode: "Scorched Earth"
2020	Little Fires Everywhere	Joe Ryan	3 episodes
2020	Station 19	Dr. Jackson Avery	7 episodes Recurring role (season 3)
2021	A Black Lady Sketch Show	Isaac	Episode: "Sister, May I Call You Oshun?"
2021	Saturday Night Live	Jesse W.	Uncredited; Episode: "Kim Kardashian West/Halsey"
2022	Inside Amy Schumer	Josh	Episode: "Fart Park"
2023	Only Murders in the Building	Tobert	Recurring role (Season 3)
2024	The Great Lillian Hall	David	Television film
2025	Hotel Costiera	Daniel "DD" De Luca	Main role; also executive producer
2026	Shifting Gears	Andy	4 episodes
2027	The Morning Show	Vernon	Season 5

=== Music videos ===
Year	Title	Artist(s)
2006	"When Your Heart Stops Beating"	+44
2009	"Russian Roulette"	Rihanna
2010	"Fall in Love"	Estelle
2017	"Tell Me You Love Me"	Demi Lovato
2017	"Legacy"	Jay-Z

=== Video games ===
Year	Title	Role	Notes
2018	Detroit: Become Human	Markus	Also motion capture
2020	NBA 2K21	Duke	Also motion capture

=== Stage ===
Year	Title	Role	Notes
2022–2023	Take Me Out	Darren Lemming	Hayes Theater; Gerald Schoenfeld Theatre

=== Audio ===
Year	Title	Role	Notes
2023	The Misty Door	Solstice Starr	Main role
