= Remember Me (2019 film) =

- Film poster
- Directed by: Martin Rosete
- Written by: Martin Rosete; Rafa Russo
- Story by: Rafa Russo
- Produced by: Martin Rosete; Atit Shah
- Starring: Bruce Dern; Caroline Silhol; Brian Cox
- Cinematography: Jose Martín Rosete
- Edited by: Beatriz Colomar
- Music by: Pascal Gaigne
- Production companies: Create Entertainment; Lazona Films; Kamel Films; F Comme Film
- Distributed by: Filmax (Spain); Universal Pictures (International)
- Release date: August 2, 2019 (Spain)
- Running time: 88 minutes
- Countries: Spain; United States; France
- Language: English
- Box office: $122,062

Remember Me is a 2019 romantic comedy film directed by Martin Rosete, and starring Bruce Dern, Caroline Silhol and Brian Cox. The screenplay, written by Rafa Russo, was included in Franklin Leonard's Black List.

Initiating principal photography from August 24, 2018, in Madrid, Spain, Remember Me marks the second feature film of Martin Rosete and Atit Shah as partners.

The film was released internationally on May 5, 2020, by Universal Pictures and was released in the United States in July.

== Cast ==
- Bruce Dern as Claude
- Brian Cox as Shane
- Caroline Silhol as Lilian
- Brandon Larracuente
- Sienna Guillory as Selma

== Production ==
Producer Atit Shah and his company Create Entertainment handled development, packaging, and production of the film in cooperation with Rosete's company Kamel Films based in Madrid, Spain.

=== Casting ===
On August 7, 2018, Variety announced that Bruce Dern, Brian Cox and Caroline Silhol had joined the cast.

Soon after The Hollywood Reporter announced had Sienna Guillory and Brandon Larracuente had joined the cast.

=== Filming ===
Principal photography began in Madrid, Spain, on August 24, 2017 over a period of 30 days.
