= Martin Rosete =

Spanish film and commercial director (born 1980)

- Born: 1980 (age 45–46); Madrid, Spain
- Occupation: Film director

Juan Pablo Martín Rosete is a Spanish film and commercial director. In 2016, Rosete released his feature film directorial debut, Money, an American thriller that starred Jamie Bamber and Jesse Williams.

Rosete was born in Madrid in 1980. He studied audiovisual communication at the Complutense University in Madrid and directing at the Escuela Internacional de Cine y Televisión de San Antonio de los Baños in Cuba. In 2002 Rosete wrote, directed, and produced his first short film, Revolución, which is based on a short story by Slawomir Mrozek. It won more than 50 prizes internationally and Martin managed to obtain distribution contracts with Canal+ Spain, Canal+ International, TVE International and FNAC. Rosete went on to direct and produce several more short films while also producing various advertisements and corporate videos. In 2011 Rosete directed Voice Over, which starred Jonathan D. Mellor. It was nominated for a 2013 Goya Award and received the Melies d’Or award for Best European Fantastic Short Film.

== Select filmography ==
=== Short film ===
- Revolución (2002, as director and producer)
- Our Daily Bread (2005, as director)
- Paper or Plastic (2008, as director)
- One Man Band (2009, as co-director and producer)
- Basket Bronx (2009, as director and producer)
- I Wish (2010, as director and producer)
- Voice Over (2011, as director and producer)
- Mexican Cuisine (2011, as producer)
- El descenso (2011, as producer)
- Don't Look There (2013, as producer)
- Walkie Buddies (2013, as director)

=== Feature length films ===
- Money (2016, as director and producer)
- Remember Me (2019, as director and producer)
