= Tendonectomy =

Surgical cutting of tendons

Tendonectomy is the surgical cutting of tendons, and is generally only practiced in veterinary medicine.

== In cats ==
Performing a tendonectomy on a cat is an alternative to onychectomy ("declawing"), which amputates the end of each digit. Tendonectomy may be considered less painful for the cat than onychectomy; however, it is not recommended by the American Veterinary Medical Association (AVMA) and is illegal in many countries.

In a tendonectomy, a small portion of the tendon in each of a cat's toes is surgically removed to prevent the cat from extending the claws. Thus, the cat is no longer capable of scratching.

Claws will continue to grow following tendonectomy, and because the cat can no longer extend the claws to scratch, the cat will not wear down the claws as before. Therefore, among other considerations, the cat owner should evaluate the ongoing maintenance required in the form of regular claw trimming thereafter when considering this procedure.

In terms of studies on the impact of onychectomy versus tendonectomy, the American Veterinary Medical Association compared the outcomes of the two operations in its August 1, 1998 issue. Their report considered owner satisfaction and drawbacks such as pain and future complications. Cats who underwent tendonectomy displayed significantly lower pain immediately following the procedure versus those who underwent onychectomy. However, both procedures showed an equal frequency of other complications, such as bleeding, lameness, and infection. Cats took the same number of days to recover from both operations (as measured by normalcy in walking), and owners were equally satisfied with both options.

One complication to watch out for later on in the cat's life with a tendonectomy is the nails getting brittle. Nails that are more brittle are prone to splitting and shattering when trimmed by the owner, which is quite painful for the cat.
