= Jay Rabinowitz (film editor) =

American Film and commercial editor

Jay Rabinowitz is an American film editor and commercial editor. He is certified by the American Cinema Editors.

Rabinowitz studied at New York University, where he graduated in 1984 with a Bachelor of Fine Arts degree from the undergraduate Cinema Studies program. During the program he learned of a film in pre-production that needed an intern, which turned out to be Jim Jarmusch's Down by Law (1986). He is credited as the assistant editor for several films in the next years, including Jarmusch's Mystery Train (1989-edited by Melody London).

Starting with Night on Earth (1991), Rabinowitz has been the editor for seven of Jarmusch's films: Dead Man (1995), Year of the Horse (1997), Ghost Dog: The Way of the Samurai (1999), Coffee and Cigarettes (2003), Broken Flowers (2005), and The Limits of Control (2009). Rabinowitz was nominated for an "Eddie" award of the American Cinema Editors for Year of the Horse (Best Edited Documentary Film category).

His other credits as film editor include Mark Webber's directorial debut Explicit Ills; Todd Haynes' I'm Not There; Frank Oz' The Stepford Wives; Adam Bhala Lough's Bomb the System (for which he was honored with the Best Editing award at the Milan Film Festival) and Weapons; and Curtis Hanson's Academy Award-winning 8 Mile.

Rabinowitz' editing for Darren Aronofsky's Requiem for a Dream (2000) won best editing awards from the Phoenix Film Critics Society and from the Online Film Critics Society. The film was listed as the 29th best-edited film of all time in a 2012 survey of members of the Motion Picture Editors Guild. He was nominated for the Online Film Critics' award for Aronofsky's The Fountain (2006).

He also functioned as music editor on Explicit Ills; Bomb the System; Weapons; Big Bad Love; Requiem for a Dream; When Pigs Fly; and Jarmusch's Broken Flowers, Coffee and Cigarettes, and Ghost Dog: The Way of the Samurai.

For Barry Levinson and Tom Fontana, he edited numerous episodes of the television series Oz and Homicide: Life on the Street. Rabinowitz worked with legendary photographer Robert Frank on the latter's film Last Supper.

In the year 2000 Rabinowitz was awarded at the Online Film Critics Society Award for Best Editing for his work on Requiem for a Dream and in 2011 for his work on The Tree of Life.

In 2012, the Motion Picture Editors Guild included two films edited by Rabinowitz in its listing of the best-edited films of all time. Requiem for a Dream (2000) was 29th, and The Tree of Life (2011) was 65th.

In 2019, he received the Sophia Lifetime Achievement Award from the Portuguese Academy of Motion Pictures Arts & Sciences (Academia Portuguesa das Artes e Ciências Cinematográficas).

== Filmography ==
Editor
| Year | Film | Director | Notes | Other notes |
|---|---|---|---|---|
| 1991 | Night on Earth | Jim Jarmusch | Third collaboration with Jim Jarmusch | |
| 1993 | Clean, Shaven | Lodge Kerrigan | First collaboration with Lodge Kerrigan | |
| 1993 | When Pigs Fly | Sara Driver | | |
| 1994 | Jimmy Hollywood | Barry Levinson | | |
| 1995 | Dead Man | Jim Jarmusch | Fourth collaboration with Jim Jarmusch | |
| 1996 | Mother Night | Keith Gordon | | |
| 1997 | Affliction | Paul Schrader | | |
| 1999 | Ghost Dog: The Way of the Samurai | Jim Jarmusch | Fifth collaboration with Jim Jarmusch | |
| 2000 | Requiem for a Dream | Darren Aronofsky | First collaboration with Darren Aronofsky | |
| 2001 | Big Bad Love | Arliss Howard | | |
| 2002 | Ten Minutes Older | Jim Jarmusch | Sixth collaboration with Jim Jarmusch | "Int. Trailer Night" segment |
| 2002 | 8 Mile | Curtis Hanson | | |
| 2002 | Bomb the System | Adam Bhala Lough | First collaboration with Adam Bhala Lough | |
| 2003 | Coffee and Cigarettes | Jim Jarmusch | Seventh collaboration with Jim Jarmusch | |
| 2004 | The Stepford Wives | Frank Oz | | |
| 2005 | Broken Flowers | Jim Jarmusch | Eighth collaboration with Jim Jarmusch | |
| 2006 | The Fountain | Darren Aronofsky | Second collaboration with Darren Aronofsky | |
| 2007 | Weapons | Adam Bhala Lough | Second collaboration with Adam Bhala Lough | |
| 2007 | I'm Not There | Todd Haynes | | |
| 2008 | Explicit Ills | Mark Webber | | |
| 2009 | The Limits of Control | Jim Jarmusch | Ninth collaboration with Jim Jarmusch | |
| 2009 | Women Without Men | Shirin Neshat; Shoja Azari | | |
| 2011 | The Adjustment Bureau | George Nolfi | | |
| 2011 | The Tree of Life | Terrence Malick | | |
| 2011 | Rampart | Oren Moverman | First collaboration with Oren Moverman | |
| 2014 | Rosewater | Jon Stewart | First collaboration with Jon Stewart | |
| 2016 | Junction 48 | Udi Aloni | | |
| 2018 | Boy Erased | Joel Edgerton | | |
| 2020 | Irresistible | Jon Stewart | Second collaboration with Jon Stewart | |
| 2021 | The United States vs. Billie Holiday | Lee Daniels | | |
| 2022 | Beast | Baltasar Kormákur | | |
| 2025 | O'Dessa | Geremy Jasper | | |
| 2026 | Is God Is | Aleshea Harris | | |

Editorial department
| Year | Film | Director | Role | Notes | Other notes |
|---|---|---|---|---|---|
| 1986 | Down by Law | Jim Jarmusch | Apprentice film editor | First collaboration with Jim Jarmusch | |
| 1988 | Homeboy | Michael Seresin | Assistant editor | | |
| 1988 | Rocket Gibraltar | Daniel Petrie | Assistant editor | | |
| 1989 | Mystery Train | Jim Jarmusch | Assistant film editor | Second collaboration with Jim Jarmusch | |
| 1999 | Three Seasons | Tony Bui | Additional editor | | |
| 2002 | Secretary | Steven Shainberg | Additional editor | | |
| 2010 | Salt | Phillip Noyce | Additional editor | | Uncredited |
| 2010 | Last Night | Massy Tadjedin | Additional editor | | |
| 2011 | Extremely Loud & Incredibly Close | Stephen Daldry | Additional editor | | |
| 2012 | On the Road | Walter Salles | Additional editor: NYC | | |
| 2016 | Norman | Joseph Cedar | Additional editor | | Uncredited |
| 2024 | IF | John Krasinski | Additional editing by | | |

Music department
| Year | Film | Director | Role |
|---|---|---|---|
| 1999 | Ghost Dog: The Way of the Samurai | Jim Jarmusch | Music editor |
| 2000 | Requiem for a Dream | Darren Aronofsky | Music editor |
| 2002 | Bomb the System | Adam Bhala Lough | Music editor |
| 2003 | Coffee and Cigarettes | Jim Jarmusch | Music editor: Feature version |
| 2005 | Broken Flowers | Jim Jarmusch | Music editor |
| 2009 | The Limits of Control | Jim Jarmusch | Music editor |

Sound department
| Year | Film | Director | Role |
|---|---|---|---|
| 1987 | Dead of Winter | Arthur Penn | Apprentice sound editor |
| 1987 | The Glass Menagerie | Paul Newman | Apprentice sound editor |
| 1990 | Alice | Woody Allen | Assistant sound editor |

Thanks
| Year | Film | Director | Role | Notes |
|---|---|---|---|---|
| 1999 | Outside Providence | Michael Corrente | Special editing thanks to | |
| 2004 | Keane | Lodge Kerrigan | Special thanks | Second collaboration with Lodge Kerrigan |
| 2008 | Wendy and Lucy | Kelly Reichardt | Special thanks | |
| 2012 | Cove Road | Jonathan Keogh | Very special thanks | |
| 2017 | The Dinner | Oren Moverman | Special thanks | Second collaboration with Oren Moverman |
| 2018 | Diane | Kent Jones | Special thanks | |

Documentaries

Editor
| Year | Film | Director |
|---|---|---|
| 1997 | Year of the Horse | Jim Jarmusch |
| 2017 | The New Radical | Adam Bhala Lough |
| 2020 | Why Is We Americans? | Udi Aloni; Ayana Stafford-Morris |

Editorial department
| Year | Film | Director | Role |
|---|---|---|---|
| 2007 | Chicago 10: Speak Your Peace | Brett Morgen | Editorial consultant |
| 2014 | Evaporating Borders | Iva Radivojevic | Consulting editor |
| 2021 | Aleph | Iva Radivojevic | Consulting editor |

Thanks
| Year | Film | Director | Role |
|---|---|---|---|
| 2015 | Hot Sugar's Cold World | Adam Bhala Lough | Special thanks |

Shorts

Editor
| Year | Film | Director |
|---|---|---|
| 1989 | Coyote Mountain | Jeffrey W. Mueller |
| 1994 | The Bowery | Sara Driver |
| 1998 | Richard Lester! | Stacy Cochran |
| 2012 | First Point | Taylor Steele |
| 2016 | Application for the Position of Abdelhalim Hafez's Girl | Donna Lamar |
| 2019 | The Sound of a Wild Snail Eating | Elisabeth Tova Bailey |
| 2019 | White Echo | Chloë Sevigny |

Editorial department
| Year | Film | Director | Role |
|---|---|---|---|
| 2015 | Notes from the Border | Iva Radivojevic | Consulting editor |

Thanks
| Year | Film | Director | Role |
|---|---|---|---|
| 2012 | Bored Games | Jonathan Fischer | Additional acknowledgments |

TV movies

Editor
| Year | Film | Director |
|---|---|---|
| 1992 | Last Supper | Robert Frank |
| 2000 | Homicide: The Movie | Jean de Segonzac |
| 2005 | Dawn Anna | Arliss Howard |
| 2021 | Oslo | Bartlett Sher |

TV series

Editor
| Year | Title | Notes |
|---|---|---|
| 1993−98 | Homicide: Life on the Street | 26 episodes |
| 2002 | Oz | 3 episodes |
| 2016 | Codes of Conduct | 1 episode |
