= Ethan Higbee =

American filmmaker, music producer and gallerist

- Education: New York University
- Occupations: Film-maker, music producer
- Notable work: Red Apples Falling; The Upsetter

Ethan Higbee (also known as Nahte) is an American filmmaker, music producer and gallerist living in Ojai, California. He is most known for his films Red Apples Falling and The Upsetter, a documentary about Lee Scratch Perry.

In 2010, he opened Dem Passwords art gallery in West Hollywood, California. The gallery owns and represents the painting collection of Lee Scratch Perry and hosted his first solo art exhibition called 'Secret Education' in 2010.

== Early life and education ==
Higbee was born and raised in Maine. He studied at the Mt. Ararat High School and was a six time All-American in youth and high school track & field and cross country, capturing over 25 individual and team state championships over four different sports As a 14-year-old he was featured in Sports Illustrated Magazine's Faces in the Crowd for winning two state titles in cross country and soccer in the same day. In 1994 he stood 3rd in the 2000m steeplechase at the USA Track & Field Junior Olympics National Championships at the University of Florida.

In 1996, Higbee gave up a potential Olympic dream in the running to pursue a career in direction after he was accepted into the Maurice Kandbar Institute of Film and Television at the Tisch School of the Arts at New York University where he graduated in 2001. Before attending NYU, he skipped the majority of his senior year at Mt. Ararat High School after convincing the principal to let him enroll in a film residency at the Maine Media Workshops.

== Career ==
Higbee met Adam Bhala Lough when they were enrolled at New York University. The two have collaborated on several projects. Higbee has been composer on Lough's films. Besides composing music Higbee has also been a director, screenwriter, producer, and cinematographer for different projects. In 2002, Higbee co-founded media production company called Permanent Marks with fellow conspirator Sebastian Demian.

He has composed the music to feature films including The Carter, and Weapons.

In 2003, he produced his first feature documentary Haro Hara: Pilgrimage to Kataragama Sri Lanka a film following Tamil devotees of Lord Murugan on the ancient Pada Yatra pilgrimage down the war torn east coast of Sri Lanka.

In 2005, Higbee directed the video of Damian Marley's song Confrontation.

In 2008, Higbee premiered The Upsetter: The Life and Music of Lee "Scratch" Perry, a documentary following Lee "Scratch" Perry, at the SXSW Film Festival. Named after Perry's 1969 album of the same name, the film played in dozens of film festivals worldwide, and was screened across in nearly 100 theaters in 2011. The film is equally devoted to thirty years of Jamaican music and culture, and was narrated by Benicio Del Toro. The movie was co-written and co-directed by Higbee and Lough who also distributed the movie by themselves.

Higbee wanted to make a movie on Perry since he was in New York University. He tried contacting Perry several times, however, he was never able to pitch the idea of a movie to him. Finally in 2005, Higbee and Lough were able to pitch their idea to Perry, who agreed on making a documentary. In 2006, they spent eight days with Perry in Switzerland, then a year and a half following Perry around the world.

In 2009, Higbee directed the documentary film Red Apples Falling, produced by Damon Dash and Lough. The film is an uncensored look at the life of Jim Jones. In 2010, he opened Dem Passwords art gallery in West Hollywood California. The gallery owns and represents the painting collection of Lee Scratch Perry and hosted his first solo art exhibition called 'Secret Education' in 2010.

In 2011, after the end of the Sri Lankan civil war, Ethan along with Samuel Holt and Suba Sivakumaran founded KIFF, the Kandy International Film Festival, the first international film festival in Sri Lanka.

In 2013, he formed the production company Rain Dominion with collaborator Adam Bhala Lough to produce the skateboard documentary series The Motivation. Upon release The Motivation was the #1 documentary on iTunes for 13 consecutive days. The Motivation 2: The Chris Cole Story was released worldwide on June 23, 2015, and also stood as the #1 documentary on iTunes for over a week. In 2013, he co-produced Lee "Scratch" Perry Blue Ark Fm Radio Station for Grand Theft Auto V.

Since 2008, Higbee has been in production on a movie titled Basedworld, a documentary about Lil B, however since 2014 the project has been delayed.

Higbee is currently in production directing a film on the life of Cuban Boxer Teófilo Stevenson a co-production with the Cuban Institute of Cinematographic Art and Industry.

== Filmography ==
=== As a producer ===
Year	Title	Notes
2001	Roundest Wheel	producer, director
2006	Haro Hara: Pilgrimage to Kataragama Sri Lanka	producer, director
2009	Red Apples Falling	producer, director
2011	The Upsetter	producer, director
2013	Basedworld	producer, director
2013	The Motivation	producer
2015	The Motivation 2 – The Chris Cole Story	producer
2016	Untitled Teofilo Stevenson Project	producer, director

=== As a composer ===
Year	Title
2001	Roundest Wheel
2002	Bomb The System
2005	Waterborne
2007	Weapons
2008	The Carter
2009	Red Apples Falling
2011	The Upsetter
