= Indiscreet =

Indiscreet may refer to:

- Indiscreet (1931 film), a film starring Gloria Swanson
- Indiscreet (1958 film), a romantic comedy starring Ingrid Bergman and Cary Grant
- Indiscreet (1998 film), a thriller starring Luke Perry and Gloria Reuben
- Indiscreet (FM album), 1986
- Indiscreet (Sparks album), 1975
- "Indiscreet" song written by Jimmy Van Heusen and Sammy Cahn
