= Kunle Martins =

American artist

Earsnot IRAK
- Born: Kunle F. Martins Jr. 1980 (age 44–45); New York City
- Occupation: Artist
- Known for: Founder of IRAK crew
- Movement: Graffiti
- Website: Mr. Kunle F Martins Jr. on Instagram

Kunle Martins is an American artist. He was born in 1980 in New York, where he currently lives and works. In 1997, Martins founded IRAK, a graffiti crew that included Dash Snow, Dan Colen, Joey Semz and Ryan McGinley among others.

As a graffiti artist, Martins gained notoriety tagging as Earsnot. More recently, Martins’ artistic practice has been based in portraiture. He has also collaborated with Dover Street Market, Supreme, and Adidas. Martins is represented by the New York gallery 56 HENRY.

== Solo exhibitions ==
Martins most recently exhibited works in 2021 at Bortolami Gallery in New York, in a solo show titled S3ND NUD3S. He presented What’s Up Fam? at 56 HENRY in early 2020, and Portraits: Looking Like a Snack at Shoot the Lobster in New York in early 2019.

== Group exhibitions ==
In spring 2019 Martins collaborated with contemporary artist and romantic partner Jack Pierson on the exhibition Pee Party at Jeffrey Stark in New York. Martins' work has appeared in other group shows at galleries and cultural institutions throughout the United States and Europe, including The Hole, New York; Beyond the Streets, New York; White Columns Benefit Auction, New York; Amelchenko, New York; Bonnie Poon, Paris; Coney Art Walls, New York; Wynwood Walls, Miami; Museum of Contemporary Art, Los Angeles; and Clayton Patterson Gallery, New York.

== Personal life ==
Martins is gay.
