= Adam Bhala Lough =

American film director

- Born: May 9, 1979 (age 47); New York
- Occupations: Film director, screenwriter
- Years active: 2002–present

Adam Bhala Lough is an American film director, screenwriter, and documentary filmmaker from Fairfax, Virginia. Known for his dramas about subcultures and popular youth cultures, several of Lough's films have been selected as part of the Sundance Film Festival, and is the only filmmaker with a feature film and a documentary in the festival, as well as a screenplay selected for the annual Sundance Screenwriter's Lab.

== Early life ==
Adam Bhala Lough was born in New York and raised in Fairfax, Virginia. In his teenage years, Lough spent his time restocking shelves at Blockbuster, where he was inspired by the independent cinema of the early 1990s. Armed with a borrowed Panasonic VHS Camcorder, Lough shot several short films with his friends, and edited them tape to tape at the local public access television station, submitting one to the film school program at New York University.

== Career ==
The rapper MF Doom gave Lough his first big break at age 19 when he let him direct two music videos from his debut solo studio album Operation: Doomsday.

=== Feature films ===
In 2002, Lough expanded his New York University thesis project to create Bomb the System, starring Mark Webber, Gano Grills, and Jaclyn DeSantis. With a budget of $500,000 and a crew composed mostly of Lough's fellow recent NYU graduates, Bomb the System was shot in New York City. The film garnered the then 23-year-old Lough a Best First Feature nomination at the 2003 Independent Spirit Awards. Bomb the System was released by Palm Pictures in 2005.

In 2007, Lough wrote and directed Weapons starring Nick Cannon and Paul Dano and a host of upcoming young actors and actresses. Weapons was an experiment in non-linear storytelling tackling the problem of youth violence, and premiered in competition at the 2007 Sundance Film Festival, where it was nominated for the Grand Jury Prize.

=== Documentary work ===
In 2007 and 2008, Lough transitioned into documentary when he spent a year on the road with Lil Wayne, shooting what would become The Carter. The documentary was shot in the time before and shortly after the release of Lil Wayne's Tha Carter III. The film was critically acclaimed and premiered at the 2009 Sundance Film Festival, where IndieWire dubbed it the "best film of the festival", but raised controversy when Lil Wayne attempted to block the release of the film, due to its depiction of his marijuana and cough syrup use. The case was eventually thrown out of court by a judge.

In 2008, Lough premiered The Upsetter: The Life and Music of Lee "Scratch" Perry, a documentary following Lee "Scratch" Perry, at the SXSW Film Festival. Named after Perry's 1969 album of the same name, the film played in dozens of film festivals worldwide, and was screened across the globe in nearly 100 theaters in 2011. The film is equally devoted to thirty years of Jamaican music and culture, and was narrated by Academy Award winner Benicio Del Toro.

Lough's first sports documentary The Motivation premiered at the Tribeca Film Festival in late April 2013. The film follows eight of the best professional skateboarders in the world, including Ryan Sheckler, Nyjah Huston, and Paul Rodriguez III. Netflix commissioned two sequels: Motivation 2: The Chris Cole Story and Motivation 3: The Next Generation.

In 2017, Lough switched to political documentaries, profiling millennial radicals from the U.S. and the U.K. attacking the system through dangerous technological means. The documentary film, titled The New Radical, premiered in competition at the 2017 Sundance Film Festival and featured Cody Wilson, Amir Taaki, Julian Assange, and others. IndieWire called it "A real life Mr. Robot," in reference to the popular television series. Lough followed up this film with Alt Right: Age of Rage, a documentary about the Alt-Right movement that ended in tragedy at the Unite the Right Rally in Charlottesville, Virginia, where his crew was caught in the melee. Age of Rage premiered on Netflix in the US and BBC in the UK. In 2019, Lough executive produced the first feature from his long-time editor Alex Lee Moyer, TFW NO GF, an exploration of incel culture in America.

Lough and his cousin Sam Lipman-Stern directed Telemarketers, released on HBO in 2023. It revolves around two employees determined to expose the telemarketing industry. Danny McBride, David Gordon Green, Josh Safdie, and Benny Safdie were executive producers. Telemarketers was the most-watched series on HBO in over two years, with 2 million average viewers per episode and was nominated for a Primetime Emmy Award for Outstanding Documentary Series.

Lough directed Deepfaking Sam Altman, a hybrid comedy-documentary about artificial intelligence, produced by Kevin Hart and New York Magazine. It was given a limited release in 2026 and it received positive reviews from critics.

== Filmography ==
Year	Title	Director	Producer	Writer
2002	Bomb the System	Yes	No	Yes
2007	Weapons	Yes	No	Yes
2008	The Upsetter: The Life and Music of Lee "Scratch" Perry	Yes	Yes	Yes
2009	The Carter	Yes	Yes	—N/a
2009	Red Apples Falling	No	Yes	—N/a
2013	The Motivation	Yes	Yes	—N/a
2015	Hot Sugar's Cold World	Yes	Yes	Yes
2015	Motivation 2: The Chris Cole Story	Yes	Yes	—N/a
2017	The New Radical	Yes	No	Yes
2017	Motivation 3	Yes	Yes	—N/a
2018	Alt-Right: Age of Rage	Yes	No	Yes
2020	TFW NO GF	No	Yes	No
2023	Telemarketers	Yes	Yes	No
2026	Deepfaking Sam Altman	Yes	Yes	Yes
