= Bomb the System =

- Promotional movie poster
- Directed by: Adam Bhala Lough
- Written by: Adam Bhala Lough
- Produced by: Ben Rekhi; Sol Tryon
- Starring: Mark Webber; Jade Yorker; Jaclyn DeSantis; Gano Grills
- Cinematography: Ben Kutchins
- Edited by: Jay Rabinowitz
- Music by: Sebastian Demian; El-P; Ethan Higbee; International Friends
- Distributed by: Palm Pictures
- Release dates: December 2002 (Anchorage International Film Festival); May 27, 2005 (U.S.)
- Running time: 91 minutes
- Country: United States
- Languages: English; Hindi
- Box office: $15,520

Bomb the System is a 2002 drama film written and directed by Adam Bhala Lough. It stars Mark Webber, Gano Grills, Jaclyn DeSantis, Jade Yorker, Bönz Malone, Kumar Pallana and Joey SEMZ. The story revolves around a group of graffiti artists who decide to make a mark on New York City.

Bomb the System was the first major fictional feature film about the subculture of graffiti art since 1982’s Wild Style. Several well-known graffiti artists participated in the making of the film, including Lee Quiñones, Cope2, Chino BYI and Keo X-Men. The film's score and soundtrack were composed by El-P.

In December 2002, the film premiered at the Anchorage International Film Festival. It went on to screen at various film festivals including the Tribeca Festival. It was given a limited theatrical release in American theaters on May 27, 2005. It was nominated for an Independent Spirit Award for Best First Feature and won the Audience Award at the 2003 Athens International Film Festival.

== Cast ==
- Mark Webber as Anthony 'Blest' Campo
- Jaclyn DeSantis as Alexandria
- Jade Yorker as Kevin 'Lune' Broady
- Gano Grills as Justin 'Buk 50' Broady
- Bönz Malone as Officer Nole Shorts
- Kumar Pallana as Kumar Baba
- Jason Lopez as Merit
- Joey SEMZ as Knife

== Production ==
The film was expanded from Lough’s thesis project at NYU. Lough’s fellow NYU graduates collaborated with him on the film as producer, cinematographer, and other key members of the crew.

== Release ==
The film had its world premiere at the Anchorage International Film Festival in December 2002, winning the award for Best Feature.

After a 1-minute clip of the film was shown during the 2004 Independent Spirit Awards, Now on Media in Japan offered to acquire distribution rights. The film received a wide theatrical release in Japan on September 3, 2005.

In the US, the film was distributed by Palm Pictures and was shown in New York City and Los Angeles on May 27, 2005. The film grossed a per-screen average of $4,588.

=== Sticker controversy ===
Shortly after the theatrical release, a movie theater in Delaware was closed down after a promotional Bomb the System sticker was found illegally posted in the theater. Due to fear of terrorism, the theater manager called the police and bomb squad and the theater was shut down for a few hours while the canine unit sniffed for bombs. Nothing was found. In graffiti terminology, "bombing" has nothing to do with actual explosives, and instead refers to slang for covering a surface with graffiti.

=== Home media ===
The film was released on DVD on October 11, 2005.

== Critical response ==
Rolling Stone called the film a "next-gen [sic] update of 1982's Wild Style. With strong whiffs of Trainspotting and Kids" that "distinguishes itself with streaky, Krylon-bright editing and El-P's eerie soundtrack beats." Village Voice noted the movie was "birthed from a blunt-fueled blend of Aronofskian frenzy and nostalgia for the agreeable griminess of mid-'90s Wu-Tang Clan videos." Los Angeles Times critic Kevin Crust wrote, "Lough's impressive, if uneven, debut feature captures the adrenaline rush and contradictory nature of the simultaneously creative and criminal activity." Stephen Holden of The New York Times reviewed the film positively: "The movie runs on the synergy between this grimy but glamorous urban landscape and the emotional intensity of characters who at moments suggest contemporary descendants of the innocent, tormented teenagers in Rebel Without a Cause. Bomb the System, which rides on a subtle hip-hop soundtrack, might be described as soulful pulp; cult recognition awaits it."

On the critical side, The New York Post called the film "a mild, slow-moving drama that belatedly tries to argue that graffiti writers are political artists, not an urban blight". The New York Daily News called the film "brashly passionate in its desire to express the power and validity of graffiti art. But it's also preachy and single-minded, populated by a world of sympathetic heroes and hissable villains". Sean Axmaker in the Seattle Post-Intelligencer likened the film to "tomcats spraying outside their yards."

Filmmaker Jim Jarmusch wrote, "For Bomb the System director Adam Lough takes far more inspiration from the on-going graffiti culture than from the depleted stylistic formulas of recent commercial cinema. His refreshing use of skewed camera angles, blasts of color, and inventive cutting are deftly blended, becoming much more than calculated atmosphere. The performances are also consistently strong, and Mark Webber in particular, in the central role, never hits a false note. Bomb the System is welcome proof that the spirit of graffiti writing has a continuing cultural influence on both the subtleties of form and explosive personal expression." Parts of the quotation ran in a Village Voice ad on the second weekend of the film's release.

On review aggregate website Rotten Tomatoes, Bomb the System has an approval rating of 32% based on 22 reviews. The site’s critics consensus reads, "Given the movie's premise, one would assume it's gritty and street-smart, but in reality it's a slave to stale cliches and formula."
