= Al Freeman =

Al Freeman may refer to:

- Al Freeman Jr. (1934–2012), American actor, director, and educator
- Al Freeman (artist) (born 1981), New York–based artist
