= Lee "Scratch" Perry =

Jamaican reggae singer and producer (1936–2021)

Lee "Scratch" Perry OD
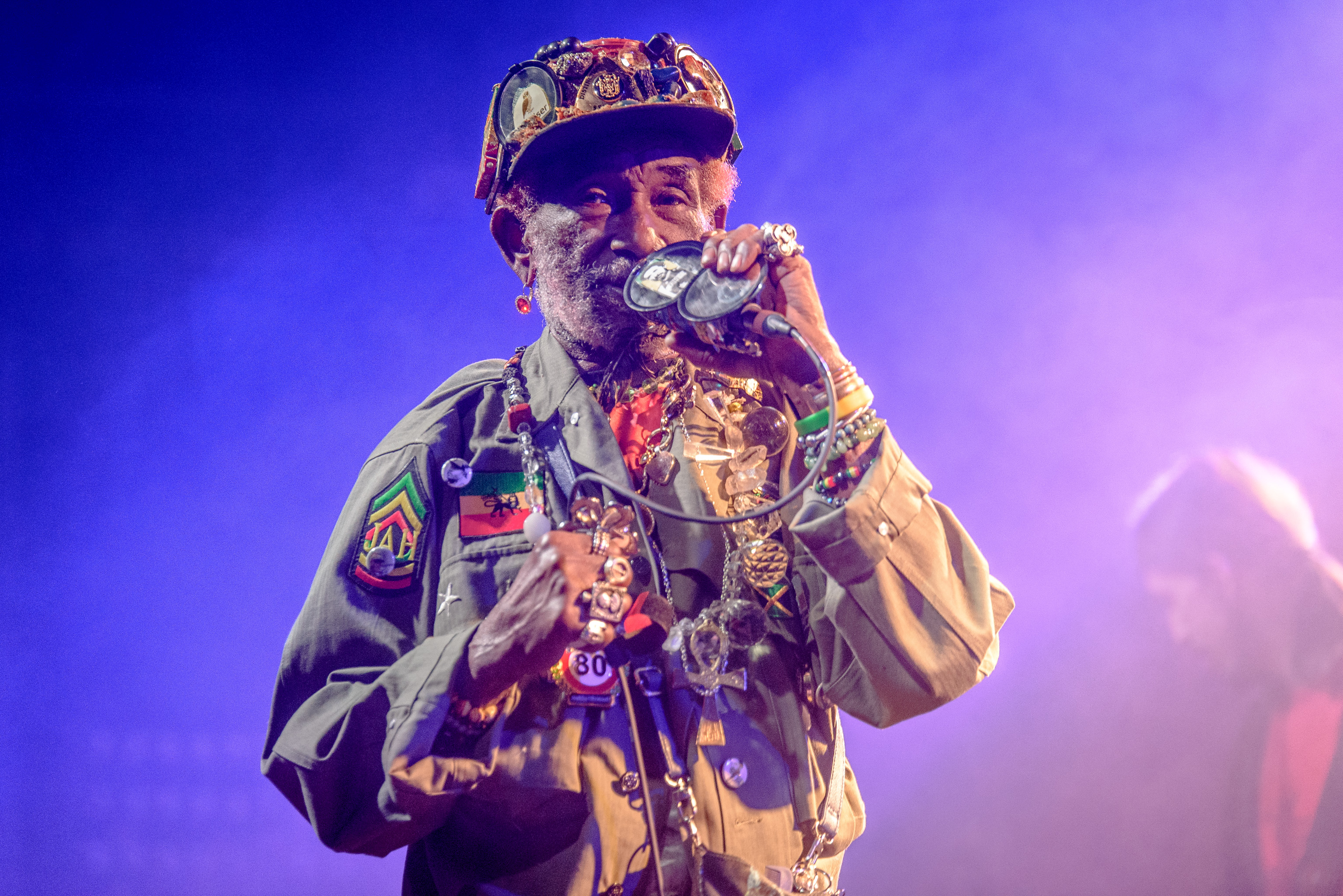
- Perry performing in Munich, 2016

Background information
- Also known as: Pipecock Jackson (Note: Often stylized as Pipecock Jackxon.); The Upsetter
- Born: Rainford Hugh Perry; 20 March 1936; Kendal, Hanover, Jamaica
- Origin: Kingston, Jamaica
- Died: 29 August 2021 (aged 85) (Note: His wife, Mireille, claims he died on the way to the hospital on 28 August.) Lucea, Hanover, Jamaica
- Genres: Dub; reggae; ska; rocksteady; jungle; electronic
- Occupations: Record producer; singer; songwriter
- Years active: 1958–2021
- Labels: Trojan; Pama; Upsetter; Creole; Black Art; Secret; Island; Burning Sounds; Goldenlane
- Website: http://www.lee-perry.com/ (no longer works as it requires Adobe Flash)

Lee "Scratch" Perry (born Rainford Hugh Perry; 20 March 1936 – 29 August 2021) was a Jamaican record producer, singer and songwriter noted for his innovative studio techniques and production style. Perry was a pioneer in the 1970s development of dub music with his early adoption of remixing and studio effects to create new instrumental or vocal versions of existing reggae tracks. He worked with and produced for a wide variety of artists, including Bob Marley and the Wailers, Junior Murvin, the Congos, Max Romeo, the Heptones, Adrian Sherwood, the Beastie Boys, Ari Up, the Clash, the Orb, and many others.

== Early life ==
Rainford Hugh Perry was born on 20 March 1936 in Kendal, Jamaica, in the parish of Hanover, the third child of Ina Davis and Henry Perry. His mother had strong African traditions originating from her Yoruba ancestry that she passed on to her son. His parents were both laborers, but his father later became a professional dancer.

Lee left school at age 15 and lived in Hanover, working as a labourer to help build the first road in Negril. He eventually wound up in Clarendon where he got into the dance and music scene and earned the nickname "The Neat Little Thing". Lee later moved to Kingston after experiencing a mystical connection to stones ("When the stones clash, I hear like the thunder clash... and I hear words... These words send me to Kingston. Kingston means King's Stone, the Son of the King... the stone that I was throwing in Negril send me to King Stone for my graduation.") where he apprenticed at Studio One.

== Career ==
=== Early work ===
Perry's musical career began in the late 1950s as a record seller for Clement Coxsone Dodd's sound system. As his sometimes turbulent relationship with Dodd developed, he found himself performing a variety of important tasks at Dodd's Studio One hit factory, going on to record nearly thirty songs for the label. Disagreements between the pair due to personality and financial conflicts led him to leave the studio and seek new musical outlets. He soon found a new home at Joe Gibbs's Amalgamated Records.

Working with Gibbs, Perry continued his recording career but, once again, financial problems caused conflict. Perry broke ranks with Gibbs in 1968 and formed his own label, Upsetter Records.

After leaving Gibbs, Perry attracted a core group of skilled session musicians who became the nucleus of the Upsetters, including pianist Gladstone Anderson, organist Winston Wright, bassist Clifton "Jackie" Jackson, and drummer Lloyd Adams. According to author Lloyd Bradley, Perry was able to attract musicians of this caliber less through money than through the creative freedom he offered, encouraging experimentation within the emerging reggae style and giving players greater latitude to develop arrangements and ideas.

His first major single "People Funny Boy", which was an insult directed at Gibbs, did well with 60,000 copies sold in Jamaica alone. It is notable for its innovative use of a sample (a crying baby) as well as a fast, chugging beat that would soon become identifiable as "reggae". Similarly his acrimonious 1967 single as Lee "King" Perry, "Run for Cover", was aimed at Coxsone.

From 1968 until 1972, he worked with the Upsetters. During this period, Perry released numerous recordings on a variety of record labels that he controlled, and many of his songs were popular in both Jamaica and the United Kingdom, where his instrumental "The Return of Django" was a top five hit in 1969. Although Perry did not yet have his own studio, Bradley notes that between 1968 and 1972 he produced a remarkable amount of music.

Around 1970, Perry began working with the Wailers after Bob Marley approached him about a collaboration, despite Perry having largely withdrawn from producing singers following the success of his Upsetter instrumentals. During their sessions at Randy's Recording Studio, Perry worked alongside engineer Errol Thompson, encouraging the use of effects including reverb and delay. Perry and members of the Wailers also drew material from everyday life, sometimes travelling around Kingston and developing songs based on incidents they encountered.

During the early 1970s, Perry worked primarily at Randy's Recording Studio, producing recordings under his own name, with the Upsetters, and with singers including Dave Barker, Leo Graham and Junior Byles. According to music historian Lloyd Bradley, Perry's distinctive production style emerged between 1971 and 1974, characterized by slower rhythms, dense mixes and an unconventional approach to lyrics.

=== The Black Ark ===
In 1973, Perry built a studio in his back yard, the Black Ark, to have more control over his productions and continued to produce artists such as Bob Marley and the Wailers, Junior Byles, Junior Murvin, the Heptones, the Congos, and Max Romeo. He also started the Black Art label, on which many of the productions from the studio appeared.

Having his own studio allowed Perry to spend more time developing his productions. His arrangements were often conceived with later versions and mixes already in mind, and he sometimes directed musicians to record individual parts according to how he intended to use them in the finished production. Working with four-track equipment, Perry frequently combined tracks to free space for additional overdubs. Perry was known to remain in the studio for days at a time when mixing, taking no visitors or calls, and very little food or drink.

After establishing the Black Ark, Perry began working more extensively with vocalists, having previously concentrated on instrumental recordings. He incorporated dub techniques into backing tracks before recording vocals, rather than producing dub versions only after completing vocal recordings. Perry also accumulated a large collection of previously recorded backing tracks, which he could adapt for new songs without hiring session musicians for each recording.

Music historian Lloyd Bradley described the 1976 album Super Ape as a culmination of Perry's work at the Black Ark, combining fragments of vocals and earlier recordings into dense arrangements while drawing thematically on Rastafari, righteousness and repatriation.

By 1978, stress and unwanted outside influences began to take their toll: both Perry and the Black Ark quickly fell into a state of disrepair. Eventually, the studio burned to the ground. Perry has constantly insisted that he burned the Black Ark himself in a fit of rage.

=== After the Black Ark (1980s and 1990s) ===
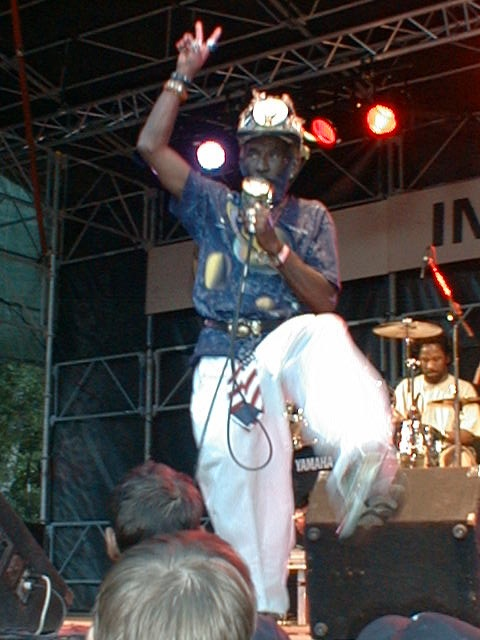
Perry performing in 1998

After the demise of the Black Ark in the early 1980s, Perry spent time in England and the United States, performing live and making erratic records with a variety of collaborators. His career took a new path in 1984 when he met Mark Downie (Marcus Upbeat) with whom he worked on the 1986 album Battle of Armagideon for Trojan. It was not until the late 1980s, when he began working with British producers Adrian Sherwood and Neil Fraser (who is better known as Mad Professor), that Perry's career began to get back on solid ground again. Perry also attributed a later resurgence of his creative muse to his deciding to quit drinking alcohol and smoking cannabis. In his earlier days, the act of producing for Perry was a frenzied and ritualistic one where he stated that "he blew smoke into the microphone so that the weed would get into the song." Perry stated in an interview that he wanted to see if "it was the smoke making the music or Lee Perry making the music. I found out it was me and that I don't need to smoke."

In 1998, Perry reached a wider global audience as vocalist on the track "Dr. Lee, PhD" from the Beastie Boys' album Hello Nasty.

=== Later career ===
In 2003, Perry won a Grammy for Best Reggae Album with the album Jamaican E.T. In 2004, Rolling Stone ranked Perry number 100 on their list of the 100 Greatest Artists of All Time. He teamed up with a group of Swiss musicians and performed under the name Lee Perry and the White Belly Rats, and toured the United States in 2006 and 2007 using the New York City-based group Dub Is a Weapon as his backing band.

After meeting Andrew W.K. at SXSW in 2006, Perry invited him to co-produce his album Repentance. The album, released on 19 August 2008 through Narnack Records, featured several guest artists including Moby, Ari Up, producer Don Fleming, drummer Brian Chippendale, and bassist Josh Werner.

In 2007, Perry's song "Enter the Dragon" was sampled on the track "Carrots" by Panda Bear of Animal Collective. As well, Perry was selected by Animal Collective in 2011 to perform at All Tomorrow's Parties, which the band curated in May 2011. That same year, he recorded Rise Again with bassist and producer Bill Laswell; the album featured contributions from Tunde Adebimpe, Sly Dunbar, and Bernie Worrell, and was released on Laswell's M.O.D. Technologies label.

In 2008, Perry reunited with Adrian Sherwood on The Mighty Upsetter. Between 2007 and 2010, Perry recorded three albums with British producer Steve Marshall whom he met at Pyramid Arts Development in Hackney. The albums featured performances by Keith Richards and George Clinton. Two of these albums, End of an American Dream (2008) and Revelation (2010), received Grammy nominations in the category Best Reggae Album.

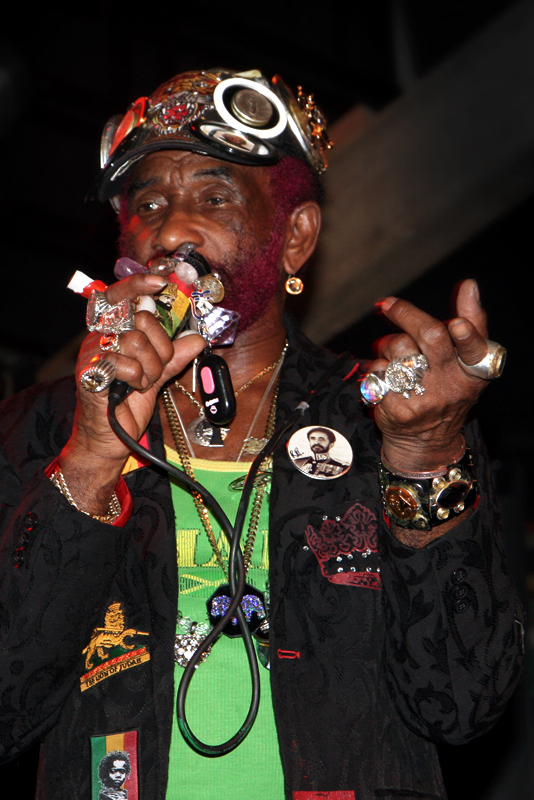
Perry in 2009

In 2009, Perry collaborated with Dubblestandart on their Return from Planet Dub double album, revisiting some of his material from the 1970s and 1980s, as well as collaborating on new material with Dubblestandart, some of which also included Ari Up of the Slits. In 2008, leading up to this release, Perry's first foray into the dubstep genre was released on 12" vinyl, a collaboration with Dubblestandart and New York City's Subatomic Sound System called "Iron Devil". That record was followed by several more reggae-oriented dubstep collaborations with Dubblestandart and Subatomic Sound System on digital and vinyl, first Blackboard Jungle volumes 1 and 2 (2009), featuring dancehall vocalist Jahdan Blakkamoore, then Chrome Optimism (2010), which also featured American filmmaker David Lynch. Following that, in 2010, Perry and Ari Up of the Slits collaborated on a limited-edition Subatomic Sound System 7" called "Hello, Hell Is Very Low", a rootical dubstep release that would turn out to be one of Ari Up's last recordings and the final release during her lifetime.

In 2010, Perry had his first ever solo art exhibition at Dem Passwords art gallery in Los Angeles, California. The show, titled "Secret Education", featured works on canvas, paper, and a video installation.

In 2011, The Upsetter, a documentary film about Perry, narrated by Benicio Del Toro, was released worldwide in theaters after its premiere at the 2008 SXSW Film Festival. The film was directed and produced by American film makers Ethan Higbee and Adam Bhala Lough, and opened in Los Angeles in March 2011. It continued to screen worldwide into 2012, with the DVD, iTunes, and Video on Demand following soon thereafter.

In 2012, Perry teamed with the Orb to produce The Orbserver in the Star House, which was recorded in Berlin over a period of several months. The album earned critical acclaim, and featured the single "Golden Clouds", named after the historic property located near Perry's hometown in Jamaica. The recording sessions were filmed by Volker Schaner and were part of the documentary Lee Scratch Perry's Vision of Paradise.

In August 2012, it was announced that Perry would receive Jamaica's sixth highest honour, the Order of Distinction, Commander class.

In 2013, Perry performed at the first Dub Champions Festival in Vienna, a sold-out performance, backed by Dubblestandart with Adrian Sherwood handling the dub mix. Perry also performed at the first two Dub Champions Festivals in New York City in 2011 and 2012, backed by Subatomic Sound System. Perry performed at the 2013 Coachella Valley Music and Arts Festival in Indio, California.

Perry is featured as the DJ on the dub and reggae radio station "The Blue Ark" in Grand Theft Auto V. The station includes a number of dubs by Perry and the Upsetters including "Disco Devil" and "Grumblin' Dub".

In October 2013, it was announced that Perry will be awarded a Gold Musgrave Medal later that month by the Institute of Jamaica.

Perry recorded an album with Daniel Boyle in London, released in May 2014 as Lee "Scratch" Perry – Back on the Controls. The album received a Grammy nomination later that year.

Perry remixed the "Thor's Stone" single by UK producer Forest Swords in November 2013.

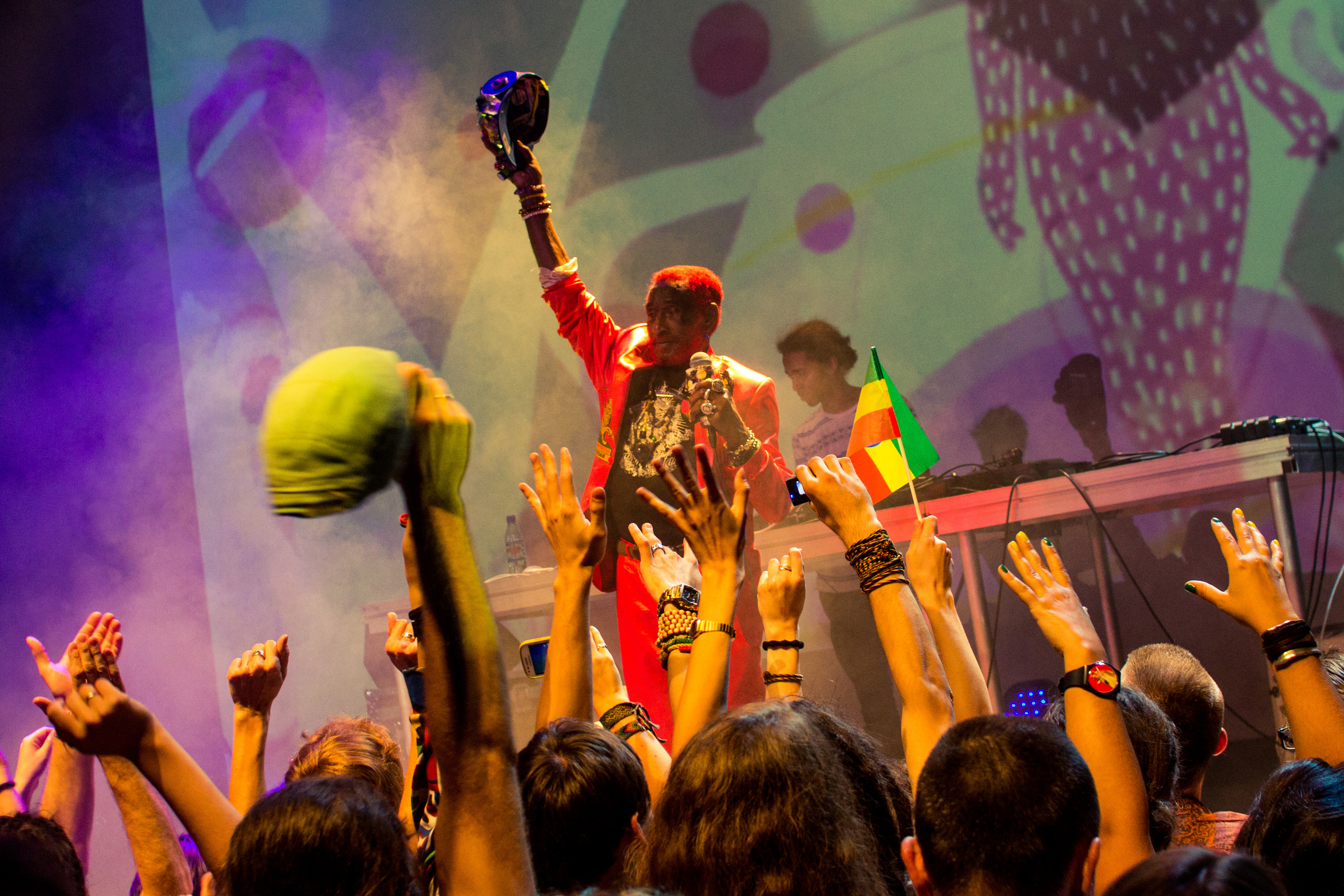
Perry performing in Saint Petersburg, Russia, in August 2015

In 2015, the documentary Lee Scratch Perry's Vision of Paradise had a worldwide release in cinemas as well as on DVD and VOD after premiering at the East End Film Festival in London. The film followed Perry for 15 years through his home in Switzerland and travels abroad.

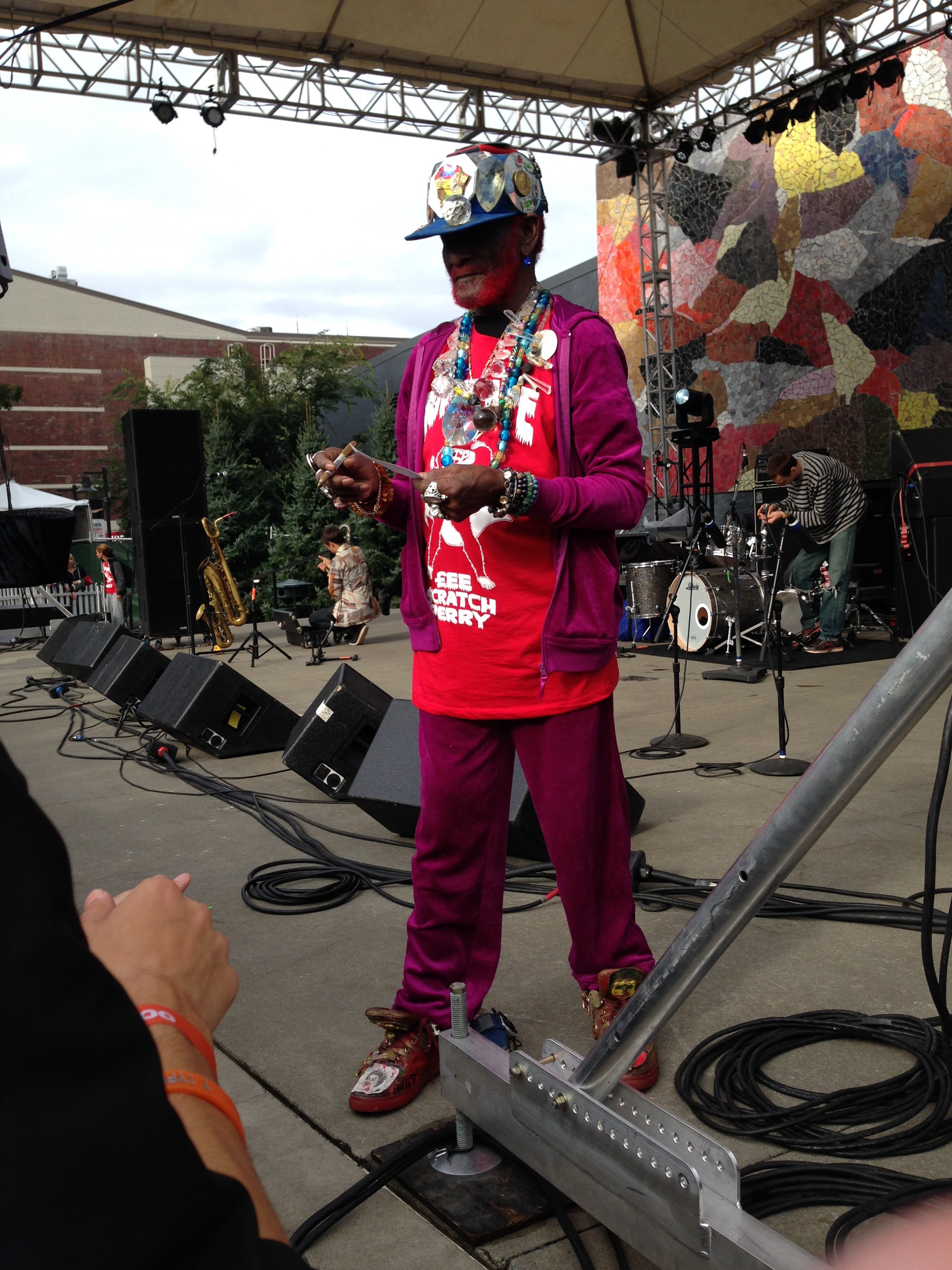
Perry signing an autograph for a fan after a performance at Bumbershoot in 2015.

In September 2015, Perry and Subatomic Sound System launched a 40th anniversary tour for Perry's 1976 album Super Ape. The tour began as part of Dub Champions Festival and continued over the next two years with more than 50 dates in North America and some isolated dates in Europe. Nearly every show was sold out on the 2015 and 2016 tours. It culminated with the release of the Super Ape Returns to Conquer album in September 2017 which debuted at number 2 on iTunes US reggae chart behind Bob Marley's remastered Legend album, and on number 3 on the Billboard reggae chart. Larry McDonald performed as part of the band and on the recorded album. A Kickstarter campaign was organized in 2015 by Emch of Subatomic Sound System to raise funds to build a custom 15-foot-tall gorilla similar to the one on the original album cover art. The Kickstarter campaign reached its goal and the gorilla appeared on stage during 2015 and 2016 tour dates.

In October 2018, Perry and Subatomic Sound System launched a 45th anniversary tour for the 1973 album Blackboard Jungle Dub, produced by Perry. The tour began in North America and tour posters includes the tag line "World's 1st dub album, Live for the first time". Rolling Stone published a preview of the tour.

2019 saw the release of The Revelation of Lee "Scratch" Perry, a film about the making of his 2010 album Revelation, directed by Steve Marshall for State of Emergency. The film features intimate behind the scenes footage of Perry at work in his home studio in the Swiss Alps and an in depth interview with him.

In April 2019, hip-hop producer Mr. Green announced that he would be doing a record made out of Perry's famous audio stems. In July 2019, Perry announced that the record is entitled Super Ape vs. 緑: Open Door and that it would release through Tuff Kong Records on 19 August 2019. The record combined over 20 different genres of music. Hypebeast said it was "Perry's best work in years" and that it "pushes boundaries of various genres. The record reached the Top 10 on the iTunes reggae chart and the Top 100 on the Billboard reggae chart.

A couple of weeks prior to his death, Perry released his last song, "No Bloody Friends". The song was a collaboration with Ral Ston, and it was released on 13 August 2021.

Perry's final album during his lifetime was with New Age Doom, titled Lee "Scratch" Perry's Guide to the Universe (2021). Perry's final dub production was for Sly & Robbie vs. Roots Radics, The Dub Battle (2021). The song was "The Gates of Dub" with Max Romeo and the Roots Radics band produced by Hernan "Don Camel" Sforzini.

In February 2025, vocals recorded by Perry in 2015-2017 were featured on the album Mercy, attributed to Perry, Peter Harris and Fritz Catlin.

== Personal life ==
Perry resided in Einsiedeln, Switzerland, with his wife Mireille and their two children. He had four other children by the names of Cleopatra Perry, Marsha Perry, Omar Perry, and Marvin (Sean) Perry in various parts of the world. In 2015, his new studio in Switzerland, the "Secret Laboratory", was damaged by a fire that also destroyed his stage costumes and unreleased recordings.

== Death ==
Perry died on 29 August 2021 at the Noel Holmes Hospital in Lucea, Jamaica, from an unspecified illness, aged 85.

== Films ==
- Lee Perry: Return of the Super Ape (BA BA ZEE) – Rick Elgood and Don Letts (UK)
- Lee Scratch Perry's Vision of Paradise (2015) – directed by Volker Schaner, produced by Daniela Schmid
- Scratch in Deutschland (1992) (10 minutes)
- Ich sende aus dem All (1995) (30 minutes), directed by Peter Braatz
- The Upsetter (90 minutes) (2011), directed by Ethan Higbee and Adam Bhala Lough narrated by Benicio del Toro
- Tracks: Lee Perry (2005) (Arte) (France)

== Videos ==
- Jesus Perry Live – directed by InYourFaceTV (2013)
- Golden Clouds – directed by Volker Schaner, collaboration with the Orb (2012)
- Lee Scratch Perry: The Unlimited Destruction, 2002, US
- Lee Scratch Perry: In Concert – The Ultimate Alien, 2003, US
- Lee Scratch Perry with Mad Professor, 2004, US
- Roots Rock Reggae – Inside the Jamaican Music Scene, 1977, directed by Jeremy Marre
- Carrying the Swing – directed by Howard Johnson (1998)
- Reggae: The Story of Jamaican Music (Part 2 – Rebel Music), 2002, Mike Connolly
- Rock & Roll – Punk (10-part series) (US) (1995) (episode 9 only), a.k.a. Dancing in the Street: A Rock and Roll History (episode 8 only) (UK)
- Tribute to Sister D – The Forum, London, 1995 (One Drop – Crazy Baldheads – Roastfish and Cornbread)
- Portraits of Jamaican Music – directed by Pierre Marc Simonin (2003)
- Jools in Jamaica – directed by Geoff Wonfor, presenter Jools Holland
- Full Moon, plant a tree – directed by Juan Manuel Sicuso
- The Gates of dub – directed by Juan Manuel Sicuso
