= The New Radical =

2017 documentary by Adam Bhala Lough

- Directed by: Adam Bhala Lough
- Produced by: Lucy Sumner; Greg Stewart; Brent Stiefel; Alex Needles
- Starring: Cody Wilson; Amir Taaki; Julian Assange
- Cinematography: Christopher Messina
- Edited by: Alex Lee Moyer, Jay Rabinowitz
- Music by: Clint Mansell
- Distributed by: The Orchard
- Release date: January 25, 2017 (Sundance)
- Running time: 120 minutes
- Country: United States
- Language: English

The New Radical is a 2017 documentary film that premiered at the Sundance Film Festival in the US Documentary Competition. In the film, uncompromising millennial radicals from the United States and the United Kingdom attack the system through dangerous technological means, which evolves into a high-stakes game with world authorities in the midst of a dramatically changing political landscape. The film contains an interview with Julian Assange at the Ecuadoran Embassy in London.

== Critical response ==
Owen Gleiberman writing for Variety said, "The great strength of The New Radical is that it's not on its subjects' side (or totally against them either). It's the rare documentary that lets you decide." Katie Walsh in the Los Angeles Times called the film's neutrality "irresponsible" and "problematic," chastising the filmmakers for not taking a side. Writing for RogerEbert.com, critic Glenn Kenny stated the work is a "scary movie about scary people that’s too much in bed with these people".

== See also ==
- Crypto-anarchism
- WikiLeaks
