= Storm (1999 film) =

- Theatrical release poster
- Directed by: Harris Done
- Written by: Phillip J. Roth; Patrick Phillips; Harris Done; Diane Fine
- Story by: Phillip J. Roth
- Produced by: Jeffery Beach; Christian McIntire; Ken Olandt
- Starring: Luke Perry; Martin Sheen
- Cinematography: Ben Kufrin
- Edited by: Michael Mayhew; Andrew Marges
- Music by: Nathan Wang
- Production company: Unified Film Organization
- Distributed by: York Entertainment
- Release date: September 11, 1999
- Running time: 104 minutes
- Country: United States
- Language: English
- Budget: $1,500,000

Storm is a 1999 American science fiction thriller film directed by Harris Done and starring Luke Perry and Martin Sheen. The story and screenplay were written by Done. The story talks about the secret weather control experiment which goes awry.

== Plot ==
On August 23, 1992, Air Force General James Roberts leads a top-secret weather experiment off the coast of Florida. They use a cargo plane to launch a generator into the developing storm to enhance its power. The plane is destroyed by a lightning strike and the storm develops into hurricane Andrew which devastates Miami. The details of the experiments are buried.

In 1999, Dr. Ron Young and his assistant Dr. Brian Newmeyer perform an experiment to steer the path of a storm by towing a generator behind a small airplane. The experiment is successful, but Young's flight license is revoked because of airspace violation nearly causing an accident. Young and Newmeyer are fired.

Young is approached by Tom Holt, who knows of their research and offers them jobs at Zephyr Weather Dynamics in Los Angeles. Young accepts while Newmeyer declines. Young is introduced to General Roberts who has revived the weather control project, wanting to control and steer developing storms as a covert and deniable weapon of mass destruction. The team includes meteorologist Dr. Daniel Platt and pilot Major Tanya Goodman. Suspicious, Young contacts Newmeyer for information about the project, and discovers that Zephyr is a continuation of Roberts's failed weather control project.

Young helps develop weather control software for the improved storm generator. Roberts orders the generator be launched into a weather front off the U.S. West Coast to generate a hurricane and steer it to Mexico. The hurricane is generated but out of control, so Platt is sent airborne and re-establishes connection with the generator. He decides to steer it away from the Mexican coast. Roberts orders the immediate execution of Platt. With Platt's death control of the generator is lost and the hurricane heads north towards Los Angeles.

Young uncovers more information about the experiment and passes some to Newmeyer, and some to his ex, L.A. weather reporter Andrea McIntyre. Major Goodman invites Young to dinner, where they both get drunk and Young falls asleep. The next morning Newmeyer's wife informs Young that Newmeyer has died in a car accident. The police arrive to arrest Young for killing a woman and her daughter in a hit-and-run. He escapes and infiltrates Zephyr where he faces Major Goodman but is beaten down by Holt who brings him to Roberts.

It is revealed that Holt is a rogue CIA agent who both staged Newmeyer's death and framed Young for the hit-and-run. Roberts tells Young about the coming destruction of L.A. and asks his help to recover the storm generator. Young and Holt are flown by Goodman to locate the generator. Young manages to intercept the generator and switches it off manually. Roberts orders it be reactivated to steer the hurricane to Mexico. Young refuses and is assaulted by Holt and then Goodman. As Goodman holds Young at gunpoint, the plane hits the generator destroying both it and the plane. Young parachutes out and is reunited with Andrea who reports from a closely saved Los Angeles.

== Cast ==
- Luke Perry as Dr. Ron Young
- Martin Sheen as General James Roberts
- Robert Knott as Tom Holt
- David Moses as Dr. Daniel Platt
- Alexandra Powers as Major Tanya Goodman
- Marc McClure as Dr. Brian Newmeyer
- Renée Estevez as Andrea McIntyre
- Glenn Shadix as Nate

== Reception ==
Variety said the film, "feels a lot like yesterday’s news, pitting man against nature with very little emotion attached, few twists and a dated treatment more in line with bargain-basement comic books."
