= Flesh and Blood (2017 film) =

- Directed by: Mark Webber
- Written by: Mark Webber
- Produced by: Tim Dowlin; Dustin Hughes; Jason Tseng
- Starring: Mark Webber
- Cinematography: Patrice Lucien Cochet
- Edited by: Sven Pape
- Music by: Daniel Ahearn
- Production company: Poor Rich Kids
- Distributed by: Monument Releasing
- Release date: March 11, 2017 (South by Southwest)
- Running time: 90 minutes
- Country: United States
- Language: English

Flesh and Blood is a 2017 American drama film written by, directed by and starring Mark Webber. The film debuted at South by Southwest on March 11, 2017.

== Plot summary ==
Mark, who has recently been released from prison, struggles with staying clean while living with his mother and half-brother. He begins to work through the trauma of his past.

== Cast ==
- Madeline Brewer as Maddy
- Mark Webber as Mark
- Cheri Honkala as Cheri
- Guillermo Santos as Guillermo
- Rocco Rosanio as Rocco

== Production ==
Webber cast his own mother and half-brother to play the parts of the protagonist Mark's mother and half-brother in a fictionalized rendering of his early life. Honkala plays herself—a community activist who was the Green Party's 2012 vice-presidential nominee.

== Critical reception ==
A mixed review in Variety praised the cinematography by Patrice Lucien Cochet but "That there’s an authenticity to the results may be unsurprising, but it’s still impressively packaged into an atmospheric, technically well-crafted whole. On the downside, it’s also no surprise that the weakest aspect here is a somewhat half-hearted attempt to impose dramatic structure on the more anecdotal, personality-driven stuff of life itself." Keith Watson of Slant Magazine reviewed the film more favorably, and, while noting some negative aspects, wrote, "The director's style may be all prose, no poetry, but his stripped-down approach nevertheless renders these messy, unglamorous lives with an abiding sense of dignity." The film was negatively reviewed by Jeanette Catsoulis for the New York Times. "A dreary pileup of hard-luck monologues and run-down locations, Mark Webber’s “Flesh and Blood” straddles the line between fact and fiction with exhausting earnestness and a fatal dearth of narrative." Again praising Cochet’s "warm cinematography", Catsoulis summarized the film as "too much like an act of therapeutic cleansing to engage much beyond those involved in its making."
