= 56 Henry (art gallery) =

Art gallery in Manhattan, New York

Coordinates: 40.712757°N 73.995168°W

56 Henry is an American contemporary art gallery owned by Eleanor Rines. It is located at 56 Henry Street in the Two Bridges neighborhood of Manhattan in New York City.

== History ==
Rines opened her first gallery, 55 Gansevoort, in New York's Meatpacking District in 2013. The gallery was known for showcasing unique emerging and established artists in its modest storefront space. When the space was sold by the owners in August 2015, Rines moved the gallery to 56 Henry in New York's Two Bridges neighborhood of Lower Manhattan, bordering Chinatown, and changed its name accordingly. It is located at street level, and the gallery’s exhibitions are visible to the public twenty-four hours a day. The gallery opened a second location, 105 Henry in 2022.

== Artists ==
- LaKela Brown
- Al Freeman
- Nikita Gale
- Kunle Martins
- Richard Tinkler
- Cynthia Talmadge
- Jo Messer
- David Roy
- Clayton Schiff
