= Windfall (TV series) =

American TV serial drama series (2006)

- Genre: Drama
- Created by: Laurie McCarthy; Gwendolyn M. Parker
- Starring: Sarah Wynter; Jason Gedrick; Jon Foster; Alice Greczyn; Malinda Williams; Jaclyn DeSantis; Lana Parrilla; Luke Perry; D.J. Cotrona
- Opening theme: "Anything You Want" by Josephine Conigliaro
- Composer: Bennett Salvay
- Country of origin: United States
- Original language: English
- No. of seasons: 1
- No. of episodes: 13

Production
- Executive producer: Laurie McCarthy
- Running time: 60 minutes (inc. commercials)
- Production companies: Joyful Girl Productions; Regency Television; Fox Television Studios

Original release
- Network: NBC
- Release: June 8 – August 31, 2006

Windfall is an American drama television series about a group of people in an unnamed small city who win almost $400 million in a lottery. The series was created by Laurie McCarthy and Gwendolyn M. Parker and premiered on June 8, 2006, on NBC, taking the time slot occupied by ER during the rest of the year.

On August 31, 2006, NBC announced the show's cancellation by stating on its website that the episode that night would be the series finale. NBC also gave local affiliates the option of showing pre-season football instead and showing the final episode at each affiliate's discretion. Many affiliates took them up on this, planning to show it either much later that night or at other odd days/times during the Labor Day weekend (for example, WNBC-TV in New York planned to show the episode at 12:30pm on September 3, 2006).

In the United Kingdom and Middle East the show has been picked up by Five Life and Showtime Arabia respectively. It is also shown in Ireland on the channel 3e weekdays at 3pm.

== Cast members ==
- Sarah Wynter as Beth Walsh
- Jason Gedrick as Cameron Walsh
- Jon Foster as Damian Brunner
- Alice Greczyn as Frankie McMahon
- Jaclyn DeSantis as Maggie Hernandez
- Lana Parrilla as Nina Schaefer
- Luke Perry as Peter Schaefer
- D.J. Cotrona as Sean Mathers
- Nikki DeLoach as Sunny van Hattern
- Peyton List as Tally Reida
- Malinda Williams as Kimberly George
- Sarah Rose Glassman as Daisy Schaefer
- Emma Prescott as Violet Schaefer
- Tembi Locke as Addie McMahon
- Larissa Drekonja as Galina Kokorev
- Jonathan LaPaglia as Dave Park
- Sarah Jane Morris as Zoe Reida
- Cheyenne Haynes as Isabel Hernandez

== Production ==
The show was developed in early 2005 by Regency Television for Fox. At the time the show was known as Ticket To Ride. After ordering the pilot Fox decided to pass on the series. In June 2005 it was announced that NBC had picked up the series and would be shooting a new pilot. It was also confirmed that co-creator Gwendolyn Parker would no longer be involved with the show as she had moved on to work on Without a Trace.

== Episode list ==
Windfall ranked 164 for the 2005-06 television season with an average of 5.510 million viewers. Due to the finale episode being preëmpted in many markets it is not even counted among the shows aired in primetime that week and thus there is no ratings for it.

No.	Title	Directed by	Written by	Ratings (18-49)	Original release date	U.S. viewers (millions)
1	"Pilot"	David Semel	Laurie McCarthy, Gwendolyn M. Parker	3.4	June 8, 2006	9.040
2	"The Getaway"	Fred Keller	Laurie McCarthy	3.1	June 15, 2006	7.790
3	"There and Gone Again"	Harry Winer	P.K. Simonds	2.4	June 22, 2006	N/A
4	"Running with the Devil"	Tawnia McKiernan	Laurie McCarthy, Joy Gregory	2.0	June 29, 2006	4.730
5	"Money Changers"	Steve Robman	Frank Military	1.9	July 6, 2006	4.490
6	"White Knights"	Gil Junger	P.K. Simonds, Stephen Hootstein	1.8	July 13, 2006	4.810
7	"Changing Partners"	Ellen S. Pressman	P.K. Simonds, Laurie McCarthy	2.0	July 20, 2006	4.980
8	"Answered Prayers"	Bethany Rooney	Mark B. Perry	1.8	July 27, 2006	N/A
9	"The Myth of More"	Matt Shakman	Oliver Goldstick	1.7	August 3, 2006	N/A
10	"Crash Into You"	David Paymer	Laurie McCarthy, Nancy Oliver	1.8	August 10, 2006	N/A
11	"Truth Be Told"	Harry Winer	Brett Mahoney, P.K. Simonds	2.1	August 17, 2006	5.450
12	"Urgent Care"	Ellen S. Pressman	Todd Eliassen, Mark B. Perry	1.9	August 24, 2006	N/A
13	"Priceless"	Fred Keller	Laurie McCarthy, P.K. Simonds	1.3	August 31, 2006	N/A

== See also ==
- The Millionaire (TV series)
- Lottery!
- Lucky 7 (TV series)
