= Year of the Horse (film) =

1997 film by Jim Jarmusch

- Directed by: Jim Jarmusch
- Written by: Jim Jarmusch
- Produced by: L. A. Johnson
- Starring: Neil Young
- Cinematography: Jim Jarmusch; L.A. Johnson; Steve Onuska; Arthur Rosato
- Edited by: Jay Rabinowitz
- Music by: Neil Young and Crazy Horse
- Distributed by: October Films
- Release dates: May 8, 1997 (San Francisco); October 8, 1997 (United States)
- Running time: 106 minutes
- Country: United States
- Language: English

Year of the Horse is a 1997 American documentary film directed by Jim Jarmusch, following Neil Young and Crazy Horse on their 1996 tour. An accompanying live album by Neil Young & Crazy Horse was released in 1997. It offers a different track listing than the film.

== Cast ==
- Neil Young
- Poncho Sampedro
- Billy Talbot
- Ralph Molina

== Release ==
The film had its world premiere at the 1997 San Francisco International Film Festival on May 8, 1997. It was released in the United States on October 8, 1997.

== Reception ==
On review aggregator website Rotten Tomatoes, the film holds an approval rating of 48% based on 25 reviews, with a weighted average rating of 5.2/10. The website's critical consensus reads, "Year of the Horse might be worth a watch for hardcore fans of Neil Young or Jim Jarmusch, but it will likely test the patience of most other viewers." Roger Ebert named Year of the Horse as the worst movie of 1997. The film has a weighted average score of 58 out of 100 on Metacritic, based on 14 critics, indicating "mixed or average reviews".

== Live album ==
An accompanying album was released in 1997.
