= Jade Yorker =

American actor (born 1985)

- Born: New Jersey, U.S.
- Occupation: Actor
- Years active: 1998–present

Jade Scott Yorker is an American actor of film and television. Among his TV credits are Cosby, Third Watch and Law & Order. His most famous role is the role of William "Willie" Weathers in Gridiron Gang.

He grew up in Manalapan Township, New Jersey and Manalapan High School. He later attended the Freehold Performing Arts Center, which furthered his training.

== Filmography ==
Year	Title	Role	Notes
1998	He Got Game	Jesus Shuttleshworth (Age 12)	
1998	Hell's Kitchen	Ricky	
1998–1999	Cosby	Kevin	4 episodes
1999	Music of the Heart	DeSean at 11	
1999–2000	Third Watch	Malcolm Lewis	
2000	Snow Day	Chet Felker	
2000	Double Dare 2000		(along with the cast of Snow Day)
2002	Bomb the System	Kevin 'Lune' Broady	
2003	Marci X	Teenager	
2005	Miracle's Boys	Donald	3 episodes
2005	Prime	Friend #2	
2006	Gridiron Gang	Willie Weathers	
2007	Weapons	Mikey	
2007	Urban Justice	Gary Morrison	
2009	America	Brooklyn	TV movie
2010	Code Blue	Fame	
2018	The Stuff	Xavier	
2018	Three-Sixty (360)		
