= Red Apples Falling =

- Directed by: Ethan Higbee
- Written by: Adam Bhala Lough
- Produced by: Damon Dash; Jim Jones; Ethan Higbee; Adam Bhala Lough
- Starring: Jim Jones
- Music by: ByrdGang
- Release date: July 30, 2009 (New York Latino Festival)
- Running time: 75 minutes
- Country: United States
- Language: English

Red Apples Falling is a feature film directed by Ethan Higbee and starring Jim Jones and members of Dipset ByrdGang. The film was produced by Damon Dash and Adam Bhala Lough. The film premiered at the New York International Latino Film Festival on July 30, 2009.
