= The Way of War =

- Theatrical poster
- Directed by: John Carter
- Written by: John Carter; Scott Schafe
- Produced by: David Pomier; Richard Salvatore; Scott Schafer
- Starring: Cuba Gooding Jr. J. K. Simmons; John Terry; Jaclyn DeSantis; Lance Reddick; Clarence Williams III
- Cinematography: Kevin Sarnoff
- Edited by: Matthew Booth
- Music by: James Melvin
- Production company: First Look Studios
- Release date: February 10, 2009
- Running time: 90 minutes
- Country: United States
- Language: English
- Budget: $5 million

The Way of War is a 2009 American film directed by John Carter and starring Cuba Gooding Jr., John Terry, Lance Reddick, J. K. Simmons, Clarence Williams III, and Jaclyn DeSantis. The screenplay was written by John Carter and Scott Schafe. Filming took place largely in Baton Rouge, Louisiana.

== Plot ==
Special Activities Division Paramilitary operative David Wolfe (Cuba Gooding Jr.) stumbles upon an international conspiracy connecting presidential cabinet members to a Middle Eastern terrorist plot. Wanting to expose the truth, Wolfe defies orders to remain off the field, and returns to the US as an army of one fighting for American security and integrity.

== Cast ==
- Cuba Gooding Jr. as David Wolfe
- J. K. Simmons as Sergeant Mitchell
- Clarence Williams III as Mac
- Vernel Bagneris as Samir
- Lance Reddick as The Black Man
- John Terry as the Secretary of Defense
- Jaclyn DeSantis as Sophia Wolfe, David's wife

== Reception ==
The film received mostly negative reviews when it was released direct-to-DVD in 2008. "The story is unevenly pieced together through cheap flashbacks, leaving the audience in the dark for nearly two-thirds of the film until, finally, things start to come together, sort of. But by then, sadly, it's too little, too late. The mystery is lost in a sea of weary ideas and well-worn plot devices," said one reviewer for IGN.
