= Jae Rhim Lee =

American artist (born 1975)

Jae Rhim Lee (born 1975 in Gwangju, South Korea) is an artist and TED Fellow working at the intersection of art, science, and culture. Lee aims to promote "acceptance of and a personal engagement with death and decomposition" by breeding a unique strain of mushroom that promotes environmentally friendly tissue decomposition upon death.

Jae Rhim Lee has made proposals for other forms of body decomposition, including her ongoing projects "land AIR sea: We Are Sublime" and "land AIR sea: Pali-Pali Sari-Sari."

She earned a B.A. degree in psychology from Wellesley College (1998) and an M.S. degree in visual studies from the Massachusetts Institute of Technology (2006). Lee served as a full time faculty member at Columbian College of Arts & Sciences during 2018.

== Infinity Burial Project ==
Lee founded Coeio, a company that produced the Infinity Burial Suit, a biodegradable garment infused with mushrooms, designed to be worn after death.The company claimed the suit decomposed and remediated toxins in human tissue. In a popular TED Talk promoting the suit, Lee claimed that the human body accumulates a large amount of toxins over the course of a lifetime, which are harmful to the environment when released during burial or cremation. Lee claimed to be developing a new strain of mushroom for the suit, called 'the Infinity Mushroom', which would be specifically suited to this purpose.

The project gained significant online attention, with Lee's 2011 TED Talk garnering over 1 million views as of March 2026. Press coverage of the project was reignited in 2019 when the late actor Luke Perry was buried in the suit.

Some prominent figures in the natural burial movement have expressed scepticism over the company's environmental claims. Funeral Consultant Melissa Meadow, known on social media as The Modern Mortician, claims that she was hired by Lee in 2016 alongside researchers from the University of Texas at Austin to test the suit, but found that it was no more effective than any standard burial shroud. Lee has never publicly commented on the story, and Coieo does not appear to be operating as of 2026.

== FEMA Trailer Project ==
The FEMA trailer project was exercised in 2003. At that time, New Orleans was experiencing Hurricane Katrina, and the government supplied FEMA trailers as shelters to many of its displaced citizens. However, people recognized that the FEMA trailers created formaldehyde, a harmful chemical gas, which can cause respiratory problems. Although the government gave them other shelters to live in, surplus trailers kept producing formaldehyde. Therefore, Jae Rhim Lee and the team for environmental justice were asked to find a way to solve the problem. She applied many different plants to the toxic soils from the surplus trailers, which can relieve soil erosion and purify formaldehyde.
