= Richard Tinkler =

American artist (born 1975)

Richard Tinkler (born 1975) is an American abstract artist who works in painting and drawing. He is equally known for his kaleidoscopic oil paintings and complex, geometric drawings.

== Early life and education ==
Tinkler was born in Westminster, Maryland. He completed a BA at the University of North Texas (1999), and an MFA at Hunter College (2003).

== Artwork ==
For his paintings, Tinkler uses a wet-on-wet technique, applying layers of short brush strokes to create drifting symmetrical shapes that have been compared to textiles, tapestries or quilts. Each painting is typically completed over the course a single day. However, his highly detailed geometric polychromatic drawings in colored pen or pencil are rendered over many sittings.

== Exhibitions ==
Tinkler has exhibited his work in solo exhibitions at 56 Henry in 2017, 2018, and 2020, as well as in galleries in Los Angeles, Rhode Island, Massachusetts, and New York. His work has been included in group exhibitions both in the United States and internationally, including in shows at the Drawing Center, Hal Bromm Gallery, Galerie Thaddeus Ropac, and Redling Fine Art.
