= The Upsetter (film) =

The Upsetter: The Life and Music of Lee Scratch perry
- Directed by: Ethan Higbee; Adam Bhala Lough
- Produced by: Ethan Higbee; Adam Bhala Lough
- Starring: Lee Scratch Perry; Bob Marley; Paul McCartney; Marcus Garvey; The Clash; Haile Selassie; Beastie Boys; Peter Tosh; Carl Bradshaw
- Narrated by: Benicio Del Toro
- Distributed by: The Upsetter Films
- Release dates: March 2008 (SXSW); March 1, 2011 (United States)
- Running time: 93 minutes
- Country: United States
- Language: English

The Upsetter: The Life and Music of Lee Scratch Perry is a documentary film about the Jamaican musician Lee "Scratch" Perry. The film is narrated by Benicio Del Toro and directed by Ethan Higbee and Adam Bhala Lough. The film premiered at the SXSW Film Festival in March 2008 and had its theatrical release in March 2011, going on to screen at more than 80 theatres worldwide.

== Production ==
The filmmakers got Lee Perry's approval to begin making the documentary in early 2004 when they brought him $5,000 in a paper bag, per his request, to a dinner with Perry's ex-wives and all his children in London. The film was financed by an Argentinian trucking company. Higbee and Lough flew to Switzerland where Perry was living in a small town called Einsiedeln and interviewed Perry for eight days, getting him to recount his life story.

== Style ==
The documentary relies singularly on the interviews with Perry and eschews the normal talking-head interviews to tell the story. Lough has stated this was a specific choice he and Higbee made.

"We only wanted Lee's voice in the film; we wanted Lee to tell his story. We really felt like the history of reggae has been, in a way, hijacked by a white perspective. It comes from such a painfully colonialist perspective. We actually went and interviewed tons of these people — from Adrian Sherwood to Chris Blackwell — as research in a way. But we just had no interest in trotting out the white man to tell the story or even comment on Lee. I think that the Caribbean voice, the Afro-Caribbean voice, is often kind of forgotten in the story of Black history. So to have an opportunity to have a Jamaican man tell his story, the way that he lived it — whether it's correct or incorrect, or, you know, revisionist, or whatever — is, I think, a duty of a filmmaker. - Adam Bhala Lough in Grammy.com interview.'"

Higbee and Lough crafted the film much like a collage, taking turns editing small pieces and improving on top of each other's work over the course of many years.
