= LaKela Brown =

American artist (born 1982)

- Born: 1982 (age 43–44); Detroit, Michigan, U.S.
- Education: College for Creative Studies (BFA)

LaKela Brown (born 1982) is an American visual artist, working in sculpture and plaster relief. Her work is strongly influenced by hip-hop culture and African American aesthetics. She lives in Brooklyn.

== Early life and education ==
LaKela Brown was born in 1982, in Detroit, Michigan. She attended local public schools.

She received a BFA degree in 2005 from the College for Creative Studies in Detroit.

== Exhibitions ==
=== Solo exhibitions ===
Brown's first solo exhibitions took place in 2007 at Moka Gallery, Chicago, and the Alumni/Faculty Hall of the College for Creative Studies in Detroit. She has since exhibited her work at Jackie Klempay, Brooklyn, and Cave Gallery, Detroit, and her work was featured throughout Rockefeller Center during summer 2019. In 2018 she had her first international exhibition, Untitled at Lars Friedrich Gallery, Berlin, as well as Material Relief at Reyes | Finn, Detroit. She was exhibited in Surface Possessions at 56 Henry in summer 2019.

=== Group exhibitions ===
Brown has exhibited at ICA San Francisco in the group show Resting Our Eyes, as well as the Hessel Museum of Art in Gorgeous, Thrilling, Spectacle. Brown has also participated in Not For Sale at NXTHVN in New Haven, Get That Old Thing Back at the Sugar Hill Children's Museum, and L.A.'s Frieze art fair in 2023.
