= The Motivation =

2013 American documentary film

- Film poster
- Directed by: Adam Bhala Lough
- Produced by: Adam Bhala Lough; Ethan Higbee
- Starring: Rob Dyrdek; Ryan Sheckler; Paul Rodriguez; Chris Cole; Nyjah Huston; Eric Koston; Sean Malto
- Edited by: Jeff Gilbert
- Music by: Julian Wass
- Distributed by: Go Digital
- Release date: April 25, 2013 (Tribeca)
- Running time: 90 minutes
- Country: United States
- Language: English

The Motivation is a 2013 documentary film that premiered at the Tribeca Film Festival. In the film, eight of the world's best pro-skateboarders prepare for the upcoming Street League Skateboarding Championship in New York City. Each equally talented, they all must overcome unique challenges - family pressures, injuries, money, fame and their own internal struggles - for a chance to win $200,000 and the title of best street-skateboarder in the world. The film received a limited theatrical release in the United States on June 30, 2013 and a VOD release on August 6, 2013. It topped the iTunes documentary charts for two weeks in a row upon release.

== Cast ==
- Steve Berra as himself
- Chris Cole as himself
- Rob Dyrdek as himself
- Nyjah Huston as himself
- Eric Koston as himself
- Luan Oliveira as himself
- Sean Malto as himself
- Chaz Ortiz as himself
- Paul Rodriguez, Jr as himself
- Jereme Rogers as himself
- Bastien Salabanzi as himself
- Ryan Sheckler as himself
