= Luke Perry =

American actor (1966–2019)

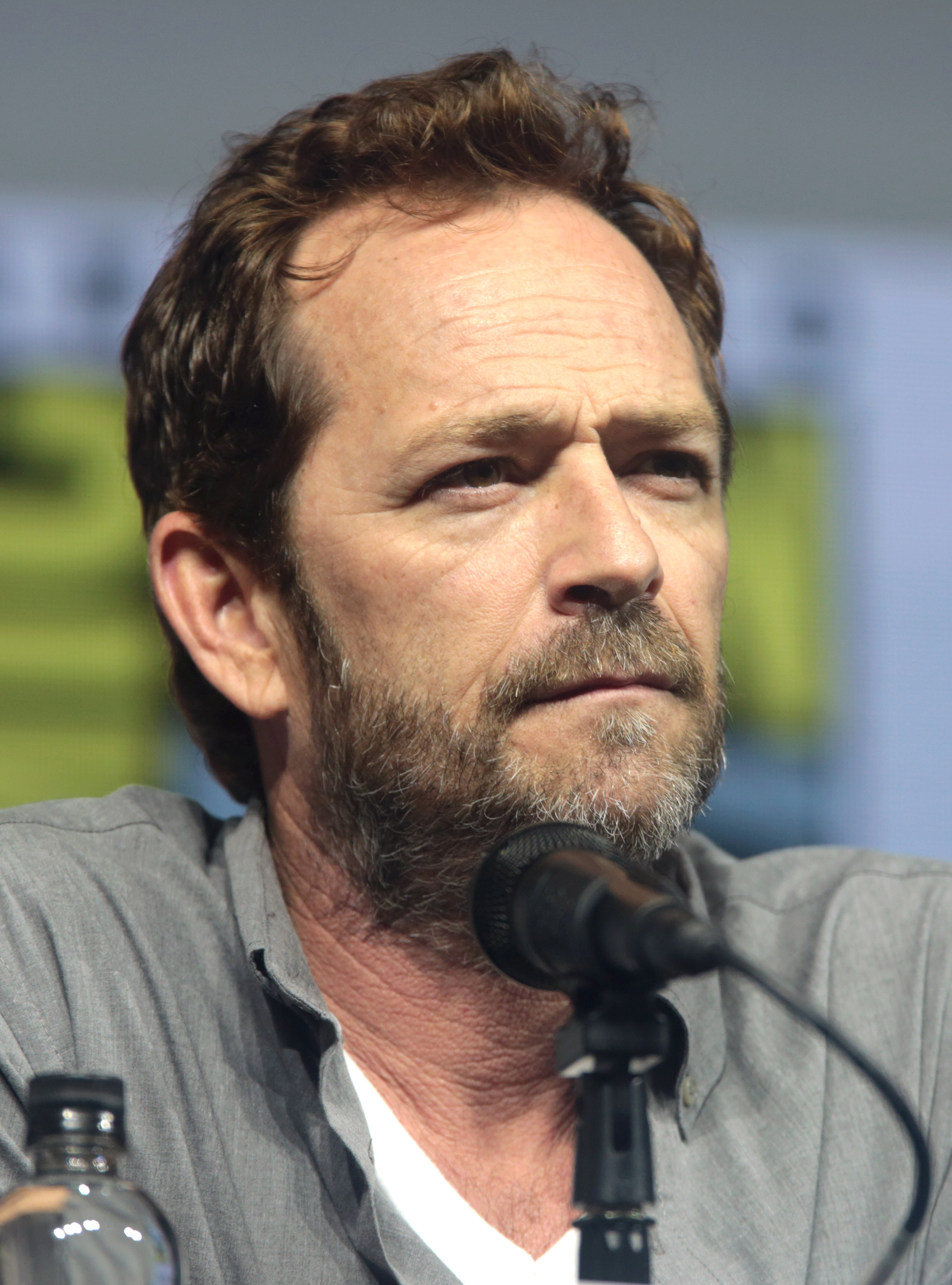
- Perry at the 2018 San Diego Comic-Con
- Born: Coy Luther Perry III; October 11, 1966; Mansfield, Ohio, U.S.
- Died: March 4, 2019 (aged 52); Burbank, California, U.S.
- Occupation: Actor
- Years active: 1981–2019
- Spouse: Rachel Sharp (m. 1993; div. 2003)
- Partner: Wendy Madison Bauer
- Children: 2, including Jack

Coy Luther "Luke" Perry III (October 11, 1966 – March 4, 2019) was an American actor. He became a teen idol for playing Dylan McKay on the Fox television series Beverly Hills, 90210 from 1990 to 1995, and again from 1998 to 2000. Perry also starred as Fred Andrews on the CW series Riverdale. He had guest roles on shows such as Criminal Minds, Law & Order: Special Victims Unit, The Simpsons, and Will & Grace, as well as a recurring role voicing Rick Jones in The Incredible Hulk (1996–1997) from Marvel Comics, and also appeared in various films, including Buffy the Vampire Slayer (1992), 8 Seconds (1994), The Fifth Element (1997), The Final Storm, The Beat Beneath My Feet (2015), and Once Upon a Time in Hollywood (2019), which was his final feature performance and earned him a Screen Actors Guild Award nomination. He died of a stroke on March 4, 2019, at the age of 52.

== Early life ==
Coy Luther Perry III was born in Mansfield, Ohio, on October 11, 1966, the second of three children to Ann Perry, a homemaker, and Coy Luther Perry Jr., a steelworker. He had an older brother, Thomas Perry, and a younger sister, Amy Coder (née Perry). His parents divorced in 1972. His father died of a heart attack in 1980. Perry was raised in Fredericktown, Ohio, and played the Freddie Bird, the school mascot for Fredericktown High School.

== Career ==
=== Beginnings ===
In 1984, Perry moved to Los Angeles shortly after high school to pursue acting. He worked odd jobs, including for an asphalt paving company and in a doorknob factory. He appeared in the 1985 music video of "Be Chrool to Your Scuel" for the band Twisted Sister. Perry had auditioned for 256 acting jobs before receiving his first acceptance in 1988. After moving to New York, Perry's earliest roles were on daytime soap operas: one episode of Loving (1987–1988) and ten episodes of Another World (1988–1989).

=== Rise to fame: Beverly Hills, 90210 era ===
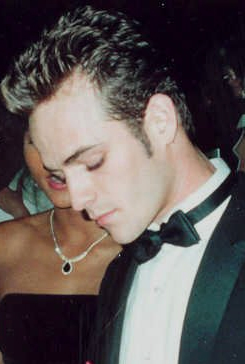
Perry at the 1991 Emmy Awards

In 1990, Perry got the role of the brooding millionaire's son Dylan McKay on Fox's teen drama Beverly Hills, 90210. He originally auditioned for the role of Steve Sanders but lost to Ian Ziering. With this role, Perry became a popular teen idol; a riot broke out when 10,000 teen girls attended an August 1991 autograph session at The Fashion Mall at Plantation, causing him to leave after 90 seconds. While starring in 90210, Perry had a supporting role in the original film version of Joss Whedon's Buffy the Vampire Slayer (1992). He also starred in Terminal Bliss in 1992, and as Lane Frost in 8 Seconds in 1994. At 1992 MTV Video Music Awards' Perry presented the award for best Metal Music Video along with Howard Stern dressed as Fartman, generating much press.

In an attempt to find more mature roles, he decided to leave Beverly Hills, 90210 in 1995. That year, he took a part in the Italian film Vacanze di Natale '95, playing himself. Although he announced that 90210 was behind him, his absence lasted for only three years, and he returned to the show in 1998. During this time, Perry starred in the independent film Normal Life opposite Ashley Judd and starred in the science fiction television film Invasion (1997) and Riot (1997), a drama about the 1992 Los Angeles riots. He had a small role in Luc Besson's science fiction adventure film The Fifth Element (1997). In 1998, he returned to 90210, where he remained as a permanent special guest star through the show's final season in 2000. In 1999, he starred in the film Storm.

He said of his role on Beverly Hills, 90210 as Dylan McKay, "I'm going to be linked with him until I die, but that's actually just fine. I created Dylan McKay. He's mine." He did not, however, reprise his role in the spin-off, stating: "When you're in the professional acting business, you have to look into all these offers, and I don't mean anything bad about it but creatively it's something I have done before and I don't know how it will benefit me if I do it again." Perry cited the absence of the show's longtime producer Aaron Spelling as critical: "The difference between CW bringing something back and Aaron Spelling doing something is significant. And I cannot do it without Aaron." However, Shannen Doherty, Jennie Garth, and Tori Spelling reprised their roles in the 2008 revival of the series.

=== Later work ===
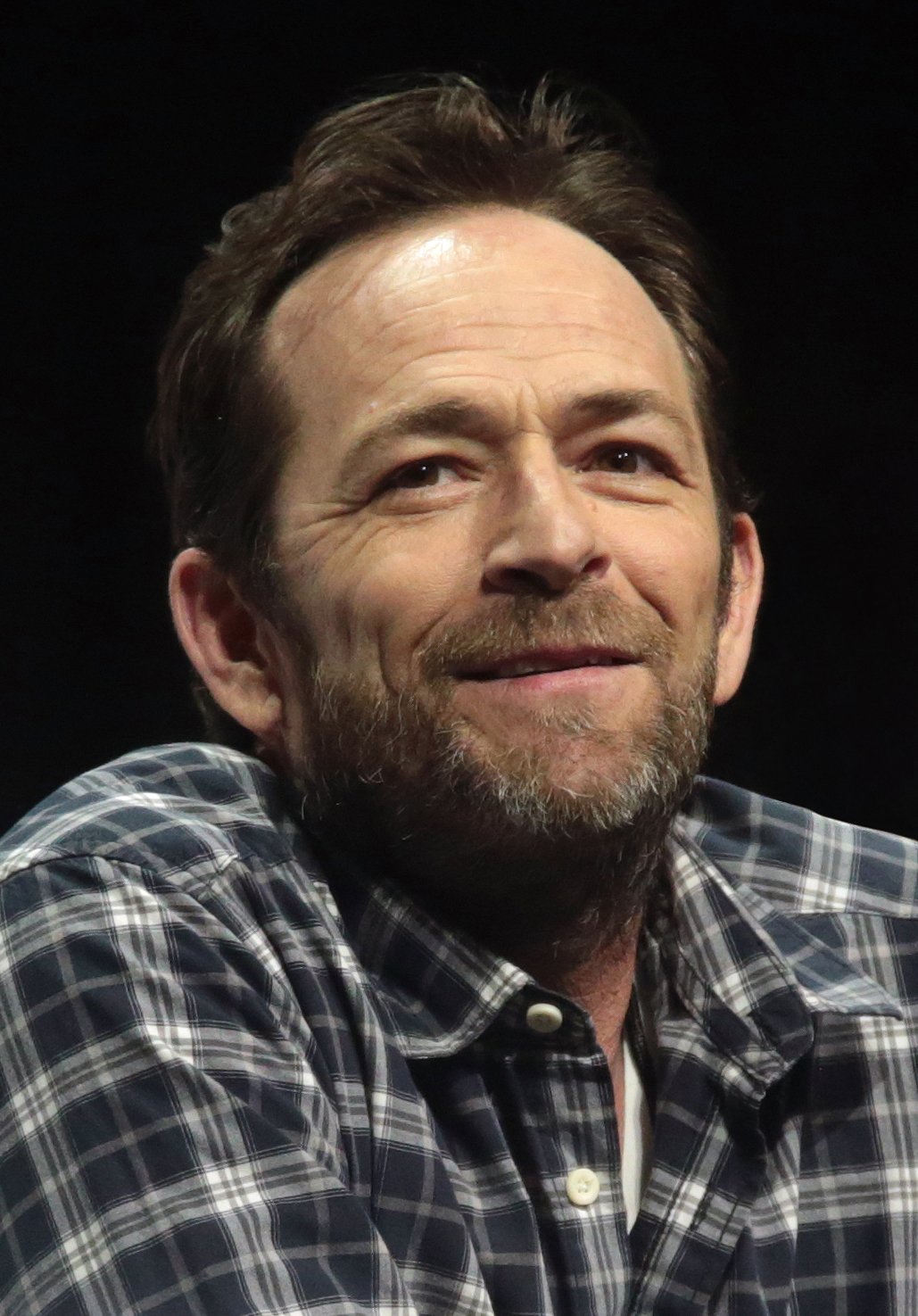
Perry at WonderCon in Anaheim, California in 2017

From 2001 to 2002, Perry starred in the HBO prison drama Oz, as Reverend Jeremiah Cloutier. From 2002 to 2004, he starred in the post-apocalyptic television series Jeremiah. Perry went on to star in a 2002 television film called The Triangle. In 2006, Perry co-starred in the ensemble drama series Windfall, about a group of friends who win the lottery. The series ran for 13 episodes during the summer of 2006 on NBC. In 2007, he landed the role of Tommy "Santa" Santorelli on the film The Sandlot: Heading Home, and he appeared in the 2008 western A Gunfighter's Pledge. Perry also appeared in the 2007 HBO series John from Cincinnati. He also starred in the Swedish film Äntligen Midsommar (Finally Midsummer), which was released in the summer of 2009.

Perry did considerable voice-over work for various animated series, usually playing himself. He played himself (as Krusty the Clown's half brother) in "Krusty Gets Kancelled", an episode of The Simpsons (1993). He voiced himself in an episode of Johnny Bravo, giving Johnny dating advice after Johnny saved him from a stampede of fan girls. Perry parodied himself in "The Story on Page One", an episode of Family Guy, in which he sues Peter Griffin for calling him gay in a newspaper article. His other voice work includes The Incredible Hulk as Rick Jones, Biker Mice from Mars (which also starred fellow 90210 co-star Ian Ziering), Mortal Kombat: Defenders of the Realm, and The Night of the Headless Horseman.

Perry guest-starred as gay characters in the sitcoms Spin City (1997) and Will & Grace (2005); in the former, he appeared as Carter Heywood's ex-boyfriend who subsequently fell in love with a woman, and in the latter he played a birdwatcher who catches the eye of Jack McFarland. In 2005, Perry was reunited with former 90210 co-star Jennie Garth when he guest-starred on What I Like About You in a loose parody of their 90210 characters' relationship. In 2008, Perry guest-starred as rapist Noah Sibert in the season premiere of the television series Law & Order: Special Victims Unit. He also guest-starred as cult leader Benjamin Cyrus in an episode of Criminal Minds. In late 2009, Perry starred in The Killers' music video for their fourth annual Christmas single, "¡Happy Birthday Guadalupe!".

The same year, Perry participated in Thomas Nelson's audio Bible production known as The Word of Promise. In this dramatized audio, Perry played both Saint Stephen and Judas Iscariot. The project also featured a large ensemble of other well-known Hollywood actors, including Jim Caviezel, Louis Gossett Jr., John Rhys-Davies, Jon Voight, Gary Sinise, Jason Alexander, Christopher McDonald, Marisa Tomei, Stacy Keach, and John Schneider.

Perry appeared on Broadway in 2001 in a revival of The Rocky Horror Show, playing Brad Majors. In 2004, he appeared in the London production of When Harry Met Sally ... as Harry, alongside Alyson Hannigan as Sally. He played a con man/psychic in a second-season episode of Leverage in 2010, and then appeared as the American version of Inspector Spacetime in an episode of Community in 2013, titled "Conventions of Space and Time". Later that year he played Superman in the film Superman: Quest for Steve.

From 2017 until his death in 2019, Perry starred as Frederick "Fred" Andrews, Archie's father and owner of Andrews Construction, on The CW series Riverdale. All episodes aired after his death were dedicated to him. His final film role was as actor Wayne Maunder in the 2019 Quentin Tarantino film Once Upon a Time in Hollywood, about 1960s Hollywood around the time of the Tate–LaBianca murders.

== Personal life ==
Perry married Rachel Minnie Sharp on November 20, 1993, in Beverly Hills. They had two children, son Jack Perry (born June 16, 1997) and daughter Sophie Perry (born June 7, 2000), before separating in 2003. Jack is a professional wrestler in All Elite Wrestling (AEW) who was formerly known as Jungle Boy.

Perry became an advocate for colorectal cancer testing after undergoing a colonoscopy in 2015 that revealed pre-cancerous growths. As a result of the scare, he created a will naming his children as his sole beneficiaries. At the time of his death, Perry was engaged to Wendy Madison Bauer.

== Illness and death ==
On February 27, 2019, Perry suffered a massive ischemic stroke at his home in Sherman Oaks, Los Angeles, and was taken to Providence Saint Joseph Medical Center in Burbank. After a second stroke, his family decided to remove him from life support, and he died on March 4 at age 52. He is buried at the Perry Family Farm in Vanleer, Tennessee, where he had owned a home since 1995. Perry was buried in a mushroom burial suit, which the manufacturer states can remove polluting toxins from the body while naturally breaking it down.

In the aftermath of his death, the Reelz channel announced a documentary titled Luke Perry: In His Own Words. As a result of his death, his Riverdale character Fred Andrews also died, and the fourth season premiere was a tribute episode dedicated to him and his character, featuring his Beverly Hills, 90210 co-star Shannen Doherty.

== Filmography ==
=== Film ===
| Year | Title | Role | Notes | Ref. |
|---|---|---|---|---|
| 1991 | Scorchers | Ray Ray | | |
| 1992 | Terminal Bliss | John Hunter | | |
| 1992 | Buffy the Vampire Slayer | Oliver Pike | | |
| 1994 | 8 Seconds | Lane Frost | | |
| 1995 | Vacanze di Natale '95 (Christmas Holidays '95) | Himself | | |
| 1996 | Normal Life | Chris Anderson | | |
| 1996 | American Strays | Johnny | | |
| 1997 | The Fifth Element | Billy Masterson | | |
| 1997 | Last Breath | Martin Devoe | | |
| 1998 | Indiscreet | Michael Nash | | |
| 1999 | The Heist | Jack | | |
| 1999 | The Florentine | Frankie | | |
| 1999 | Storm | Dr. Ron Young | Direct-to-video | |
| 2000 | Attention Shoppers | Mark Pinnalore | | |
| 2001 | The Enemy | Dr. Michael Ashton | | |
| 2001 | Dirt | Attorney | | |
| 2002 | Fogbound | Bob | | |
| 2003 | Cowboy Up: Inside the Extreme World of Bull Riding | Narrator/Himself | Documentary | |
| 2003 | Down the Barrel | David | Direct-to-video | |
| 2005 | Dishdogz | Tony | | |
| 2007 | The Sandlot: Heading Home | Tommy "Santa" Santorelli | Direct-to-video | |
| 2007 | Alice Upside Down | Ben McKinley | | |
| 2009 | Äntligen midsommar! | Sam | | |
| 2009 | Upstairs | Ward Weaver | | |
| 2009 | Silent Venom | Lt. Cmdr. James O'Neill | Direct-to-video | |
| 2009 | Sam Steele and the Junior Detective Agency | The Cat | | |
| 2010 | Redemption Road | Boyd | | |
| 2010 | The Final Storm | Silas Hendershot | Direct-to-video | |
| 2010 | Hanna's Gold | Cole | | |
| 2010 | Good Intentions | Chester Milford | | |
| 2013 | Red Wing | Carl Blanton | | |
| 2013 | Scoot and Kassie's Christmas Adventure | Paul Stevenson | | |
| 2015 | The Beat Beneath My Feet | Max Stone | | |
| 2015 | A Fine Step | Cal Masterson | | |
| 2015 | Black Beauty | James | | |
| 2015 | Dudes & Dragons | Lorash | | |
| 2018 | The Griddle House | Older Jack | | |
| 2019 | Once Upon a Time in Hollywood | Wayne Maunder | Final film role; posthumous release; dedicated in memory | |

=== Television ===
| Year | Title | Role | Notes | Ref. |
|---|---|---|---|---|
| 1982 | Voyagers! | Union Prisoner | Episode: "The Day the Rebs Took Lincoln" | |
| 1988 | Loving | Ned Bates | Unknown episode | |
| 1988–1989 | Another World | Kenny | 10 episodes | |
| 1990–1995, 1998–2000 | Beverly Hills, 90210 | Dylan McKay | 199 episodes | |
| 1993 | Saturday Night Live | Himself (host) | Episode: "Luke Perry/Mick Jagger" | |
| 1993 | The Simpsons | Himself | Voice, episode: "Krusty Gets Kancelled" | |
| 1994–1995, 2007 | Biker Mice from Mars | Napoleon Brie | Voice, 7 episodes | |
| 1996 | Mortal Kombat: Defenders of the Realm | Sub-Zero | Voice, 13 episodes | |
| 1996–1997 | The Incredible Hulk | Rick Jones | Voice, 4 episodes | |
| 1997 | Spin City | Spence | Episode: "Kiss Me, Stupid" | |
| 1997 | Riot | Boomer | Television film | |
| 1997 | Invasion | Beau Stark | Television film | |
| 1998 | The Legend of Calamity Jane | Additional Voice | Voice, episode 13 | |
| 1998–1999 | Pepper Ann | Stuart Walldinger | Voice, 4 episodes: "Presenting Stewart Walldinger", "P.A.'s Life in a Nutshell", "Like Riding a Bike" & "Pepper Ann's Day Off-Kilter" | |
| 1999 | The Night of the Headless Horseman | Brom Bones | Television film | |
| 2000 | Johnny Bravo | Himself | Voice, episode: "Luke Perry's Guide to Love" | |
| 2000 | Family Guy | Himself | Voice, episode: "The Story on Page One" | |
| 2001 | Night Visions | Dr. Michael Sears | Episode: "Now He's Coming Up the Stairs" | |
| 2001 | The Triangle | Stu Sheridan | Television film | |
| 2001–2002 | Oz | Rev. Jeremiah Cloutier | 10 episodes | |
| 2002 | Jackson County War | Harry Hammett | Television film | |
| 2002–2004 | Jeremiah | Jeremiah | 35 episodes | |
| 2003 | Clone High | Ponce de León | Voice, episode: "Litter Kills - Literally" | |
| 2005 | Will & Grace | Aaron | Episode: "The Birds and the Bees" | |
| 2005 | What I Like About You | Todd | 3 episodes | |
| 2005 | Descent | Dr. Jake Rollins | Television film | |
| 2005 | Supernova | Dr. Chris Richardson | Television film | |
| 2006 | Windfall | Peter Schaefer | 13 episodes | |
| 2007 | John from Cincinnati | Linc Stark | 10 episodes | |
| 2008 | Law & Order: Special Victims Unit | Noah Sibert | Episode: "Trials" | |
| 2008 | A Gunfighter's Pledge | Matt Austin | Television film | |
| 2008 | A Very Merry Daughter of the Bride | Charlie | Television film | |
| 2008, 2018 | Criminal Minds | Benjamin Cyrus | 2 episodes | |
| 2009 | The Storm | Stillman | 2 episodes | |
| 2009 | Angel and the Badman | Laredo Stevens | Television film | |
| 2010 | Leverage | Dalton Rand | Episode: "The Future Job" | |
| 2010 | Generator Rex | Jacob | Voice, episode: "The Architect" | |
| 2010 | FCU: Fact Checkers Unit | Luke | 8 episodes | |
| 2011 | Pound Puppies | Fang | Voice, episode: "Rebel Without a Collar" | |
| 2011 | Goodnight for Justice | John Goodnight | Television film | |
| 2012 | Goodnight for Justice: The Measure of a Man | John Goodnight | Television film | |
| 2012 | Goodnight for Justice: Queen of Hearts | John Goodnight | Television film | |
| 2012 | Raising Hope | Ghost of Arbor Day | Episode: "Arbor Daze" | |
| 2012–2013 | Body of Proof | CDC Officer Dr. Charlie Stafford | 5 episodes | |
| 2013 | Community | American Inspector Spacetime | Episode: "Conventions of Space and Time" | |
| 2014 | Major Crimes | Jon Worth | Episode: "Cutting Loose" | |
| 2014 | Hot in Cleveland | Trevor | Episode: "The Bachelors" | |
| 2015 | Welcome Home | Stewart Paylor | Television film | |
| 2015 | Jesse Stone: Lost in Paradise | Richard Steele | Television film | |
| 2015 | Ties That Bind | Tim Olson | Television film | |
| 2016 | Love in Paradise | Avery Ford | Television film | |
| 2016 | The Edge and Christian Show That Totally Reeks of Awesomeness | Himself | Episode: "The 90s" | |
| 2017–2019, 2021 | Riverdale | Fred Andrews | 46 episodes (Season 5 Ep 3: Archival footage) | |
| 2019 | BH90210 | Dylan McKay | (fragment in the pilot series) | |

=== Music videos ===
| Year | Title | Artist(s) | Role | Ref. |
|---|---|---|---|---|
| 1985 | "Be Chrool to Your Scuel" | Twisted Sister | Unknown | |
| 2009 | "¡Happy Birthday Guadalupe!" | The Killers featuring Wild Light and Mariachi El Bronx | The Cowboy | |

== Awards and nominations ==
| Year | Award | Category | Nominated work | Result |
|---|---|---|---|---|
| 1991 | Young Artist Awards | Outstanding Young Ensemble Cast in a Television Series (shared with the cast) | Beverly Hills, 90210 | Nominated |
| 1991 | Young Artist Awards | Best Young Actor Supporting or Re-Occurring Role for a TV Series | Beverly Hills, 90210 | Nominated |
| 1992 | Young Artist Awards | Outstanding Young Ensemble Cast in a Television Series (shared with the cast) | Beverly Hills, 90210 | Won |
| 1992 | Bravo Otto | Best Male TV Star | Luke Perry | Nominated |
| 1993 | Kids' Choice Awards | Favorite TV Actor | Beverly Hills, 90210 | Nominated |
| 1993 | Young Artist Awards | Favorite Young Ensemble Cast in a Television Series (shared with the cast) | Beverly Hills, 90210 | Won |
| 1993 | Bravo Otto | Best Male TV Star | Luke Perry | Won |
| 1994 | Bravo Otto | Best Male TV Star | Luke Perry | Won |
| 2001 | DVD Exclusive Awards | Best Supporting Actor | Attention Shoppers | Nominated |
| 2004 | TV Land Awards | Favorite Teen Dream – Male | Beverly Hills, 90210 | Nominated |
| 2007 | TV Land Awards | Break Up That Was So Bad It Was Good (shared with Shannen Doherty) | Beverly Hills, 90210 | Nominated |
| 2009 | People's Choice Awards | Favorite Scene Stealing Guest Star | Law & Order: Special Victims Unit | Nominated |
| 2020 | Screen Actors Guild Awards | Outstanding Performance by a Cast in a Motion Picture (shared with the cast) | Once Upon a Time in Hollywood | Nominated |
| 2020 | Online Film & Television Association | Best Ensemble (shared with the cast) | Once Upon a Time in Hollywood | Nominated |
| 2020 | Gold Derby Awards | Ensemble of the Decade (shared with the cast) | Once Upon a Time in Hollywood | Nominated |
| 2020 | Gold Derby Awards | Ensemble Cast (shared with the cast) | Once Upon a Time in Hollywood | Nominated |
