= Luis (TV series) =

- Genre: Sitcom
- Created by: Will Gluck
- Written by: Christina Kiang Booth; Will Gluck; Joe Menendez
- Directed by: Jeffrey Melman; Wil Shriner
- Starring: Luis Guzmán; Reggie Lee; Malcolm Barrett; Diana-Maria Riva; Jaclyn DeSantis; Charlie Day; Wes Ramsey
- Theme music composer: Stephen Phillips
- Composers: Gary G-Wiz; Amani K. Smith
- Country of origin: United States
- Original language: English
- No. of seasons: 1
- No. of episodes: 10

Production
- Executive producer: Will Gluck
- Producers: John Amodeo; Michael Bregman; John Ziffren; Luis Guzmán
- Cinematography: Julius Metoyer; Joe Pennella; Steve Randolph
- Editors: Robert Bramwell; Brent Carpenter
- Camera setup: Multi-camera
- Running time: 30 minutes
- Production companies: Olive Bridge Entertainment; 20th Century Fox Television

Original release
- Network: Fox
- Release: September 19 – October 17, 2003

Luis is an American sitcom starring Luis Guzmán that aired on Fox from September 19 to October 17, 2003. Scheduled in the Friday night death slot, the series received low ratings and was canceled after four episodes. The series was the first show of the 2003-04 season to be canceled.

== Cast ==
- Luis Guzmán as Luis
- Charlie Day as Richie
- Reggie Lee as Zhing Zhang
- Wes Ramsey as Greg
- Malcolm Barrett as T.K.
- Jaclyn DeSantis as Marly
- Diana-Maria Riva as Isabella

== Episodes ==
No.	Title	Directed by	Written by	Original release date	Prod. code
1	"Pilot"	Jeff Melman	Will Gluck	September 19, 2003	1AHK79
2	"Placeholder"	Jeff Melman	Will Gluck	September 26, 2003	1AHK01
3	"E.P.T."	Andrew Tsao	Matt Goldman	October 3, 2003	1AHK04
4	"Bodega"	Fred Savage	Tom Saunders	October 17, 2003	1AHK02
5	"Death Day"	Jeff Melman	Ira Ungerleider	UNAIRED	1AHK03
6	"Rat"	Andrew Tsao	Michael Davidoff	UNAIRED	1AHK05
7	"Bavarian Creme"	Wil Shriner	Ira Ungerleider	UNAIRED	1AHK06
8	"Help"	Wil Shriner	Phill Lewis	UNAIRED	1AHK07
9	"Friendship"	Andrew Tsao	Joe Menendez	UNAIRED	1AHK08
10	"Promotion"	Wil Shriner	Jaime Camil	UNAIRED	1AHK09

== Reception ==
TV Guide wrote of the series: "As tasteless as week-old crullers, Luis is a melting pot of cringe-inducing Ethnic cliches."
