= A Gunfighter's Pledge =

2008 TV film

- Promotional poster used for guerrilla marketing campaign
- Written by: Jim Byrnes
- Directed by: Armand Mastroianni
- Starring: Luke Perry; C. Thomas Howell; Kim Coates; Jaclyn DeSantis
- Theme music composer: Nathan Furst
- Country of origin: United States
- Original language: English

Production
- Producer: Larry Levinson
- Cinematography: James W. Wrenn
- Editor: Colleen Halsey
- Running time: 79 minutes

Original release
- Network: Hallmark Channel
- Release: July 5, 2008

A Gunfighter's Pledge is a 2008 American Western television film starring Luke Perry. The film premiered on Hallmark Channel in July 2008. It was filmed at Big Sky Ranch in Simi Valley, California. The film was released on DVD as The Pledge, which had been the original working title.

== Plot ==
Ex-lawman Matt Austin (Luke Perry) accidentally kills an innocent man (Alex Paez) while hunting an outlaw who killed his family. He pledges to the dying man that he will take his body to his sister Amaya (Jaclyn DeSantis). Austin wrestles with the idea of telling her he caused the death, but is faced with bigger battles once at the farm. There he gets involved with land baron Horn (C. Thomas Howell), who is trying to take Amaya's land. Their lives are more intertwined than he thought, when he takes on Horn and discovers that Horn has hired the man he was looking for all along.

== Cast ==
- Luke Perry as Matt Austin
- C. Thomas Howell as Horn
- Kim Coates as Tate
- Jaclyn DeSantis as Amaya
- Francesco Quinn as Sheriff
- Jorge-Luis Pallo as Samuel
- Wyatt Smith as Billy
- Nicholas Guest as Vaughn
- Alex Paez as Eddie
- Johann Urb as Lars Anderson
- Daniel Wisler as Hank
- James Keane as Preacher
- Chip Sickler as Hogan
- Jeffrey Markle as Bartender
- Lisa Brenner as Gail Austin
- Franc Ross as Sheriff
- Bob Ross as Town Resident
- Jordan Timsit as Jacob Austin
- Miranda Cunha as Fellini Prostitute
- Laci Greenfield as Suzy
- Laura Molina as Saloon Girl

== Promotion ==
Hallmark Channel employed guerilla marketing tactics to promote the movie. The network dispatched 20 cowboys each day from June 30 through July 2 in various places, including Times Square and Rockefeller Plaza in New York City, and Venice Beach and the Santa Monica Pier in Los Angeles. Over the three days, the cowboys engaged onlookers in showdowns and deputized locals with sheriff's badges featuring tune-in information for the film. Flypostings in the form of Old west-style wanted posters featuring an ink-block likeness of Luke Perry's character, Matt Austin, and the phrase, "a sheriff with nothing to lose" were also put up around the cities.

== Reception ==
When A Gunfighter's Pledge premiered on Hallmark Channel, it scored a 2.3 household rating with over 1.9 million homes. It ranked as the second-highest-rated Prime Time telecast of the day and the second-highest-rated ad-supported cable movie of the week. The movie also boosted the network to rank third in Prime Time on the day of its premiere with a 1.9 household rating. It also ranked in the top 10 during the time period among key demo ratings and delivery.
