= Inheritance (2017 drama film) =

- Directed by: Laura E. Davis; Jessica Kaye
- Written by: Tyler Savage
- Produced by: Aengus James; Beatrice von Schwerin; Mark Webber
- Starring: Jessica Kaye; Mark Webber; Daniel Ahearn
- Cinematography: Aaron Kovalchik
- Edited by: Robin Gonsalves; Brian Scofield
- Music by: Rafaël Leloup
- Production company: This is Just a Test Productions
- Distributed by: Breaking Glass Pictures
- Release date: 11 March 2017 (South by Southwest)
- Running time: 76 minutes
- Country: United States
- Language: English

Inheritance is a 2017 American drama film directed by Laura E. Davis and Jessica Kaye, starring Kaye, Mark Webber and Daniel Ahearn.

== Cast ==
- Jessica Kaye as Mara
- Mark Webber as Ben
- Daniel Ahearn as Aaron
- Shamira Gill-Card as Linda
- Myrna Manzanares as Grace
- Louis C. Oberlander as Karl

== Release ==
The film premiered at South by Southwest on 11 March 2017.

== Reception ==
Jessi Cape of The Austin Chronicle wrote, "Well-scored and shot beautifully, the film’s dramatic pacing uses foreshadowing as foreplay, and the impending climax is substantial."

Gary Goldstein of the Los Angeles Times wrote, "Save the non-essential Belize location, there’s not a lot new under this particular sun, though a deeper, more dimensional narrative might have better helped us care about these damaged souls."

Leslie Felperin of The Hollywood Reporter called the film "ambitious but over-the-top".
