= Deepfaking Sam Altman =

2025 documentary

- Directed by: Adam Bhala Lough
- Produced by: Luke Kelly-Clyne, Bryan Smiley, Kevin Hart
- Starring: Divyendra Singh Jadoun; Kara Swisher; Rainn Wilson
- Cinematography: Christopher Messina
- Edited by: Alex MacKenzie
- Production companies: Hartbeat; All Facts; Vox Media Studios
- Distributed by: Abramorama
- Release date: March 8, 2025 (SXSW)
- Running time: 103 minutes
- Country: United States
- Language: English

Deepfaking Sam Altman is a 2025 American documentary film about artificial intelligence. In the film, director Adam Bhala Lough attempts to conduct an interview with OpenAI founder Sam Altman, only to be denied every opportunity. He instead resorts to creating an AI ChatBot programmed off Altman's personality, leading to unexpected questions about humanity's future and our relationship with emerging technology. The film premiered at SXSW and received a limited theatrical release in 2026.

== Plot ==
When Los Angeles filmmaker Adam Bhala Lough fails to land an interview with the elusive Sam Altman, he travels to India to deepfake the tech CEO, only to create a glitchy LLM "Sam Bot" that moves into his home, befriends his son and begins co-directing the movie. As Sam Bot grows more lifelike, Adam is forced to decide whether to delete the AI he accidentally brought to life.

== Production ==
The film was shot in India, Jamaica, and the United States throughout 2024.

== Release ==
The film premiered at SXSW on March 8, 2025. It was subsequently featured at DC/DOX Film Festival, Flickers' Rhode Island International Film Festival, New Hampshire Film Festival, Boise Film Festival, Virginia Film Festival, and the Coronado Island Film Festival.

The trailer was officially released exclusively by Wired on December 18, 2025.

The film had its New York premiere on January 16, 2026 at the Quad Cinema, before receiving a limited theatrical run later in the year.

== Reception ==
=== Critical response ===
The film received generally positive reviews. On the review aggregator website Rotten Tomatoes, 93% of 14 critics' reviews are positive, with an average rating of 7.1/10.

In a positive review for The New York Times, Ben Kenigsberg said that the "film simultaneously illustrates the deficiencies of generative A.I. and the dangers of investing in it emotionally, while remaining annoying and self-amused in a distinctly human way. Rolling Stone called it a "globe-trotting, thought-provoking, utterly surreal exploration of how far today’s AI can be pushed and whether it can ever really substitute for human ingenuity."

In a mixed review for The A.V. Club, Jacob Oller criticized the film's use of generative AI, saying that "turning to generative AI for your filmmaking, even to make a point about its own uselessness, is to accept defeat."

=== Accolades ===
The film won Best Documentary Feature at the 2025 Chelsea Film Festival.
