= Serena Reeder =

American actress

- Born: April 8, 1983 (age 43); Washington, D.C., U.S.
- Education: Juilliard School (BFA)
- Occupation: Actress

Serena Olanthe Reeder (born April 8, 1983) is an American theater, film, and television actress and screenwriter. Reeder was born in Washington, D.C.. She is best known for her roles in the films The Bucket List, Get Rich or Die Tryin', The Architect, The Brooklyn Heist, and Weapons.

== Early life and education ==
Reeder was born and raised in Washington, D.C.. She attended the Duke Ellington School of the Arts in Washington, D.C. for theater.

She attended the Juilliard School as part of the Drama Division's Group 34 (2001–2005), graduating with a B.F.A degree in 2005.

== Career ==
In 2005, Reeder's first professional role came before she graduated from Juilliard in Get Rich or Die Tryin'. She was cast as 50 Cent's mother by the six-time Academy Award nominee Jim Sheridan. This marked her film debut and the first time she worked with two-time Academy Award nominee Viola Davis, playing her daughter. The movie was released November 9, 2005.

In the summer of 2005, she was cast in The Architect, directed by Matt Tauber marking the second time she would play the daughter of Viola Davis.

Reeder was cast as Morgan Freeman's daughter in The Bucket List, a 2007 comedy-drama starring Jack Nicholson and directed by Rob Reiner.

The Tea Party, her directorial debut, was selected for competition, in the short film section of the 2013 Santa Barbara International Film Festival.

== Filmography ==
Film roles
Year	Title	Role	Notes
2005	Get Rich or Die Tryin'	Katrina	
2006	The Architect	Cammie Neely	
2007	Weapons	Darnelle	
2007	I Tried	Emily	
2007	The Bucket List	Rachel	
2008	Capers	Maya	
2009	May Fly	The Girl	Short film
2014	Grand Gesture	Naima	
2019	Bolden	Mavis	

Television roles
Year	Title	Role	Notes
2008	Medium	Ms. Hastings	Episode: "A Cure for What Ails You"
