= Weapons (2007 film) =

American crime drama film

- DVD cover
- Directed by: Adam Bhala Lough
- Written by: Adam Bhala Lough
- Produced by: Robert N. Fried; Dan Keston; Bill Straus; Sol Tryon (executive); Elizabeth Destro (associate)
- Starring: Nick Cannon; Paul Dano; Mark Webber; Riley Smith; Brandon Mychal Smith
- Cinematography: Manuel Claro
- Edited by: Jay Rabinowitz
- Production company: Lionsgate
- Release date: 2007
- Running time: 82 minutes
- Country: United States
- Language: English
- Budget: $500,000

Weapons (stylized as WEAPONS) is a 2007 American teenage crime drama film directed and written by Adam Bhala Lough and starring Nick Cannon, Paul Dano, Mark Webber, Riley Smith, and Brandon Mychal Smith.

The film premiered in competition at the 2007 Sundance Film Festival and was released straight-to-DVD by Lionsgate in 2009.

== Plot ==
The film starts off in a violent crime committed against Reggie (Cannon), who ends up having his head blown off while eating a burger in a fast-food restaurant. After his death, the film unveils why Reggie died in the beginning of the film—and ultimately, who killed him.

=== Acts ===
==== Welcome Home ====
The return of Sean (Webber) and his sequential, radical lifestyle—joined by Jason (Riley Smith) and Chris (Dano).

==== Bulletproof ====
The previous day, Reggie and his sister Sabrina argue over the bruises on her face. She reveals to him that Jason gave her the scars during a rape, forcing Reggie to retaliate. He brings along his friend Mikey, (Yorker) and Mikey's younger brother James (Smith), to retrieve a gun from Mikey's distant, irrational uncle (Arliss Howard), solely to kill Jason.

==== I'm Making a Movie ====
The night of Sabrina's rape through the eyes of Chris.

==== You Were My First ====
Sabrina's revealed pregnancy the same night of her rape.

==== The Funeral ====
The morning of Jason's funeral, Reggie's death, and his killer's breakdown.

== Cast ==
- Nick Cannon as Reggie
- Jade Yorker as Mikey
- Paul Dano as Chris
- Mark Webber as Sean
- Riley Smith as Jason
- Brandon Mychal Smith as James
- Serena Reeder as Darnelle

== Production ==
"The first and last scenes were shot on 35mm, but most of the film was shot on 16mm. The scenes Paul Dano shot are on a PD150. So initially that was how we wanted to cover it for a number of reasons. We were on a super low budget. It was around $500,000. We were shooting in 18 days and practically speaking there wasn’t going to be time to do traditional coverage. I was more interested in doing something aesthetically that lent itself to this type of run-and-gun style."
— Adam Bhala Lough

The film's budget estimated $500,000.

Dano's character uses a Sony PSR-PD150 in the film for his directorial debut.

== Reception ==
The film was nominated for the Grand Jury Prize at the 2007 Sundance Film Festival but received extremely negative reviews from the critics upon release. On the review aggregator website Rotten Tomatoes, 0% of 10 critics' reviews are positive, with an average rating of 3.1/10. Critics felt the characters were "unlikeable" yet praised the acting.

== Lawsuit and release ==
There was a lawsuit against the revamped works towards the film, including the rape scene and also a scene where Dano's character urinates on a fellow party member. In general, the film was delayed when After Dark Films, the company that purchased the film at the Sundance Film Festival for a reported 1.1 million dollar advance, failed to contact Lough regarding releasing the film to theaters as planned; consequently, Lough teamed up with Lionsgate for releasing the unrated version of the film straight to DVD.

== Music ==
The film is notable for having an all DJ Screw soundtrack (the first of its kind) and an original score by the band International Friends, originally composed for the film, but inspired by DJ Screw music.

== Awards and nominations ==
Year	Award	Category	Recipient	Result
2007	Sundance Film Festival	Grand Jury Prize	Adam Bhala Lough	Nominated

== See also ==
- List of hood films
