= TFW No GF =

2020 documentary on incel culture

- Directed by: Alex Lee Moyer
- Produced by: Barrett Avner; Ariel Pink; Claire Bargount; Alex Lee Moyer; Hadrian Belove; Michael Reich; John Eisenman
- Cinematography: Michael Reich
- Edited by: Alex Lee Moyer
- Production company: Play Nice
- Release date: 2020
- Running time: 82 minutes
- Country: United States
- Language: English

TFW No GF is a 2020 direct-to-streaming documentary directed by Alex Lee Moyer, about the incel and Frogtwitter subcultures in the United States. The title is an Internet-slang meme abbreviation variously explained as "that face when [you have] no girlfriend", or "that feel(ing) when [you have] no girlfriend".

== Synopsis ==
TFW No GF follows five members of the incel and Frogtwitter subcultures. These five are:

- Viddy and Charels, two brothers. In the course of the film, they become the subject of national news attention due to a photo Charels posts of himself with a gun joking about the upcoming Joker film. His firearms are seized by local police, but are later returned.
- Kyle, a Texan who discusses his emotions while decked out in cowboy hat and denims
- Sean, a shy boy who lives in his mother's apartment and does powerlifting
- Kantbot, an internet forum user described as a "pseudo-intellectual" by Rolling Stone

The film depicts these individuals talking against the backdrop of suburban streets, playing video games, and posting on the internet.

Moyer focuses on the intimate details of the interview subjects' lives. Though Moyer does not focus on the darkest details of the incel subculture, the interview subjects incidentally make jokes about Elliot Rodger, the 2014 mass shooter at UC Santa Barbara, and Alek Minassian, perpetrator of the 2018 Toronto van attack.

Moyer centers the idea of the "NEET", to describe an individual "Not in Education, Employment, or Training". The interview subjects characterize themselves by this descriptor, and Moyer contextualizes it with the 2008 financial crisis.

The film does not have a strict narrative structure and consists of tweets, 4chan screenshots, definitions of internet terms, and interviews. The interviews do not include any with experts, cultural critics, or family members. Additionally, the film features the work of Prince of Zimbabwe, creator of Wojak animations online, along with musicians Negative XP and Egg White.

== Release ==
TFW No GF was originally selected to premiere in SXSW's Visions category, but due to the COVID-19 lockdown and the cancellation of the festival, the documentary became one of seven films hosted by Amazon Prime in a ten-day virtual version of SXSW.

== Reception ==
Writing for the socialist magazine Jacobin, Josh Gabert-Doyon describes the "depiction of the film's subjects [as] tender and compassionate, a compelling look at alienated men trying, and ultimately succeeding, to overcome the resentment and aimlessness of inceldom". Gabert-Doyon says the film not only discusses their individual situations, but also succeeds in placing the interview subjects within the socioeconomic and cultural landscape of the United States, providing a "much richer portrait" than might otherwise be possible. Gabert-Doyon says that the film fails to adequately condemn the "deep-rooted hatred and violence of the 4chan universe", which the film instead "quickly glosses over".

Gabert-Doyon describes Rolling Stone's interview with Moyer as "somewhat combative". The piece by E.J. Dickson describes multiple features of the documentary as lacking judgement. These include Moyer's dismissal of the idea that the interview subjects posed any danger to society, its inclusion of free-market anarchist, convicted sex offender, and 3D printed gun manufacturer Cody Wilson as co-producer, and the film's taking at face value all statements by the interview subjects. Dickson states, "The nebulous distinction between word and action, between earnest hatred of women and minorities and play-acting for the lulz, is not one that TFW No GF is particularly interested in exploring. When it does, it vacillates between dismissing their behavior and trying to forge a societal explanation for their actions."

Amy Nicholson of The New York Times described the film as "polarizing". In his review for Variety, Peter Debruge wrote, "At times, the film feels like a sloppy PowerPoint presentation, intercutting juddery-looking drone shots and Dramamine-demanding vérité footage with a barrage of screenshots and humor videos so quickly, it would make Max Headroom's head spin."
