= Al Freeman (artist) =

Canadian artist

Al Freeman (born in 1981 in Canada) is a New York–based artist. In her sculptures, Freeman reproduces everyday objects at an exaggerated scale, rendering them puffy and tactile. By presenting her works as partially deflated, she playfully imbues objects like a beer can, a hammer, or a lava lamp with a message of subverted masculinity.

== Solo exhibitions ==
Freeman is currently represented by Carl Kostyál and 56 HENRY, which featured her in Soft Dirty Blonde in 2023, Floors in 2022, sweaty gray cotton tank top in 2020, and Cubicle in fall 2019. She also presented Pillows at Felix, Los Angeles, earlier that year, a reprisal of the exhibition first shown in 2017 at 56 HENRY. Other solo shows include: PAINTING, Carl Kostyál, London (2021) Mossgrön, Carl Kostyál, Canadian Embassy Tegelbacken 4, Stockholm(2020) Even More Comparisons, NADA Miami (2018), and More Comparisons, Bortolami Gallery, New York (2018). Freeman also had solo exhibition at Auroras, São Paulo and Empajada, Puerto Rico.

== Group exhibitions ==
Freeman participated in the group show Local Objects at International Waters New York, NY, as well as Museum of Modern Art and Western Antiquities, Section II Department of Carving and Modeling: Form and Volume, at Cristina Guerra Contemporary Art, Lisbon (2019). Other group exhibitions include: Flat, two person exhibition with Daniel Boccato, Carl Kostyál, London (2018) Coccaro on Paper, Carl Kostyál, Puglia, Italy (2018)
