= Indiscreet (1998 film) =

- VHS Cover
- Written by: Vladimir Nemirovsky
- Directed by: Marc Bienstock
- Starring: Luke Perry; Gloria Reuben
- Music by: Steven M. Stern
- Country of origin: United States
- Original language: English

Production
- Producers: Marc Bienstock; Lindsay Chag
- Editor: Ivan Ladizinsky
- Running time: 100 minutes
- Production company: Magic Hour Pictures

Original release
- Release: August 28, 1998

Indiscreet (1998) is a thriller TV movie directed by Marc Bienstock, starring Luke Perry and Gloria Reuben.

== Plot ==
Zachariah Dodd, a rich lawyer, hires Michael Nash (played by Luke Perry), a private investigator, to obtain evidences that is wife, Eve Dodd (played by Gloria Reuben) is unfaithful so he can divorce her. Michael Nash discovers instead that Eve is rather physically abused by her husband and has committed no adultery. She attempts to commit suicide to escape from the torments of her marriage by drowning herself naked into the sea. Michael rescues Eve and became her lover. The two begin secretly a love affair.

One night, Eve accidentally shoots her husband dead. Michael proposes his help to Eve to cover her and avoid being suspected for her husband's death.

== Cast ==
- Luke Perry as Michael Nash
- Gloria Reuben as Eve Dodd
- James Read as Zachariah Dodd
- Adam Baldwin as Jeremy Butler
- Lisa Edelstein as Beth Sussman
- Vladimir Nemirovsky as Sean Brodie
