= Why Is We Americans? =

2020 documentary film

- Directed by: Udi Aloni; Ayana Stafford-Morris
- Written by: Udi Aloni
- Produced by: Moshe Edery; Randy Hayes; Lauryn Hill; Ben Korman; Idith Meshulam; Oren Moverman; Jon Rubinstein; David Silber; Kiburi Tucker; Randall Wallace; Yasmin Zaher
- Music by: Raymond Angry; Lauryn Hill; Randall Wallace
- Distributed by: Film Movement
- Release date: June 19, 2020
- Running time: 1 hour 41 minutes
- Country: United States
- Language: English

Why Is We Americans? is a 2020 documentary film about the Baraka family, including American poets Amiri Baraka, Amina Baraka, and their son, Ras Baraka, the current mayor of Newark, New Jersey. The film's title is taken from one of Amiri's poems and is described as a "love letter" to Newark.

== Synopsis ==
Why Is We Americans explores the Baraka family through the lens of Amiri Baraka, a poet and activist. The film opens with archival footage of Amiri speaking at the 1972 National Black Political Convention, intermixed with footage of his son Ras Baraka's campaign for mayor of Newark. Matriarch Amina Baraka is described as "form[ing] the emotional center" of the film, both in her support of the Newark community and her family. The narrative explores how Amina and Amiri raised their five children in Newark during "violate times", including the Newark Rebellion of 1967.

The personal tragedies of the Barakas is used to comment on the larger story of Newark. This includes the murder of Shani Baraka, Amiri's and Amina's daughter, who was considered one of the first openly gay black activists. The film also explores the murder of Amiri's sister, Kimako Baraka. These scenes are balanced with "more celebratory" footage of Ras being elected as mayor.

Why Is We Americans includes interviews from surviving Baraka family members, discussing their family history and the fight for racial justice in America. Amina is depicted talking about "how America sees Black people as a people unable to govern themselves". It also shows how Amiri mobilized black voters and black political leadership, including Kenneth Gibson, the first black mayor of Newark in 1970. The film features appearances from Lauryn Hill, who is an executive producer. Hip-hop artist Roxanne Shanté, who campaigned for Ras, appears in the film, recalling how the Barakas "fed anyone who knocked on their door and have a deep love for the city". New Jersey senator Cory Booker is also featured, endorsing Ras for re-election in 2018.

== Production ==
Why Is We Americans? was directed by Udi Aloni and Ayana Stafford-Morris and was filmed in 2018. Lauryn Hill served as an executive producer.

== Reception ==
On review aggregator Rotten Tomatoes, the film holds an approval rating of 86% based on 7 reviews.

Film Threat called Why Is We Americans? an "intense and educational documentary". KDHX similarly described the film as an "essential historical survey", and recommended it for anyone not already familiar with Amiri Baraka. Sarah-Tai Black, writing for the Los Angeles Times, criticized the film for being "over-reliant on appearances from executive producer Lauryn Hill, which feel gratuitous". Devika Girish, writing for the New York Times, found fault with items not given enough attention, such as only a brief mention of Amiri's first wife, the poet Hettie Jones.
