= Jaclyn DeSantis =

American actress

- Born: Long Island, New York, USA
- Occupations: Actress, Television Actress

Jaclyn DeSantis is an American actress. She is best known for playing Maggie on the NBC television series Windfall.

== Early life ==
Jaclyn was born in Long Island, New York. She attended the School of Visual Arts in Manhattan and Mass Arts in Boston. Later, she went on to study at the Lee Strasberg Theatre and Film Institute. Dividing her time between New York City and Los Angeles, Jaclyn enjoys performing as a musician and travelling to Spain, the United Kingdom, Germany and France.

== Career ==
DeSantis played Heather in Road Trip and Alexandra in Bomb the System in 2002.

In 2005 she played Leticia in the crime/drama movie Carlito's Way: Rise to Power. DeSantis appeared as a young widow and rancher in the 2008 film A Gunfighter's Pledge. In 2009 she played Cuba Gooding Jr.'s wife in the film, The Way of War.

In 2003 she portrayed Luis Guzman's daughter on the sitcom, Luis.

Since 2014 she has been working as a Wildlife Rehabilitator and Educator at the Ojai Raptor Center in Southern California.

== Other activities ==
Jaclyn is also an international DJ with the group Gaia Tribe. Her hobbies include painting, writing, photography, dancing and yoga.

== Filmography ==
=== Film ===
| Year | Title | Role | Notes |
|---|---|---|---|
| 2000 | Road Trip | Heather | |
| 2000 | Whipped | Café Girl | |
| 2002 | Bomb the System | Alexandra | |
| 2003 | Just Another Story | Baby | |
| 2005 | Carlito's Way: Rise to Power | Leticia Cruz | Video |
| 2009 | The Way of War | Sophia Wolfe | |

=== Television ===
| Year | Title | Role | Notes |
|---|---|---|---|
| 2000 | Law & Order | Darah Laporte | "Untitled" |
| 2000 | Madigan Men | June / Jane | "The Kid's Alright", "Meet the Wolfes" |
| 2003 | Luis | Marly | Main role |
| 2006 | Windfall | Maggie Hernandez | Main role |
| 2007 | Nurses | Joanne "Jo" Mazur | TV film |
| 2008 | A Gunfighter's Pledge | Amaya | TV film |
| 2009 | Ghost Whisperer | Zoe Ramos | "Cursed", "Endless Love", "The Book of Changes" |
| 2010 | The Closer | Anna Vargas | "Executive Order" |
