= The Carter =

- Promotional poster for the movie
- Directed by: Adam Bhala Lough
- Produced by: Quincy Jones III; Joshua Krause; Jared Freedman
- Starring: Dwayne Michael Carter, Jr. Bryan Williams; Cortez Bryant; Reginae Carter
- Cinematography: Adam Bhala Lough
- Edited by: Andy Grieve
- Music by: Lil Wayne
- Distributed by: QD3 Entertainment
- Release date: November 17, 2009
- Running time: 75 minutes
- Country: United States
- Language: English

The Carter is a 2009 documentary film about the American hip hop recording artist Dwayne Michael Carter, Jr., better known as Lil Wayne. The film was directed by Adam Bhala Lough and produced by Joshua Krause and Quincy Jones III, and documents Lil Wayne in the period before and shortly after the release of his studio album, Tha Carter III, which achieved platinum status and critical acclaim, and sold one million copies in one week. After being shown at the Sundance Film Festival, it was subjected to a lawsuit by Carter to block distribution but eventually was released direct to DVD and iTunes, where it topped all movie charts. The film has since been banned from legal sale again but is widely bootlegged on the Internet. Despite having no formal release, it has been rated as one of the top 70 music documentaries of all time.

== Production ==
While filming The Carter (between 2007 and 2008), the filmmakers conducted no interviews with Carter. As Quincy Jones III told MTV,

"With Wayne, he was like, 'I don't want to do anything that's really missionary. I want to give this a whole, new, fresh approach, so I don't necessarily want to do a formal sit-down interview.'"

The film was shot in a cinéma vérité style, with the production team following the artist during his tours, and conducting interviews with his manager and other associates. Lough said the film is about fame and the "artist's life".

Carter was filmed using marijuana and purple drank (soda laced with a prescription cough syrup) as recreational drugs. Lough also clearly showed the artist's strong work ethic which has enabled his high productivity, and said that Carter was always recording, whether on the road or not. He is devoted to the process and working all the time.

== Distribution and lawsuit ==
Although Carter was under contract to participate in the film, and Jones said he was "ecstatic" about the final cut, Carter later filed a lawsuit to prevent its distribution after the second screening at the 25th Sundance Film Festival in 2009. His lawsuit said that Carter was promised the final cut and wanted certain scenes removed that were still in at the Sundance screening. A judge threw out the $50 million lawsuit, and the film was released directly to DVD on November 17, 2009.

The independently distributed film topped iTunes movie charts in its first week of release.

The infamous Lil Wayne deposition video that went viral in 2012 was from a deposition about The Carter documentary with Quincy Jones III in attendance at a law office in Beverly Hills.

== Critical reception ==
The film received favorable reviews. Jon Caramanica's review in The New York Times called it one of "the most revealing and provocative hip hop films" of all time, observing, "It’s a little like watching Nero fiddle just before Rome begins to burn." Brandon Perkins in the Huffington Post ranked it as "one of the top five greatest hip-hop documentaries of all time" and noted, "it's Lil Wayne's commitment to his art that truly resonates." Ben Westhoff wrote in The Guardian, "it is one of the best music documentaries I’ve ever seen." Complex, IndieWire, Rolling Stone, The Hollywood Reporter,XXL and "Screen Rant" have also included it on their lists of the greatest rock and hip hop films.
