= Joey Semz =

American graffiti artist (1976–2007)

Semz IRAK
- Born: Joe McCarthy; October 26, 1976; New York City
- Died: April 7, 2007 (aged 30); New York City
- Movement: Graffiti

Joey Semz (October 26, 1976 – April 7, 2007) was a prolific graffiti artist who gained notoriety as a graffiti writer for writing the name SEMZ throughout the five boroughs of New York City among fellow crew members of the IRAK graffiti movement, including Dash Snow. An aspiring acoustic folk guitarist and singer-songwriter, his last years were mostly dedicated to making music in and about, New York City, where he died at aged 30 on April 7, 2007. He created and self-recorded a number of bootleg CD's bearing different titles that would often be peddled, but mostly given away to friends at venues that he would be playing at: such as Joe's Pub, Don Hill's, 205, Piano's, and M1-5. In 2006, the record label aNYthing, recorded and released a CD of his music titled “A Great Believer”.
