= Mark Webber (actor) =

American actor

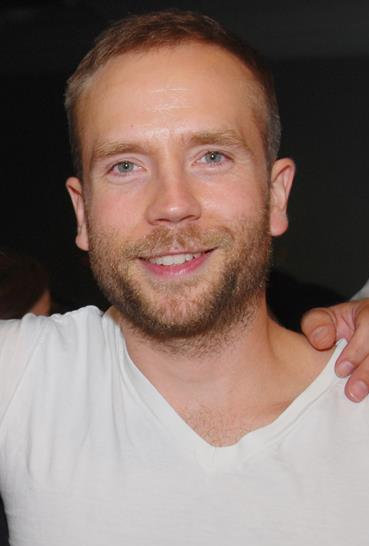
- Webber in June 2014
- Born: Mark Allen Webber; July 19, 1980 (age 46); Minneapolis, Minnesota, U.S.
- Occupation: Actor
- Years active: 1998–present
- Spouse: Teresa Palmer (m. 2013)
- Children: 6
- Mother: Cheri Honkala

Mark Allen Webber (born July 19, 1980) is an American actor. He is known for his roles in the films Snow Day (2000), The Laramie Project (2002), Weapons (2007), and as Stephen Stills in Scott Pilgrim vs. the World (2010) and Scott Pilgrim Takes Off (2023).

== Early life ==
Webber was born in Minneapolis, Minnesota, where he spent the first nine years of his life. His mother, Cheri Lynn Honkala, is a noted advocate for the homeless in Philadelphia, and was the vice-presidential nominee of the Green Party in the 2012 presidential election. He is of Cheyenne descent through his maternal grandmother and of Finnish descent through his maternal grandfather.

In 1989, he and his single mother moved to Philadelphia, where they spent time homeless, living in cars and abandoned buildings, and struggling to survive during the harsh winters.

== Career ==
Webber began his acting career in 1998. He favors "offbeat independent productions and challenging roles that involve intense characterization."

In March 2019, Webber was cast as Grey McConnell in the ABC crime drama series Stumptown which was written by Jason Richman. After the series was ordered, Webber was replaced and the role was recast with Jake Johnson.

== Personal life ==
Webber was formerly in a relationship with actress Frankie Shaw, with whom he has a son. The end of their relationship inspired Webber to create his film The End of Love, which starred himself and his son and premiered at Sundance in January 2012. Webber and Shaw share joint custody of their son.

In September 2012, Webber began dating Australian actress Teresa Palmer after she contacted him via Twitter. They became engaged in August 2013, and married on December 21, 2013, in Mexico. They have five children: a son (b. February 2014), a second son (b. December 2016), a daughter (b. April 2019), a second daughter (b. August 2021) and a third daughter (b. September 2025)

As of 2013, they reside in the Beachwood Canyon community of Los Angeles.

Webber and his mother are longtime outspoken advocates for the homeless. They have organized protest walks, helped educate voters, and volunteered to provide food and shelter to the urban poor in Philadelphia and elsewhere. He supported Cheri Honkala's run for Sheriff of Philadelphia in 2011 with the Green Party on a "no evictions" platform.

He is a long-time vegan.

== Filmography ==
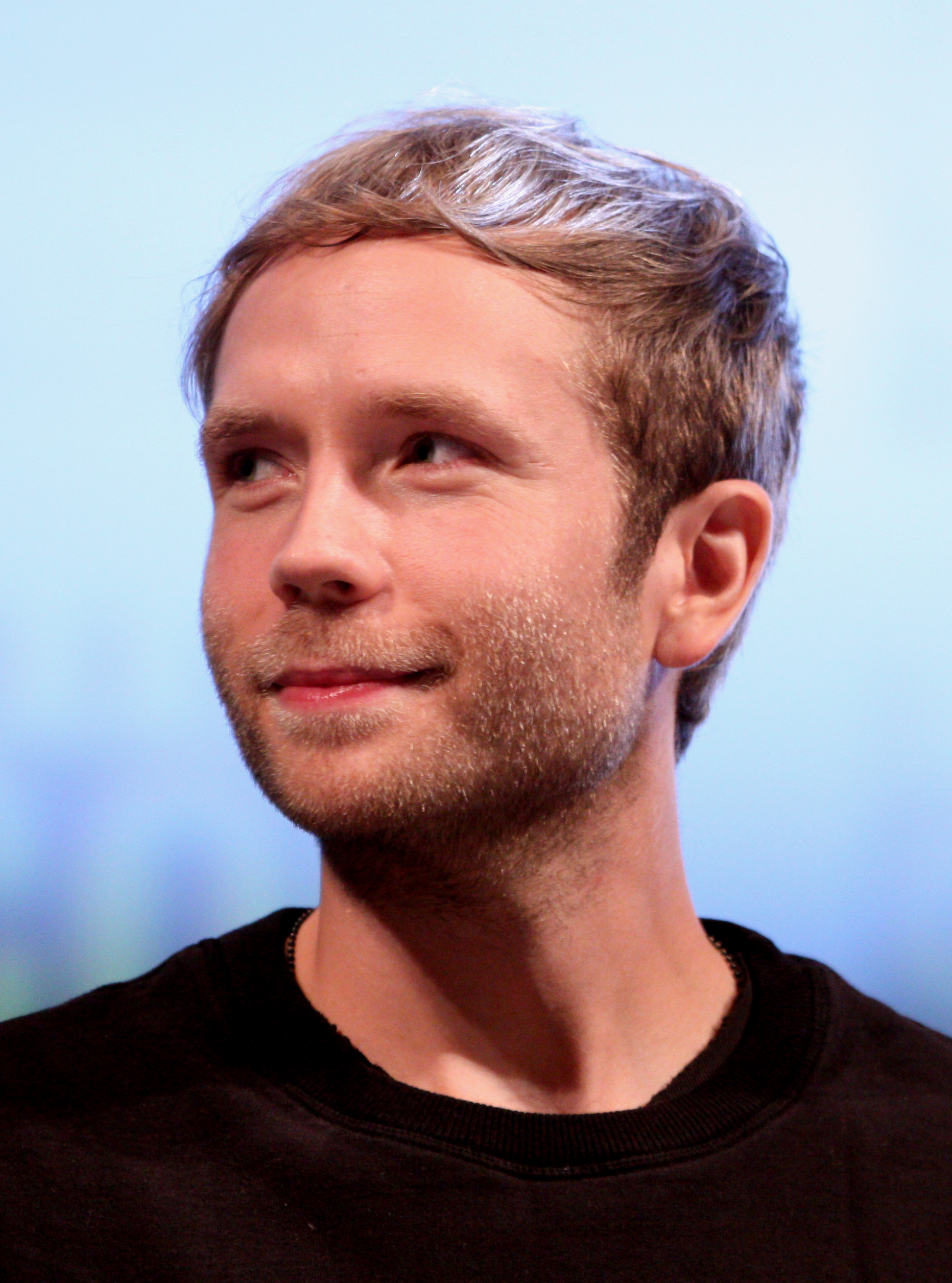
Webber at San Diego Comic-Con in July 2010

Television roles
Year	Title	Role	Notes
2002	The Laramie Project	Aaron McKinney	TV movie
2008	T Takes	The Guest in Room 207	Episode: "Room 207"
2010	Medium	Blond Man / Man in Fireproof Suit	Episode: "Native Tongue"
2010	Gift of the Magi	Jim Young	TV movie
2017–2019	SMILF	Father Eddie	3 episodes
2018	L.A. Confidential	Bud White	Unsold TV pilot
2023	Scott Pilgrim Takes Off	Stephen Stills	Voice role; main cast

Film roles
Year	Title	Role	Notes
1998	The Evil Within	Ralph	
1998	Edge City	Johnny	
1999	Jesus' Son	Jack Hotel	
1999	Whiteboyz	Trevor	
1999	Drive Me Crazy	Dave	
2000	Animal Factory	Tank	
2000	Snow Day	Hal Brandston	
2000	Boiler Room	Kid	
2001	The Rising Place	Will Bacon	
2001	Storytelling	Scooby Livingston	Segment: "Non-Fiction"
2001	Chelsea Walls	Val	
2002	Hollywood Ending	Tony Waxman	
2002	People I Know	Ross	
2002	Bomb the System	Anthony 'Blest' Campo	
2004	Winter Solstice	Pete Winters	
2005	Dear Wendy	Stevie	
2005	Broken Flowers	The Kid	
2006	Just Like the Son	Daniel	
2006	The Hottest State	William Harding	
2007	Weapons	Sean	
2007	The Good Life	Jason Prayer	
2007	The Memory Thief	Lukas	
2008	Good Dick	Derek	
2008	Explicit Ills	Picket Crowd Member	Uncredited
2009	Shrink	Jeremy	
2009	Life Is Hot in Cracktown	Ridley/Gabrielle	
2010	Scott Pilgrim vs. the World	Stephen Stills	Also singer
2011	The Lie	Tank	
2012	The End of Love	Mark	
2012	Save the Date	Jonathan	
2012	For a Good Time, Call...	Sean	
2013	Goodbye World	Benji Henry	
2013	Welcome to Willits: After Sundown	Brock	Short film
2014	Laggies	Anthony	
2014	Happy Christmas	Kevin	
2014	13 Sins	Elliot Brindle	
2014	The Ever After	Thomas	
2014	Jessabelle	Preston Sanders	
2015	Uncanny	David Kressen	
2015	Green Room	Daniel	
2016	Antibirth	Gabriel	
2017	Inheritance	Ben / Mara's brother	
2017	Flesh and Blood	Mark	
2017	The Scent of Rain and Lightning	Chase	
2018	Don't Worry, He Won't Get Far on Foot	Mike	
2018	Spivak	Jesse Mueller	
2019	The Place of No Words	Mark	
2020	Clover	Jackie	
2022	Another Country	Father	Short film
2024	Trigger Warning	Jesse	
TBA	Nightwatching	TBA	Filming

=== Directing credits ===
- Explicit Ills (2008)
- The End of Love (2012)
- The Ever After (2014)
- Flesh and Blood (2017)
- The Place of No Words (2019)
- Finding Miss Almond (2024)
- Tecie (TBA)
