= Walking Tall 3 =

Walking Tall 3 may refer to:

- Walking Tall: Final Chapter, a 1977 film that is the third installment of the original Walking Tall series
- Walking Tall: Lone Justice, a 2007 film that is the third installment of the Walking Tall remake series
