= The Shed (film) =

2019 film directed by Frank Sabatella

- Film poster
- Directed by: Frank Sabatella
- Screenplay by: Frank Sabatella
- Story by: Jason Rice
- Produced by: Peter Block; Cory Neal
- Starring: Jay Jay Warren; Cody Kostro; Sofia Happonen; Siobhan Fallon Hogan; Timothy Bottoms; Frank Whaley
- Cinematography: Matthias Schubert
- Edited by: Mike Mendez
- Music by: Sam Ewing
- Production companies: A Bigger Boat; Sideshow Pictures
- Distributed by: RLJE Films
- Release dates: October 5, 2019 (Sitges Film Festival); November 15, 2019 (United States)
- Running time: 98 minutes
- Country: United States
- Language: English

The Shed is a 2019 American vampire horror film directed by Frank Sabatella. Sabatella wrote the screenplay, based on a story by Jason Rice. The films stars Jay Jay Warren, Cody Kostro, Sofia Happonen, Siobhan Fallon Hogan, with Timothy Bottoms and Frank Whaley. The Shed debuted at the Sitges Film Festival in October 2019 before releasing theatrically the following month by RLJE Films.

== Plot ==
The movie opens with a prologue set in a dark forest, where a man named Bane is being chased by a vampire. After being bitten, Bane flees to a nearby rural property and takes shelter inside an old wooden shed just as the sun rises. The daylight burns his skin, forcing him to remain hidden inside.

The story then shifts to Stan (Jay Jay Warren), a troubled high school student living with his abusive grandfather after the death of his parents. He faces relentless bullying at school, mainly from a group led by a vicious classmate named Marble. His only 'real friend' is Dommer (Cody Kostro), another outcast who is also a frequent target of bullies. Stan also has feelings for Roxy (Sofia Happonen), a girl he was once close to but who now tries to avoid trouble.

One day, while doing yard work, Stan discovers Bane inside the shed but believes him to be an ordinary vagrant at first. However, after witnessing his dog get dragged inside and killed, he realizes that something supernatural is happening. When his grandfather investigates the shed, Bane brutally attacks and kills him. Stan manages to lock the creature inside, but he is left shaken and uncertain about what to do.

As Stan tries to keep the vampire trapped, Dommer finds out about it and sees an opportunity for revenge against their tormentors. He suggests using the vampire to kill the bullies, but Stan refuses. However, Dommer, overwhelmed by his own psychopathic rage, fragile ego, and insecurities, decides to act on his own. He lures one of their bullies, Marble, to the shed, where the vampire kills him.

Furious, Stan tried to fight back against his former friend, but the latter knocked him out.

In the chaos, Dommer gets attacked and turned into a vampire himself offscreen. The situation worsens when Dommer, now bloodthirsty, tries to attack Stan only to get burned by the sun and dies, leaving Stan and Roxy who now find themselves trapped, fighting for their lives against the vampire.

Things spiral out of control when the two remaining members of Marble's gang show up at Stan’s house, demanding to know where Marble is. They are attacked and turned by Bane. In a climactic battle, Stan and Roxy kill Bane and the two others. They place the bodies in the shed and set the shed on fire, destroying the vampires inside. The next morning, they wake up inside the car and realize they didn't lock the trunk, where something is moving to open it.

== Cast ==
- Jay Jay Warren as Stan
- Cody Kostro as Dommer
- Sofia Happonen as Roxy
- Siobhan Fallon Hogan as Sheriff Dorney
- Timothy Bottoms as Ellis
- Frank Whaley as Bane
- Chris Petrovski as Marble
- Francisco Burgos as Pitt
- Uly Schlesinger as Ozzy
- Mu-Shaka Benson as Deputy Haiser
- Drew Moore as Mr. Deere
- Caroline Duncan as Kathleen
- Sal Pendino as Robert
- Nina Carlsen as Christy
- Brooklyn Collier as Donna
- Patrick Klein as Officer Lane
- Damian Norfleet as Ancient Vampire
- Ora the dog as Ike the dog

== Production ==
=== Development ===
In 2002, aspiring filmmaker Frank Sabatella was impressed with a short story involving a vampire in a shed written by Jason Rice. After making his directorial debut in Blood Night: The Legend of Mary Hatchet, Sabatella circled back to the idea and asked Rice for permission to use the concept. While writing the film, Sabatella was influenced by Fright Night, The Lost Boys and River's Edge, the latter of which he cited as "important" for crafting the film's characters. The first draft of the script was written in six months during 2014. By 2016, Peter Block - along with his production company A Bigger Boat - and Hatchet producer Cory Neal signed on to produce the film, with the script entering its fifth draft.

=== Pre-production ===
By September 2018, the film was officially announced with Frank Whaley, Timothy Bottoms, Siobhan Fallon Hogan, Sofia Happonen, Cody Kostro, and Jay Jay Warren filling out the cast. When casting the film's leads, Sabatella opted to cast actors that were the same age as their characters to add believability to the roles. The director was a fan of actor Frank Whaley and had the producers reach out and "orchestrate" his casting. The film also marked the on-screen debut for actress Sofia Happonen.

=== Filming ===
Production began in Syracuse, New York and lasted 17 days throughout August 2018.

== Release ==
The Shed premiered at the Sitges Film Festival on October 5, 2019. It debuted in North America in two sold-out screenings at the Brooklyn Horror Film Festival in late October 2019. The film was released on November 15, 2019, by RLJE Films.

=== Home media ===
The film was released on Blu-ray and DVD on January 7, 2020.

== Reception ==
On review aggregator Rotten Tomatoes, The Shed holds an approval rating of 62% based on 21 reviews, with an average rating of 6.3/10.

Leslie Felperin of The Guardian said the film was "an efficient enough machine for generating scares." For Slashfilm, Rafael Motamayor called the film "a dark and poignant look at bullying and how easy it is to fall into a dark path of revenge, while also being a traditional horror movie." Noel Murray, writing for The LA Times, wrote "a good young cast and a strong sense of purpose compensate for most of the shortcomings."

Writing for Observer, Rex Reed said "There's nothing to make your hair stand on end in The Shed because it's not convincing." Of Flickering Myth, Matt Donato wrote "Sabatella serves the subgenre fine, but draws out the same overused actions".
