= Jonny Cruz =

American actor

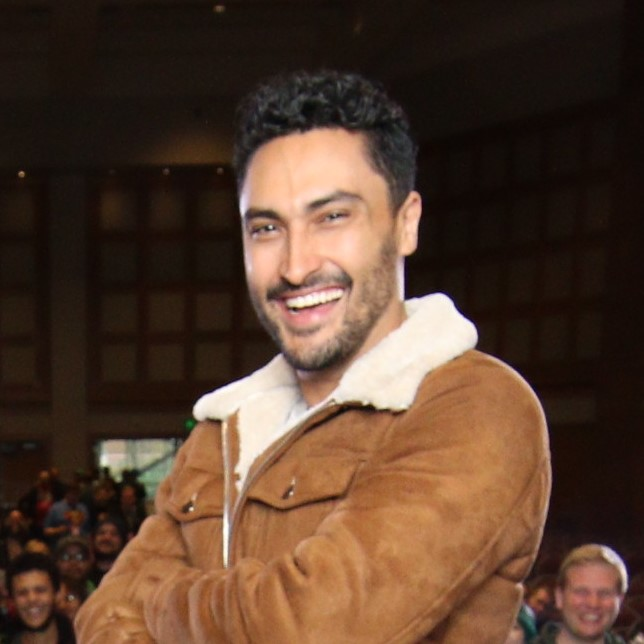
- Cruz at the 2019 GalaxyCon in Minneapolis, Minnesota
- Born: Jonathan Willie Hernández; December 1, 1982 (age 43); El Paso, Texas, U.S.
- Education: University of Texas at Arlington
- Occupations: Actor; scriptwriter; producer; filmmaker; musician
- Height: 5 ft 10 in (178 cm)
- Website: www.jonny-cruz.com

Jonny Cruz (born Jonathan Willie Hernández; December 1, 1982) is an American actor, scriptwriter, producer, filmmaker and musician. He has been featured as an actor in movies like Walking Tall: Lone Justice, Infiltrators and Haunting at the Beacon. He has also appeared on television series like General Hospital, Prison Break and Don't Trust the B— in Apartment 23. As producer, Jonny has run films such as Small Timers, Hold, the web series Cool Wheels and plays the guitar with his musical team Power Up in Los Angeles and Hollywood, California in the United States. He is also the voice of Lúcio in the video game Overwatch and the voice of Lucas Rivera in Need for Speed Heat. His experience in filmmaking has also covered activities as producer, director, writer, editor, SFX artist, voice artist and cinematographer.

== Biography ==
=== Early life ===
Jonny Cruz was born Jonathan Willie Hernández in El Paso, Texas, on December 1, 1982, and is the son of Maritza Pagan and Orlando Hernández, younger brother of two children with his sister Sharlene. Jonny chose to use Cruz as his professional last name in honor of his Grandmother Nayda Cruz. He attended school in El Paso and studied abroad in Würzburg, Germany, in early grade school. Cruz started acting and performing in his early years in the fourth grade with his first role as Brom Bones in the play Sleepy Hollow. He continued his studies and never lost the chance to keep performing at Eastwood High School and went on to study acting and filmmaking at the University of Texas at Arlington. The ability to be so completely lost in the moment and find perfection through performance and filmmaking attracted Cruz to the art form. Cruz found himself fascinated with Improv comedy performance and joined the well known Four Day Weekend Performance Team in Fort Worth. While performing, Cruz continued to shoot short videos to showcase his comedic and technical talents.

=== Career ===
Cruz studied computer science, acting, filmmaking and communication media, all of which he used to understand the complex process of film making. His computer skills allowed him to work as web designer and his passion for acting always prompted him to audition for movie roles as they came. Cruz stated, “I loved to learn so, I would spend endless hours working on the computer learning editing software, visual FX programs, I felt that I could pretty much make a movie on my own from beginning to end after learning all the different aspects of movie making”. So in 2005, with enough knowledge on technical and theoretical aspects of movie making, Cruz made his first incursion as writer, director and producer, besides his acting role, with Cool Wheels where he co-worked with college friends Robby Storey and Kim Matula. He then went on to produce, write, act and direct Small Timers, his first feature-length film. Small Timers took six years to complete due to severe technical difficulties, and Cruz stated that completing the film was one of the hardest things he's ever had to do.

In 2013, Cruz featured as Jimmy Romero in the film Infiltraitors, his third production with Sabbatical Pictures. His first and second works with this company were Exit Speed and Haunting at the Beacon. Infiltrators was Cruz's first lead in a feature film. Also in 2013, Cruz performed Victor in the action film Gone Missing.

Since 2016, Cruz has appeared as the voice of Lúcio in the highly popular game Overwatch, and reprised the role for Heroes of the Storm.

=== Music ===
Cruz has made music for his own movies, such as Small Timers and plays the guitar and performs musical improv with his team Power Up, who with he has played shows in Los Angeles and Hollywood as well as shows at iOwest, Comedy Sportz and The Clubhouse and UCB in California.

=== Extra activities ===
Cruz teaches “Self Confidence & Improv” for famous author Neil Strauss consisting of a motivational speaking and helping people to find their best self through facing their fears, Improv being one of the tools to help gain confidence.

He also supports “A Course in Miracles”, which is a foundation for inner peace and is method of coping with fear by shifting your perspective from fear to love, parting from the statement that “fear is an illusion that we create”.

He also streams on streaming platform, Twitch, as a side hobby. His first stream was on October the 6th 2pm PST, with viewers who tuning in to see the Lúcio voice actor game playing Overwatch. Over time he has created a fanbase of viewers and friends who tune in regularly as he streams each week.

== Filmography ==
=== Films ===
Year	Title	Role	Notes
2003	Saving Jessica Lynch	Iraqi Soldier	Television film
2005	Devon's Ghost: Legend of the Bloody Boy	Craigh	Direct-to-video
2007	Walking Tall: Lone Justice	Ciro	Direct-to-video
2007	Missionary Man	Billy	
2008	Exit Speed	Eric	
2009	Night Crawlers	—N/a	Assistant Camera
2009	Hold	The Man with the Green Shoes	
2009	The Beacon	Simón Valencia	
2011	Small Timers	Ricardo	Also writer, producer, director, editor, special effects, casting
2013	Gone Missing	Víctor	
2013	Infiltrators	Jimmy Romero	
2014	Mission Air	Ramons	
2015	Self Promotion	Mysterious Uber Driver	Television film
2016	Amerigeddon	Timmes	
2025	All You Need Is Kill	Yonabaru Jin	

=== Shorts ===
Year	Title	Role	Notes
2004	Sing for Me	The Immigrant	Also Writer of additional dialogue
2006	Lazer’s Night Moves	Corey Luján	
2007	Lion's Den	—N/a	Cinematographer
2007	Little Boy	—N/a	Grip
2007	Relation	—N/a	Camera operator
2010	Cool Wheels	Brent	Also director, writer, producer, editor, executive producer, producer, editor, special effects, casting
2013	The Text Pervention Hotline	Hot Guy	

=== Television ===
Year	Title	Role	Notes
2007	Prison Break	Inmate	Episode: "Fire/Water"
2009	The Closer	Cruz Soto	Episode: "The Life"
2010	DialStar	Barnes	4 episodes
2011	Missing Peace	—N/a	Director
2011	Supah Ninjas	Domenic The Magnificent	Episode: "The Magnificent"
2012	General Hospital	Ramón	2 episodes
2013	CollegeHumor Originals	Zayn	Episode: "What U Wanna Hear"
2013	Don't Trust the B— in Apartment 23	James Martinez	Episode: "The D..."
2013	NCIS: Los Angeles	Raul Herrera/Massil Al-Hawati	Episode: "Fish Out Of Water"
2013–2014	Third String Kicker	Cane Wielding Assassin, Robber	2 episodes
2014	Matador	Performing Ricky Sandoval	10 episodes
2016	Castle	Zane Cannon	Episode: "Much Ado About Murder"
2016–2019	The Stinky & Dirty Show	Chopper (voice)	11 episodes
2016	Poser	Colt Cortez	Episode: "Pilot"
2017	Hers and History	Jason	Episode: "Episode #1.7"
2017	The Attack	Himself	Episode: "All's Faire in Love and Roasts"
2019	Seis Manos	Jesús (voice)	8 episodes
2021	The Casagrandes	Artemio (voice)	Episode: "Achy Breaky Art"

=== Video games ===
Year	Title	Role	Notes
2012	Prototype 2	Additional Voices	
2016	Hitman	Jordan Cross	
2016	Overwatch	Lúcio Correia dos Santos	
2017	Heroes of the Storm	Lúcio Correia dos Santos	
2017	Tom Clancy's Ghost Recon Wildlands	El Boquita	
2018	Red Dead Redemption 2	The Local Pedestrian Population	
2019	Need for Speed Heat	Lucas Rivera	
2022	Overwatch 2	Lúcio Correia dos Santos	
2023	Call of Duty: Modern Warfare III	Felix "Slamfire" Ortiz	

=== Web series ===
Year	Title	Role	Notes
2017	Vanquished	Jay Goldston	Season 2, Main Cast
2018	Perception Check	Sham Sham	3 episodes
2018	Roguelike	Various characters	3 episodes

=== Music ===
Cruz made musical beat compilations in Small Timers. Does Musical Improv with his team Power Up, a cappella style with harmonies and beat-boxing.

=== Theater ===
Cruz played Juan Francisco “Frankie” in Charity: Part III of A Mexican Trilogy, directed by José Luis Valenzuela, starring Ofelia Medina.
