= Jenny Shakeshaft =

American actress and model (born 1984)

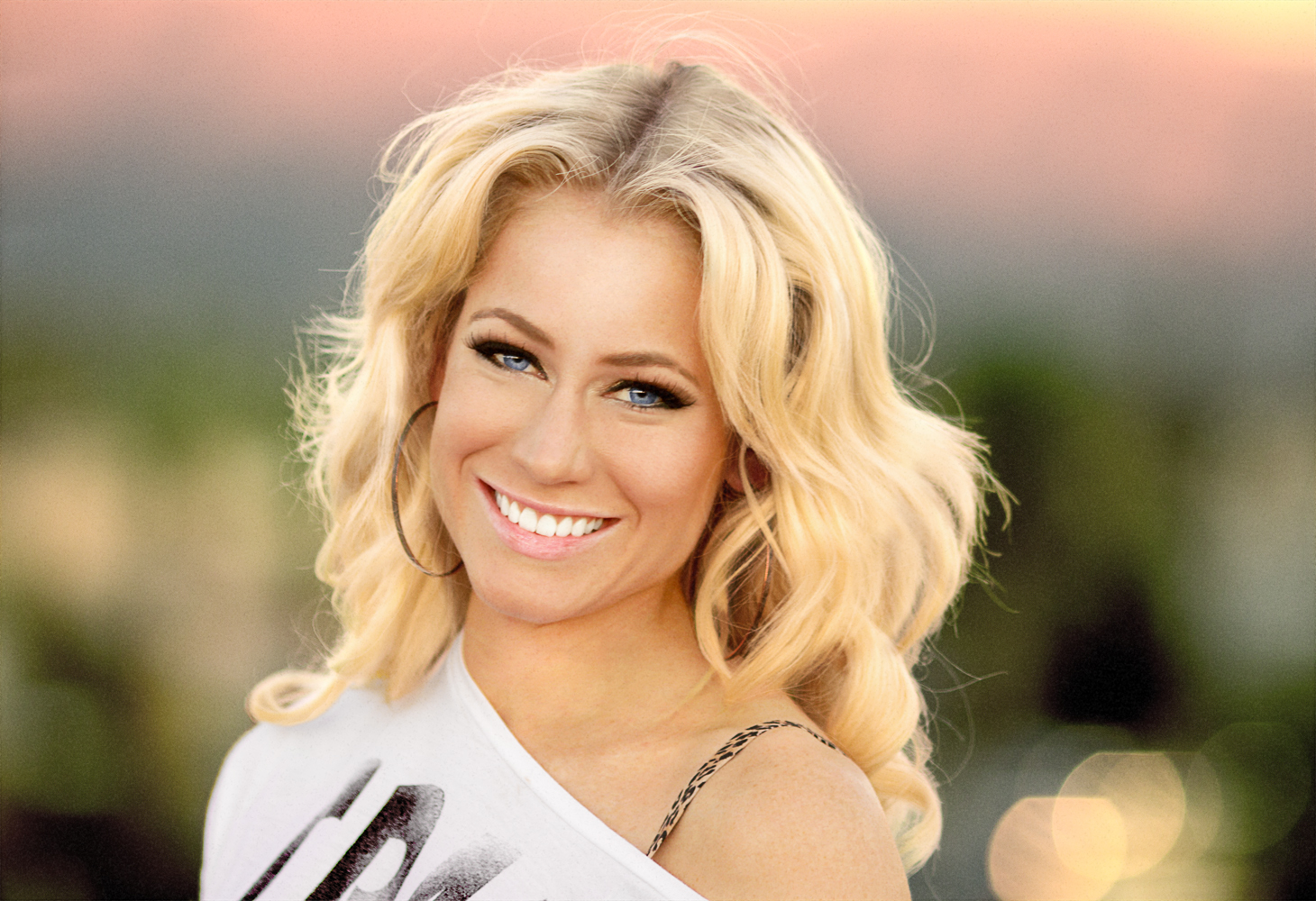
- Portrait of Jenny Shakeshaft
- Born: December 26, 1984 (age 41); Monument, Colorado, US
- Occupation: Actress
- Years active: 2005–present
- Spouse: Matt Sipes (m. 2004–2010) (divorced)
- Website: www.jennyshakeshaft.com

Jennifer Marie Shakeshaft (born December 26, 1984) is an American actress and model living in Los Angeles, California.

== Early life ==
Shakeshaft was born and raised in Monument, Colorado. She attended Lewis-Palmer High School. She was a member of the school forensics team, and participated in local stage performances such as Cinderella and The Sound of Music. She played volleyball throughout high school. She attended the University of Colorado and American Musical and Dramatic Academy in New York City.

== Career ==
Shakeshaft's early career consisted of working in many commercials, including T.G.I. Friday's, Joe's Crab Shack, Nokia, and Pepsi. She became the co-host of GameStop TV, a monthly in-store video airing in GameStop locations across the United States. The exact date of her departure is unknown, but on October 2, 2009 on her Twitter account she posted, "Farewell GameStop, it's been fun!".

She contributed her vocal skills to the Adult Swim version of Shin Chan, playing Suki, and Ghost Hunt, playing Keiko. She was cast as Crystal Martin, a small town waitress, on the sequel projects Walking Tall: The Payback and Walking Tall: Lone Justice with Sony Pictures.

Independent films dominated Shakeshaft's early screen career. She was cast as Rachel alongside Fred Ward and Lea Thompson in Exit Speed, and as Brie in the horror film From the Dark. She also appeared in Karma Police, an official selection of the Dallas American Film Institute; Boggy Creek; and the Andrew Stevens-produced Breaking the Press.

One of Shakeshaft's favorite roles to date is the indie Inventing Adam, where she flexed her comedic muscles playing Kendall alongside Josh Meyers, Claire Coffee, Ike Barinholtz and Alyshia Ochse.

Shakeshaft's biggest honor was being cast in Tennessee Williams' The Loss of a Teardrop Diamond alongside Bryce Dallas Howard and Chris Evans.

As the lead female in Brotherhood, Shakeshaft helped propel the film to win the South by Southwest Film Festival Audience Award. She also appeared in the SXSW films Earthling, (playing the onscreen daughter of William Katt), and Wuss, which won the audience award in November 2011 at the American Film Institute Film Festival in Los Angeles.

Shakeshaft appeared on The Young and the Restless as Beatrice. She also appeared in on the ABC series The Deep End, starring Billy Zane. She appeared as the onscreen wife of Nick Stahl in Mirrors 2. She was in W., directed by Oliver Stone, playing the role of Susie Evans, a friend of President George Bush (played by Josh Brolin. Her onscreen husband was actor Noah Wyle. Shakeshaft was cast by director Terrence Malick in The Tree of Life as the ex-girlfriend of Sean Penn. The role required a great deal of improvisation based on direction from Malick. However, following the release of the feature, her character was not included in the final cut.

== Filmography ==
| Year | Title | Role | Notes |
|---|---|---|---|
| 2013 | Blood of Redemption | Call Girl | |
| 2011 | The Tree of Life | The Sixth Woman | |
| 2011 | Wuss | Kelly | Won the Audience Award at American Film Institute Film Festival in Los Angeles |
| 2010 | Brotherhood | Emily | SXSW 2010 - Audience Award for Best Feature |
| 2010 | Mirrors 2 | Kayla | |
| 2010 | Breaking The Press | Karen | |
| 2010 | Boggy Creek | Carol | In post-production |
| 2010 | Earthling | Joy | SXSW official selection 2010 |
| 2010 | Inventing Adam | Kendall | Vail Film Festival official selection |
| 2009 | The Loss of a Teardrop Diamond | Caroline | Official Toronto International Film Festival (TIFF) selection |
| 2009 | Carried Away | Sarah | Dallas International Film Festival official selection |
| 2008 | W. | Susan Evans | |
| 2008 | Karma Police (film) | Mary Nichols | Official American Film Institute (AFI) 2008 selection |
| 2008 | Exit Speed | Rachel | DVD |
| 2007 | Walking Tall: Lone Justice | Crystal Martin | DVD |
| 2007 | Walking Tall: The Payback | Crystal Martin | DVD |

== Television ==
| Year | Title | Role | Notes |
|---|---|---|---|
| 2010 | The Deep End | | |
| 2008 | The Young and the Restless | Beatrice | Episodes 1.9041 & 1.9043 |
| 2008 | Front of the Class | Lisa | |
| 2006 | Inspector Mom | Joy | "The Corpse's Costume" |
| 2015 | Workaholics | Brooklyn | |
