= Haley Ramm =

American actress

- Born: Haley Michelle Ramm; March 26, 1992 (age 34); Collin County, Texas, U.S.
- Occupation: Actress
- Years active: 2002–present
- Spouse: Pete Williams (m. 2023)
- Children: 1

Haley Michelle Ramm (born March 26, 1992) is an American actress. She is known for her roles as Jen Long in the police procedural series Without a Trace (2007–2008), Brenna Carver in the ABC Family drama Chasing Life (2014–2015), and Violet Simmons in the supernatural thriller series Light as a Feather (2018–2019).

== Early life ==
Ramm was born in Collin County, Texas. At the age of three, she began dancing in local studios. At age nine, she began booking roles in indies and shorts. She has appeared in nationwide commercials for Hasbro and Dell Computers. She was featured on the May and June issues of American Girl in 2002. Ramm moved to Los Angeles at age 11 with her mother; her father and brother stayed behind in Texas for the first few years.

== Career ==
After moving to Los Angeles, Ramm booked guest roles on CSI: Crime Scene Investigation and Yes, Dear, and landed the role of Brittany Loud in the 2005 film Flightplan. She appeared in the 2005 film Yours, Mine & Ours. The same year, Ramm was cast as a younger version of Jennifer Aniston's character in Rumor Has It..., and while her scenes did not make the final cut after the script was rewritten, she can be seen in various still photographs throughout the film.

In 2006, she appeared in X-Men: The Last Stand as the young Jean Grey. In 2007, Ramm was in the movie Mr. Blue Sky as Jessica Green, and appeared as Samantha Jensen in Walking Tall: Lone Justice. In 2007, she also appeared as the young Carine in the feature film Into the Wild, and in the role of Gwen Tennyson in the television film Ben 10: Race Against Time.

From 2007 to 2008, Ramm appeared in a recurring role on the series Without a Trace, and again in a 2009 episode of iCarly with her real-life friend Miranda Cosgrove. Ramm appeared in the 2010 French horror film Rubber as Fiona. In 2011, Ramm was featured in the MTV television film Worst. Prom. Ever., and portrayed victim Jessica Hamilton in the video game L.A. Noire. In 2012, Ramm was cast in the film Disconnect playing the character of Jason Bateman's daughter.

In 2013, Ramm was cast in a main role on the ABC Family drama Chasing Life, playing Brenna Carver, the younger sister of the lead character played by Italia Ricci. In 2015 she was cast as the witch Ariane who appeared in two episodes of The Originals.

== Personal life ==
On April 1, 2023, Ramm married producer Pete Williams. In March 2024, the couple welcomed their first child, a daughter. In July 2026, Ramm revealed that they are expecting their second child.

== Filmography ==
=== Film ===
Year	Title	Role	Notes
2002	Slap Her... She's French	Little Starla Grady	
2004	Seventy-8	April Rowlands	
2005	Flightplan	Brittany Loud	
2005	Yours, Mine & Ours	Kelly Beardsley	
2006	X-Men: The Last Stand	Young Jean Grey	
2007	Walking Tall: The Payback	Samantha Jensen	Direct-to-video film
2007	Into the Wild	Carine McCandless – age 11	
2007	Walking Tall: Lone Justice	Samantha Jensen	Direct-to-video film
2007	Mr. Blue Sky	Jessica Green	
2009	Just Peck	Michelle	
2010	Skateland	Mary Wheeler	
2010	Rubber	Teenage Fiona	
2010	Almost Kings	Kallea	
2011	Red State	Maggie	
2012	Disconnect	Abby Boyd	
2013	Complicity	Lacy	
2014	Cowgirls 'n Angels: Dakota's Summer	Dakota Rose	
2015	ImagiGARY	Sarah	
2015	Victor	Sherry	
2018	Seven in Heaven	June	
2018	Pimp	Nikki	
2018	Banana Split	Sally	Direct-to-video film
2021	Mark, Mary & Some Other People	Alexandra	

=== Television ===
Year	Title	Role	Notes
2004	CSI: Crime Scene Investigation	Emily	Episode: "Turn of the Screws"
2004	Yes, Dear	Georgia	Episode: "Couples Therapy"
2005	Catscratch	Caitlin #1	Voice, 2 episodes
2005–2006	CSI: Miami	Jennifer Wilson – Age 9	2 episodes
2006	Grey's Anatomy	Shannon	Episode: "Time Has Come Today"
2007	ER	Tasha	Episode: "Crisis of Conscience"
2007	Ben 10: Race Against Time	Gwen Tennyson	Television film
2007–2008	Without a Trace	Jen Long	Recurring role; 6 episodes
2008	Eleventh Hour	Emily Stanner	Episode: "Agro"
2009	The New 20's	Kayla	Television short
2009	The Unit	Amber	Episode: "Hill 60"
2009	iCarly	Missy Robinson	Episode: "iReunite with Missy"
2009	Hawthorne	Devon	Episode: "Trust Me"
2009	Three Rivers	Megan O'Leary	Episode: "Where We Lie"
2010	The Odds	Molly Cooper	Television film
2010	Bond of Silence	Jordan	Television film
2010	Lie to Me	Amy	Episode: "Darkness and Light"
2010	NCIS: Los Angeles	Amanda	Episode: "Little Angels"
2011	Worst. Prom. Ever.	Heather Spencer	Television film
2011	The Protector	Madison	Episode: "Class"
2012	The Mentalist	Liesl Braddock	Episode: "Ruddy Cheeks"
2013	Nikita	Helen Collins	Episode: "Broken Home"
2014–2015	Chasing Life	Brenna Carver	Main role
2016	The Originals	Ariane	2 episodes
2016	Mistresses	Stacey North	2 episodes
2016	Good Girls Revolt	Marybeth	Episode: "The Folo"
2016	Notorious	Maya Hartman	2 episodes
2018–2019	Light as a Feather	Violet Simmons	Main role
2019	The Good Doctor	Tara	Episode: "SFAD"

=== Video game ===
- L.A. Noire (2011), as Jessica Hamilton (voice role)
