= Arlen Escarpeta =

Belizean-American actor

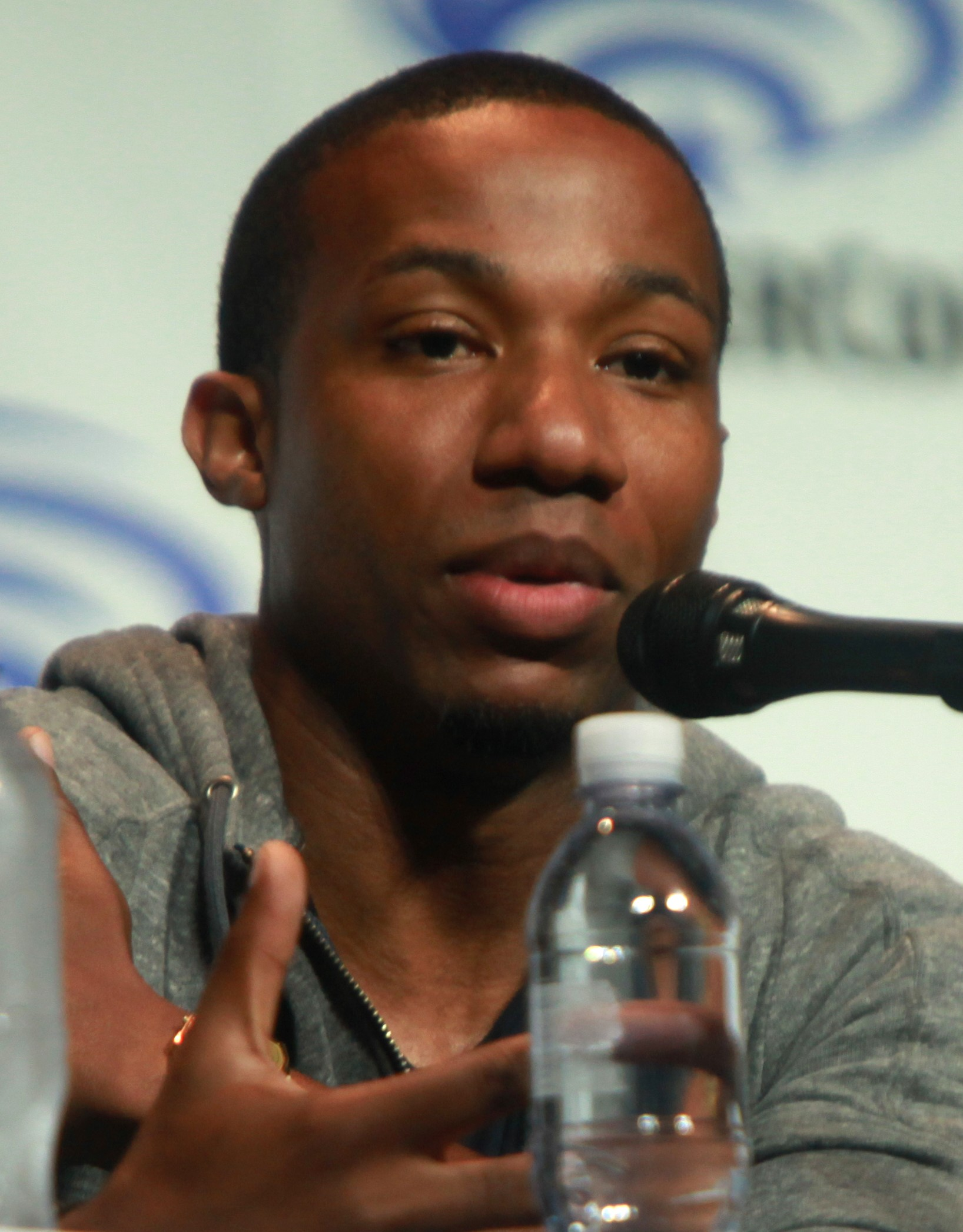
- Escarpeta at WonderCon 2014.
- Born: Arlen Alexander Escarpeta; 1981 or 1982 (age 44–45); Belize
- Citizenship: Belize; U.S.
- Occupation: Actor
- Years active: 2000–present
- Spouses: Benita Nall (m. 2011; div. 2012) LaToya Tonodeo (m. 2025)

Arlen Alexander Escarpeta (born 1981 or 1982) is a Belizean and American actor. He originally gained recognition for his main role as Samuel "Sam" Walker on the NBC television series American Dreams (2002–2005), and had his breakthrough in cinema, portraying the character of Nathan Sears in Final Destination 5 (2011).

== Early life and career ==
Arlen Escarpeta was born in Belize, and moved to the United States along with his mother and his sister, soon after his father died in Belize. The family settled in Inglewood, and later moved to Los Angeles.

Escarpeta began exploring acting when he was 10 years old, playing the main role of William Shakespeare's Hamlet. Upon graduating from college, he began to pursue his career, earning his first role in 2000, when he joined the cast of The Playaz Court, a movie by Greg Morgan. In the following years, Escarpeta appeared in various television programs such as Boston Public, The Shield, Judging Amy and Boomtownand, in 2002, he got a role in High Crimes. That same year, Escarpeta was cast as Sam Walker in the historical drama series American Dreams, which aired on NBC.

He began having more recurrent characters, portraying college football player Reggie Oliver in the biographical film We Are Marshall (2006) and achieving the supporting role in the slasher film Friday the 13th (2009). In the 2010s, Escarpeta starred in the films Brotherhood (2010), and Into the Storm (2014). He also portrayed singer Bobby Brown in the Lifetime television film Whitney (2015) and led the main role of Crackle series The Oath (2018) as Officer Damon Byrd.

Escarpeta had a breakthrough role in Final Destination 5 (2011), where he portrayed Nathan Sears. He subsequently dubbed the character in the Latin Spanish film version. FD5 was the fifth film in the horror franchise, and was featured in 3D.

In November 2011, he made an appearance on The CW's The Secret Circle. He later appeared in an episode of FOX's House (2012), NBC's Grimm (2014), and CBS' Extant (2014).

In the 2020s, Escarpeta returned to playing main roles, including as Adult JG on season 2 of the OWN series David Makes Man (2021) and Zeke Wallace on the NBC series Found (2023–2025).

== Personal life ==
Escarpeta often visits his native country of Belize, where his grandmother still lives, working in the training of boxers. He considers his Belizean heritage as foundational in his life and admires Belize's demographic diversity and multilingualism. He has also stated that, in Belize, while English is the official language, others like Spanish and Belizean Creole are widely spoken. Escarpeta, who is fluent in Spanish, said that he had to adapt to only using English when he moved with his mother and sister to the United States.

Escarpeta married American actress LaToya Tonodeo in June 2025, at a private ceremony in Laguna Niguel, California.

== Filmography ==
=== Film and TV Movies ===
Year	Film	Role	Notes
2000	The Playaz Court	Reggie	
2002	High Crimes	Guard #2	
2005	American Gun	Jay	
2006	The Substance of Things Hoped For	Patrolman Powers	
2006	We Are Marshall	Reggie Oliver	
2007	The Ten	Todd Jaffe	
2009	Dough Boys	Corey	
2009	Friday the 13th	Lawrence	
2010	Brotherhood	Mike	
2010	Privileged	Deshaun	Video
2011	Midnight Son	Russell	
2011	Final Destination 5	Nathan Sears	
2013	Star Trek Into Darkness	Additional Voices (voice)	
2013	Crystal Lake Memories: The Complete History of Friday the 13th	Himself	Documentary film
2014	Frenzy	Marcus	Short
2014	Into the Storm	Daryl	
2015	Whitney	Bobby Brown	TV movie
2016	Wolves at the Door	Officer	
2017	Question 50	Landry	Short

=== Television ===
Year	Title	Role	Notes
2000	Boston Public	Scott	Episode: "Chapter One"
2001	Judging Amy	Driver	Episode: "Look Closer"
2002	The Shield	Sonny	Episode: "Circles"
2002	Boomtown	Cantrel LaFontaine	Episode: "Pilot"
2002–2005	American Dreams	Samuel "Sam" Walker	Main cast
2005	ER	Adrian	Episode: "Refusal of Care"
2005	Judging Amy	Anhel	Episode: "Getting Out"
2005	Cold Case	Clyde Taylor	Episode: "Colors"
2006	7th Heaven	Detention Student #2	Episode: "The Magic of Gershwin"
2007	Without a Trace	Peter Taha	Episode: "Lost Boy"
2007	Law & Order: Special Victims Unit	Ezra Odami	Episode: "Fight"
2009	Mental	Lt. Clay Jefferson	Episode: "Lines in the Sand"
2011	The Secret Circle	Holden Glaser	Episode: "Balcoin"
2011	NCIS: Los Angeles	Chester Wilkins	Episode: "Higher Power"
2011	David Tutera's CELEBrations	Himself	Episode: "Hollywood Glam Bride"
2012	House	Private Brant Macklin	Episode: "Blowing the Whistle"
2012	The Client List	Bobby Burnett	Episode: "Ring True"
2014	Extant	Tim Dawkins	Episode: "Wish You Were Here"
2014	Grimm	Clay Pittman	Episode: "The Last Fight"
2015	NCIS	Randall White	Episode: "The Enemy Within"
2017	Bronzeville	Himself	Episode: "6, 42, 63"
2017–2018	The Magicians	Prince Ess	Recurring cast: season 2-3
2018	The Oath	Damon Boyd	Main cast: season 1
2018	S.W.A.T	Devlin	Episode: "S.O.S." & "Inheritance"
2019	I Am the Night	Xander	Recurring cast
2021	David Makes Man	Adult JG	Main cast: season 2
2023–2025	Found	Zeke Wallace	Main cast

== See also ==
- List of Afro-Latinos
