= Julie Mond =

American actress

Julie Mond is an American actress. She is known for her lead role as Ellen Barlow/Davis in the 2011 Hallmark Channel TV movies Love Begins and Love's Everlasting Courage—two of the twelve movies in the Love Comes Softly franchise. Mond played Moira Parker on the final season of House, and established the role of Dr. Lisa Niles on the daily soap opera General Hospital.

== Early life ==
Born in Long Island New York and raised on Long Island, Mond moved to New York City, graduating from Barnard College. While in college, Mond appeared in commercials, theater, and studied acting. After graduation, Mond moved to Los Angeles.

== Career ==
She has appeared in several guest starring television roles, including CSI: NY, Cold Case, CSI: Miami, Ironside, Tell Me You Love Me and House. Mond had roles in films Something New (2006), Exit Speed (2008), Rest Stop: Don’t Look Back (2008), and Snake and Mongoose (2013).

Mond has appeared in several comedy sketches featured on the Funny or Die website.

== Personal life ==
In her free time, Mond volunteers at the non-profit organization Young Storytellers in Los Angeles.

== Filmography ==
Film
Year	Title	Role	Notes
2004	Approaching Heaven	Kate	
2005	Ground Control	The Goth Chick	Short film
2006	Something New	Penelope	
2008	Exit Speed	Corporal Merideth Cole	
2008	Grave Misconduct	Angela Drown	TV movie
2008	Rest Stop: Don't Look Back	Nicole	
2009	Hangman	Jonette	
2010	The Geniuses	Tanya Progresso	TV movie
2011	Fugue	Sadie	
2011	Negative Space	Rachel Axelrod	
2011	Love Begins	Ellen	TV movie
2011	Love's Everlasting Courage	Ellen	TV movie
2011	Priest	Wife	
2012	Strawberry Summer (Hallmark name) Easy Heart (Pixl name)	Beth Landon	
2012	Trauma Team	Vanessa Herrera	
2012	Shooting Chris	Julie Schwartz	Completed
2013	Finding Neighbors	Sherrie	
2013	Autumn Wanderer	Megan	
2013	Sensitive Men	Kristy	TV movie
2013	Snake and Mongoose	Wendy	
2014	Lust for Love	Cutie	
2014	White Dwarf	Julie	
2014	Lust for Love	Cutie	
2016	Missed Connections	Margo	

Television
Year	Title	Role	Notes
2005	CSI: NY	Abby Kirhoffer	Episode: "YoungBlood"
2006	Cold Case	Landon Ridgely (1968)	Episode: "Debut"
2007	Tell Me You Love Me	Nicole	
2009	General Hospital	Lisa Niles # 1	12 episodes
2010	CSI: Miami	Christie Cavanaugh	Episode: "Blood Sugar"
2012	House	Moira Parker	Episode: "Chase"
2013	Ironside	Dr. Megan Ryder	Episode: "Pentimento"
