= Ski Patrol (1990 film) =

- Theatrical release poster
- Directed by: Richard Correll
- Screenplay by: Steven Long Mitchell; Craig W. Van Sickle
- Story by: Steven Long Mitchell; Craig W. Van Sickle; Wink Roberts
- Produced by: Paul Maslansky
- Starring: Roger Rose; Yvette Nipar; Ray Walston; Martin Mull
- Cinematography: John M. Stephens
- Edited by: Scott K. Wallace
- Music by: Bruce Miller
- Production company: Epic Productions
- Distributed by: Triumph Films
- Release date: January 12, 1990
- Running time: 91 minutes
- Country: United States
- Language: English
- Box office: $8.5 million

Ski Patrol is a 1990 American comedy film directed by Richard Correll and starring Roger Rose, Yvette Nipar, Paul Feig, T. K. Carter, Leslie Jordan, George Lopez, Ray Walston, and Martin Mull.

== Synopsis ==
The film tells about some ski school instructors who ally with an evil land developer to try to sabotage the ski patrol and convince the Forest Service to cancel the owner's lease on the ski area. At the end, though, the leader of the Forest Service recognizes the evil ski school's scheme and everything backfires.

== Cast ==
- Roger Rose as Jerry Cramer
- Yvette Nipar as Ellen
- T.K. Carter as Iceman
- Leslie Jordan as Murray, director of the operation
- Paul Feig as Stanley
- Sean Gregory Sullivan as Suicide, a "heavy metal rocker" harassing skiers
- Tess Foltyn as Tiana
- George Lopez as Eddie Martinez
- Corby Timbrook as Lance Finkmayer
- Steve Hytner as Myron
- Ray Walston as Pops
- Martin Mull as Sam Maris, a "mean, cocktail-swigging developer"
- Rascal as Dumpster (the Bulldog)
- Deborah Rose as Inspector Edna Crabitz

The film was Lopez's first. In an interview quoted by Associated Press, he bemoaned the lack of roles for Hispanics, particularly in sitcoms.

During filming, Mull was offered the sitcom His & Hers. In an interview for the series with Associated Press, he claimed he and Ray Walston were the only actors over 21 working on the movie; although this was not true.

== Production ==
Locations included Park City and Snowbird, Utah.

The inclusion of snowboarding was considered novel at the time, with at least one critic explaining "for the uninitiated," it held "a small place in movie history."

== Marketing ==
The film tagline was "A Comedy with Flakes".

== Reception ==
Toronto Star critic Peter Goddard said that the film was predictable — "the average age in the crowd is about 19; the average age of the jokes is about 70" — and "pretty lame," but ultimately satisfied the crowd.

At least in Toronto, the distributor didn't offer an advance screening of the film for critics, and didn't have a press pack about the production. This surprised the critic, who compared it to Police Academy, which had grossed $500 million.
