= Lou Taylor Pucci =

American actor (born 1985)

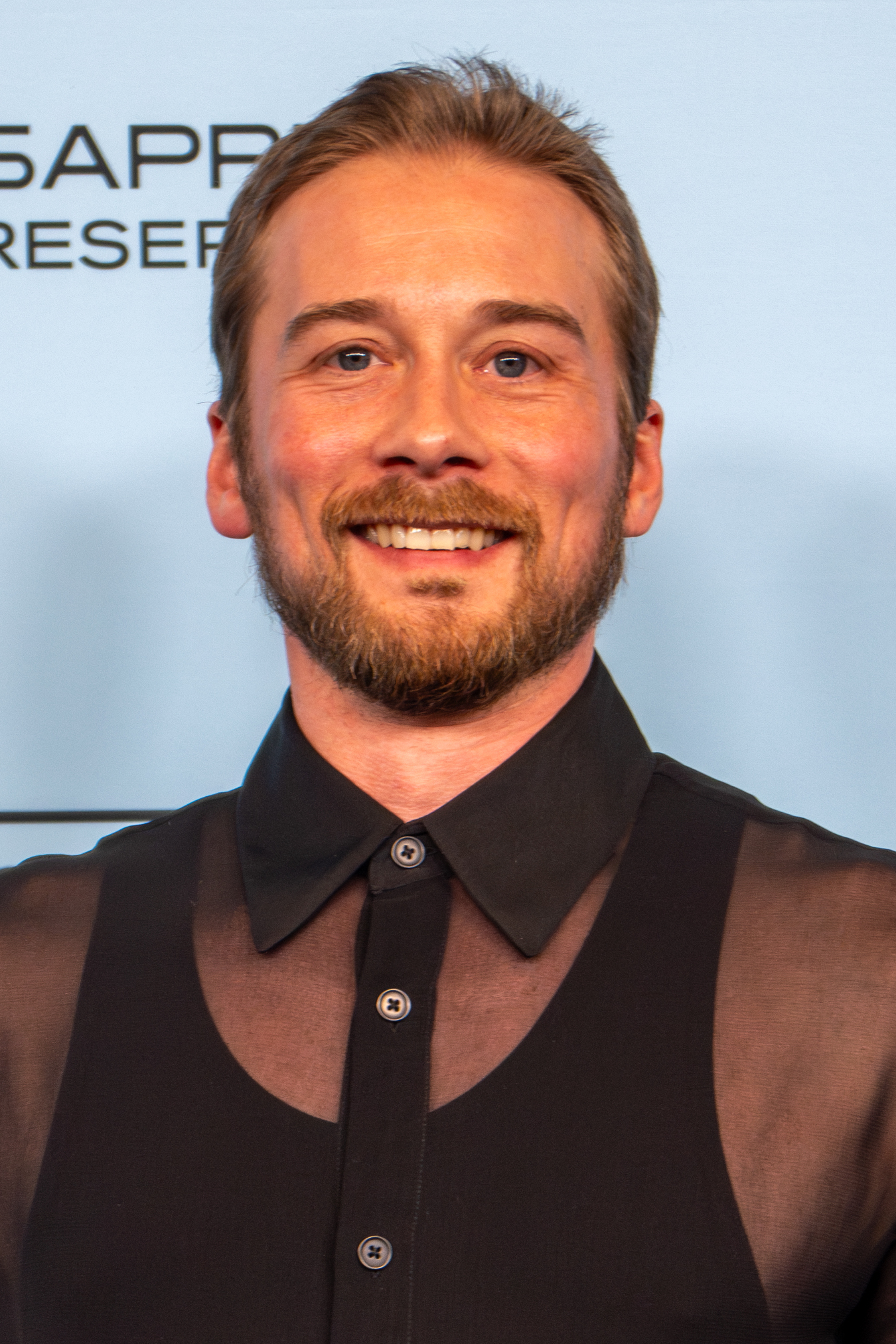
- Pucci at the 2025 Sundance Film Festival
- Born: July 27, 1985 (age 41); Seaside Heights, New Jersey, U.S.
- Occupation: Actor
- Years active: 2002–present

Lou Taylor Pucci (born July 27, 1985) is an American actor who first appeared on film in Rebecca Miller's Personal Velocity: Three Portraits in 2002. Pucci had his breakthrough leading role in Thumbsucker (2005), for which he won a Special Jury Prize at the Sundance Film Festival and the Silver Bear for Best Actor at the Berlin Film Festival. Pucci then starred in The Chumscrubber (2005), Fast Food Nation (2006), The Go-Getter (2007), Explicit Ills (2008), and Carriers (2009). Pucci had starring roles in the 2013 Evil Dead remake, as well as The Story of Luke (2013) and Spring (2014).

== Early life and education ==
Pucci was born in Seaside Heights, New Jersey. His mother, Linda Farver, is a former model and beauty queen (Miss Union County), and his father, Louis Pucci, worked as a guitarist for the bands The Watch and Leap of Faith. He has two brothers and one sister Penelope. At the age of two, he moved to Keansburg, New Jersey. He is a graduate of Christian Brothers Academy in Lincroft, New Jersey.

== Career ==
He first acted at the age of ten in a hometown production of Oliver!. Two years later he acted as an understudy on Broadway playing Friedrich in The Sound of Music. He can be seen in Arie Posin's The Chumscrubber, the HBO miniseries Empire Falls, and starring as the lead in Mike Mills' film Thumbsucker, for which he received the Special Jury Prize for Acting at the 2005 Sundance Film Festival and the Silver Bear Award for Best Actor at the 2005 Berlin Film Festival. He also played "St. Jimmy" in Green Day's "Jesus of Suburbia" music video (with Thumbsucker co-star Kelli Garner).

In 2009, Pucci had three films that screened at the Sundance Film Festival: Brief Interviews with Hideous Men, directed by John Krasinski; The Informers, with Billy Bob Thornton, Winona Ryder, Kim Basinger and Mickey Rourke, based on Bret Easton Ellis' collection of short stories of the same name; and The Answer Man (formerly Arlen Faber and The Dream of the Romans) with Jeff Daniels and Lauren Graham. Pucci was also a juror for the short film competition.

Pucci had roles in multiple indie films for the latter part of the decade, and had a leading role playing an autistic man in The Story of Luke (2013), alongside Seth Green. He also had a starring role in the Evil Dead (2013) remake, based on Sam Raimi's 1981 original and played one of the leading roles in the thriller Spring. In November 2014, Pucci starred as Teddy Courtney in a Law & Order: Special Victims Unit-Chicago P.D. crossover.

He also portrayed Ben in the horror film Ava's Possessions. In 2016, he starred alongside Michael Shannon in the western thriller Poor Boy, which premiered at the Tribeca Film Festival in April 2016.

In 2018, Pucci guest-starred in the first 3 episodes of Lifetime's thriller series You as Benji. In 2019 he guest-starred as Nock Nock in the FX comedy series You're the Worst, then went on to play a recurring role in American Horror Story: 1984.

== Filmography ==
=== Film ===
Year	Title	Role	Notes
2002	Personal Velocity: Three Portraits	Kevin	Grand Jury Prize, Sundance
2005	Thumbsucker	Justin Cobb	Best Actor: Sundance and Berlin
2005	The Chumscrubber	Lee	
2005	Fifty Pills	Darren	
2006	Fast Food Nation	Gerald 'Paco'	
2006	Southland Tales	Martin Kefauver	
2007	The Go-Getter	Mercer	
2008	Explicit Ills	Jacob	
2008	The Informers	Tim	
2009	The Answer Man	Kris Lucas	
2009	Brief Interviews with Hideous Men	Evan	
2009	Fanboys	Boba Fett #1	
2009	Horsemen	Alex Breslin	
2009	Fault Line		
2009	Carriers	Danny	
2010	Brotherhood	Kevin	
2010	Beginners	Magician	
2011	The Music Never Stopped	Gabriel Sawyer	
2011	The Legend of Hell's Gate: An American Conspiracy	Kid Called Kelly	
2012	All Together Now	Ron	
2012	Jack and Diane	Tom	
2012	The Story of Luke	Luke	Best actor at Irvine International Film Festival
2013	Evil Dead	Eric	
2014	Spring	Evan	
2015	Ava's Possessions	Ben	
2016	Poor Boy	Romeo Griggs	
2018	A.X.L.	Randall	
2023	Ex-Husbands	Aaron	
2025	Touch Me	Brian	
2026	Lockbox	Winthrop	

=== Television ===
Year	Title	Role	Notes
2005	Empire Falls	John Voss	Television mini-series
2006	Law & Order: Criminal Intent	Joey Frost	Episode: "Cruise to Nowhere"
2012	Girls	Eric	Episode: "The Return"
2014	Law & Order: Special Victims Unit	Teddy Courtney	Episode: "Chicago Crossover"
2014	Chicago P.D.	Teddy Courtney	Episode: "They'll Have to Go Through Me"
2014	Halt and Catch Fire	Heath	Episode: "Up Helly Aa"
2016	Falling Water	Andy	Recurring role; 3 episodes
2018	You	Benji Ashby	Recurring role; 3 episodes
2019	You're the Worst	Nock Nock	Recurring role; 3 episodes
2019	Younger	Travis Jason	Episode: "Merger, She Wrote"
2019	American Horror Story: 1984	Jonas Shevoore	Recurring role; 5 episodes
2021	Shameless	Lou Milkovich	Episode: "Slaughter"
2021–2023	Physical	Tyler	Main cast
2025	Daredevil: Born Again	Adam	3 episodes

=== Music videos ===
Year	Title	Artist	Role
2005	"Jesus of Suburbia"	Green Day	St. Jimmy/Jesus of Suburbia
