= Brotherhood (2010 film) =

- Directed by: Will Canon
- Written by: Will Canon; Doug Simon
- Produced by: Chris Pollack; Steve Hein; Tim O'Hair; Jason Croft
- Starring: Jon Foster; Trevor Morgan; Lou Taylor Pucci; Arlen Escarpeta
- Cinematography: Michael Fimognari
- Edited by: Josh Schaeffer
- Music by: Dan Marocco
- Distributed by: Phase 4 Films (US); Cinema Management Group (International)
- Release date: February 18, 2010
- Running time: 81 minutes
- Country: United States
- Language: English

Brotherhood is a 2010 American thriller film directed by Will Canon, co-written by Doug Simon and Canon, and starring Jon Foster, Trevor Morgan, Arlen Escarpeta, and Lou Taylor Pucci. It is about a fraternity initiation that goes horribly wrong. The film premiered at the 2010 SXSW Film Festival, where it won the festival's Audience Award.

== Plot ==
Frank (Jon Foster) is an active member of fictional fraternity Sigma Zeta Chi, and hazes pledges for initiation by forcing them to believe they are going to rob convenience stores. Adam (Trevor Morgan) and Kevin (Lou Taylor Pucci) are pledges who go with Frank to rob the stores. Before they enter the store, another active brother gives them the money and reveals it was a break designed to test their bravery. However, due to confusion over which stores to stop pledges, Kevin is not stopped and actually tries to rob the store; Kevin is shot in the shoulder as a result. Frank finds out of the mix-up and attempts to stop Kevin but is too late. With Adam's help, he subdues the store clerk, Mike (Arlen Escarpeta), who is a high school friend of Adam. They return to the fraternity house and clear a party to take care of Kevin's wounds, but Frank orders Adam and Graham (Luke Sexton) to go back to the store, recover the security tape, and check on Mike. When returning to the store, they find that the security camera does not work, but Mike is reluctant to tell the police a lie to cover their tracks.

Scared by Mike's attitude, Adam and Graham kidnap him and take him back to the house. Frank refuses taking Kevin to the hospital, fearful that the police will learn about the night's actions, and instead calls Bean's (Jesse Steccato) medical professor to take care of Kevin. Adam tries to blackmail Mike by secretly recording an elicited confession, but Mike stops talking once he discovers the recorder. Kevin's sister Emily (Jennifer Sipes) appears and angrily threatens to call the police over an unrelated prank. As she leaves, she is involved in a car accident with Bean's professor, who suffers a concussion and is rendered unable to help Kevin. With time running out and Kevin losing blood, Frank orders Mike's torturing to ensure his cooperation. At the same time, Officer Jennings (Jeff Gibbs), who is a former member, discovers Kevin but decides to stay quiet. Adam becomes insistent in taking Kevin to the hospital and tells Frank he can get leverage on Mike after hearing money is missing from the store. Adam is able to get Mike to admit he stole the money, but Mike will only cooperate if they return the stolen money and clear his name. After a tense standoff with a nervous clerk, Adam and Frank succeed in returning the money, and Frank allows them to drop off Kevin in the hospital; they claim it is a hunting accident.

Frank says the night is a victory but Adam sees otherwise and decides to leave the fraternity, angry at their arrogance and callousness. After Adam punches Frank, the other members catch Adam and begin to beat him harshly, as Frank claims that their brotherhood and loyalty helped them get out of trouble. Another fraternity member, Jackson (Chad Halbrook), returns to the house and remembers that a pledge was locked into the trunk during the party; when they open the trunk, they discover the pledge has died from alcohol poisoning. Adam finally calls the police and tells them everything, which leads to the arrest of Frank and others.

== Cast ==
- Jon Foster as Frank
- Trevor Morgan as Adam
- Lou Taylor Pucci as Kevin
- Arlen Escarpeta as Mike
- Jesse Steccato as Bean
- Jennifer Sipes as Emily
- Luke Sexton as Graham
- Meyer deLeeuw as Collin
- Jeff Gibbs as Officer Jennings

== Production ==
Brotherhood is the directorial debut film of Will Canon. It was based on his short film, Roslyn, which in turn was inspired by stories told by a friend. Canon wanted to make a genre film in the style of Roger Corman's exploitation films of the 1970s. He cited his influences for Joe Carnahan, Paul Thomas Anderson, and Michael Mann. Quentin Tarantino, Robert Rodriguez, and Richard Linklater also served as references for his film. Brotherhood was shot entirely on location in Arlington, Texas.

The fictional Sigma Zeta Chi fraternity house is the former Delta Upsilon fraternity house on campus at the University of Texas at Arlington. Soon after filming was finished, the house was nearly destroyed in an electrical fire. The house has been fully renovated since then.

== Release ==
The film premiered in Dallas on February 18, 2011, and in Los Angeles February 25. It also premiered in the United Kingdom on January 17, 2011. The film premiered in New York, and was later released on straight-to-DVD in Australia on March 11, 2011.

== Reception ==
The review aggregator website Rotten Tomatoes reported a 54% approval rating with an average rating of 5.1/10 based on 26 reviews. Nigel Floyd of Time Out London rated it two out of five stars and criticized its lack of credibility, though he calls it "beautifully shot". Tim Robey of The Telegraph also criticizes the film's credibility. Peter Bradshaw of The Guardian rated it three out of five stars and stated that it is "entertaining in a nasty way." Variety's Joe Leydon favorably compared it to classic film noir and praised the film's uniqueness. Robert Abele of the Los Angeles Times criticized the lack of likable characters and entertainment value, though he says there are some tense scenes. Writing for The New York Times, Neil Genzlinger calls it a "fast moving thriller" and praises the pacing. Peter Martin of Twitch Film also praises the pacing, though he stated that "botched heist" films have become predictable.

=== Awards and nominations ===
The film won the Audience Awards at the 2010 SXSW Film Festival, 2010 Dallas International Film Festival, and 2010 Sidewalk Moving Picture Festival. It also won the Grand Jury Prize at the 2010 New Hampshire Film Festival. At the 2010 Gotham Awards, the film was nominated for the first Festival Genius Audience Award. The New York Times awarded it with a NYT Critics' Pick.
