= Explicit Ills =

- Directed by: Mark Webber
- Written by: Mark Webber
- Produced by: Gary Adelman
- Starring: Francisco Burgos; Paul Dano; Rosario Dawson; Naomie Harris; Lou Taylor Pucci; Frankie Shaw
- Release dates: March 2008 (SXSW); March 6, 2009 (United States)
- Running time: 87 minutes
- Country: United States
- Language: English

Explicit Ills is a 2008 American film, written and directed by Mark Webber in his directorial debut. The film features four interconnected stories taking place in Philadelphia involving subject matter such as poverty, drugs, and the possibility of love.

The film won the Audience Award for Narrative Feature and the Special Jury Award for Cinematography at the SXSW Film Festival.

== Cast ==
- Francisco Burgos as Babo
- Paul Dano as Rocco
- Rosario Dawson as Babo's Mother
- Naomie Harris as Jill
- Lou Taylor Pucci as Jacob
- Frankie Shaw as Michelle
- Tariq Trotter as Kaleef
- Martin Cepeda as Demetri
- Cheri Honkala as March organizer
- Tim Dowlin as March Organizer
