= The Answer Man (film) =

- Theatrical release poster
- Directed by: John Hindman
- Written by: John Hindman
- Produced by: Kevin Messick; Jana Edelbaum
- Starring: Jeff Daniels; Lauren Graham; Lou Taylor Pucci; Olivia Thirlby; Kat Dennings; Thomas Roy
- Cinematography: Oliver Bokelberg
- Edited by: Gerald B. Greenberg
- Music by: Teddy Castellucci
- Distributed by: Magnolia Pictures
- Release date: July 24, 2009 (United States)
- Running time: 95 minutes
- Country: United States
- Language: English
- Box office: $47,865

The Answer Man (previously titled The Dream of the Romans and Arlen Faber) is a 2009 American romantic comedy film written and directed by John Hindman and starring Jeff Daniels, Lauren Graham and Lou Taylor Pucci. The film premiered at the 2009 Sundance Film Festival. The film received negative reviews.

== Plot ==
Reclusive author Arlen Faber wrote a best-selling spiritual book, Me and God, but rejects the celebrity it has brought him and lives anonymously in Philadelphia. He zelously guards his identity and refuses to cooperate with his publisher, who wishes him to help publicize the 20th anniversary of the book's release. However, his identity is gradually revealed to a mail carrier, bookstore owner Kris, and chiropractor Elizabeth.

Arlen is reluctantly drawn into relationships with Kris and Elizabeth—each of whom has their own problems. Kris is an alcoholic who is just out of rehab and who is troubled by the impending failure of his bookstore and his father's persistent alcoholism. Elizabeth and her seven-year-old son were abandoned by her husband, causing her to be overprotective of the boy. She has moved to Philadelphia to open a chiropractic clinic and start her life anew.

A back injury causes Arlen to crawl to the clinic for help. Elizabeth fixes his back problem and the two of them begin awkwardly dating. She is hesitant to become involved because of her concern for her son and having been left by her husband. He is an emotional mess, largely because of the death of his father from Alzheimer's. Despite writing a spiritual book about conversations with God, he is spiritually adrift and seeks answers to difficult questions. He charms her, but he also says inappropriate, abrasive things that almost doom the relationship.

Kris and Arlen make a deal where they trade books for answers to questions. Each day, Arlen gives books to Kris to sell and allows him to ask him a single question about spiritual matters.

Arlen's newfound relationships come to a crisis when Kris's father dies and he shows up at Arlen's house for solace while Elizabeth is there. She comforts Kris, but Arlen is emotionally blocked and unable to provide sympathy, which appalls Elizabeth.

The crisis impels Arlen to change. He arranges to have his book's new release held at Kris's bookstore—seemingly saving it from bankruptcy. At the book's release, he reveals the impact of his father's death to both Elizabeth and fans of his book. He tells them that he does not speak with God, that he had many questions after his father's death and did his best to come up with some answers. Elizabeth is touched by Arlen's revelation, but she still does not trust him and runs from the bookstore. Arlen pursues her and they have an emotional reconnection. They agree to make a new attempt at a relationship and are last seen walking down the sidewalk together.

== Cast ==
- Jeff Daniels as Arlen Faber
- Lauren Graham as Elizabeth
- Lou Taylor Pucci as Kris Lucas
- Thomas Roy as Riley Lucas
- Olivia Thirlby as Anne
- Kat Dennings as Dahlia
- Nora Dunn as Terry Fraser
- Max Antisell as Alex
- Tony Hale as Mailman

== Production ==
Filming, using the working title The Dream of the Romans, began on March 23, 2008, in Philadelphia, and ended in June 2008. Philadelphia native Thomas Roy plays the alcoholic father of the character played by Lou Taylor Pucci.

== Reception ==
The Answer Man received negative reviews. Rotten Tomatoes gives it a score of 32% based on 47 reviews, with an average rating of 5.06/10. The site's critics consensus reads: "The Answer Man takes an interesting premise and overloads it with implausible scenarios, indie comedy cliches, and an all-too-familiar story arc that only occasionally benefits from its typically capable actors." Metacritic reports a score of 44/100 based on 16 critic reviews, indicating "mixed or average reviews".
