= Walking Tall (2004 film) =

2004 American vigilante action film

- Theatrical release poster
- Directed by: Kevin Bray
- Written by: David Klass; Channing Gibson; David Levien; Brian Koppelman
- Based on: Walking Tall by Mort Briskin
- Produced by: Ashok Amritraj; Jim Burke; Lucas Foster; David Hoberman; Paul Schiff
- Starring: The Rock; Johnny Knoxville; Neal McDonough; Kristen Wilson; Ashley Scott
- Cinematography: Glen MacPherson
- Edited by: George Bowers
- Music by: Graeme Revell
- Production companies: Metro-Goldwyn-Mayer; Hyde Park Entertainment; Mandeville Films; Burke/Samples/Foster Productions; WWE Films
- Distributed by: MGM Distribution Co. (North America); 20th Century Fox (International)
- Release date: April 2, 2004 (United States)
- Running time: 86 minutes
- Country: United States
- Language: English
- Budget: $46 million
- Box office: $57.2 million

Walking Tall is a 2004 American vigilante action film directed by Kevin Bray. It is a remake of the 1973 film of the same name, and stars The Rock and Johnny Knoxville. The film revolves around a discharged U.S. Army soldier who returns to his hometown, only to become the town's sheriff when he finds it rife with heinous crimes and corruption.

Walking Tall was released on April 2, 2004, by MGM Distribution Co. in the United States, with 20th Century Fox releasing in select international territories. The film received negative reviews from critics and grossed $57.2 million against a $46 million budget.

== Plot ==
Sergeant Chris Vaughn is a former Green Beret who returns to his small hometown in Kitsap County. Looking for work, Chris finds that the local cedar mill was closed down three years earlier by its owner, Jay Hamilton, who opened a casino that now accounts for the majority of the local area's revenue. Hamilton, who was Chris's school friend, invites him to a night of fun at the casino. While checking out the VIP lounge, Chris stumbles upon his childhood friend Deni, who is now working as a stripper. He notices the craps dealer using loaded dice and demonstrates this to the patrons. When the floorman refuses to pay out, Chris instigates a fight. Although Chris beats most of the security guards, he is subdued with a cattle prod. In the basement, Hamilton's head of security, Booth, cuts Chris's torso with a utility knife and leaves him for dead.

After recovering, Chris attempts to press charges, but Sheriff Stan Watkins refuses, saying the casino is untouchable. Chris learns that his nephew Pete has overdosed on meth, which was sold to his friends by the casino security guards. Furious, Chris arrives at the casino and, using a piece of lumber as a club, destroys casino property and brutally beats the security guards. Sheriff Watkins and his deputies apprehend Chris as he drives away. In the ensuing trial, Hamilton's security and staff testify against Chris. When the judge allows Chris to present his defense, he fires his appointed attorney, whom he suspects of working for Hamilton. Chris gives a civic speech about the town's former glory and promises to clean it up if acquitted. To further emphasize his plea, Chris reveals the grotesque scars on his torso. Chris is acquitted and wins the sheriff's election.

Upon taking office, Chris summarily dismisses the entire police force and deputizes his friend Ray Templeton. Being a former drug addict, Ray teaches Chris about narcotics. Chris and Ray crack down on a supply spot and take Booth into custody. Despite stripping his truck into pieces in front of him, Booth reveals nothing. Chris assigns Ray to stand watch over his house in case Hamilton targets his family. Chris remains at the sheriff's office to supervise Booth. Deni visits him, brings him food, and reveals that she quit her job. The next morning, Watkins and his deputies arrive at Chris's office, blow up his truck, and fire upon the building with machine guns. Recognizing his dangerous predicament, Booth pleads for Chris to let him out of his cell. Chris uses the situation as leverage, and Booth reveals that the drug lab is in the cedar mill. Booth is killed immediately by the attackers' indiscriminate fire, but Chris kills the attackers with Deni's help. Chris's parents' house is also attacked, but Ray and Chris's father dispatch the gunmen.

After ensuring their safety, Chris heads for the mill. Hamilton, calmly waiting in a control room, attempts to kill Chris with the mill equipment. Chris drags Hamilton through a trap door with him, and the two fall through a chute. Chris, whose leg is injured, tends to his injury in a nearby forest before Hamilton attacks him with an axe. Chris cripples Hamilton and arrests him. With Ray's assistance, Chris shuts down the casino and reopens the cedar mill.

== Cast ==
- Dwayne Johnson (credited as The Rock) as Chris Vaughn Jr., an Army veteran who runs for sheriff in an effort to clean up his hometown
  - Both the character and the story are based on Sheriff Buford Pusser and his time as sheriff of McNairy County, Tennessee. The film is dedicated to his memory.
- Johnny Knoxville as Ray Templeton, Chris's friend and former convict deputized by Chris
- Neal McDonough as Jay Hamilton, Chris's former friend and owner of the casino. He is also the head of the drug trade in the town
- Michael Bowen as Sheriff Stan Watkins, a corrupt sheriff who allows Hamilton and his men to run the casino undisturbed as a front for their drug dealing
- Kevin Durand as J.W. Booth, the head of security at the casino and one of Hamilton's dealers
- Kristen Wilson as Michelle Vaughn, Chris's sister and paramedic
- Ashley Scott as Deni, Chris's friend and love interest, who worked at the casino as a stripper
- Barbara Tarbuck as Connie Vaughn, Chris's mother
- Khleo Thomas as Pete Vaughn, Michelle's son, and Chris's nephew
- John Beasley as Chris Vaughn Sr., Chris's father
- Cobie Smulders as Exotic Beauty, one of the employees at the casino

== Reception ==
Based on 134 reviews collected by the film review aggregator Rotten Tomatoes, 27% of critics gave Walking Tall a positive review, with an average rating of 5.4/10. The site's critics consensus reads: "The Rock makes a competent hero, but the movie is content to let a 2×4 do all the talking." Metacritic gave the film a score of 44 out of 100 based on 31 critics, indicating "mixed or average reviews". Audiences polled by CinemaScore gave the film an average grade of "B+" on an A+ to F scale.

The film grossed $57 million worldwide, with a budget of $46 million.

== Sequels ==
Walking Tall: The Payback and Walking Tall: Lone Justice are two direct-to-video sequels that have been released starring Kevin Sorbo.

== Home media ==
The film was released on DVD and VHS on September 28, 2004, by MGM Home Entertainment. MGM later released it on Blu-ray on June 2, 2009. It was later released on Ultra HD Blu-ray on December 9, 2025, by Kino Lorber.

== See also ==
- Vigilante film
