= Poor Boy (film) =

2016 film

- Theatrical release poster by April Scarduzio
- Directed by: Robert Scott Wildes
- Written by: Logan Antill
- Produced by: Robert Scott Wildes
- Starring: Lou Taylor Pucci; Dov Tiefenbach; Pat Healy; Justin Chatwin; Andy Bean; Amanda Crew; Michael Shannon
- Cinematography: Andrew Wheeler
- Edited by: Chris Walldorf
- Music by: Chris Walldorf
- Production companies: Them Gold Wolves; Bow and Arrow Entertainment
- Distributed by: Indican Pictures
- Release dates: April 17, 2016 (TFF); July 13, 2018 (Theatrical release)
- Running time: 104 minutes
- Country: United States
- Language: English
- Budget: $75,000
- Box office: $31,031

Poor Boy is a 2016 American Western film directed by Robert Scott Wildes and written by Logan Antill. The film stars Lou Taylor Pucci and Dov Tiefenbach.

== Plot summary ==
Romeo and Samson Griggs are two brothers who live in the desert. Left at birth in the will of fate, and growing up without any purpose in life, these brainless young men survive by gambling and hustling. When a mysterious woman threatens to repo their much beloved houseboat, Prickface and Poor Boy, as they are nicknamed by the locals, cook up the biggest theft yet. With the goal of making enough money for moving to California, the brothers are planning to leave behind their miserable lives once for all.

== Cast ==
- Lou Taylor Pucci as Romeo Griggs
- Dov Tiefenbach as Samson Griggs
- Pat Healy as Vern Rickey
- Justin Chatwin as Jackie Clean
- Andy Bean as Drime
- Amanda Crew as Charlene Rox
- Jon Foster as Roscoe Joe
- Michael Shannon as Blayde Griggs
- Amy Ferguson as Cynthia Ravenblanket
- Dale Dickey as Deb Chilson
- Eszter Balint as Missus Waxman

== Production ==
In March 2015, Lou Taylor Pucci announced that he will star in the film, with Robert Scott Wildes directing from a screenplay he wrote with Logan Antill, Kristin Mann serving as producer.

Principal photography began on May 6, 2015 in Las Vegas, and concluded on June 1, 2015, with a total of 20 days of shooting.

== Reception ==
Review aggregator website Rotten Tomatoes reports that 20% of 5 critics gave the film a positive review, with an average rating of 3.30 out of 10.

== Release ==
Poor Boy had its world premiere at the Tribeca Film Festival on April 17, 2016. Indican Pictures acquired the domestic distribution rights and released the film on July 13, 2018, in select theaters and through video on demand.
