= Gail Cronauer =

American actress

- Born: December 23, 1948 (age 76)
- Occupation(s): Actress, Acting professor

Gail Cronauer is an American stage, television, and feature film actress and an acting professor. She has performed in films as diverse as Oliver Stone's JFK to the TV series, Walker, Texas Ranger. She is a recipient of the 2007 Dallas Fort Worth Theater Critics Forum award, for her role in the Lyric Stage production Master Class.

== Early life and career ==
Gail Cronauer was born in Pennsylvania and grew up in New Jersey. Cronauer attended Antioch College for her undergraduate degree, and after working on the musical Viet Rock, was galvanized to pursue a career in theatre and dance. She obtained her BA in theatre and dance from Antioch College in 1971 and then got her MFA in acting from the Case Western Reserve University. Cronauer moved to Dallas in 1979 to teach acting at Southern Methodist University, where she met her husband Mark Hougland in the university's graduate theatre program.

Cronauer also has taught acting at Illinois State University, Southern Methodist University, Webster College, the University of Wisconsin–Green Bay, Texas Women's University, and most recently at Collin College, where she worked from 1992 until her retirement in 2020. She is a member of Actors' Equity Association, Screen Actors Guild/AFTRA and Women in Film and Television International.

== Filmography ==
Films
Year	Film	Role
1987	Positive I.D.	Melissa
1991	JFK	Janet Williams
1993	Flesh and Bone	Emma
1994	The Substitute Wife	Isabel Donahue
1995	A Mother's Gift	Maggie
1995	The Unspoken Truth	Nora
1996	A Promise to Carolyn	Dr. Davis
1996	Carried Away	Beverly
1997	Selena	Women Customer
1997	It's in the Water	Harriet
1997	Litte Boy Blue	Motel Clerk
1998	Hefner: Unauthorized	Grace Hefner
1998	Finding North	Mrs. Penn
1998	The Newton Boys	Ma Newton
1998	Detention	Ms. Nunca
1999	Boys Don't Cry	Clerk
2000	Dr. T and the Women	Dr. T's Patient
2002	Warning: Parental Advisory	Senator Paula Hawkins
2002	The Anarchist Cookbook	Woman In Book Store
2003	Air	Myna
2003	Single and Dealing with It	Mother
2004	Seventy-8	Margaret Meeks
2006	Infamous	Bonnie Clutter
2007	Walking Tall: The Payback	Emma Prescott
2007	Walking Tall: Lone Justice	Emma Prescott
2009	Dirty Red	Sister Grace Thomas
2010	Earthling	Isabel
2010	In the Land of Fireworks	Lawyer Brown
2010	Spilt Milk	Lois Schwartz
2012	Fuzzy Bubbles (Short)	Sandra
2013	Odd Man Out	Mother
2013	Sparrow (Short)	Moreen
2014	Piggy's Lament (Short)	Willa Kay
2014	Steps of Faith	Bell Wilcoxs
2014	Separate Rooms (Short)	Delores Shearer
2015	The Outfit (Short)	Mrs. Coleman
2015	Beyond the Farthest Star	Joycee Jones
2016	Occupy, Texas	The Principal
2016	The Sector	Trading Post Woman
2016	Te Ata	Eleanor Roosevelt
2016	A Heart That Forgives	Betty
2016	Kreep	Hazel
2017	Something Borrowed, Something Blue (Short)	Mom
2017	Freaks	Mama
2018	Texas Cotton	Judge Hoover
2019	CatFest (Short)	Anya
2019	The Vast of Night	Mabel Blanche
2020	One of These Days	Martha
2020	Undying	Olga
2020	The Seventh Day	Secretary

Television
Year(s)	Series	Role	Notes
1997–2001	Walker, Texas Ranger	Surgeon / Dr. Larson / Principal / Millie Hunt / Ted Lannon	5 episodes
1996–2004	LAX	Serb Woman / Lannon	"Pilot" "The Return of LaRue"
2013-2020	Bail Out	Josie O'Banion	Recurring
2013	Delphis	Sophie	"Sophie, the Bitch"
2014	Revolution	Shirlee	"Austin City Limits"
2014	Dallas	Dr. Englert	"Like a Bad Penny"
2024-	Landman	Beverly	3 episodes

== Awards ==
- 2007 Dallas Fort Worth Theater Critics Forum- Actress
