= The Beacon (film) =

- Film poster
- Directed by: Michael Stokes
- Screenplay by: Michael Stokes
- Produced by: Sally Helppie
- Starring: Teri Polo; David Rees Snell; Elaine Hendrix; Ken Howard; Marnette Patterson; Nick Sowell; Michael Ironside; Jonny Cruz
- Cinematography: Bobby Bukowski
- Edited by: Stephen Lovejoy
- Music by: John Majkut
- Production company: Sabbatical Pictures
- Release date: October 25, 2009
- Country: United States
- Language: English

The Beacon (later renamed Haunting at the Beacon) is a 2009 American horror/thriller film directed and written by Michael Stokes. The second film by Sabbatical Pictures, it was shot at The Rogers Hotel in Waxahachie, Texas and debuted in seven cities in October 2009. It was shown at the 2009 Paranoia Film Festival, where it was awarded Best Picture and Best Actress (Teri Polo). It was also shown at the 2009 LA Femme Film Festival.

== Plot ==
While trying to get their lives back on track after the loss of their four-year-old son, Bryn and Paul Shaw move to the charming old Beacon Apartments. Bryn begins seeing a ghostly little boy skulking around the building. With the help of an eccentric young professor and a tough old beat cop, Bryn tries to uncover the details of the boy's death, hoping that freeing him will allow him to carry a message to her son. She then realizes a second, malevolent entity stalks the Beacon's halls, one that doesn't want the boy to escape.

== Cast ==
- Teri Polo as Bryn Shaw
- David Rees Snell as Paul Shaw
- Elaine Hendrix as Vanessa Carver
- Ken Howard as Officer Bobby Ford
- Marnette Patterson as Christina Wade
- Nick Sowell as Will Tyler
- Michael Ironside as Lt. Hutton
- Jonny Cruz as Simón Valencia
