= Jon Foster =

American actor (born 1984)

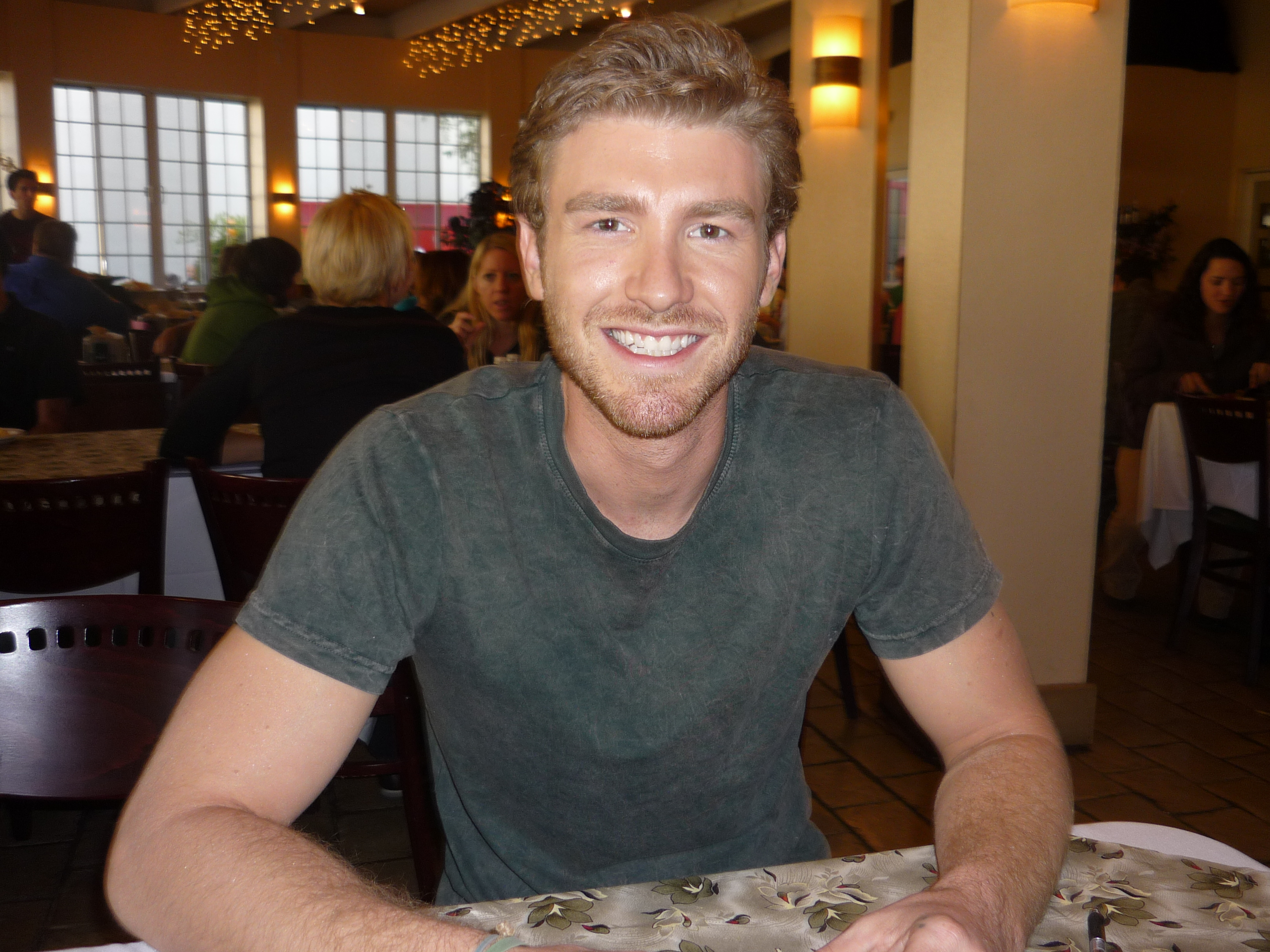
- Foster in October 2009
- Born: August 3, 1984 (age 41); Boston, Massachusetts, U.S.
- Occupations: Actor, musician
- Years active: 1999–present
- Spouse: Chelsea Tyler (m. 2015)
- Children: 2
- Relatives: Ben Foster (brother); Laura Prepon (ex-sister-in-law); Liv Tyler (sister-in-law); Mia Tyler (sister-in-law); Steven Tyler (father-in-law)

Jon Foster (born August 3, 1984) is an American actor. His films include the drama The Door in the Floor (2004), the horror film Stay Alive (2006), the thriller Brotherhood (2010), and the drama Rampart (2011). Foster is a co-founder of the electronic-soul duo Kaneholler, with his wife, Chelsea Tyler who is the daughter of musician and singer Steven Tyler.

== Early life ==
Foster was born on August 3, 1984, in Boston, the son of restaurant owners. He has an older brother, actor Ben Foster. Ben described their parents as "free-spirited, Vietnam-protesting hippies". His paternal grandparents were Celia (Segal) and A. (Abraham) Frank Foster, a prominent judge and politician in Boston; their families were Jewish immigrants from the Russian Empire.

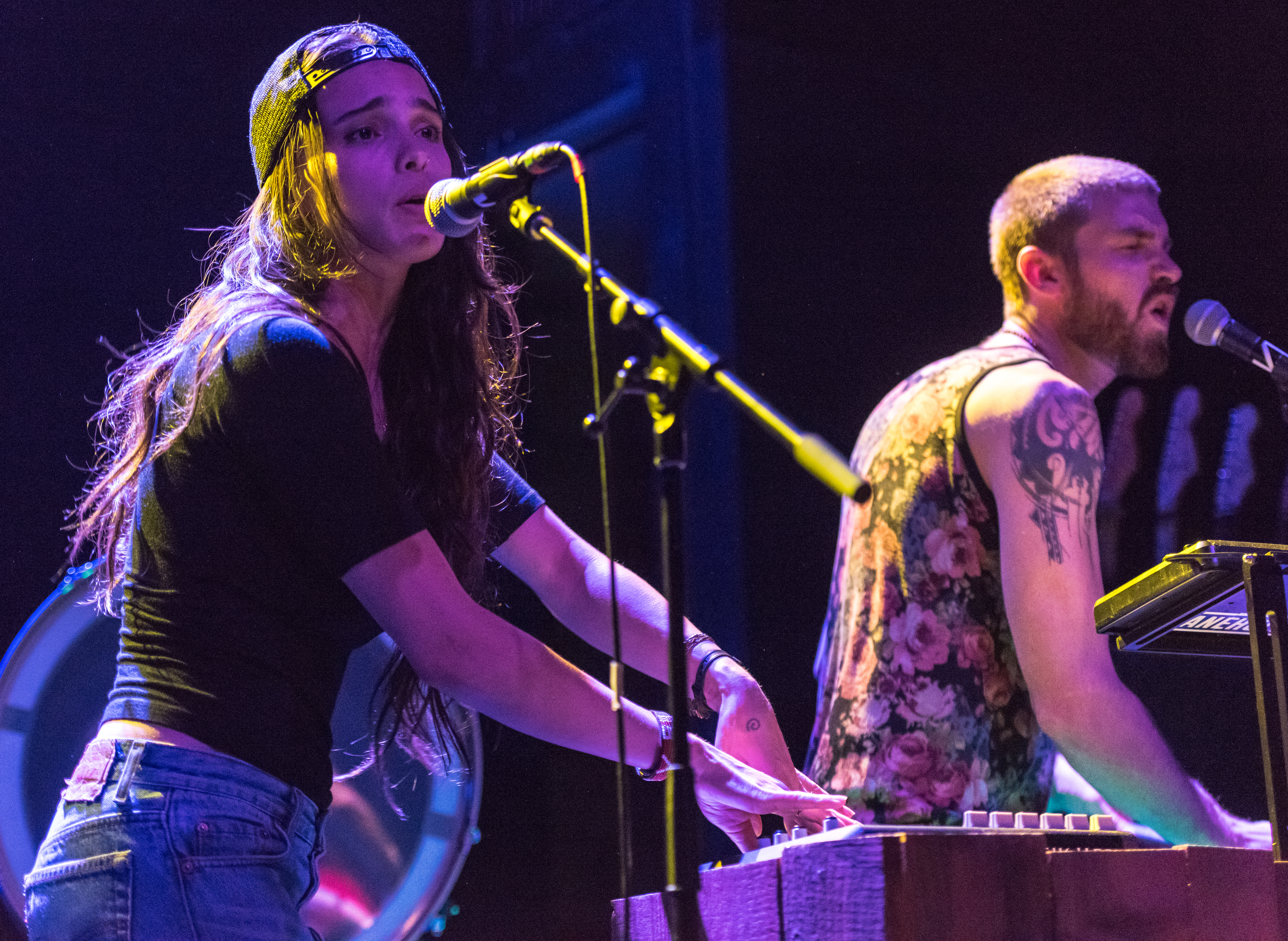
Kaneholler performing in 2015

His family relocated to Fairfield, Iowa, after their Boston home was burgled while they were present.

== Personal life ==
On June 20, 2015, Foster married Chelsea Tyler, a daughter of Steven Tyler and half-sister of Liv Tyler. The two formed the electronic-soul band Kaneholler. On February 21, 2020, they welcomed their first child, a son named Vincent Frank Foster.

== Filmography ==
Film
Year	Title	Role	Notes
2000	Thirteen Days	Kenny O'Donnell, Jr.	
2001	Life as a House	Corey	
2002	Murder in Greenwich	Michael Skakel	Television film Nominated—Young Artist Award for Best Performance in a TV Movie, Miniseries or Special – Leading Young Actor
2003	Terminator 3: Rise of the Machines	ampm gas station cashier	
2004	The Door in the Floor	Eddie O'Hare	
2006	Stay Alive	Hutch MacNeil	
2008	The Mysteries of Pittsburgh	Art Bechstein	
2008	The Informers	Graham Sloan	
2009	Tenderness	Eric Komenko	
2009	Fault Line	—N/a	
2009	Pandorum	Big Russian passenger	
2010	Brotherhood	Frank	
2010	The Last Rites of Ransom Pride	Champ Pride	
2011	Rampart	Michael Whittaker	
2013	Mr. Jones	Scott	
2016	Poor Boy	Roscoe Joe	
2018	Like Father	Owen	

Television
Year	Title	Role	Notes
1999	Get Real	Will	Episode: "Pilot"
2000	Judging Amy	Gregory Dox	Episode: "Instincts"
2001	Danny	Henry	Main cast; 9 episodes
2004–2005	Life as We Know It	Ben Connor	Main cast; 13 episodes
2005	Law & Order: Special Victims Unit	Justin Sharp	Episode: "Intoxicated"
2006	Windfall	Damien Cutler	Main cast; 13 episodes
2009–2010	Accidentally on Purpose	Zack Crawchuck	Main cast; 18 episodes
2012	Ben and Kate	George	Episode: "Pilot"
2013	Suits	Trent Devon	Episode: "Blood in the Water"
2020	9-1-1: Lone Star	Dustin Shepard	2 episodes
