= David Rees Snell =

American actor

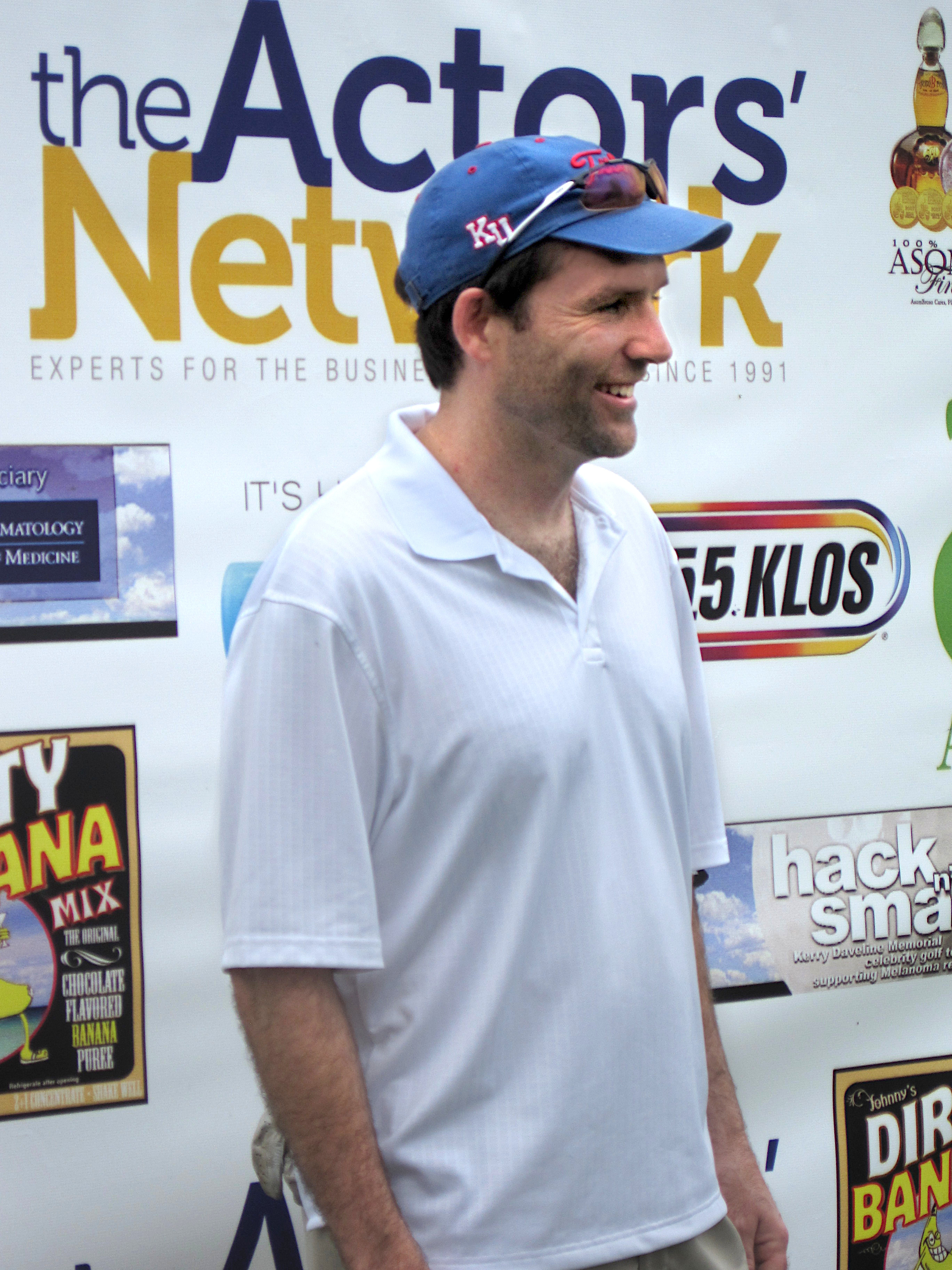
- Snell in 2011
- Born: August 20, 1966 (age 60); Wichita, Kansas, U.S.
- Occupation: Actor
- Years active: 1993–present

David Rees Snell (born August 20, 1966) is an American actor. He is known for his roles as Detective Ronnie Gardocki on the crime drama The Shield, Detective John Burrows in S.W.A.T. (2018–2025), and Paul in The Beacon (2009).

== Career ==
Snell was born in Wichita, Kansas. He attended the University of Kansas as a theater major. He performed mostly on stage before becoming involved in television work.

=== Television ===
When The Shield was picked up by FX, Snell was initially hired as a non-speaking role. He was told the writers had no plans for developing his character, due to his being a last minute addition to an already large cast of actors. However, after several episodes, his character was made a permanent member of the tactical unit known as The Strike Team. Snell subsequently appeared in almost every episode, with his character garnering a sizable following amongst fans of the show. When his screen time expanded during season 5, he became a full-time cast member for the remainder of the series.

Snell co-starred in the Hallmark TV movie Desolation Canyon (2006) with his fellow Shield cast member Kenny Johnson. More recently, he was cast in a recurring role as a terrorist during the fourth and final season of The Unit. In recent years, he guest starred on Hawthorne, Numb3rs, Lie to Me, Sons of Anarchy, Last Resort, Criminal Minds, Leverage, and Silicon Valley.

=== Voiceover ===
Snell is also a voice actor who has appeared in such short films as P1 and Draw the Pirate. He also had speaking roles in a number of video games including Need for Speed: Undercover and Call of Duty 2 Big Red One.

== Filmography ==
Film
Year	Title	Role	Notes
1993	I Can Make You Love Me	Mark Blauvelt	TV film
1995	Truman	Reporter #2	TV film
1998	Monday After the Miracle	William Alexander	TV film
1999	P.1	Man	Short film
1999	Ride with the Devil	Poker Player	
2001	The Good Things	Dr Heibert	Short film
2002	Fueling the Fire	Unknown	Short film
2004	Draw the Pirate	J. Cooper	Short film
2006	Desolation Canyon	Edwin Bornstein	TV film
2008	Exit Speed	Danny Gunn	
2009	The Beacon	Paul Shaw	
2009	Red Blue States	Roy	Short film
2009	Friends of Dorothy	Jesse James V	Short film
2012	Shadow Witness	John Krause	
2013	Bless Me, Ultima	Father Byrnes	
2013	The Cheating Pact	Detective Roberts	TV film
2016	The Cheerleader Murders	Don	
2016	The Great Break-Up Contest	Mr. Peterson	Short film
2017	Crappy Birthday	Matt	Short film
2018	Nanny Killer	Edward	
TBA	Door in the Woods	Redd	Post-production

Television
Year	Title	Role	Notes
2002–2008	The Shield	Ronnie Gardocki	Recurring role (2002-2005); Main role (2006-2008)
2008–2009	The Unit	Leon Drake	"Shadow Riders" (season 4: episode 9) "The Spear of Destiny" (season 4: episode 13) "Best Laid Plans"(season 4: episode 18) "Chaos Theory" (season 4: episode 20) "End Game" (season 4: episode 21) "Unknown Soldier" (season 4: episode 22)
2009	Hawthorne	Dan Johnson	"The Sense of Belonging" (season 1: episode 5)
2009	Numbers	Herb Moore	"Dreamland" (season 6: episode 6)
2010	Lie to Me	Kevin Wilkie	"Pied Piper" (season 2: episode 19)
2010	Criminal Minds	Detective Green	"Remembrance of Things Past" (season 6: episode 3)
2011	Leverage	Greg Sherman	"The Boiler Room Job" (season 4: episode 8)
2011	NCIS	Morgan Hunt	"Sins of the Father" (season 9: episode 10)
2011	Sons of Anarchy	Agent Grad Nicholas	"Out" (season 4: episode 1) "Booster"(season 4: episode 2) "Dorylus" (season 4: episode 3) "Una Venta" (season 4: episode 4) "Kiss" (season 4: episode 9) "Burnt and Purged Away" (season 4: episode 12) "To Be, Act 1" (season 4: episode 13) "To Be, Act 2" (season 4: episode 14)
2012	Hawaii Five-0	Freddy Schumaker	"Kahu" (season 3: episode 11)
2012–2013	Last Resort	Barry Hopper	"Captain" (season 1: episode 1) "Voluntold" (season 1: episode 4) "Another Fine Navy Day" (season 1: episode 6) "Nuke It Out"(season 1: episode 7) "Cinderella Liberty" (season 1: episode 9) "Blue Water" (season 1: episode 10) "Damn the Torpedoes" (season 1: episode 11) "The Pointy End of the Spear" (season 1: episode 12) "Controlled Flight Into Terrain" (season 1: episode 13)
2013	Grey's Anatomy	Richy Rich	"Puttin' on the Ritz" (season 10: episode 4)
2014	Cleaners	Phillips	"There's Been a Complication" (season 2: episode 1) "Welcome to the Zoo" (season 2: episode 2) "The Not So Safe House" (season 2: episode 4) "The Caterpillar and the Butterfly"(season 2: episode 6) "Welcome Home Sally" (season 2: episode 7) "Batten Down the Hatches" (season 2: episode 8) "Yin & Yang" (season 2: episode 9) "Tripping Balls" (season 2: episode 10)
2014	Eagleheart	Gribbs	"Gribbs" (season 3: episode 9)
2015	Scandal	Agent Fielding	"Where's the Black Lady?" (season 4: episode 11)
2015	Silicon Valley	Ross Loma Capital Executive	"Sand Hill Shuffle" (season 2: episode 1) "Runaway Devaluation" (season 2: episode 2)
2017	The Fosters	Jim Baker	"Dirty Laundry" (season 4: episode 18)
2017	The Mick	Don	"The Sleepover" (season 1: episode 15)
2017	Major Crimes	FPX News Reporter	"Sanctuary City: Part 1" (season 6: episode 1) "Sanctuary City: Part 2" (season 6: episode 2) "Sanctuary City: Part 3" (season 6: episode 3) "Sanctuary City: Part 4" (season 6: episode 4) "Sanctuary City: Part 5" (season 6: episode 5)
2018–2025	S.W.A.T.	John Burrows	Recurring Role
2022–present	General Hospital	Malcom	

Video Games
Year	Title	Role	Notes
2007	Vampire Rain	John Lloyd	Uncredited
