= Yvette Nipar =

American actress (born 1964)

- Born: October 20, 1964 (age 62); Los Angeles, California, U.S.
- Occupation: Actress
- Years active: 1983–2007
- Spouse: Patrick McDermott (m. 1992; div. 1993)
- Children: 1

Yvette Nipar (born 1964) is an American actress best known for such films and television series as 21 Jump Street, RoboCop: The Series, CSI: Miami, CSI: Crime Scene Investigation and Ski Patrol. She is the ex-wife of Patrick McDermott.

== Career ==
Yvette was born in Los Angeles, California. She began modeling shortly after graduating from Huntington Beach High School, then started doing commercials. She acted in many television series from 1986 to 2006. In 2007, she retired after appearing in Walking Tall: Lone Justice as Agent Kate Jensen.

== Personal life ==
She married Patrick McDermott in March 1992. They divorced in June 1993.

== Filmography ==
=== Movies ===
Year	Title	Role
1987	Terminal Entry	Tina
1987	Run If You Can	Kim
1990	Ski Patrol	Ellen
1992	Doctor Mordrid	Samantha Hunt
1998	Phantoms	Cowgirl
2000	Submerged	Agent Wendy Robbins
2001	Kept	Avery
2002	Stranded	Susan Miller
2007	Walking Tall: The Payback	Agent Kate Jensen
2007	Walking Tall: Lone Justice	Agent Kate Jensen

=== Television ===
Year	Title	Role	Notes
1986–1987	General Hospital	Sandy Stryker	
1987	Days of Our Lives	Sasha Roberts	Episode: "#1.5397"
1988	Why on Earth?	Eve	TV film
1988	Freddy's Nightmares	Nickie	Episode: "Killer Instinct"
1988	Midnight Caller	Arden	Episode: "Twelve Gauge"
1988–1989	21 Jump Street	Jackie Garrett	Episodes: "The Currency We Trade In", "Coach of the Year", "The Blu Flu", "What About Love?", "The Dreaded Return of Russell Buckins", "Fathers and Sons"
1989	Matlock	Susan McKay	Episode: "The Star"
1989	Murder, She Wrote	Cat Hudson Drake	Episode: "Trevor Hudson's Legacy"
1990	Hardball		Episode: "A Death in the Family"
1990	Full House	Christine	Episode: "Happy New Year"
1991	The Flash	Lisa March	Episode: "Tina, Is That You?"
1992	The Boys of Twilight		Episode: "Pilot"
1992	Human Target	Alena	Episode: "Mirror Image"
1993	The Adventures of Brisco County, Jr.	Ellie	Episodes: "Senior Spirit", "Pirates", "Socrates' Sister"
1994	RoboCop: The Series	Detective Lisa Madigan	
1995	Diagnosis: Murder	Rita Janson	Episode: "Playing for Keeps"
1995	Murder, She Wrote	Toni Shaw	Episode: "The Dream Team"
1996	Melrose Place	Evie Wainbridge	Episode: "Run, Billy Run"
1996	Twilight Man	Elon	TV movie
1996	Nash Bridges	Dana Trainor	Episode: "'Til Death Do Us Part"
1996	Rolling Thunder	Alex Keegan	TV movie
1996	The Sentinel	Doborah Reeves	Episode: "Light My Fire"
1997	Chicago Hope	Jill Fisher	Episode: "Sympathy for the Devil"
1998	Three		Episode: "Blink of an Eye"
1998	Brooklyn South	Undercover Officer	Episode: "Dead Man Sleeping"
1999	Party of Five	Teresa	Episode: "Rings of Saturn"
1999	Silk Stalkings	Miss Ramsdale	Episode: "It's the Great Pumpkin, Harry"
1999	Profiler	Susan Marshall	Episode: "What's Love Got to Do with It?"
2001	The District	Captain Audrey Rollins	Episodes: "A Southern Town", "The D.C. Strangler"
2001	Crossing Jordan	Sandra Babcock	Episode: "The Dawn of a New Day"
2001	Sheena	Amanda Prentiss Cutter	Episode: "Still Hostage After All These Years"
2002	Astronauts	Leslie Forsythe	TV movie
2005	CSI: Miami	Lucy Raleigh	Episode: "Killer Date"
2005	CSI: Crime Scene Investigation	Rita Day	Episode: "Secrets & Flies"
2006	In Justice	Agent Tara Fazekas	Episode: "Badge of Honor"
