= The Substitute Wife (1994 film) =

- Original advertisement
- Genre: Drama; Romance; Western
- Written by: Stan Daniels
- Directed by: Peter Werner
- Starring: Farrah Fawcett; Lea Thompson; Peter Weller
- Music by: Mark Snow
- Country of origin: United States
- Original language: English

Production
- Producer: Michael O. Gallant
- Production location: Austin, Texas
- Cinematography: Neil Roach
- Editor: Martin Nicholson
- Running time: 92 minutes
- Production companies: Frederick S. Pierce Company; Patchett Kaufman Entertainment

Original release
- Network: NBC
- Release: May 23, 1994

The Substitute Wife is a 1994 television film written by Stan Daniels, directed by Peter Werner and starring Farrah Fawcett, along with Lea Thompson and Peter Weller.

== Plot ==
In Nebraska, during the pioneer days, Amy Hightower, a farm wife, discovers that she is going to die. Fearing that her husband, Martin will be unable to cope with running the land, while raising four children, Amy decides to find him a woman, whom he will take as a new wife.

Against her husband's wishes, Amy sets off in search of a woman; to no avail, she calls upon Pearl, a prostitute, as a last resort. Pearl instantly agrees to the offer and moves into the Hightower's home. As Pearl soon begins to adapt to her new life as a mother figure, Amy suggests that Martin and Pearl become intimate with one another, despite the heartbreak it causes her. At first reluctant, Martin begins to warm to Pearl, while Amy offers to give up her place in the marital bed.

Amy's condition becomes more erratic and she makes out her will, for which she includes Pearl, whom she considers to be her best friend. As Amy and Martin continue to appear as normal man and wife, Pearl becomes confused as to how she fits in around the situation, and decides to leave, before Amy talks her out of it. The women, with Martin's approval, come up with a solution in which they agree to a polyamorous relationship.

Amy takes another turn for the worse and everyone expects her to pull together as she did before, but she passes away. The family and Pearl attend her funeral. Several years pass, and Martin and Pearl, now man and wife, are in attendance as the proud parents at Amy's eldest daughter's wedding.

== Cast ==
- Farrah Fawcett as Pearl Hickson
- Lea Thompson as Amy Hightower
- Peter Weller as Martin Hightower
- Karis Paige Bryant as Jessica (credited as Karis Bryant)
- Cory Lloyd as Nathan
- Colton Conklin as Jack
- Annie Suite as Mrs. Van Der Meer
- Babs George as Mrs. Parker
- Gena Sleete as Hattie Donahue
- Gail Cronauer as Isabel Donahue
- Lou Perryman as Saloon Keeper

== Reception ==
The Substitute Wife received generally positive reviews. Ray Loynd of the Los Angeles Times praised Stan Daniels' script, and went on to say "at times funny, daring, endearing and unpredictable, the production has the texture and flavor of Willa Cather’s Nebraska fiction — except that the values espoused in “The Substitute Wife” would shock most mortals both then and now."

In a review from Todd Everett for Variety, stated that "the story is so good-natured that women should wind up more entertained than offended by Stan Daniels' witty and ultimately touching script", which he compared to the 1950 film No Sad Songs for Me. He also praised the performances of Thompson and Fawcett's characters, which he deemed the "strongest onscreen relationship".

== Home media ==
The Substitute Wife was originally released in the United States on LaserDisc format via Vidmark Entertainment on February 8, 1995, and on DVD on September 25, 2001.
