= Walking Tall: The Payback =

- Directed by: Tripp Reed
- Written by: Joe Halpin; Brian Strasmann
- Produced by: Alison Semenza
- Starring: Kevin Sorbo; Haley Ramm
- Cinematography: Jas Shelton
- Edited by: Vanick Moradian
- Music by: David Wurst; Eric Wurst
- Production companies: Andrew Stevens Entertainment; Walking Tall Productions
- Distributed by: Sony Pictures Home Entertainment; Metro-Goldwyn-Mayer Home Entertainment
- Release date: February 13, 2007
- Running time: 88 minutes
- Country: United States
- Language: English
- Budget: $880,000

Walking Tall: The Payback is a 2007 American action-thriller film, released direct-to-video as a stand-alone sequel to the 2004 film Walking Tall. Directed by Tripp Reed, it stars Kevin Sorbo, A.J. Buckley, Haley Ramm, Bentley Mitchum, Jennifer Sipes, Brad Leland, Charles Baker and Marc Macaulay.

The film has a western theme with country and western music used in its score, representing a cliché story from western movies in a modern setting. Its main character's name is Nick Prescott, unlike the original's Buford Pusser or the remake's Chris Vaughn.

== Plot ==
Marine Veteran Nick Prescott returns to his hometown. His father, who is the sheriff, tries to stand up against a brutal gang of ruthless criminals who intimidate and blackmail the people to sell them their business. He is then killed by the gang's leader Harvey Morris. With the help of an FBI agent and a few old friends, Nick himself becomes the sheriff, then vows to do everything in his power to destroy the gang and their ruthless leader, and win back his city. Eventually he shoots Morris and his gang and becomes the new sheriff of his hometown.

== Cast ==
- Kevin Sorbo as Nick Prescott
- Haley Ramm as Samantha Jensen
- Richard Dillard as Charlie Prescott
- Gail Cronauer as Emma Prescott
- Ntokozo Mntwini as Hap Worrell
- A.J. Buckley as Harvey Morris
- Bentley Mitchum as Walter Morris
- Yvette Nipar as FBI Agent Kate Jensen
- Jennifer Sipes as Crystal Martin
- Todd Terry as Lou Dowdy
- Jerry Cotton as Traxell Byrne
- John S. Davies as Detective Pete Michaels
- Richard Nance as Frank Boggs
- Marc Macaulay as Herb Sherman
- Brad Leland as Mitch
- David Frye as Howie
- Craig Erickson as Jack Simms
- Jackson Hurst as Hank
- Charles Baker as Nate

== Controversy ==
There was some controversy before this film's release, as Dwana Pusser (daughter of Buford Pusser) released a statement on her website condemning this movie and its upcoming sequel, saying "I have read the scripts and they are very vulgar. As a Christian woman I am very upset with the direction the movies have taken."
