= Lúcio (Overwatch) =

Fictional character in the Overwatch franchise

Lúcio Correia dos Santos
- Overwatch character
- Lúcio's appearance in Overwatch
- First appearance: Overwatch (2016)
- Designed by: Arnold Tsang and David Kang
- Voiced by: Jonny Cruz

In-universe information
- Class: Support
- Origin: Rio de Janeiro, Brazil
- Nationality: Brazilian

Lúcio Correia dos Santos (/luːsiːoʊ/) is a character who first appeared in the 2016 video game Overwatch, a Blizzard Entertainment–developed first-person hero shooter, and the resulting franchise. Conceived from the desire to include a "bard"-type character in the game that could cast ability-boosting auras on their party, he was designed by Arnold Tsang and David Kang, and made Brazilian due to the country's association with music culture. Voiced by Jonny Cruz, Lúcio is a DJ and musician living in Rio de Janeiro, using his music to try and lift people's spirits. After a corporation tries to oppress and exploit his neighborhood, he steals some of the company's equipment to fight back and encourages others to join in, pushing them out. Now seen as a hero, he performs concerts worldwide and later joins reformed peacekeeping force "Overwatch" to help fight against global threat "Null Sector". Lúcio has since also appeared in another Blizzard developed title, Heroes of the Storm.

Since his introduction, he has appeared in various spinoff media related to the franchise, including a novel, merchandise, and an instrumental soundtrack called Synaesthesia Auditiva. As a character, Lúcio was well received, compared to characters from the game Jet Set Radio and heavily praised for his optimistic demeanor. Some sources have been critical of his portrayal as a black man and a Brazilian, feeling he plays into harmful stereotypes perceived against both cultures, while others have instead argued he acts as a positive symbol against such stereotypes in video games. Blizzard themselves have heavily promoted the character through various physical merchandise, such as a brand of cereal in his name, aptly titled 'Lúcio-Oh's'.

== Conception and development ==
Early designs featured stylized skull imagery on his attire; this was later changed to a stylized frog.

While developing Overwatch, the development team wanted to add a "bard"-type character to the game, inspired by the Dungeons & Dragons character class of the same name, able to cast ability-boosting auras on their party. The development team was excited by the idea of creating a music-based playable character for the game. To this end they envisioned an "upbeat and highly mobile character" whose abilities utilized light and sound, with concept artists Arnold Tsang and David Kang going through several iterations for the character.

While fleshing out the character's backstory, they settled on Brazil, feeling the country would be a good fit for Lúcio due to it being a "vivid and lively place with proud music culture." To this end, his green, blue, and yellow color scheme was meant to reference the Brazilian flag directly. In addition, while early designs of Lúcio's outfit utilized skull imagery, they switched to a stylized image of a giant monkey frog, a species found in the Amazon rainforest and typically associated with healing rituals.

Early on they considered adding turntables extending from his hips that he manipulated during gameplay, while the pants thighs acted as an equalizer. However, these elements were toned down as concept art development progressed, fearing they may be too distracting for players. While Kang designed his weapon, a speaker-based pistol, Tsang revised his physical design, creating a look the team was mostly satisfied with. However, after some felt he looked too "civilian", additional equipment was added such as leg armor and a visor "so that he felt more heroic and distinct." Kang in particular wanted to emphasize the gun's various points of movement when firing, such as the vibration of the woofer, which he described as making the weapon feel alive.

In all appearances, the character is voiced by Jonny Cruz. Originally they wanted a voice actor from Brazil that could speak Portuguese, however multiple factors caused difficulty with finding an actor with these traits. When Cruz auditioned for the role, he was provided with an image of a Latino boy with a skateboard and a description that the character was "a cool, kinda chilled dude. He was motivational and just easy-going", something Cruz found an affinity for. Senior Lore Designer Michael Chu stated that despite Cruz not being Brazilian nor speaking Portuguese, they felt he was perfect for the role and embodied what they wanted for the character, stating that his audition had "so much enthusiasm and life, there was no way Lúcio could be anyone else."

=== Design ===
Standing 5 feet 3 inches (160 cm) tall, Lúcio is an athletic black man dressed as a DJ, with a small black goatee on his chin and large brown dreadlocks that end in yellow metal caps. His outfit consists of a green tanktop, blue armored pants, blue gloves, and hard light skates. He additionally has a headset with a transparent green visor, a yellow circular backpack, and large electronic equipment resting on his hips. His gun, a speaker-based weapon held by a pistol grip, is connected to a black armband on his right arm via a long yellow cable. He additionally has a frog tattoo on his right shoulder, while his backpack and shirt are adorned with the image of a frog wearing headphones.

Like other Overwatch characters, Lúcio received skins, unlockable cosmetic items to change his in-game appearance. Of particular note, the frog mascot themed "Ribbit" skin took inspiration from electronic dance music and techno music to play into the character's musical background, while "Breakaway" resembled a heavily padded hockey player to illustrate it as the character's favorite sport. "Jazzy" on the other hand, modeled after a jazz musician, will also change the music that accompanies him. However, this particular outfit also received criticism from players, who felt it was overdesigned.

In response to criticism about his hair, Blizzard Entertainment revealed during the development of Overwatch 2 that Lúcio's "hair" was actually a foam loc headpiece worn for his role as a DJ, in the same vein as Daft Punk or Deadmau5's headwear. After consulting cultural hair experts, they gave him more natural and textured dreadlocks that glowed green to still fit into his DJ role, inspired by the wigs commonly seen in cybergoth culture.

== Appearances ==
Lúcio Correia dos Santos is a black Brazilian man from Rio de Janeiro, first appearing in the 2016 first-person shooter Overwatch and later its sequel. To counter the financial crisis of his area, he turned to music to lift up the spirits of his disheartened people by performing on street corners and at block parties. When the Vishkar Corporation, a multinational conglomerate, moved in to redevelop Rio, they enacted curfews and exploited citizens as cheap labor. Stealing and weaponizing Vishkar's equipment, he rallied the people to rise up and drive Vishkar out of their neighborhoods. His leadership made him a global celebrity, and he began to perform in filled arenas worldwide. In Overwatch 2, due to the global threat from militant group "Null Sector", he joins the now-reformed global peacekeeping force "Overwatch" to help.

In 2016, a seasonal game mode was added to Overwatch as part of its "Summer Games" event called Lúcioball, a soccer-themed mode in which all players play as Lúcio and try to push a ball into the opposing team's goal. A competitive version was later added in 2017, while another version called Remix was added in 2020 featuring multiple balls on the field at once. Outside of the two games, Lúcio was added as a playable character to Heroes of the Storm in 2017. He is additionally featured in the 2020 Overwatch tie-in novel The Hero of Numbani, befriending protagonist Efi and her creation Orisa, and later helping them thwart villain Doomfist's attacks on Numbani. In 2026, Lúcio was one of several characters included in Overwatch Rush, a mobile game developed by Blizzard.

=== Gameplay ===
In Overwatch, Lúcio is classified as a Support-class character, meant to provide aid for his team. His main weapon, a Sonic Amplifier, is a burst fire weapon that fires projectiles to damage enemies. Lúcio has several passive abilities as well: "Wall Ride", which allows him to skate along walls and jump off them for a momentary boost of speed, and "Crossfade", which can be toggled to provide a movement speed increase or healing to nearby allies. In addition, he has two abilities that require activation, though have a "cooldown" period after use and are unable to be used again during that duration. The first, "Soundwave", fires a short range area of effect attack that will push, or "boop", enemies away from Lúcio and possibly off ledges. Meanwhile, the ability "Amp It Up" will boost the effects of Crossfade for a short time.

Lastly his Ultimate ability, "Sound Barrier", needs to be charged before use. The ability charges slowly during the course of gameplay, and can be charged faster through damage dealt to the enemy team or healing provided to allies. Once full the ability can be activated to make Lúcio leap into the air and slam his gun downward, creating a shockwave that provides a short-term maximum health boost to allies. Game Director Geoff Goodman noted that it went through multiple iterations, with it initially intended to slow down time around the player, able to reflect projectiles and push enemies. A later version of it had it charge the Ultimate abilities of his allies instead.

For Heroes of the Storm, most of his abilities remained unchanged. However, he gained an alternative option to Sound Barrier called "Reverse Amp", which when activated slows or damages enemies within Crossfade's area of effect for a short duration, while also extending the duration of Amp It Up. In the March 26, 2019 patch, Lúcio received a rework that replaced Reverse Amp with a new heroic ability called "High Five", allowing him to skate to an ally to heal them and make them briefly immune to negative effects. He also gained a new ability called "Push Off", letting him perform a short dash while using Wall Ride.

== Promotion and merchandise ==
Lúcio was first unveiled to the public at the 2015 Gamescom event, introduced via a stream at which several of the developers discussed the character and other additions to the game at that time. The character was further promoted through material such as a cosplay guide and promotional images themed around holidays. Additional merchandise has included action figures, Funko Pops, and a Nendoroid of the character. In late 2018, Blizzard also distributed "Lúcio-Ohs" breakfast cereal through Kellogg's, inspired by one of Lúcio's in-game decorative "spray" cosmetic graphics. The cereal itself was also part of a promotion for Overwatch's then-implemented loot box system, giving players an additional random chance to acquire cosmetic items.

In 2015, Blizzard released an article promoting an instrumental music album "by the character" called Synaesthesia Auditiva. Composed by Derek Duke, two of the tracks were released on their website, consisting of the two tracks that play for Lúcio's Crossfade passive ability. A vinyl record copy containing the pair was additionally released as part of a press kit for Overwatch by TakeOff Studios. To promote his addition to Heroes of the Storm, Blizzard released a third track in 2017 on their Twitter. The full album was later released during Blizzcon 2018 as downloadable tracks on a separate website, and later on iTunes in 2019.

== Critical reception ==
Lúcio was well received upon release. Comparing him to characters from the game Jet Set Radio, Chris Breault of Kill Screen stated that Lúcio's "sunny outlook" optimism seemed to border on mania, but felt at the same time that was what made the character great in his eyes. GamesRadar+ writer Connor Sheridan also praised the character's design optimism, enjoying how much of a departure it was from frequently displayed first-person shooter heroes. He noted that while few Overwatch characters fit the typical "career soldier" archetype of the genre, he "may be the furthest from it [...] Lúcio knows he's got it good right now, and he wants to share that with the rest of his team." Guilherme Pedrosa Carvalho de Araújo and Gleislla Soares Monteiro in the Brazilian journal Revista Sistemas e Mídias Digitais praised the character's departure from typical portrayals of black men in video games who often try to better the world through violence, instead utilizing music and its restorative nature. While they did note that dancers were common stereotypes associated with both black and Latino characters, his use served as a force of resistance and strengthening his community, pushing back against "imperialism and the verticalization of power."

Other sources found issues with his design however. Owen S. Good of Polygon in particular stated he looked like "the token member" of a fast food chain [...] He looks like a bionic BK Kid." He additionally felt Lúcio's "guy with the dreadlocks is a DJ" design was a negative trope, and considered him a step down in terms of design compared to the other character in Overwatch. Ash Parrish in an article for The Verge noted that while Lúcio was her favorite character in the game, she emphasized how unrealistic his "hair" looked in the first Overwatch, and discussed on how many developers fail when it comes to the lack of texture on hair for black characters, though admitted she was pleased such concerns were acknowledged in later designs. Kotaku's Gita Jackson on the other hand voiced concern for how the character was portrayed as an athlete and a musician, noting it was not about the character's roles but the frequency in which black men were often stereotyped as such in American media to illustrate perceptions of their "strength and stamina and creativity".

The subject of Lúcio as representative of Brazilian culture however was a bit more divisive. Érika Caramello and Cláudia Hardagh in a paper for the journal Teccogs: Revista Digital de Tecnologias Cognitivas cited him as an example of how the culture's identity was stereotypically displayed in gaming, in particular the use of music and dance as well as his large dreadlocks and color scheme referencing the country's flag. On the other hand, Daisyane Barreto and Lucas John Jensen in a paper titled Using Cultural Representations in Video Games to Confront Stereotypes and Misconceptions About Brazil praised Lúcio as an example that ran contrary to stereotypes of what it meant to be Brazilian, or "Brasilidade", with the exception of his soccer background being an emphasized part of his character.
