= Positive I.D. =

- Theatrical release poster
- Directed by: Andy Anderson
- Screenplay by: Andy Anderson
- Produced by: Andy Anderson
- Starring: Stephanie Rascoe Myers; John S. Davies; Steven Fromholz; Lauren Lane; Gail Cronauer; Matthew Sacks
- Cinematography: Paul Barton
- Edited by: Andy Anderson; Robert J. Castaldo
- Music by: Steven Jay Hoey
- Production company: Andersonfilm
- Distributed by: Universal Pictures
- Release date: October 27, 1987
- Running time: 95 minutes
- Country: United States
- Language: English
- Budget: $200,000

Positive I.D. is a 1987 American crime film written and directed by Andy Anderson. The film stars Stephanie Rascoe Myers, John S. Davies, Steven Fromholz, Lauren Lane, Gail Cronauer and Matthew Sacks. The film was released on October 27, 1987, by Universal Pictures.

== Plot ==
Julie Kenner had been raped a year ago and is still psychologically suffering. She repels her husband Don, takes a lot of tranquilizers and is regularly seeing a psychiatrist. When Dana, a charming neighbor, suggests rape was "every woman's fantasy" and there must have been some point at which she enjoyed it, Julie physically lashes out at her, further alienating her from her husband and friends.

Her situation is worsened by her learning that her rapist Vinnie DeStephano has cut a deal to be released from prison. She accidentally learns that it's technically possible to assume the identity of a dead person and finds in this idea a way to recover. While she continues to spend most of her time as a recovering Julie in front of her husband, she creates the identity of Bobbie King, a vivacious red-haired woman from Florida, using a dead child's birth certificate and getting herself arrested and released on a bad-check charge to create a criminal record (and paper trail) for her alter ego. As Bobbie, she hangs out at Vinnie's uncle's bar downtown, where Roy Mercer works and befriends her. One night, they have rough sex in a hotel, suggesting that Mercer may have a deeper knowledge about her than he's letting on. Meanwhile, as Julie spends more time away from home as Bobbie, Dana fills the void in taking care of her two little girls (and her husband).

The day Vinnie is released from prison, she walks into the bar as Bobbie. As the owner tries to introduce them and Vinnie says "Don't I know you from somewhere?" she shoots Vinnie dead and walks away and drives home. The next morning, news coverage states that a "positive I.D." has been made of Vinnie's killer as Bobbie King, the wanted check-kiter from Florida. In a TV interview, Mercer is revealed to be an undercover detective, and tells the press Bobbie is a professional assassin who will never get caught. Reporters track Julie down in front of her house to ask if she feels vindicated by Vinnie's death, she says no and flees inside. When she kisses her children awake, they initially call out "Aunt Dana" instead.

The final scene is her dressed as Bobbie, stepping into a phone booth at a truck stop. A semi truck pulls up, leaves, and the phone booth is empty.

== Cast ==
- Stephanie Rascoe Myers as Julie Kenner / Bobbie King
- John S. Davies as Don Kenner
- Steven Fromholz as Roy Mercer
- Lauren Lane as Dana
- Gail Cronauer as Melissa
- Matthew Sacks as Mr. Tony
- Audeen Casey as Dr. Sterling
- Steven Jay Hoey as Johnny
- Erin White as Katie Kenner
- Terry Leeser as Vinnie DeStephano
- Steve Garrett as Clerk at Vital Statistics
- Dottie Mandel as Woman at Maildrop
- James Buchanan as Pawnbroker
- William Spurlock as Mr. Bernard
- Tim Hatcher as Bill Duncan
- Raul Flores as Gino
