= Disappearance of Patrick McDermott =

American cameraman (born 1956)

Patrick McDermott
- Born: Kim Chong-nam; September 18, 1956; Seoul, South Korea
- Disappeared: 30 June 2005 (aged 48); Off the coast of Los Angeles, California
- Status: Missing for 21 years, 4 months and 21 days
- Occupation: Cameraman
- Known for: Relationship with Olivia Newton-John, mysterious disappearance
- Spouse: Yvette Nipar (m. 1992; div. 1994)
- Partner: Olivia Newton-John (c. 1996–2005)
- Children: 1

Patrick Kim McDermott (born September 18, 1956 – disappeared June 30, 2005) was a Korean-American cameraman who disappeared on June 30, 2005, while on an overnight fishing trip off the coast of Los Angeles, California. He was the on-and-off boyfriend of singer-actress Olivia Newton-John. The United States Coast Guard concluded that he was likely lost at sea. Since his disappearance, unsubstantiated claims have been made, particularly in the Australian media, that McDermott faked his own death and is still alive in Mexico.

== Personal life ==
McDermott was born in Seoul, South Korea, on September 18, 1956. According to McDermott, he believed he was born to a Korean mother and an American father. He was placed for adoption by his mother and subsequently adopted by an American family when he was two years old. According to his adoption card, his birth name was Kim Chong-nam. McDermott married the actress Yvette Nipar in 1992 and divorced around 1994. They have a son, Chance McDermott. McDermott had filed for bankruptcy in 2000 and had received a court order to pay overdue child support to his former wife. He had been in an on–off relationship with Olivia Newton-John for around 9 years prior to his disappearance. At the time that Olivia met him, McDermott was working as a lighting designer.

== Disappearance ==
McDermott disappeared from a fishing charter boat off San Pedro, Los Angeles, on June 30, 2005. He was a passenger on the fishing boat Freedom which had left from the San Pedro marina for a 22-hour overnight fishing trip. McDermott was a frequent client of overnight fishing trips. He booked the trip solo, and he did not know any of the other 22 passengers or crew. There was no headcount on the boat when the passengers disembarked. Some of his personal belongings, including his car keys, passport, and wallet, were found on the boat, and his car was found parked near the marina where he had left it. His absence was apparently unnoticed until July 6, 2005, when he failed to attend a family event. He was reported missing on July 11, but the story did not gain widespread press coverage until a month later. A Coast Guard Investigative Service case was closed on September 15, 2006, and "did not find any evidence of criminal action, suicide, accident or hoax in the disappearance of McDermott." A separate United States Coast Guard marine safety investigation, looking into the conduct of the fishing vessel, closed on October 30, 2008. Both investigations concluded that McDermott was likely lost at sea.

== Speculative whereabouts ==
Since McDermott's disappearance, there has been unsubstantiated speculation that he faked his own death. The case was featured on America's Most Wanted. In a 2009 feature on Dateline NBC, investigators went undercover to look for him in Mexico, where they believed he might be hiding. The investigators claimed McDermott disappeared to avoid debts, including US$8,000 owed to his ex-wife for child support. Those same investigators created the website FindPatrickMcDermott.com for the sole purpose of trapping McDermott. As the Dateline special showed, all visitors' web addresses were logged and mapped. The Dateline investigators believed in 2009 that McDermott was living in a boat off the west coast of Mexico. They continued to track hits to their website. The Dateline investigators said there were over 20 sightings of McDermott in Mexico and Central America.

In January 2009, investigators alleged he is alive and well in Mexico, and asking to be left alone.

In April 2009, a man Dateline hired to find McDermott, Philip Klein, released the following statement:

Since the airing of the Dateline NBC story and the media coverage of this story from around the world—we the investigators in the case would like to say "thank you" to all of you from around the world that have helped us track Mr. McDermott down. Our team cannot ever say enough thanks to the people and governments of the United States, Mexico, Brazil and Panama. As well, INTERPOL and other federal agencies that has communicated and assisted us in this case.

On February 10, 2009, our firm received a fax from a small city in Mexico near Acapulco in the State of Guerrero of the Pacific coast.

After investigating the letter sent to us by fax—we began to investigate its origin. Since that time we have been in phone contact with a 'representative' of McDermott. We find this 'representative' credible.

We are currently in negotiations with this 'representative' and will make an announcement when necessary. Please understand that we are using all caution due to the current issues Mexico is facing and the safety of our staff. As well, we ask all of you, including the media to remember there is a young man out there that would like firm and clear answers to why his father went missing. Please keep him in your thoughts.

We will make a formal statement and announcement through our friends at NBC Dateline at the proper time.

After years of searching for the missing man, a group of private investigators hired by Dateline NBC were alleged to have located McDermott alive and living in Mexico in April 2010. The private investigators, led by Texas-based Philip Klein, claimed to have tracked McDermott down after noticing that a collection of centralized IP addresses were logging onto the website that followed his presumed whereabouts.

The addresses led the investigators to the Mexican-Pacific coast near Puerto Vallarta, where they claimed McDermott had been living under his birth name, Pat Kim.

However, McDermott's ex-wife, Yvette Nipar, disputes Klein's claim that McDermott is alive. In March 2012, she wrote to Amazon CEO Jeff Bezos, and asked him to stop promoting Klein's book, Lost At Sea. Nipar said Klein is a "well-known serial liar (who) is simply looking to be famous at the expense of an unfortunate tragedy in our lives." Nipar said although Klein repeatedly promised he would prove McDermott was alive, he "never provided anything whatsoever" as proof of life. "My son has been through enough emotional torment over this," Nipar wrote. "He has yet to be able to move on due to Mr. Klein's continual effort to keep him in the public eye."

In 2016, more than a decade after his mysterious disappearance, the Australian weekly magazine Woman's Day claimed investigators found McDermott healthy and alive in the town of Sayulita, Mexico—where they purported that he lived with his new girlfriend. None of the claims were ever substantiated.

On November 7, 2017, The Independent reported that New Idea, a long-running Australian weekly magazine, claimed it had evidence McDermott is alive after receiving photos by US media agency Coleman-Rayner which show a man who matched his description alongside a woman. On January 2, 2018, the Canadian Broadcasting Corporation published a story of a man from Manitoba, Canada, who identified himself and his wife as the subject of the photo from the 2017 Australian tabloid, as a case of mistaken identification.

== See also ==
- List of people who disappeared mysteriously at sea
