= Francisco Burgos =

American actor and R&B singer

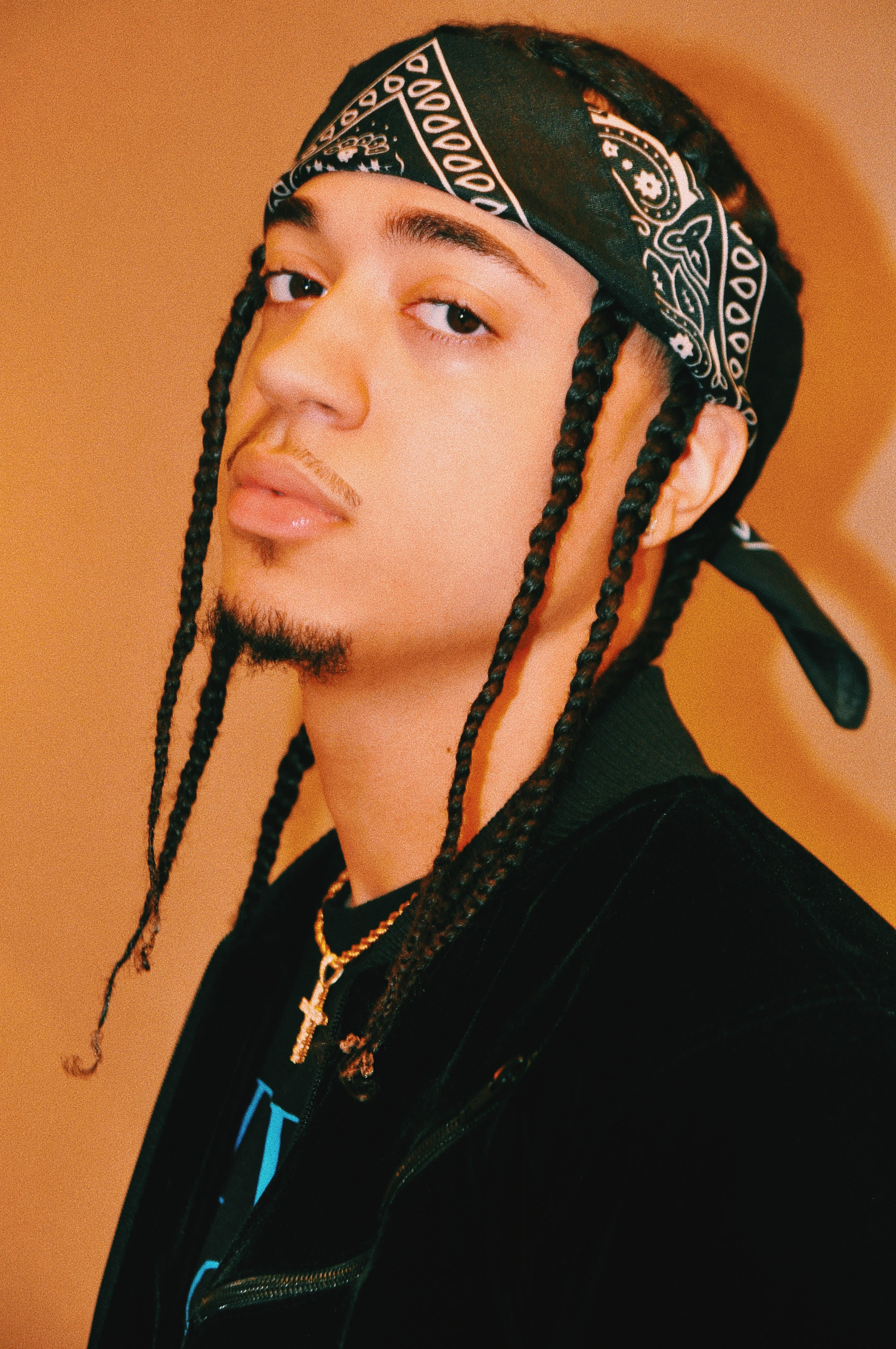
- Francisco Burgos, 2020
- Born: December 7, 1999 (age 26); The Bronx, New York
- Occupations: Actor; Singer
- Years active: 2006–present

Francisco Burgos (born 7 December 1999) is a New York based American actor. He made his first major movie appearance in Explicit Ills directed by Mark Webber in 2008.

== Career ==
Burgos was born and raised in The Bronx, New York. In his first lead role, Burgos starred as ‘Babo’ – a young kid with asthma in the film Explicit Ills.

== Filmography ==
=== Film ===
- Explicit Ills (2008)
