= Walking Tall: Lone Justice =

- Directed by: Tripp Reed
- Written by: Joe Halpin; Brian Strasmann
- Produced by: Andrew Stevens
- Starring: Kevin Sorbo; Haley Ramm; Jennifer Sipes
- Cinematography: Jas Shelton
- Edited by: Vanick Moradian
- Music by: David Wurst; Eric Wurst
- Production companies: Andrew Stevens Entertainment; Walking Tall Productions
- Distributed by: Sony Pictures Home Entertainment
- Release date: September 25, 2007
- Running time: 95 minutes
- Country: United States
- Language: English

Walking Tall: Lone Justice is a 2007 American action film and direct-to-video sequel to 2004's Walking Tall and Walking Tall: The Payback, the film was directed by Tripp Reed and stars Kevin Sorbo, Haley Ramm and Jennifer Sipes.

== Plot ==
It has been a year since Nick Prescott became the sheriff of Boone, Texas, and cleaned up the town. Now, he is moving to Dallas so he can be with his FBI agent fiancée Kate Jensen and her 12-year-old daughter Samantha. Currently, Kate is one of the many people working to put away Octavio Perez, the biggest drug kingpin in the central states. When the two main witnesses against Perez are killed by his men in a safe-house, the testimony of Kate and three other investigators, including Lt. Doug Maxwell, becomes the only way to put Perez away.

They are lodged in another safe-house to wait for the trial, but the place is invaded by Perez's men, and two of the agents are executed, leaving Kate and Maxwell alive, but Kate is in critical condition. Nick believes that there is a traitor who is leaking the safe house locations to Perez's men. Nick saves Kate from an attempt on her life at the hospital, and takes Kate and Samantha to his ranch in Boone, where Kate can continue to recover, with Nick's mother Emma helping to watch over her and Nick has some of his friends watching over the ranch to make sure no one gets to Kate, Emma, and Samantha.

After Kate wakes up and is up to walking around, she looks back on when she was shot, and she remembers something that leads her to realize that Maxwell is the traitor. After Maxwell and some of Perez's men kidnap Nick, along with Kate's boss, Marcia Tunney, Perez and his men get the location of the ranch, and leave to go after Kate. Perez's girlfriend Ramona, who has cut off two of Tunney's fingers in order to get information from her, is left behind, and after Nick frees himself, he distracts Ramona long enough for Tunney to kill her.

Nick tells Tunney that he will send her some help, and then he races to the ranch, and he gets there before Perez and his men do. Perez and his men arrive, and gunfire erupts. All of Perez's men are killed, and Kate fatally shoots Perez. Maxwell chases Samantha into the woods, and grabs her. Nick chases Maxwell, and he finds Maxwell holding his gun to Samantha's head. Samantha, who knows Taekwondo, escapes from Maxwell, and Nick kills Maxwell by shooting him twice. Kate recovers, and she and Nick are still together.

== Cast ==
- Kevin Sorbo as Nick Prescott
- Yvette Nipar as FBI Agent Kate Jensen
- Haley Ramm as Samantha Jensen
- Elizabeth Barondes as FBI Agent Marcia Tunney
- Rodrigo de la Rosa as Octavio Pérez
- Christina Hearn as Ramona
- Jonny Cruz as Ciro
- Mark W. Johnson as Lieutenant Doug Maxwell
- Benjamin Burdick as FBI Agent Russell
- Gail Cronauer as Emma Prescott
- Jennifer Sipes as Crystal Martin
- Jackson Hurst as Hank
- Merk Harbour as Art
- Timothy Vahle as John Bishop
- Andrew Stevens as Andrew Davis
- Lawrence Varnado as Anderson
- Michael Crabtree as Stevens
- Edgar Arreola as Ruiz
- Víctor Quintero as Hector
- Russell Towery as FBI Agent Clark
- Riley Chambers as Dallas Police Officer and Juror

== Production ==
The film was mostly shot in Dallas, Texas, US

== Comments on the film ==
There were some comments by Dwana Pusser (daughter of Buford Pusser) who released a statement on her website condemning the previous sequel and this film, saying "I have read the scripts and they are very vulgar. As a Christian woman, I am very upset with the direction [that] the movies have taken."
