= Exit Speed =

- Film poster
- Directed by: Scott Ziehl
- Written by: Michael Stokes
- Produced by: Sally Helppie; Michael Stokes
- Starring: Fred Ward; Desmond Harrington; Lea Thompson; Julie Mond; Alice Greczyn; Gregory Jbara; David Rees Snell
- Cinematography: Thomas L. Callaway
- Edited by: Matt Coleman
- Music by: Cole Freeman
- Distributed by: Phase 4 Films
- Release date: December 12, 2008
- Running time: 90 minutes
- Country: United States
- Language: English

Exit Speed is a 2008 action film by Sabbatical Pictures. The film was directed by Scott Ziehl, and stars Desmond Harrington, Julie Mond, Lea Thompson, Alice Greczyn, David Rees Snell and Fred Ward. The 90-minute action film was shown at the Cannes Film Market in 2008. The film was made in the Dallas, Texas area, where it premiered. It was released to theaters in the Southwest in September 2008. The film is a low-budget production that was noted for the presence of motorcycles.

== Plot ==
In Texas, Sergeant Archie Sparks, an MP, has finally caught up with AWOL Corporal Meredith Cole, who has been accused of assaulting a commanding officer. When Archie turns his back for a moment, Meredith manages to escape his custody once again.

Cole finds herself on an American Auto Coach bus on her way to El Paso, along with an eclectic group of passengers for what should be an uneventful ride on Christmas Eve. The bus passes a group of meth-addicted, nomadic bikers who taunt the passengers by performing stunts around the bus. One of the bikers makes a mistake and ends up being run over by bus, resulting in the rest of the bikers seeking revenge. The driver, Danny Gunn stops the bus to help, and when he gets out, one of the bikers murders by shooting his brain, stray shots also wound Meredith and passenger Joey Ryan.

Another passenger, Jerry Yarbro, a high school football coach who was accused of assaulting a student, retrieves the biker's weapon, while Walter Lindley, another passenger, retrieves Danny's keys. The surviving passengers drive away in the bus in an effort to get away from the bikers. They try to call the police but there's no service. As they flee down the highway, Joey dies from her injuries.

The rest of the passengers include single mother Maudie McMinn, moody, wayward father Sam Cutter, tough woman Desiree, her extremely skittish boyfriend Duke, Annabel Drake, a vegan who happens to be a competitive archer and Ramon Vargas, a Spanish-speaking electrician.

At Jerry's insistence, they take the bus down a side road. The bikers force the bus off the road at an abandoned junkyard, where the bus rams a boat and crashes, killing Walter. The passengers build a makeshift bunker that the bikers surround. And Jerry, who seems to have anger management issues, still has the gun. The group is now on the defensive against the vengeful bikers. But they realize that in order to survive, they must go on the offensive and fight back against the bikers.

That evening, they make a plan to hold out in the junkyard while Maudie, (a marathoner), crosses 20 miles of desert to reach the nearest town for help. As the remaining survivors fight back with captured guns, Annabel's target bow, and Ramon's jury-rigged cannon, Maudie gets away from the compound. Maudie meets up with Archie, and they kill some of the bikers.

The two make it back to the compound during the middle of the confrontation, in which the remaining bikers injure Ramon and kill Duke, Desiree, and Jerry. After the remaining bikers are killed, the survivors—Sam, Meredith, Annabel, and Ramon—are driven to the nearest town by Maudie and Archie.

Later, at a hospital, Maudie reunites with her daughters, and Meredith again evades the army, this time with Archie's help. Meredith joins Sam and Annabel as they head back out on the road in a minivan.

== Cast ==
- Desmond Harrington as Sam Cutter
- Lea Thompson as Maudie McMinn
- Julie Mond as Corporal Meredith Cole
- Alice Greczyn as Annabel Drake
- Fred Ward as Sgt. Archibald "Archie" Sparks
- Gregory Jbara as Coach Jerry Yarbro
- David Rees Snell as Danny Gunn
- Kelli Dawn Hancock as Desiree
- Nick Sowell as Duke
- Everett Sifuentes as Ramon Emancio Eladio Vargas
- Wally White as Walter Lindley
- Danielle Beacham as Joey Ryan
- Asante Jones as Sheriff Tom Jasper
- Roy Samuelson as Vic Towbridge (Meredith's one-night stand)
