= Walking Tall =

Walking Tall may refer to:

- Walking Tall (1973 film), a 1973 film
- Walking Tall Part 2, (a.k.a. The Legend of Buford Pusser), a 1975 sequel to Walking Tall
- Walking Tall: Final Chapter, a 1977 sequel to Walking Tall Part 2.
- A Real American Hero (film), a 1978 made-for-television remake of Walking Tall (1973).
- Walking Tall (TV series), a 1981 television series adaptation of the films of the same name
- Walking Tall (2004 film), a remake of the 1973 film of the same name
- Walking Tall: The Payback, a 2007 sequel to the 2004 film Walking Tall
- Walking Tall: Lone Justice, a 2007 sequel to Walking Tall: The Payback

== See also ==
- Walk Tall (disambiguation)
- Standing Tall (disambiguation)
