= Stand Tall =

Stand Tall may refer to:

- "Stand Tall" (Burton Cummings song), 1976
- "Stand Tall" (Bahjat song), 2015
- "Stand Tall" (Childish Gambino song), 2016
- Stand Tall (film), a 1997 bodybuilding documentary
- Stand Tall, a 2002 novel by Joan Bauer

== See also ==
- Standing Tall (disambiguation)
- Walking Tall (1973 film)
