= Walking Tall (TV series) =

1981 American TV series

- Genre: Drama
- Written by: Lee Sheldon
- Starring: Bo Svenson; Walter Barnes; Harold Sylvester; Courtney Pledger; Jeff Lester; Heather McAdam; Rad Daly
- Composer: Edd Kalehoff
- Country of origin: United States
- Original language: English
- No. of seasons: 1
- No. of episodes: 7

Production
- Executive producer: David Gerber
- Producer: Mel Swope
- Production location: Newhall, Santa Clarita, California
- Cinematography: William Gereghty
- Editors: Bob Fish; Richard Freeman; Rod Stephens
- Running time: 60 min
- Production company: David Gerber Company Inc.

Original release
- Network: NBC
- Release: January 17 – June 6, 1981

Related
- Walking Tall (1973 film); A Real American Hero (1978 TV film)

Walking Tall is an American television drama series that ran on NBC in 1981. It was a continuation of the 1973 film Walking Tall, which was based on the life of McNairy County Sheriff Buford Pusser. In this series, Pusser is the sheriff of the fictionalized McNeal County, Tennessee, fighting criminals each week in 1969.

The theme song "Walking Tall" was sung by Brad Mercer.

== Cast ==
Bo Svenson played Pusser, whom he had played before in Walking Tall Part 2 (1975) and Walking Tall: Final Chapter (1977). (Brian Dennehy played Pusser in A Real American Hero in 1978 on CBS).

The rest of the cast included:

- Walter Barnes as Carl Pusser
- Harold Sylvester as Deputy Aaron Fairfax
- Courtney Pledger as Deputy Joan Litton
- Jeff Lester as Deputy Grady Spooner
- Heather McAdam as Dwanna Pusser
- Rad Daly as Michael Pusser

L. Q. Jones appeared in one segment as John Witter, Pusser's long-time nemesis.

Guest stars included Robert Englund, William Windom, Chuck Connors, Merlin Olsen, Ralph Bellamy, Gail Strickland, James MacArthur, and Art Hindle.

At the time, Svenson was the highest-paid actor in a television series.

== Broadcast history ==
The series ran on NBC in 1981 for one season of seven episodes. The first 5 episodes aired Saturday nights at 9:00 p.m. (opposite the ABC series The Love Boat). The last 2 episodes aired Tuesday nights at 10:00 p.m. (opposite ABC's Hart to Hart). NBC reran all 7 episodes from April–June 1981.

== Episodes ==
No.	Title	Directed by	Written by	Original release date
1	"The Killing of McNeal County's Children"	Alf Kjellin	Stephen Downing	17 January 1981
Set in 1969, Sheriff Buford Pusser investigates when two teenagers are hospitalized after smoking potent PCP cigarettes. Guest Star: Robert Englund (Bobby Joe Wilson).
2	"The Protectors of the People"	Daniel Haller	Donald R. Boyle	24 January 1981
Racial tensions inflame in McNeal County when three Ku Klux Klan members impersonate black men and attack a white girl. Guest Star: William Windom (Matthew Whittaker).
3	"Kidnapped"	John Florea	Paul Savage	31 January 1981
Bank robbers take Sheriff Pusser's father hostage. Guest star: Chuck Connors (Theo Brewster).
4	"Hitman"	Alf Kjellin	Robert E. Swanson	7 February 1981
Sheriff Pusser goes against his childhood friend, now a paid assassin assigned to murder Buford. Guest Stars: Merlin Olsen (Webb McClain), L.Q. Jones (John Whitter).
5	"Company Town"	Harvey S. Laidman	Lee Sheldon	14 February 1981
Sheriff Pusser investigates the disappearance of a miner who has inflamed his bosses with vocal complaints about low wages and unsafe working conditions. Guest Stars: Ralph Bellamy (Jim Clausen), Art Hindle (Stuart Clausen), Lane Bradbury (Kate Reeder), Claude Earl Jones (Carl Franklin), Russell Wiggins (Ray Hall).
6	"Deadly Impact"	Alexander Singer	Gregory S. Dinallo	24 March 1981
After an old friend is murdered by chemical company workers dumping excess toxic waste, Sheriff Pusser teams up with a whistle-blowing company employee to solve the case. Guest Stars: Gail Strickland (Lynn Hudson), James Whitmore Jr. (Tom Coleman), Ken Swofford (Ed Morgan). Aired Tuesday night at 10:00.
7	"The Fire Within"	Phil Bondelli	Lee Sheldon	31 March 1981
Sheriff Pusser butts heads with an idealistic priest who learns of a gunrunning ring during confession, but whose vows prevent him from sharing his knowledge with the law. Guest Stars: James MacArthur (Father Adair), Ed Nelson (Edwin Campbell). Aired Tuesday night at 10:00.

== Home release ==
Sony Pictures Home Entertainment released the entire series on DVD in Region 1 on March 7, 2006.
