= State Line Mob =

Association of criminals by the Mississippi–Tennessee line in the 1950s-60s

The State Line Mob was an association of criminal elements that operated in the 1950s and 1960s at the Mississippi–Tennessee state line in Alcorn County, Mississippi, and McNairy County, Tennessee, along U.S. Route 45. The State Line Mob was involved in bootlegging, gambling, prostitution, tourist fleecing, robbery, and murder. A few of the members were from Phenix City, Alabama, having been displaced from that town when martial law was declared by the Governor and the Alabama National Guard attempted to clean the town up.

The organization owned and operated motels, restaurants, and clubs at the Mississippi–Tennessee state line and in the northern portion of Alcorn County, just north of Corinth, Mississippi. These establishments were centers for every form of vice and reaped hundreds of thousands of dollars from sales of illegal moonshine and other contraband products.

The State Line Mob gained national attention throughout the 1960s for its ongoing feud with famed McNairy County Sheriff Buford Pusser. The film Walking Tall and its sequels were based on Pusser's war against the State Line Mob and other criminal elements.

== See also ==
- Dixie Mafia
- Cornbread Mafia
