= A. J. Holloway =

American politician

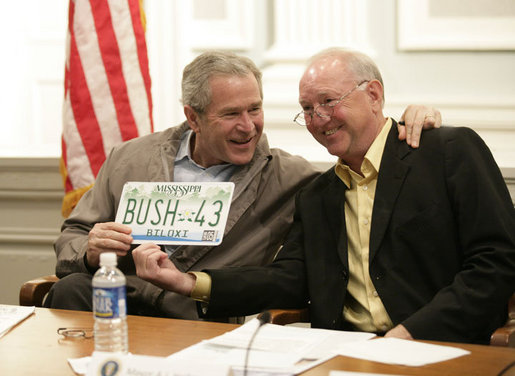
- Holloway with President George W. Bush in 2007

Mayor of Biloxi, Mississippi
- In office 1993 – July 1, 2015
- Preceded by: Pete Halat
- Succeeded by: Andrew "FoFo" Gilich

Member of the Biloxi City Council from Ward 3
- In office 1989–1993

Personal details
- Born: April 17, 1939 Biloxi, Mississippi, U.S.
- Died: June 5, 2018 (aged 79) Biloxi, Mississippi, U.S.
- Party: Republican
- Education: University of Mississippi

A.J. Holloway (April 17, 1939 – June 5, 2018) was an American politician, who served as the first Republican Mayor of Biloxi, Mississippi, from 1993 to 2015. He also played college football for the 1960 national champion Ole Miss Rebels.

== Early years ==
Holloway was educated in the Biloxi public schools and graduated from the University of Mississippi, where he played on the Ole Miss football team which went to two Sugar Bowls, a Cotton Bowl, and won share of the National Championship in 1960.

== Political career ==
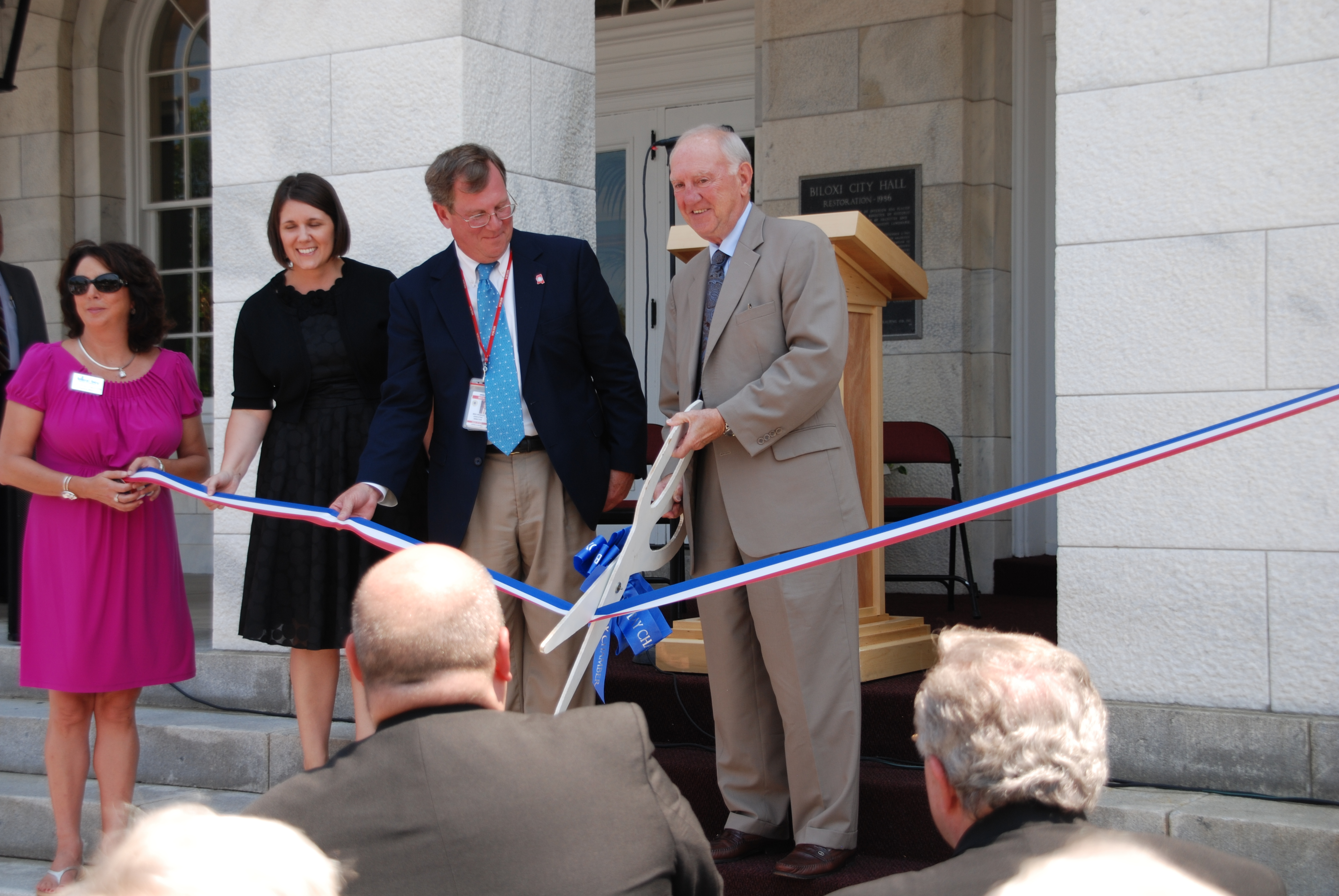
Holloway at a ribbon cutting ceremony in 2010

Prior to his election as mayor, Holloway worked at the Mississippi Tax Commission for 12 years, reaching the position of senior revenue agent, and served one term on the Biloxi City Council, representing Ward 3. In June 1993, Holloway defeated controversial incumbent Pete Halat in a three-way race by just 17 votes out of 8,584 total cast after the final tally was posted. During his term as mayor, he oversaw the direct financial benefit to Biloxi from casino gambling that was introduced to the area in 1992.

=== Hurricane Katrina ===
On August 29, 2005, Hurricane Katrina hit Biloxi causing massive damage and loss of life. Summarizing the devastation in Biloxi left behind by Katrina, Holloway told The Sun Herald, "This is our tsunami."

=== Hopes for the future ===
As mayor, Holloway envisioned as many as 20 casino resorts in Biloxi in 10 years, and as many as 30,000 hotel rooms and 30,000 employees in the casino resort industry. His "Reviving the Renaissance" initiative also promised improvements in areas such as affordable housing, historic preservation, public safety and public education.

Holloway said in 2004 and again in 2007: "Future generations are going to look back on this chapter in our history as a time when we made the right decisions ... when we cherished and protected our culture... and we did things to improve and enhance our quality of life. They're going to see this as an historic time."
