= Forrest Tucker =

American actor (1919–1986)

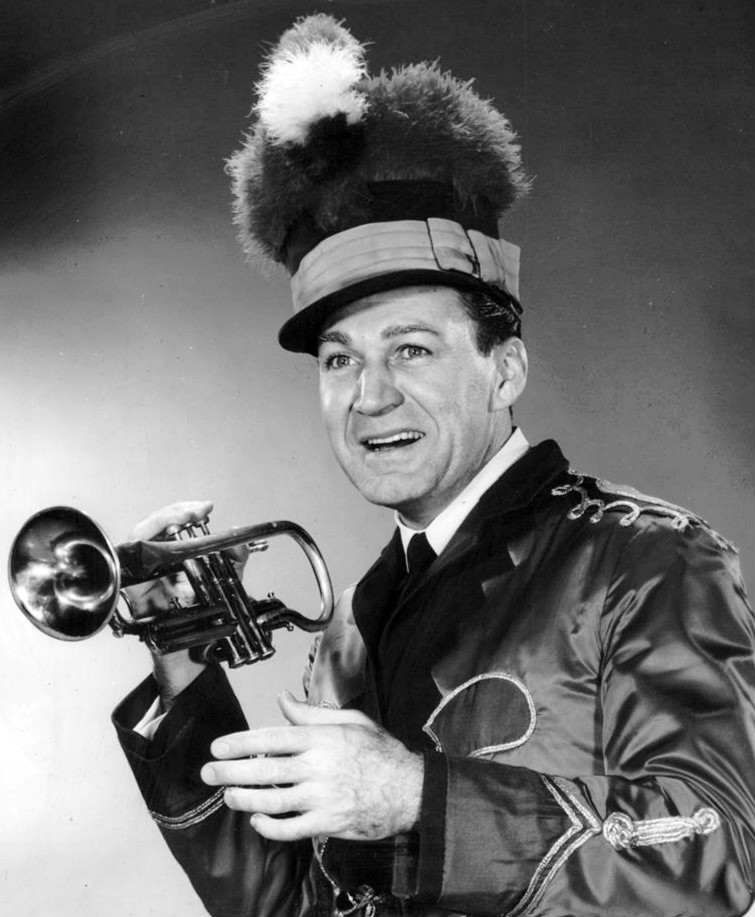
- Tucker on stage in The Music Man (1962)
- Born: Forrest Meredith Tucker; February 12, 1919; Plainfield, Indiana, U.S.
- Died: October 25, 1986 (aged 67); Woodland Hills, Los Angeles, California, U.S.
- Resting place: Forest Lawn Memorial Park, Hollywood Hills, California
- Occupation: Actor
- Years active: 1933–1986
- Spouses: Sandra Jolley (m. 1940; div. 1950) Marilyn Johnson (m. 1951; died 1960) Marilyn Fisk (m. 1961; div. 1985) Sheila Forbes (m. 1986)
- Children: 3

Forrest Meredith Tucker (February 12, 1919 – October 25, 1986) was an American actor in movies and television who appeared in nearly a hundred films. Tucker worked in vaudeville as a straight man at the age of 15. While he was on a trip to California, party hostess Cobina Wright persuaded guest Wesley Ruggles to give Tucker a screen test because of Tucker's photogenic good looks, thick, wavy hair, and height of six feet, five inches.

Tucker was a sight reader who needed only one take. He enlisted in the Army during World War II. After 20 years spent mainly in Westerns and action roles, he returned to his roots, showing versatility as a comedic and stage musical actor. In the television series F Troop, he became identified with the character of Cavalry Sgt. Morgan O'Rourke. Tucker had a drinking problem that began to affect his performances in the later years of his career.

== Early life and education ==
Tucker was born in Plainfield, Indiana, on February 12, 1919, the son of Forrest A. Tucker and his wife, Doris Heringlake. His mother has been described as an alcoholic. A self-avowed "farm boy", Tucker began his performing career at age 14 at the 1933 Chicago World's Fair, pushing the big wicker tourist chairs by day and singing "Throw Money" at night.

After his family moved to Washington, DC, Tucker attracted the attention of Jimmy Lake, the owner of the Old Gaiety Burlesque Theater, by winning its Saturday night amateur contest on consecutive weeks. After his second win, Tucker was hired there at full time as master of ceremonies, but left when it was soon discovered that he was underage.

Tucker graduated from Washington-Lee High School, Arlington, Virginia, near Washington, DC, in 1938, and, after joining the United States Cavalry, was stationed at Fort Myer in Arlington County, Virginia. However, once again, he was discharged for being underage. He returned to work at the Old Gaiety after his 18th birthday.

== Career ==
=== Hollywood ===
When Lake's theater closed for the summer in 1939, a wealthy mentor helped Tucker travel to California to try to break into film acting. He made a successful screen test and began auditioning for movie roles. In his own estimation, Tucker was in the mold of large "ugly guys" such as Wallace Beery, Ward Bond, and Victor McLaglen, rather than a matinee idol. His debut was as a powerfully built farmer who clashes with the hero in The Westerner (1940), which starred Gary Cooper. Tucker stood out in a fight scene with Cooper. Tucker had a support role in The Great Awakening (1941) for United Artists. Overcoming a feeling in Hollywood that fair hair did not photograph well, he quickly attained leading-man status, starring in PRC's Emergency Landing (1941). He signed a contract with Columbia Pictures.

=== Columbia Pictures ===
At Columbia, Tucker had a support role in one of their Lone Wolf pictures, Counter-Espionage (1942), followed by a Boston Blackie entry, Boston Blackie Goes Hollywood (1942). He was borrowed by Metro-Goldwyn-Mayer for Keeper of the Flame with Spencer Tracy and Katharine Hepburn.

=== World War II ===
Like many other movie actors at the time, Tucker enlisted in the United States Army during World War II; he earned a commission as a second lieutenant. He served in the Signal Corps and was discharged in 1945.

=== Post War ===
Tucker resumed his acting career at war's end. Metro-Goldwyn-Mayer borrowed him for the classic film The Yearling (1946). Warner Bros. borrowed him to play Errol Flynn's love rival with Eleanor Parker in Never Say Goodbye the same year.

Back at Columbia Pictures, he was in Coroner Creek (1948) with Randolph Scott.

=== Republic Pictures ===
In 1948, Tucker left Columbia and signed with Republic Pictures. His first films for them were Hellfire (1949) and The Last Bandit (1949) with Wild Bill Elliott. He made Montana Belle for Republic with Jane Russell; it was sold to RKO.

Tucker had a role in Republic's Sands of Iwo Jima (1949), as PFC Thomas, a Marine with a score to settle with John Wayne's Sergeant Stryker. He went back to Columbia to support Scott again in The Nevadan (1950).

Tucker was promoted to star roles with California Passage (1950). He followed this with Rock Island Trail (1950).

Tucker was back to supporting actor for Hoodlum Empire (1952) then over at Paramount he co-starred with Sterling Hayden in Flaming Feather (1952) and supported Charlton Heston in Pony Express (1953).

Tucker went to England in support of British film star Margaret Lockwood in Laughing Anne (1953), a co-production with Republic.

Back in the United States, he returned to Republic: San Antone (1953) with Rod Cameron; Flight Nurse (1953) and Jubilee Trail (1954) with Joan Leslie.

=== England and Crunch and Des ===
He returned to England to make another with Lockwood, Trouble in the Glen (1954), and stayed on to make Break in the Circle (1955) for Hammer Films.

Tucker made some films for Allied Artists, Paris Follies of 1956 (1955) and Finger Man (1955) in support of Frank Lovejoy, and then supported Randolph Scott once more in Rage at Dawn (1956).

Tucker had a two-year stint on television playing the well-received role of a charter-boat captain in Bermuda in the series Crunch and Des from 1955 to 1956 with Sandy Kenyon.

He was top-billed in Fox's The Quiet Gun (1957) and supported Charlton Heston in Three Violent People (1957). Hammer Films in Britain asked him back to play the lead in The Abominable Snowman (1957). He stayed on in England for The Strange World of Planet X (1957) and The Trollenberg Terror (1958).

=== Auntie Mame ===
The year 1958 brought another turning point in his career, when he won the role of Beauregard Burnside, Mame's first husband in Auntie Mame, the highest-grossing U.S. film of the year. Tucker showed a flair for light comedy under the direction of Morton DaCosta that had largely been unexplored in his roles in Westerns and science-fiction films.

He supported Joel McCrea in Fort Massacre (1958) and had the lead in Counterplot (1959).

=== Stage ===
Tucker was cast as Professor Harold Hill in the national touring production of The Music Man in 1958 and played the role 2,008 times over the next five years, including a 56-week run at the Shubert Theatre in Chicago.

Following his Music Man run, Tucker starred in the Broadway production of Fair Game for Lovers (1964).

=== Television and F Troop ===
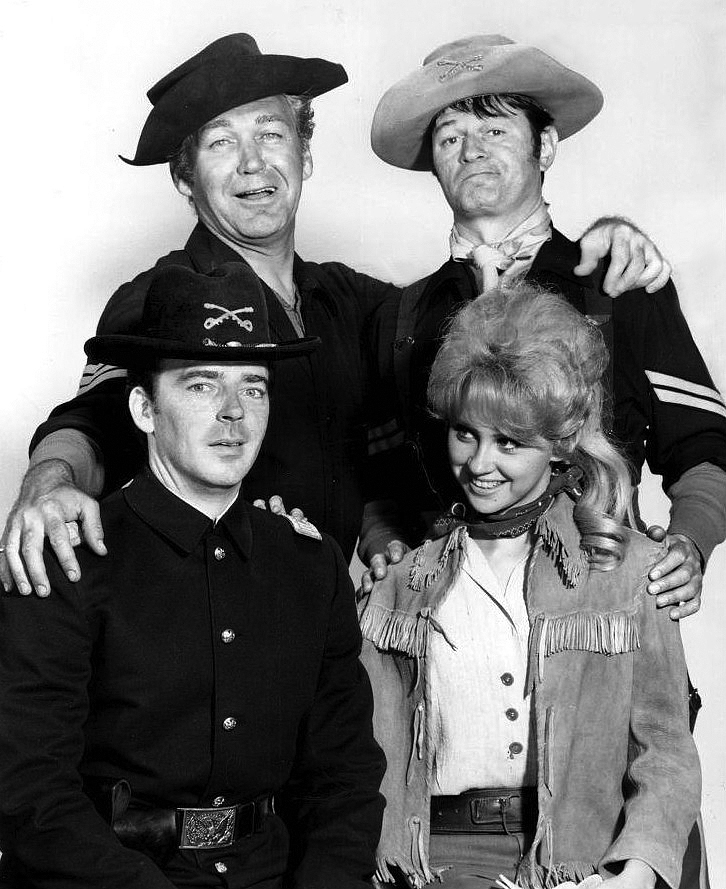
F Troop cast--clockwise from top, Tucker, Larry Storch, Melody Patterson and Ken Berry. (1965)

Tucker turned to television for his most famous role, starring as frontier entrepreneur Sgt. Morgan O'Rourke in F Troop (1965–1967). Though F Troop lasted only two seasons on ABC, the series has been in constant syndication since, reaching three generations of viewers. (Two of his Gunsmoke episodes feature Tucker in his cavalry uniform again, as the unconventional Sergeant Holly (1970), who in one scene "marries" and spends a hectic night with Miss Kitty.)

=== Later career ===
After the run of F Troop ended, Tucker returned to films in character roles such as The Night They Raided Minsky's (1969), Barquero (1970), Chisum (1970), Welcome Home, Johnny Bristol (1972), and Cancel My Reservation (1972). He had the lead in The Wild McCullochs (1975) and was a supporting actor in the television movie A Real American Hero (1978).

On television, Tucker was a frequent guest star, including a total of six appearances on Gunsmoke and the recurring role of Jarvis Castleberry, Flo's estranged father on the 1976–1985 TV series, Alice and its spinoff, Flo. He also appeared as a guest star on The Bionic Woman as J.T. Conners.

Tucker was a regular on three series after F Troop: Dusty's Trail (1973) with Bob Denver; The Ghost Busters (1975) which reunited him with F Troop co-star Larry Storch; and Filthy Rich playing Big Guy Beck (1982–83). He continued to be active on stage, as well, starring in the national productions of Plaza Suite, Show Boat, and That Championship Season.

Tucker returned to the big screen, after an absence of several years, in the Cannon Films action film Thunder Run (1986), playing the hero, trucker Charlie Morrison. His final film appearance was Outtakes, a low-budget imitation of The Groove Tube.

== Personal life ==
Tucker married four times:

1. Sandra Jolley (1919–1986) in 1940: She was the daughter of the character actor I. Stanford Jolley (who died of emphysema) and the sister of the Academy Award-winning art director Stan Jolley. They had a daughter, Pamela "Brooke" Tucker. They divorced in 1950.
2. Marilyn Johnson on March 28, 1950: She died of a heart ailment on July 19, 1960, at the age of 37.
3. Marilyn Fisk on October 23, 1961: They had a daughter, Cindy Tucker, and a son, Forrest Sean Tucker. Fisk appeared in three episodes of F Troop while married to Tucker.
4. Sheila Forbes on April 15, 1986.

Tucker was a Republican.

== Death ==
Tucker, who had battled lung cancer for more than a year, as well as having a series of minor illnesses, collapsed and was hospitalized, for the second time in a week, on his way to the ceremony for his star on the Hollywood Walk of Fame on August 21, 1986. He died at the Motion Picture & Television Country House and Hospital on October 25, 1986, a few months after the theatrical release of Thunder Run and Outtakes. He was interred in Forest Lawn–Hollywood Hills Cemetery in the Hollywood Hills.

== Selected filmography ==
- The Westerner (1940) .... Wade Harper
- Emergency Landing (1941) .... Jerry Barton
- The Great Awakening (1941) .... Moritz
- Honolulu Lu (1941) .... Barney
- Shut My Big Mouth (1942) .... Red
- Canal Zone (1942) .... Recruit Madigan
- Tramp, Tramp, Tramp (1942) .... Blond Bomber
- Submarine Raider (1942) .... Pulaski
- Parachute Nurse (1942) .... Lt. Tucker
- Counter-Espionage (1942) .... Anton Schugg
- My Sister Eileen (1942) .... Sandhog (uncredited)
- The Spirit of Stanford (1942) .... Buzz Costello (uncredited)
- Boston Blackie Goes Hollywood (1942) .... Whipper
- Keeper of the Flame (1942) .... Geoffrey Midford
- Talk About a Lady (1946) .... Bart Manners
- The Man Who Dared (1946) .... Larry James
- Renegades (1946) .... Frank Dembrow
- Dangerous Business (1946) .... Clayton Russell
- Never Say Goodbye (1946) .... Fenwick Lonkowski
- The Yearling (1946) .... Lem Forrester
- Gunfighters (1947) .... Ben Orcutt
- Adventures in Silverado (1948) .... Zeke Butler
- Coroner Creek (1948) .... Ernie Combs
- Two Guys from Texas (1948) .... 'Tex' Bennett
- The Plunderers (1948) .... Whit Lacey
- The Last Bandit (1949) .... Jim Plummer
- The Big Cat (1949) .... Gil Hawks
- Hellfire (1949) .... Marshal Bucky McLean
- Brimstone (1949) .... Sheriff Henry McIntyre
- Sands of Iwo Jima (1949) .... Pfc. Al Thomas
- The Nevadan (1950) .... Tom Tanner
- Rock Island Trail (1950) .... Reed Loomis
- California Passage (1950) .... Mike Prescott
- Oh! Susanna (1951) .... Lieutenant Colonel Unger
- Fighting Coast Guard (1951) .... Bill Rourk
- Warpath (1951) .... Sgt. O'Hara
- Crosswinds (1951) .... Gerald 'Jumbo' Johnson
- The Wild Blue Yonder (1951) .... Maj. Tom West
- Flaming Feather (1952) .... Lt. Tom Blaine
- Bugles in the Afternoon (1952) .... Donavan
- Hoodlum Empire (1952) .... Charley Pignatalli
- Hurricane Smith (1952) .... Dan McGuire
- Montana Belle (1952) .... Mac
- Ride the Man Down (1952) .... Sam Danfelser
- San Antone (1953) .... Lt. Brian Culver, CSA
- Pony Express (1953) .... Wild Bill Hickok
- Laughing Anne (1953) .... Jem Farrell
- Flight Nurse (1953) .... Capt. Bill Eaton
- Jubilee Trail (1954) .... John Ives
- Trouble in the Glen (1954) .... Maj. Jim 'Lance' Lansing
- Break in the Circle (1955) .... Capt. Skip Morgan
- Rage at Dawn (1955) .... Frank Reno
- Finger Man (1955) .... Dutch Becker
- Night Freight (1955) .... Mike Peters
- The Vanishing American (1955) .... Morgan
- Paris Follies of 1956 (1955) .... Dan Bradley
- Stagecoach to Fury (1956) .... Frank Townsend
- Three Violent People (1956) .... Deputy Commissioner Cable
- The Quiet Gun (1957) .... Sheriff Carl Brandon
- The Abominable Snowman (1957) .... Tom Friend
- The Deerslayer (1957) .... Harry March
- The Strange World of Planet X (1958) .... Gil Graham
- Fort Massacre (1958) .... McGurney
- Girl in the Woods (1958) .... Steve Cory
- The Trollenberg Terror (1958, also known as The Crawling Eye) .... Alan Brooks
- Auntie Mame (1958) .... Beauregard Jackson Pickett Burnside
- Gunsmoke in Tucson (1958) .... John Brazos
- Counterplot (1959) .... Brock Miller
- Don't Worry, We'll Think of a Title (1966) .... Romantic Diner Customer (uncredited)
- The Night They Raided Minsky's (1968) .... Trim Houlihan
- Barquero (1970) .... Mountain Phil
- Chisum (1970) .... Lawrence Murphy
- Welcome Home, Johnny Bristol (1972, TV Movie) .... Harry McMartin
- Cancel My Reservation (1972) .... Reese
- The Wild McCullochs (1975) .... J.J. McCulloch
- Walking Tall: Final Chapter (1977) .... Grandpa Pusser
- Rare Breed (1984) .... Jess Cutler
- Katy Caterpillar (1984) .... Goliath the Cat (English version, voice)
- Thunder Run (1986) .... Charlie Morrison
- Outtakes (1987) .... Himself
- Timestalkers (1987, TV Movie) .... Texas John Cody (final film role)

== Television ==
- G.E. Summer Originals episode "Blizzard Bound" (August 28, 1956)
- Wagon Train episode "The Rex Montana Story" (May 28, 1958) .... Rex Montana
- Death Valley Days episode "Three Minutes to Eternity" (1963) .... Bob Dalton of the Dalton Gang.
- The Virginian episode "Hideout" (1965) .... Martin Evers
- Gunsmoke episode "Double Entry" (1965) .... Brad McClain
- Gunsmoke episode "The Storm" (1965) .... Adam Benteen
- F Troop (1965–1967) .... Sgt. Morgan O'Rourke / Sgt. O'Rourke / Sgt. Morgan Sylvester O'Rourke
- Daniel Boone episode "The Ballad of Sidewinder and Cherokee" (1967) .... Joe Snag
- Rawhide episode “Incident of the Death Dancer” (December 5, 1967)
- Gunsmoke episode "Cattle Barons" (1967) .... John Charron
- Gunsmoke episode "The War Priest" (1970) .... Sergeant Emmett Holly
- Gunsmoke episode "Sergeant Holly" (1970) .... Sergeant Emmett Holly
- Alias Smith and Jones episode "Alias Smith and Jones" (1971) .... Deputy Harker Wilkins
- Night Gallery (1971) .... Dr. Ernest Stringfellow (segment "Dr. Stringfellow's Rejuvenator")
- Columbo episode "Blueprint for Murder" (1972) .... Bo Williamson
- Gunsmoke episode "Yankton" (1972) .... Will Donavan
- Dusty's Trail (1973–1974) .... Mr. Callahan
- Little House on the Prairie 1975 episode "Founder's Day" ... Jim Tyler
- The Ghost Busters (1975) .... Jake Kong
- Kojak episode "On The Edge" (1975) .... Det. Paul Zachary
- The Bionic Woman episode "The Deadly Missiles" (1976) .... J.T. Connors
- Once an Eagle miniseries (1976) .... Col. Avery
- The Rebels (1979, TV Movie) .... Angus Fletcher
- Alice (1979) .... Edsel Jarvis Castleberry
- Flo (1980) .... Jarvis Castleberry
- The Love Boat (1980, 1982, 1983) .... 3 episodes (3 roles)
- Filthy Rich (1982–83) ... Big Guy Beck
- Blood Feud miniseries (1983) .... Lyndon B. Johnson
- Murder, She Wrote episode "It's a Dog's Life" (1984) .... Tom Cassidy
