= Kirksey Nix =

American mobster (born 1943)

- Born: Kirksey McCord Nix Jr. 1943 (age 82–83)
- Father: Kirksey M. Nix

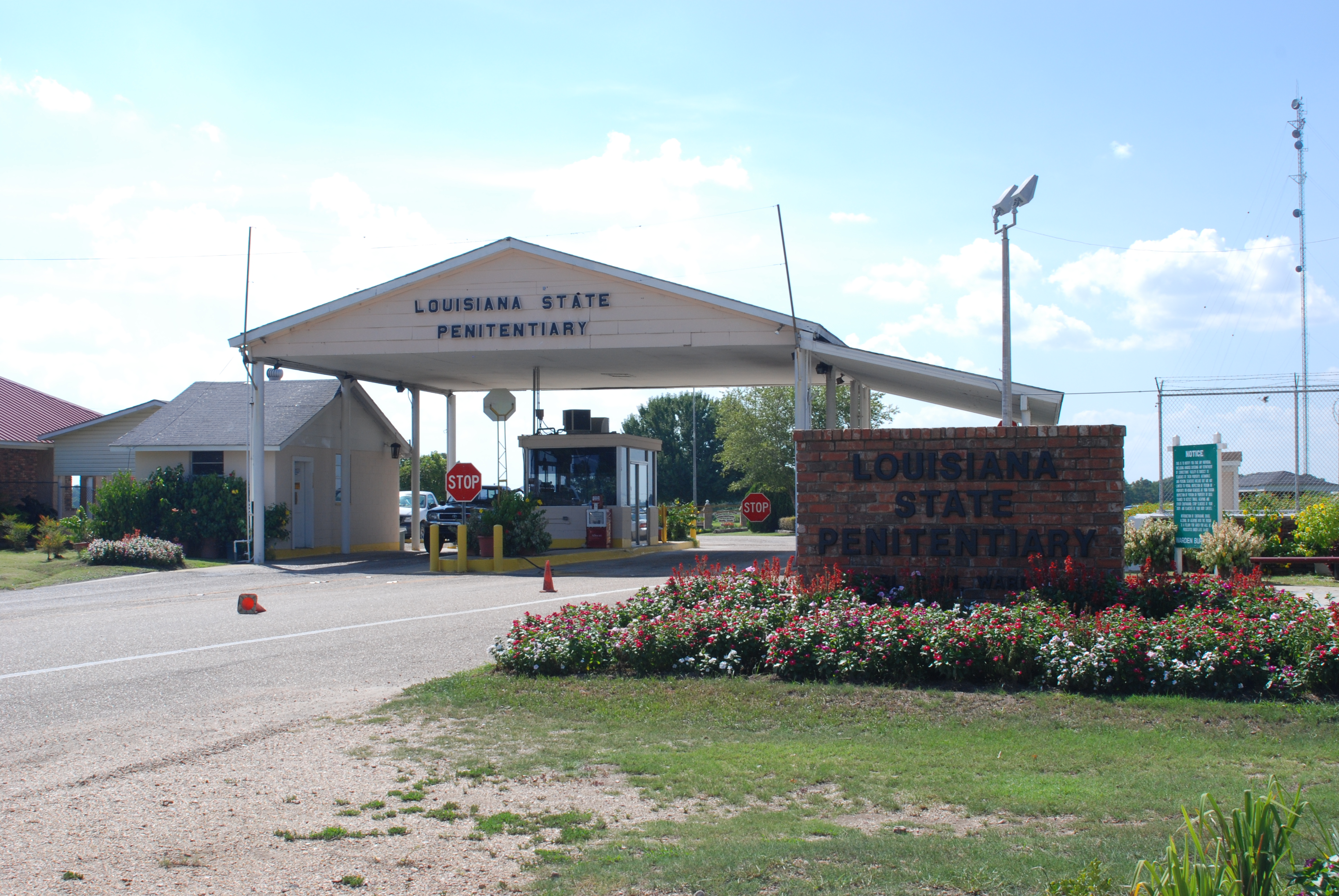
Louisiana State Penitentiary, from where Nix perpetrated a "Lonely Hearts" scam

Kirksey McCord Nix Jr. (born 1943) is the former boss of the Dixie Mafia.

He was named as a suspect in a purported assassination attempt on Sheriff Buford Pusser, and in the death of Pusser's wife on August 12, 1967. Nix has repeatedly refused to comment about Pusser's claims that he was one of his wife's killers. Pusser has since been named as the chief suspect in his wife's death.

In 1972, Nix was convicted of murdering Frank Corso, a New Orleans grocery executive, in a break-in at Corso's home, and began serving a life sentence without parole.

Nix was later convicted for involvement in the 1987 murder-for-hire killing of Judge Vincent Sherry and city councilwoman Margaret Sherry, spouses, in Biloxi, Mississippi. As described by the United States Court of Appeals for the Fifth Circuit:

While serving a life sentence for murder at Angola State Penitentiary, Nix built a criminal empire from which he hoped to earn enough money to buy his way out of prison. Although he dabbled in insurance fraud and drug dealing, Nix's primary money-making scheme was a "lonely hearts" scam designed to defraud homosexual men. Nix and his prison syndicate would place personal advertisements in national homosexual magazines. When men would respond to these ads, Nix or one of his associates would indicate that he was having financial difficulties and needed the respondent to wire money to a Nix associate outside prison. Nix acquired hundreds of thousands of dollars from this scam.

Mike Gillich ("Gillich"), the alleged "underworld boss" of Biloxi, Mississippi, aided Nix in his various schemes. Peter Halat, a Biloxi attorney, maintained a trust account for Nix. . . .

In December 1986, Halat told Nix and Gillich that approximately $100,000 of Nix's money was missing from the office trust account. Halat indicated that he suspected Vincent Sherry, Halat's former law partner and a Mississippi Circuit Judge, of stealing the money. Coincidentally, Judge Sherry's wife Margaret was a Biloxi mayoral candidate critical of Gillich's operations. The prosecution produced evidence that the three men arranged to have the Sherrys killed.

— United States v. Sharpe, United States Court of Appeals for the Fifth Circuit

In 1991, a jury convicted Nix, Gillich, Sheri LaRa Sharpe, and John Ransom of wire fraud and conspiracy to commit wire fraud, and it found Nix and Gillich guilty of travel in aid of murder-for-hire. In 1994, Gillich became a state informant, and, in 1997, a second trial yielded convictions against Nix, Gillich, Halat, and Thomas Leslie Holcomb. Nix was found guilty of racketeering, conspiracy to violate the racketeering statute, fraud, conspiracy to commit wire fraud, money laundering, and conspiracy to obstruct justice. Holcomb was serving a life sentence for carrying out the killings for pay and died in prison in 2005 at age 52. Ransom was released from federal prison in late 2003 at age 76 and returned to the Atlanta area.

Nix is currently incarcerated at the Federal Correctional Institution, El Reno.
