= Talk to Me (Bahjat song) =

Single by Bahjat
- Released: October 10, 2016
- Recorded: 2014–16
- Genre: Pop
- Length: 3:36
- Songwriter(s): Bahjat Etorjman, Nikolaos Giannulidis
- Producer(s): Trevor Kissaun, Peter Borg, Bahjat Etorjman, Nikolaos Giannulidis

Bahjat singles chronology
"Stand Tall" (2015)	"Talk to Me" (2016)	"Do You Remember Me?" (2018)

"Talk to Me" is the title of the second single and first commercially available single by Libyan singer Bahjat. The song is talks about being in love with someone who doesn't even know you exist and simply wishing that they'd talk to you. The song was premiered through Malta's Bay radio station on October 10, 2016, and debuted at #10 off of only a single day of airplay. The song became Bahjat's first #1 single in Malta on 31 October 2016.

== Background ==
"Talk To Me" was written in 2014 when Bahjat saw a girl while studying at the University of Malta and couldn't stop thinking about her. The single was recorded as the commercial follow-up to "Stand Tall." After being put aside for various months (the original demo was done by Bahjat and Phoenician producer Ari Bradshaw), the single was finally released on October 10, 2016. The song was later produced by Trevor Kisaun, Bahjat himself and Peter Borg, who did the guitars on the track. The single was later re-purposed and transformed from a folk-pop song to an uptempo pure pop song with additional writing and production from Nikolaos Giannulidis, known for working with artists such as Chris Brown and Nelly. The cover art was revealed the Friday before release, on October 7 and was promoted via Instagram, Snapchat, and the Malta Bay radio station.

== Chart performance ==
The song debuted at #7 on the Malta Top 10 after only a day of airplay, then rose to #3 in its second week. The song hit #1 on its fourth week of charting, becoming Bahjat's first #1 single in Malta.

Chart (2015)	Position
Bay Radio's Malta Top 10	1
