= Logan Ramsey =

American actor (1921–2000)

- Ramsey as Claudius Marcus in Star Trek: The Original Series episode "Bread and Circuses"
- Born: Logan Carlisle Ramsey Jr. March 21, 1921; Long Beach, California, U.S.
- Died: June 26, 2000 (aged 79); Los Angeles, California, U.S.
- Occupation: Actor
- Years active: 1948–2000
- Spouse: Anne Ramsey (m. 1954; died 1988)

Logan Carlisle Ramsey Jr. (March 21, 1921 – June 26, 2000) was an American character actor of television and film for nearly 50 years.

== Early life ==
Ramsey was born in Long Beach, California, the son of Harriet Lillian (née Kilmartin) and Captain Logan Carlisle Ramsey Sr., USN, a Naval Aviator who raised the alarm during the attack on Pearl Harbor and later became the captain of the aircraft carrier USS Block Island (CVE-21). The junior Ramsey served as a Naval Aviator aboard the sunken Block Island's namesake carrier, USS Block Island (CVE-106). During down time, Ensign Ramsey would participate in "smokers" (entertainment programs between boxing matches) aboard ship. After the war he moved to New York City and studied acting under famous acting coach Lee Strasberg.

== Stage, television, and film ==
Logan's Broadway credits include The Great Indoors (1965), In the Summer House (1953), The High Ground (1950), and The Devil's Disciple (1950).

Primarily a TV character actor, Ramsey was a frequent guest star on series television during the 1960s and '70s. Ramsey appeared on, among many others: The Edge of Night; Star Trek, Mission: Impossible; Here Come the Brides; Hawaii Five-O; M*A*S*H; Maude; Charlie's Angels; Quincy, M.E.; Mork & Mindy; Battlestar Galactica, Knight Rider; Night Court; Highway to Heaven and the miniseries Testimony of Two Men and The Winds of War.

Ramsey's film roles included Banning (1967), the Monkees film Head (1968), Childish Things (1969), The Reivers (1969), The Traveling Executioner (1970), What's the Matter with Helen? (1971), Jump (1971), John Witter in the original Walking Tall film trilogy, Some Call It Loving (1973), Busting (1974), Cornbread, Earl and Me (1975), Treasure of Matecumbe (1976), Mean Dog Blues (1978), Any Which Way You Can (1980, as the husband of his real wife Anne Ramsey), The Beast Within (1982), Joysticks (1983), Scrooged (1988, with his wife Anne Ramsey), and Pass the Ammo (1988).

== Personal life ==
Ramsey was married to actress Anne Ramsey from 1954 until her death from cancer in 1988.

== Death ==
On June 26, 2000, Ramsey died from a heart attack in Los Angeles, California.

== Selected filmography ==
- A Face in the Crowd (1957) - TV Director (uncredited)
- The Hoodlum Priest (1961) - George Hale
- Something Wild (1961) - Bit Part (uncredited)
- Banning (1967) - Doc Brewer
- How to Steal the World (1968) - Ship's Captain
- Head (1968) - Off. Faye Lapid
- Pendulum (1969) - Detective Jelinek
- Childish Things (1969) - Mr. Simmons
- The Reivers (1969) - Walter Clapp
- The Traveling Executioner (1970) - La Follette
- Jump (1971) - Babe Duggers
- The Sporting Club (1971) - Scott
- What's the Matter with Helen? (1971) - Detective Sgt. West
- Glass Houses (1972)
- Outside In (1972) - Uncle Albert
- Walking Tall (1973) - John Witter
- Some Call It Loving (1973) - Carnival Doctor
- Busting (1974) - Dr. Berman
- Cornbread, Earl and Me (1975) - Deputy Coroner
- Farewell, My Lovely (1975) - Commissioner
- Walking Tall Part 2 (1975) - John Witter
- Treasure of Matecumbe (1976) - Coley
- Walking Tall: Final Chapter (1977) - John Witter
- Mean Dog Blues (1978) - Edmund Oberlin
- Any Which Way You Can (1980) - Luther Quince
- The Beast Within (1982) - Edwin Curwin
- Joysticks (1983) - Mayor Neville
- Say Yes (1986) - George
- Pass the Ammo (1988) - Jim Bob Collins
- Dr. Hackenstein (1988) - Xavier Rhodes
- Scrooged (1988) - Man in Shelter
- Meet the Hollowheads (1989) - Top Drone
- Fat Man and Little Boy (1989) - Brehon Somervell
