= Buford Pusser =

American sheriff (1937–1974)

Sheriff of McNairy County, Tennessee
- In office 1964–1970
- Preceded by: James Dickey

Constable of Adamsville, Tennessee
- In office 1970–1972
- In office 1962–1964

Personal details
- Born: Buford Hayse Pusser; December 12, 1937 Adamsville, Tennessee, U.S.
- Died: August 21, 1974 (aged 36) Adamsville, Tennessee, U.S.
- Spouse: Pauline Mullins (m. 1959; died 1967)
- Children: Dwana Pusser
- Nickname: "Buford the Bull"

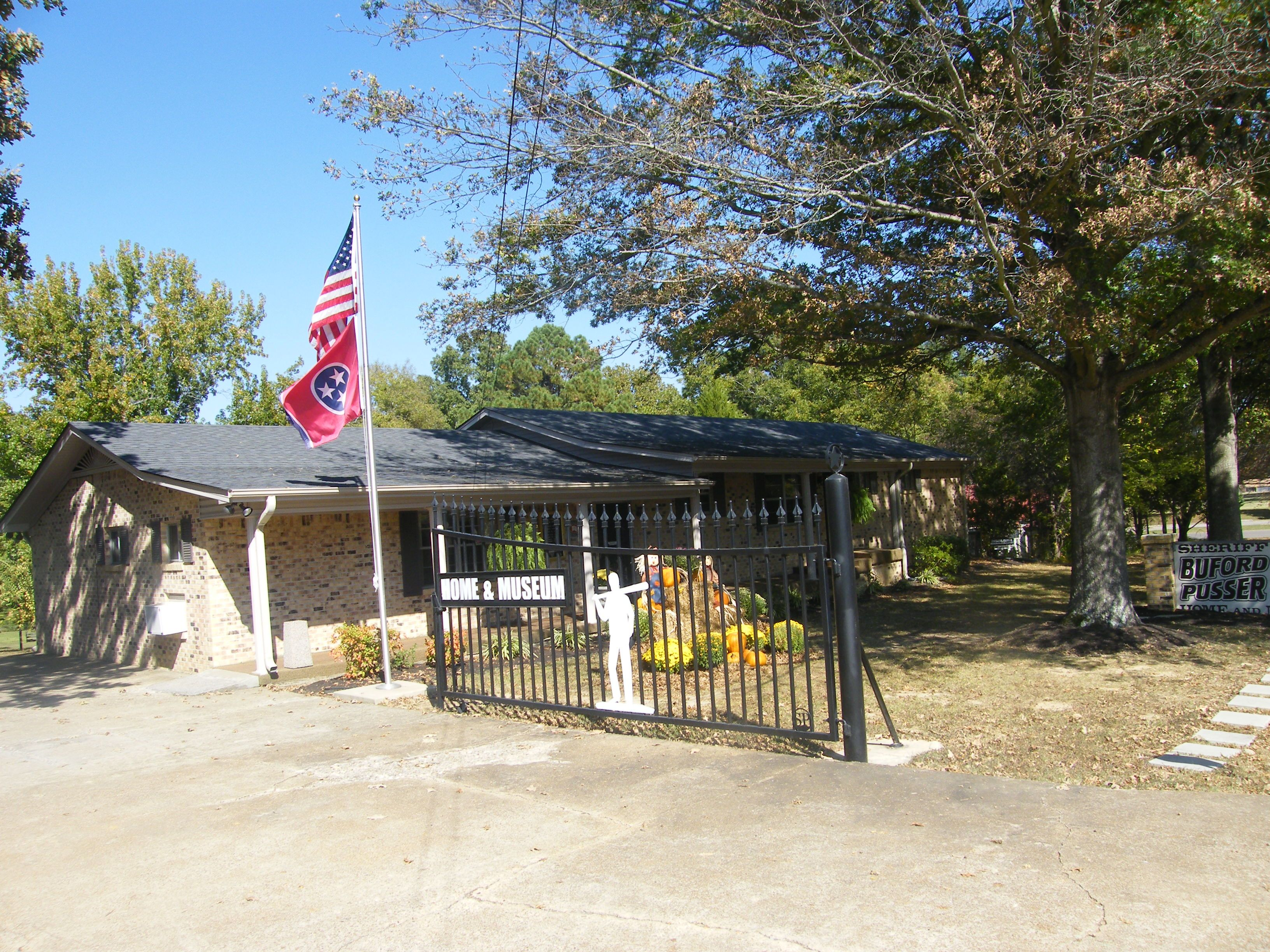
Buford Pusser Home and Museum in Adamsville

Buford Hayse Pusser (December 12, 1937 – August 21, 1974) was an American police officer and politician who served as the sheriff of McNairy County, Tennessee from 1964 to 1970 and constable of Adamsville from 1970 to 1972. His time in office inspired several books, songs, and movies, most notably Walking Tall. He was also a wrestler known as "Buford the Bull" in the Mid-South.

Pusser's wife Pauline died of gunshot wounds in 1967, which he said was committed in revenge by opponents of his law enforcement career. No one was ever charged for killing her. In August 2025, the Tennessee Bureau of Investigation announced new evidence implicating Pusser in her death.

== Life and career ==
Buford Pusser was born in Adamsville, McNairy County, Tennessee, on December 12, 1937. He was the son of Helen (née Harris) and Carl Pusser. His father was the police chief of Adamsville, Tennessee. Buford Pusser was a high-school football and basketball player and was 6 feet 6 inches (1.98 m) tall. He enlisted in the United States Marine Corps when he graduated from high school, but his service ended in boot camp when he was given a medical discharge for asthma.

In 1957, he moved to Chicago, where he was a local wrestler known as "Buford the Bull". He married Pauline Mullins on December 5, 1959. Pusser returned home in 1962 and in September he was elected Adamsville's police chief and constable. In 1964, Pusser ran against incumbent Democratic sheriff James Dickey as the Republican Party's nominee. After Dickey was killed in an auto accident, Pusser was elected sheriff. He was the youngest sheriff in Tennessee's history. Pusser promptly began trying to eliminate the Dixie Mafia and the State Line Mob.

Pusser survived several alleged assassination attempts. According to events as told by Pusser, on February 1, 1966, Louise Hathcock attempted to kill Pusser during an on-site investigation of a robbery complaint at the Shamrock Motel. Hathcock allegedly fired on Pusser with a concealed .38 pistol. Pusser returned fire and killed Hathcock. On January 2, 1967, Pusser was shot three times by an unidentified gunman.

=== Murder of Pauline Pusser ===
According to Pusser, his phone rang before dawn on the morning of August 12, 1967, informing him of a disturbance on New Hope Road in McNairy County; Pusser responded, and his wife, Pauline, rode along. Pusser said that shortly after they passed the New Hope Methodist Church, a fast-moving car came alongside theirs and the occupants opened fire, killing his wife and leaving Pusser for dead. Doctors said he was struck on the left side of his jaw by at least two, or possibly three, rounds from a .30-caliber carbine. He spent 18 days in the hospital before returning home, and he required several more surgeries to restore his appearance.

Despite vowing to bring his wife's murderers to justice, Pusser was unable to bring Kirksey Nix or any of the accused to trial. Nix was sentenced to the Louisiana State Penitentiary in Angola for the 1971 Easter Saturday murder of New Orleans grocer Frank J. Corso. While imprisoned, Nix and his co-conspirator Pete Halat, who later served as mayor of Biloxi, Mississippi, ordered the 1987 murder-for-hire of Judge Vincent Sherry and his wife, Margaret, in Biloxi. In his capacity as Nix's attorney, Halat had stolen hundreds of thousands of dollars that Nix had amassed in a massive lonely hearts scam, blaming it on Sherry, his former law partner. Nix was later sentenced to isolation for the rest of his life. According to a 1990 AP story in The Town Talk, a newspaper in Alexandria, Louisiana, Nix denied being involved in the ambush of the Pussers.

On January 5, 2024, more than 56 years after Pauline Pusser's death, the Tennessee Bureau of Investigation (TBI) announced that the criminal investigation remained an active case, and requested information from the public. Following several tips, the TBI confirmed that an autopsy had never been performed on Pauline Pusser's remains during the course of the original investigation in 1967. In a written statement, the TBI said, "With the support of Pauline's family and in consultation with 25th Judicial District Attorney General Mark Davidson, TBI requested the exhumation [of Pauline Pusser's remains] in an attempt to answer critical questions and provide crucial information that may assist in identifying the person or persons responsible for Pauline Pusser's death." Her remains were exhumed on February 8, 2024 and reinterred on or around April 7, 2024.

The TBI and the district attorney general for Tennessee's 25th Judicial District announced on August 29, 2025, that, were Buford Pusser alive, there would be probable cause to charge him with the death of his wife. Investigators announced that Pauline Pusser's wounds were not consistent with Pusser's story, but rather were consistent with having been shot at close range, that Pauline's nose had been broken shortly before her death, and that the blood on Buford Pusser's car also contradicted his narrative. They also found that Pusser's own wound was likely self-inflicted.

=== Later career ===
Pusser shot and killed an intoxicated Charles Russell Hamilton on December 25, 1968, after responding to a complaint that Hamilton had threatened his landlord with a gun.

Pusser was ineligible for re-election in 1970 due to term limits then in effect. He was defeated in his bid for sheriff in 1972. Pusser blamed his loss to incumbent Sheriff Clifford Coleman in part on the controversy surrounding the making of the semibiographical movie Walking Tall. Pusser was nonetheless re-elected as constable of Adamsville by a majority of voters. He served as constable for two more years (1970–1972).

=== Death ===
Buford Pusser died on August 21, 1974, of injuries sustained in a one-car automobile accident 4 miles (6.4 km) west of Adamsville. Earlier that day, he had contracted with Bing Crosby Productions in Memphis to portray himself in the sequel to Walking Tall. Returning home alone that evening from the McNairy County Fair in his specially modified Corvette, Pusser struck an embankment at high speed and was ejected from the vehicle. The car caught fire and burned.

Local speculation regarding the cause of the accident included rumors of sabotage to the steering mechanism and the tie rods. The Tennessee state trooper who responded to the accident, Paul Ervin, later became the sheriff of McNairy County. Ervin claimed that Pusser's death was caused by drunk driving without a seat belt. Buford's daughter, Dwana Pusser, a passenger in another car, came upon the scene of the accident minutes later. No autopsy of Pusser's body was performed. As sheriff, Pusser was credited with surviving seven stabbings and eight shootings. Pusser's memorial service was held at the Adamsville Church of Christ.

== Popular culture ==
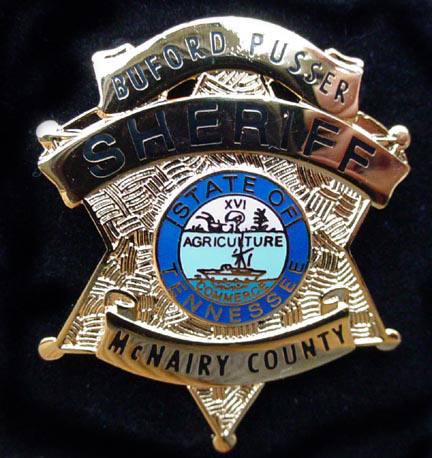
Pusser's official sheriff badge

Pusser was the subject of three biographical books written by W.R. Morris: The Twelfth of August: The Story of Buford Pusser (1971), Buford: True Story of "Walking Tall" Sheriff Buford Pusser (1984), and The State Line Mob: A True Story of Murder and Intrigue (1990). In addition, Morris also created a pictorial history book of Buford called The Legacy of Buford Pusser: A Pictorial History of the "Walking Tall" Sheriff (1997). Pusser's daughter Dwana released a book in 2009 entitled Walking On, which is also an account of his life.

The 1973 movie Walking Tall was based on Pusser's story. It was followed by two sequels in 1975 and 1977, a TV movie in 1978, and a brief TV series in 1981.

A remake by the same title was released in 2004 starring Dwayne Johnson as the main character, renamed Chris Vaughn. After the success of the 2004 film, Walking Tall: The Payback was released in 2007 direct-to-video. The name of the main character, who was portrayed by Kevin Sorbo, was changed to Nick Prescott, and the movie was set in the Dallas area. Later that year, on September 25, 2007, Sorbo returned in Walking Tall: Lone Justice.

The Buford Pusser Museum was established at the home he lived in at the time of his death in 1974. A Buford Pusser Festival is held each May in his hometown of Adamsville, Tennessee.

=== In music ===
Singer Eddie Bond wrote and recorded several songs honoring Pusser, beginning with "Buford Pusser" in 1968. Many of them were collected on a 1973 LP album, Eddie Bond Sings the Legend of Buford Pusser. Pusser himself was also a recording artist, with "It Happened In Tennessee", released in October 1973 on Stax Records subsidiary Respect. Southern rock band Drive-By Truckers told the story of Pusser's battle with organized crime in the songs "The Boys from Alabama", "Cottonseed", and "The Buford Stick" from their 2004 album The Dirty South. In the songs "The Buford Stick" and "The Boys From Alabama", they speculated on how criminals might have viewed Pusser.

Jimmy Buffett refers to an altercation between Pusser and himself in the songs "Presents To Send You" and "Semi-True Story" (from the albums A1A and Beach House on the Moon, respectively). According to Buffett, Pusser and he were staying in the same Nashville motel when Buffett decided to go out for some food and bring it back to the motel. Buffett, who had been drinking, could not find his rental car and decided to climb up on a Cadillac for a better view. That Cadillac turned out to belong to Pusser, who was not at all pleased to find this stranger atop his car. There is also a line in the Buffett song "Close Calls" on the album Equal Strain on All Parts that references the altercation with Buford Pusser.
