= Kirksey M. Nix =

American politician (died 1979)

Oklahoma Court of Criminal Appeals Judge
- In office 1956 – November 1, 1971
- Preceded by: Dick Jones
- Succeeded by: Robert D. Simms

Member of the Oklahoma Senate from the 25th district
- In office 1951–1956
- Preceded by: M. O. Counts
- Succeeded by: Gene Stipe

Member of the Oklahoma House of Representatives
- In office 1949–1951
- Preceded by: Garland Jordan
- Succeeded by: C. Plowboy Edwards
- In office 1939–1945
- Preceded by: Milam M. King
- Succeeded by: Milam M. King
- Constituency: McIntosh County (1939-1945); Pittsburg County (1949-1951)

Personal details
- Born: Texanna, Oklahoma, United States
- Died: February 23, 1979 Houston, Texas, United States
- Party: Democratic
- Children: 3, including Kirksey Nix Jr.
- Education: Southeastern Oklahoma State University; University of Oklahoma Law School

Kirksey M. Nix was an American judge and politician who served in the Oklahoma House of Representatives, Oklahoma Senate, and on the Oklahoma Court of Criminal Appeals. He was the father of Kirksey Nix.

== Biography ==
Kirksey M. Nix was born in Texanna, Oklahoma, and was a polio survivor. He graduated from Eufaula High School, Southeastern Oklahoma State University, and the University of Oklahoma Law School. After law school he worked as a trial lawyer.

He served as a Democratic member of the Oklahoma House of Representatives representing McIntosh County from 1939 to 1945. He was preceded and succeeded in office by Milam M. King. He also represented Pittsburg County from 1949 to 1951. He was preceded in office by Garland Jordan and succeeded by C. Plowboy Edwards.

In 1951, he was elected to succeed M. O. Counts in the Oklahoma Senate representing the 25th district. He served until 1957 when he was succeeded by Gene Stipe.

In 1956, he ran against incumbent Oklahoma Court of Criminal Appeals Judge Dick Jones and was elected to the court. He was reelected in 1956 and 1962, and retained in 1968. He retired on November 1, 1971, and was succeeded by Robert D. Simms.

He died on February 23, 1979, in Houston, Texas, due to cardiac failure. He was the father of Kirksey Nix Jr.
