= List of mayors of Biloxi, Mississippi =

This article contains a list of mayors of Biloxi, Mississippi, United States.

== History ==
After receiving its charter in 1838, Biloxi was classified as a township and elected a president and a board of selectmen. On the eve of the American Civil War, these titles were changed to mayor and aldermen and were part-time positions. In 1919, Biloxi voters opted to have a new full-time government with a mayor and two commissioners elected to four-year terms. This system remained in place until voters again amended the city's governing structure in 1978, approving a mayor-council form of government with a city-wide elected mayor and councilmen elected from seven wards in the city, which went into effect at the 1981 elections.

== List of mayors (1919–present) ==
Mayor	In office	Political party
John J. Kennedy	1919–1933	Democratic
Hart Chinn	1933–1935	Democratic
John A. O'Keefe	1935–1936	Democratic
Louis Braun	1936–1943	Democratic
Chester Delacruz	1943–1947	Democratic
G.B. Cousins	1947–1951	Democratic
Hart Chinn	1951–1953	Democratic
Laz Quave	1953–1961	Democratic
Daniel D. Guice	1961–1973	Democratic
Jeremiah J. O'Keefe	1973–1981	Democratic
Gerald Blessey	1981–1989	Democratic
Pete Halat	1989–1993	Democratic
A. J. Holloway	1993–2015	Republican
Andrew "FoFo" Gilich	2015–	Republican

== Sources ==
- "History of Biloxi governance," from Inauguration Program, and captions from Gallery of Mayors photo exhibit on second floor of City Hall.
