= Walk Tall =

Walk Tall may refer to:

- Walk Tall (film), 1960 Western
- Walk Tall (album), 1998 album by Eric Marienthal
- "Walk Tall" (country song), 1964
- "Walk Tall" (John Mellencamp song), 2004
- "Walk Tall" (The Cannonball Adderley Quintet song), from Country Preacher, 1969
- "Walk Tall", 1991 song by Orchestral Manoeuvres in the Dark from the album Sugar Tax

== See also ==
- Walking Tall (disambiguation)
