= Filthy Rich =

Filthy Rich may refer to:

- Filthy Rich (1982 TV series), a television series starring Dixie Carter and Delta Burke
- Filthy Rich: Cattle Drive, a 2005 reality television series
- Filthy Rich (2016 TV series), a New Zealand television series
- Filthy Rich (2020 TV series), an American serialized satirical drama television series
- Jeffrey Epstein: Filthy Rich, a 2020 documentary TV series
  - Filthy Rich, a 2017 book by James Patterson, the basis of the documentary
- Ghislaine Maxwell: Filthy Rich, 2022 documentary about Jeffrey Epstein accomplice
- Filthy Rich (game), a board game manufactured by Wizards of the Coast
- Filthy Rich (comics), a 2009 original graphic novel written by Brian Azzarello
- Filthy Rich, a rapper who released the 1996 album, All Frames of the Game
- Filthy Rich, a minor character from My Little Pony: Friendship Is Magic
- Filthy Rich: A Fieldguide to a Dangerous Species, a book by Peter Robbins
- Filthy Rich, a 2024 single by Ella Henderson

== See also ==
- Filthy Rich & Catflap, a 1980s television sitcom
- Filthy Riches, a 2017 American television series that aired on the National Geographic Channel
