= Walking Tall Part 2 =

1975 film by Earl Bellamy

- Theatrical release poster
- Directed by: Earl Bellamy
- Written by: Howard B. Kreitsek
- Produced by: Charles A. Pratt
- Starring: Bo Svenson; Richard Jaeckel; Bruce Glover; Robert DoQui; Noah Beery
- Cinematography: Keith C. Smith
- Edited by: Art Seid
- Music by: Walter Scharf
- Production companies: Bing Crosby Productions; Cinerama Releasing Corporation; Fuqua Industries; Wometco Enterprises
- Distributed by: American International Pictures
- Release date: July 2, 1975
- Running time: 109 minutes
- Country: United States
- Language: English
- Box office: $11,000,000 or $9.4 million

Walking Tall Part 2 is the 1975 sequel to the crime/action film, Walking Tall. Directed by Earl Bellamy and produced by Charles A. Pratt, the film stars Bo Svenson as Buford Pusser, replacing Joe Don Baker who played Pusser in the first Walking Tall film. The on-screen title of the film is Part 2 Walking Tall: The Legend of Buford Pusser. The film was followed in 1977 by Walking Tall: Final Chapter, also starring Svenson.

== Plot ==
Sheriff Buford Pusser continues his one-man war against moonshiners and a ruthless crime syndicate after the murder of his wife in late 1960s Tennessee.

== Cast ==
- Bo Svenson as Sheriff Buford Pusser
- Luke Askew as "Pinky" Dobson
- John Davis Chandler as Ray Henry
- Robert DoQui as Deputy Obra Eaker
- Leif Garrett as Mike Pusser
- Bruce Glover as Deputy Grady Coker
- Dawn Lyn as Dwana Pusser
- Brooke Mills as Ruby Ann
- Logan Ramsey as John Witter
- Lurene Tuttle as Grandma Helen Pusser
- Angel Tompkins as Marganne Stilson
- Noah Beery Jr. as Carl Pusser
- Richard Jaeckel as "Stud" Pardee
- Archie Grinalds as A.C. Hand
- Allen Mullikin as Floyd Tate
- Frank McRae as "Steamer" Riley
- Red West as Sheriff Tanner

== Behind the scenes ==
Joe Don Baker, who played Buford Pusser in the first film, declined to reprise his role; Pusser himself had agreed to play his own character, but died in an automobile accident before filming began. His death is discussed at the end of the movie. The police report is shown. Pusser's death would be further elaborated in the next sequel, Walking Tall: Final Chapter.
