= Bahjat (singer) =

Libyan singer and songwriter (born 1995)

Bahjat بهجت
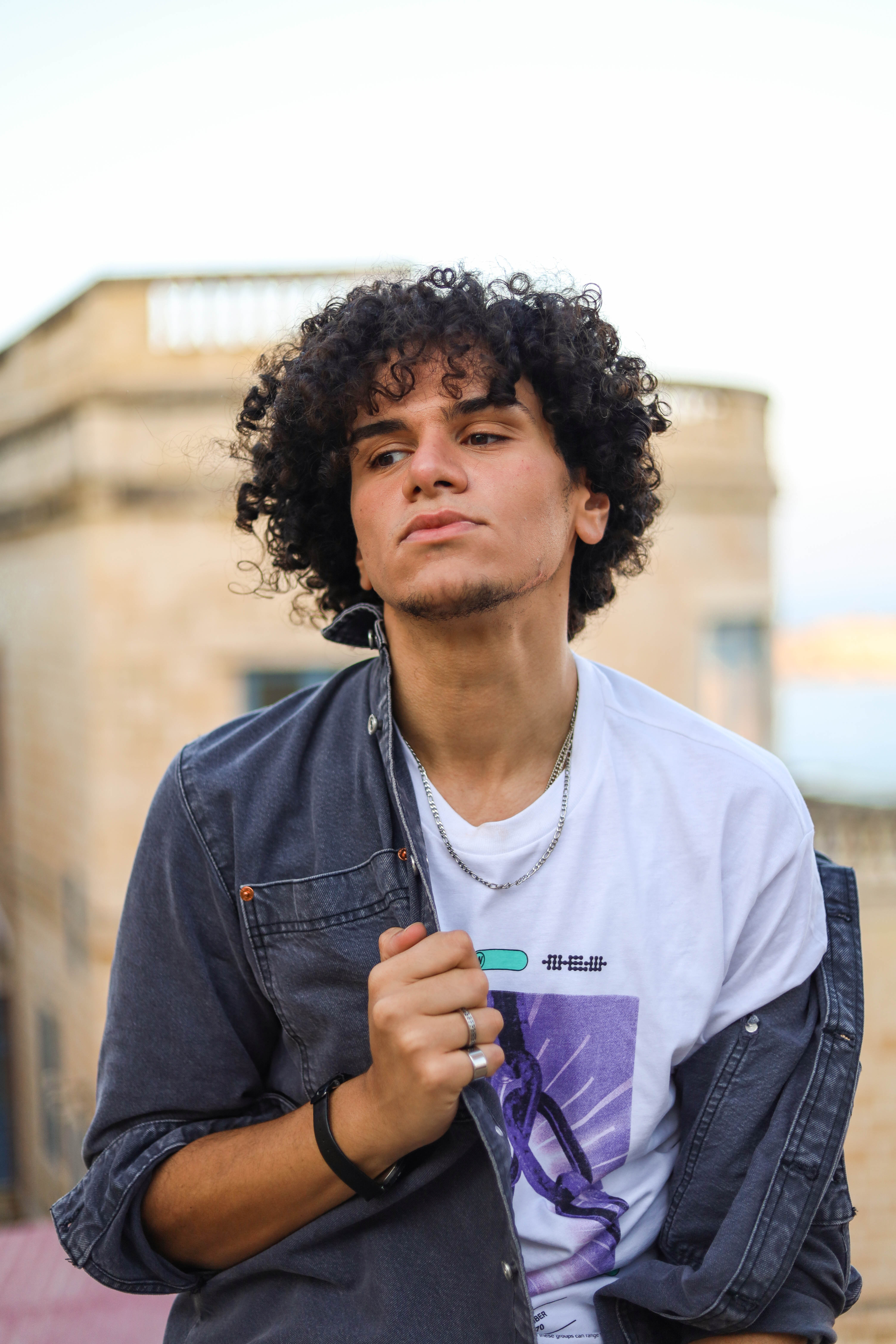

Background information
- Born: Bahjat Ahmed Etorjman; 24 June 1995 (age 31); Tripoli, Libya
- Origin: Libya
- Genres: Pop; R&B; A-pop
- Occupations: Singer; Songwriter
- Instruments: Vocals; Guitar
- Years active: 2015–present
- Website: bahjatmusic.com

Bahjat Etorjman (born 24 June 1995) is a Libyan singer and songwriter. He grew up in Tripoli, the capital of Libya before moving to Malta during the beginning of the Arab Spring in 2011. In the fall of 2017, Bahjat attended Musikmakarna, a pop music academy in the north of Sweden. Shortly after, Bahjat moved to Stockholm where he still is today making music. He is best known for his songs "Istanbul", "Hometown Smile" and "Halba".

With over 22.5 million on-demand streams and more than 70 million collective views on YouTube, Bahjat is a popular Libyan music artist. His story has earned him appearances on platforms such as BBC Arabic, Aftonbladet, Al Arabiya, The National, and The Times of Malta.

Bahjat released his first single "Stand Tall" in Malta in 2015, followed by "Talk To Me" (2016), a song that topped the Maltese charts after a month. After appearing on a Nightcore YouTube channel, Bahjat's "Hometown Smile" (2017) went viral within the community, accumulating over 65 million views on YouTube, and pushing the song to over 5 million streams on Spotify.

Following his debut EP, "3:11 am" (2017), Bahjat released the singles "Do you remember me?" (2018) and "What We Were" (2019) with both singles finding support from Spotify editorial playlists such as Fresh Finds & New Music Friday. In September 2019 Bahjat released “Istanbul”, marking the mix of Arabic and English as his signature style. “Istanbul” became one of his two most streamed songs in the Arab world in 2019.

Bahjat's release “Halba" (English: “Too Much”) in April 2020, was another steppingstone for the young artist as it helped to further elevate his career. Upon release, the song charted the top 5 of Anghami's international pop chart, and Spotify Arabia celebrated its release by inviting Bahjat to take over their official Instagram account.

Just a few months later, Bahjat released his first solo Arabic track, “Yjeek Youm” (English: “a day will come for you”). Prior to “Yjeek Youm”, Bahjat's only song in Arabic was his 2019 collaboration with Egyptian DJ/Producer Hassan El Shafei, titled “Galbek Ween”, which became the most streamed Libyan song on Anghami and one of the biggest hits of the Arab world on Spotify in 2019 with 3,5 million streams.

In early summer, Bahjat teamed up with Deezer to remake 2002's iconic “Youm Wara Youm” for the “Home Sessions” compilation. “Youm Wara Youm” is originally sung by the Moroccan artist Samira Said and Algerian artist Cheb Mami which became one of the most successful Arabic songs in history.

For his November release, “You Got That (Hometown Smile)”, Bahjat partnered with Sweden-based crowdfunding platform Corite (founded by Universal Music alumnus). The song was released as a tribute to Bahjat's own song “Hometown Smile” and its widespread message of finding home in a smile of the loved one.

== Biography ==
Bahjat Etorjman was born on June 24, 1995, in Tripoli, the capital of Libya. He has three siblings. At the age of two, Bahjat started singing, and later picked up a guitar when he was 13 years old, at which time he started writing songs. When he turned 15, his mother bought him a webcam. Using that, he uploaded his first YouTube cover, a video that showed a young aspiring artist deciding to start his music career journey.

When the Arab spring started in 2011, Bahjat and his family fled to Malta. Bahjat coped with the upheaval by continuing to write music.

In the fall of 2017, Bahjat spent a few months at Musikmakarna, a pop music academy in the north of Sweden. In the academy, he met his songwriting and production heroes Max Martin and Johan Shellback, who encouraged his talent. Shortly after, Bahjat moved to Stockholm.

== Discography ==
EPs

- 3:11 am, 2017

Singles

Title	Year	Peak chart positions	Album
Title	Year	MLT	Album
"Stand Tall"	2015	7	Non-album singles
"Talk To Me"	2016	1	Non-album singles
"Say It"	2017	1	3:11 am
"Do you remember me?"	2018	3	Non-album singles
"What We Were"	2019	4	Non-album singles
"Istanbul"	2019	—	Non-album singles
"—" denotes a recording that did not chart or was not released in that territory.
