= Lurene Tuttle =

American actress and acting coach (1907–1986)

- Tuttle in 1951
- Born: August 19, 1907; Pleasant Lake, Indiana, U.S.
- Died: May 28, 1986 (aged 78); Los Angeles, California, U.S.
- Resting place: Forest Lawn Memorial Park, Glendale, California
- Occupation: Actress
- Years active: 1934–1985
- Spouses: Melville Ruick (m. 1928; div. 1945); Frederick W. Cole (m. 1950; div. 1956)
- Children: Barbara Ruick
- Relatives: Joseph Williams (grandson)

Lurene Tuttle (August 29, 1907 – May 28, 1986) was an American actress and acting coach who performed in radio, film, and television. Making her start in vaudeville, Tuttle's most enduring impact was as one of network radio's more versatile actresses. Often appearing in 15 shows per week – comedies, dramas, thrillers, soap operas, and crime dramas – she became known as the "First Lady of Radio".

Among her best known film appearances were in Heaven Only Knows, Mr. Blandings Builds His Dream House, and the Alfred Hitchcock thriller Psycho.

== Early years ==
Tuttle was born August 29, 1907, in Pleasant Lake, Indiana, into a family with strong ties to entertainment. Her father, Clair Vivien Tuttle (1883–1950), had been a performer in minstrel shows, then became a station agent for a railroad. Her grandfather, Frank Tuttle, managed an opera house and taught drama. Her mother was Verna Sylvia (née Long) Tuttle. Lurene discovered her knack for acting after moving with her family to Glendale, Arizona. She later credited a drama coach there for "making me aware of life as it really is—by making me study life in real situations."

After her family moved to Southern California, Tuttle appeared in productions at the Pasadena Playhouse, then joined the vaudeville troupe Murphy's Comedians. By the time of the Great Depression, Tuttle had put her versatility with dialogue to work in radio, and within a decade, she became an in-demand actress in the medium.

== Radio roles ==
Tuttle's radio debut came in 1936 when she appeared on Hollywood Hotel with Dick Powell. Despite having never performed before a microphone, Tuttle's audition won her a three-year contract with the program.

Thirteen years later, one newspaper columnist called her "quite possibly the most-heard woman in America."

On radio's The Adventures of Sam Spade she played just about every female role, including Spade's secretary Effie Perrine. She appeared in such shows as The Adventures of Ozzie and Harriet and concurrently appeared on The Great Gildersleeve as the niece Marjorie Forrester. Tuttle had regular roles in such shows as Brenthouse, Dr. Christian, Duffy's Tavern, One Man's Family, The Red Skelton Show (as Junior's mother and as Daisy June, roles that she shared with Harriet Nelson), Hollywood Hotel, and Those We Love.

Dr. Christian was unusual in that the show, according to critic Leonard Maltin in The Great American Broadcast: A Celebration of Radio's Golden Age, solicited scripts from listeners (one of whom was a young Rod Serling) and put them on the air—with a little help. Tuttle recalled:

The real writers on the show had to fix them quite often a lot, because they were really quite amateurish. But they had nice thoughts, they had nice plots. They just needed fixing; the dialogue didn't work too well.

Tuttle guest starred on the radio police series Dragnet, starring Jack Webb, Lux Radio Theatre, The Screen Guild Theater and Suspense, in the episode "The Sisters", with Rosalind Russell. In The Whistler, she played good and evil twins and used separate microphones to stay in character for each twin.

It was during her time on Hollywood Hotel that Tuttle became involved in the founding of the American Federation of Radio Artists. According to Maltin, Tuttle's male counterpart on the show, Frank Nelson (a frequent guest performer on Jack Benny's program), tried to get both a raise to $35 per show—at a time when the show paid $5,000 per appearance to headlining guest stars. Nelson eventually got the raises, but the negotiations prompted him to become an AFRA co-founder and one of its active members.

Tuttle later became the first female president of the federation's Hollywood local.

== Films and television ==
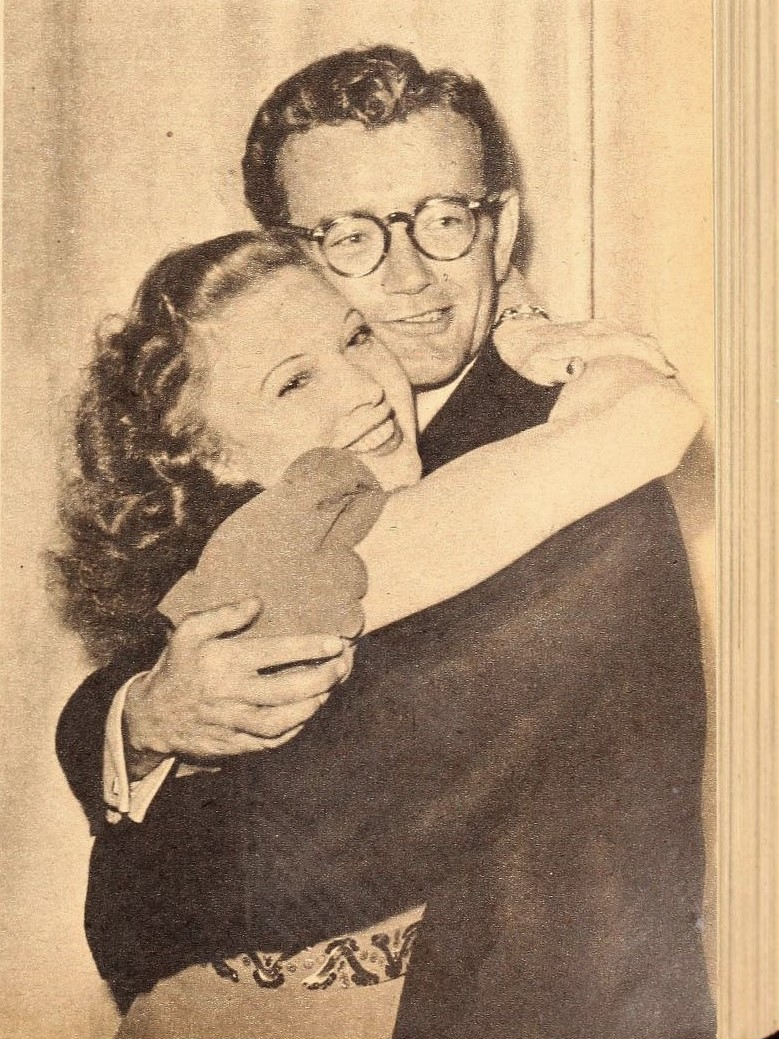
With Robert Walker, 1946

On television and in films, Tuttle streamlined herself into a pattern of roles between wise, loving wives/mothers or bristling matrons. She was familiar to the early television audience as wife/mother Lavinia "Vinnie" Day in Life with Father (1953–1955). Columnist Hedda Hopper called the selection of Leon Ames as Father and Tuttle as Mother "what I consider 22 carat casting with two all-Americans."

Heaven Only Knows (1947) was her first film. She went on to appear in such films as Orson Welles's Macbeth (1948, as one of the Three Witches), Mr. Blandings Builds His Dream House (1948, as Mr. Blandings' secretary, Mary), and Alfred Hitchcock's Psycho (1960, as the wife of Sheriff Chambers). In Don't Bother to Knock (1952), she portrayed a mother who unknowingly lets a disturbed woman (played by Marilyn Monroe) babysit her daughter. The next year she appeared again with Monroe in Niagara, as Mrs. Kettering. She had a rare starring role in Ma Barker's Killer Brood (1960). She played Grandma Pusser in the original Walking Tall film trilogy, and also appeared in horror films such as The Manitou (1978), starring Tony Curtis. Her final film role was in the 1983 film Testament.

Tuttle became a familiar face to millions of television viewers with more than 100 appearances from 1950 to 1986, often in the role of an inquisitive busybody. She guest-starred twice on Edmond O'Brien's 1960 crime drama Johnny Midnight. She then played a supporting role in the 1961–1962 television situation comedy Father of the Bride. She made six guest appearances on Perry Mason, with Raymond Burr, during the nine-year run of the show from 1957 to 1966. She played the defendant four times: Anna Houser in "The Case of the Substitute Face" in 1958, Sarette Winslow in "The Case of the Artful Dodger" in 1959, Sarah Breel in "The Case of the Shoplifter's Shoe" in 1963, and Josephine Kempton in "The Case of the Grinning Gorilla" in 1965. In 1966, she played Henny McLeod in "The Case of the Avenging Angel".

In 1958 and 1959, she was cast in two episodes as Gladys Purvis, the mother of series character Kate McCoy, played by Kathleen Nolan, in the sitcom The Real McCoys, with Walter Brennan and Richard Crenna. She appeared twice on the NBC Western series The Californians, once as Belle Calhoun in "Skeleton in the Closet" (1958) and then as Maude Sorel in "The Painted Lady" (1959). She guest-starred with Andrew Duggan in his crime series Bourbon Street Beat.

Tuttle appeared three times each on sitcoms The Danny Thomas Show and Petticoat Junction and twice on the following: Leave It to Beaver, The Bob Cummings Show, The Ann Sothern Show, Pete and Gladys, The Andy Griffith Show, Hazel, General Electric Theater, Switch, and Fantasy Island; she appeared as Lee Meriwether's aunt in the final episode of Barnaby Jones in 1980.

In 1960, she was cast as Mrs. Courtland in the episode "The Raffle Ticket" of the sitcom based on the comic strip Dennis the Menace, with Jay North and Joseph Kearns.

She also played the part of Eddie Haskell's landlady in Leave It to Beaver's 1962 episode called "Bachelor at Large".

Tuttle guest-starred in such Westerns as Buckskin, The Restless Gun, Colt .45, Johnny Ringo, The Cowboys, Little House on the Prairie, Wanted Dead or Alive, Bonanza, Gunsmoke, The Adventures of Jim Bowie, Lawman, and The Iron Horse. She played Ma Deaver in Have Gun – Will Travel S1 E32 "The Five Books of Owen Deaver" which aired 4/25/1958. In 1959 she appeared on Wagon Train S3 E14 "The Lita Foladaire Story" as Mrs. Willoughby.

Tuttle was cast as Mrs. Grange in the 1963 episode "The Risk" on the drama series Mr. Novak, starring James Franciscus as an idealistic high school teacher. She later appeared on the popular 1960s sitcoms I Dream of Jeannie, The Munsters, and Petticoat Junction.

Tuttle's best-known role to the general public was likely in 32 episodes of the series Julia (1968–1971) as Hannah Yarby. In 1972, she appeared as Bella Swann on the episode "Farmer Ted and the News" on The Mary Tyler Moore Show and as Mrs. Sharp on The Partridge Family.

In 1980, Tuttle appeared as Mrs. McIntyre in the television movie White Mama, with Bette Davis. From 1981 to 1984, Tuttle appeared six times on the drama series Trapper John, M.D. One of her later roles was in episode 25 ("Murder in the Afternoon") of Murder, She Wrote as Agnes Cochran. The episode first aired on October 13, 1985.

She served as a board member of the Screen Actors Guild from 1951 to 1954.

== Recognition ==
In 1944, Tuttle received Radio Life magazine's Distinguished Achievement Award for Best Supporting Feminine Player.

Tuttle has two stars on the Hollywood Walk of Fame – "Star of Radio" at 1760 Vine Street and "Star of Television" at 7011 Hollywood Boulevard. Both stars were dedicated February 8, 1960.

== Personal life ==
Tuttle married Melville Ruick, an actor whom she had met during her radio years; the couple had a daughter, Barbara (1930–1974), who was married to film composer John Williams.

Tuttle and Ruick eventually divorced. She then married Frederick W. Cole, an engineer, on November 27, 1950, in Pasadena, California. She sued him for divorce on January 4, 1956.

She became a respected acting coach and teacher, even making time for it at the height of her acting career. She often re-trained radio actors who had been away from the craft during service in World War II.

Tuttle had a hobby of collecting toy dogs. A 1930 newspaper article reported "Her dressing room shelf is filled with more than 200 miniature replicas of every variety of dog known."

She was a deeply dedicated union advocate. She was a charter member of the American Federation of Radio Artists, helping unionize the industry to secure better wages for radio actors. She briefly served as the first female president of the AFRA Los Angeles Local in 1944 and later served on the board of the Screen Actors Guild from 1951 to 1954 alongside SAG President Ronald Reagan.

Tuttle's lifelong commitment to conservative politics was heavily channelled through her active involvement with prominent industry organizations, most notably the Hollywood Republican Committee and the Motion Picture Alliance for the Preservation of American Ideals. Operating within these circles alongside staunchly anti-communist figures like Walt Disney, John Wayne, and George Murphy, she worked to promote conservative principles and defend classic American cultural values within the entertainment industry. Beyond her institutional presence, Tuttle was an enthusiastic and reliable campaign surrogate who publicly endorsed, raised funds for, or volunteered on behalf of several generations of Republican presidential candidates. Her partisan dedication spanned decades of the mid-to-late 20th century, encompassing early support for Thomas E. Dewey and extensive campaigning for Dwight D. Eisenhower's 1952 election. This commitment continued through the conservative movement led by Barry Goldwater in 1964, the administrations of Richard Nixon and Gerald Ford, and ultimately culminated in her support for her former Screen Actors Guild colleague, Ronald Reagan.

== Death ==
Tuttle died from cancer on May 28, 1986, at a hospital in Encino, California. Memorial services were held June 2, 1986, at Church of the Recessional at Forest Lawn Memorial Park, Glendale.

Her Sam Spade co-star Howard Duff, who delivered her eulogy, remembered Tuttle:

She could just take hold of a part and do something with it...I think she never met a part she didn't like. She just loved to work; she loved to act. She's a woman who was born to do what she was doing and loved every minute of it.

== Filmography ==
- Stand Up and Cheer! (1934) – Stenographer (uncredited)
- Tom, Dick and Harry (1941) – Girl Lead in Movie (voice, uncredited)
- Heaven Only Knows (1947) – Mrs. O'Donnell
- Mr. Blandings Builds His Dream House (1948) – Mary
- Homecoming (1948) – Miss Stoker
- Macbeth (1948) – Witch / Gentlewoman to Lady Macduff
- The Admiral Was a Lady (1950) – Unemployment Clerk (uncredited)
- A Life of Her Own (1950) – Secretary (uncredited)
- Watch the Birdie (1950) – Millie (uncredited)
- Goodbye, My Fancy (1951) – Ellen Griswold
- Tomorrow Is Another Day (1951) – Stella Dawson
- The Whip Hand (1951) – Molly Loomis
- Room for One More (1952) – Miss Kenyon
- Don't Bother to Knock (1952) – Ruth Jones
- Niagara (1953) – Mrs. Kettering
- Never Wave at a WAC (1953) – Capt. Murchinson, Company CO
- The Affairs of Dobie Gillis (1953) – Mrs. Eleanor Hammer
- Give a Girl a Break (1953) – Mrs. Doolittle
- The Glass Slipper (1955) – Cousin Loulou
- Sincerely Yours (1955) – Mrs. McGinley
- Slander (1957) – Mrs. Doyle
- Untamed Youth (1957) – Judge Cecilia Steele Tropp
- Sweet Smell of Success (1957) – Loretta Bartha (uncredited)
- Ma Barker's Killer Brood (1960) – Ma Barker
- Psycho (1960) – Mrs. Chambers
- Critic's Choice (1963) – Mother in "Sisters Three"
- The Shoplifters (1964) – The Shoplifter
- Nightmare in the Sun (1965) – Gideon's wife
- The Restless Ones (1965)
- The Ghost and Mr. Chicken (1966) – Mrs. Natalie Miller
- The Fortune Cookie (1966) – Mother Hinkle
- The Horse in the Gray Flannel Suit (1968) – Aunt Martha
- Walking Tall (1973) – Grandma
- "Down and Dirty Duck" (1974) – Duck's Mother (voice)
- Walking Tall Part 2 (1975) – Grandma Pusser
- The World Through the Eyes of Children (1975) – Tuttle
- Evil Town (1977) – Mildred Phelps
- Walking Tall: Final Chapter (1977) – Grandma Pusser
- The Manitou (1978) – Mrs. Herz
- The Story of Heidi (1979) – Clara's Grandmother (voice)
- Nutcracker Fantasy (1979) – Aunt Gerda (voice)
- Parts: The Clonus Horror (1979) – Anna Noble
- Human Experiments (1979) – Granny
- The Dukes of Hazzard (1979–1985) – Annie Cargill
- White Mama (1980) – Mrs. McIntyre
- Return of the Beverly Hillbillies (1981) – Mollie Heller
- Testament (1983) – Rosemary Abhart
- It Came Upon the Midnight Clear (1984) – Mrs. Hunt

== Records ==
Tuttle played the swallow in "The Happy Prince", an adaption of Oscar Wilde's short story with Orson Welles and Bing Crosby (1946). The story had been adapted for radio by Orson Welles in 1944, featuring a musical score by Bernard Herrmann. It aired on the Philco Radio Hall of Fame broadcast on December 24, 1944 with Lurene Tuttle playing The Swallow and featuring Bing Crosby alongside Orson Welles, with Herrmann's music conducted by Victor Young.
