= Finger Man =

1955 film by Harold D. Schuster

- Theatrical release poster
- Directed by: Harold D. Schuster
- Written by: Warren Douglas
- Story by: Norris Lipsius; John Lardner
- Produced by: Lindsley Parsons; John H. Burrows
- Starring: Frank Lovejoy; Forrest Tucker; Peggie Castle
- Cinematography: William A. Sickner
- Edited by: Maurice Wright
- Music by: Paul Dunlap
- Production company: Lindsley Parsons Productions
- Distributed by: Allied Artists Pictures
- Release date: June 15, 1955 (United States)
- Running time: 82 minutes
- Country: United States
- Language: English

Finger Man is a 1955 American crime film noir directed by Harold D. Schuster and starring Frank Lovejoy, Forrest Tucker and Peggie Castle.

== Plot ==
Ex-convict Casey Martin is caught heisting a truck shipment. After he discovers the depths of drug addiction his sister, Lucille, has fallen into after working for mobster Dutch Becker, Casey accepts the deal police have offered him. He goes to work undercover to nail Dutch and his gang; if he survives and is successful, Casey will receive immunity from prosecution.

Gladys Baker worked for Dutch for a long time. She has been an associate of Casey's as well and is falling for him. She tells him about her relationship with the mob man and casts her lot with Casey; this gets her murdered by Dutch's sadistic chief henchman Lou Terpe. In the end Casey brings down the gang and, while he is allowed his freedom, he walks off into a still uncertain future, Dutch's promise of revenge hanging over his head.

== Cast ==
- Frank Lovejoy as Casey Martin
- Forrest Tucker as Dutch Becker
- Peggie Castle as Gladys Baker
- Timothy Carey as Lou Terpe
- John Cliff as Johnny Cooper
- William F. Leicester as Jim Rogers (as William Leicester)
- Glen Gordon as Carlos Armor (as Glenn Gordon)
- John Close as 'Big' Walters
- Hugh Sanders as Mr. Burns
- Evelyn Eaton as Lucille Martin
- Charles Maxwell as Fred Amory
- Dorothy Green

== See also ==
- List of American films of 1955
