= Standing Tall =

Standing Tall may refer to:

- Standing Tall (film), a 2015 French film
- Standing Tall (Billie Jo Spears album), 1980
  - "Standing Tall" (song), the title song; covered by Lorrie Morgan, 1995
- Standing Tall (The Crusaders album) or the title song, 1980
- Standing Tall (Kym Marsh album) or the title song, 2003

== See also ==
- Stand Tall (disambiguation)
- Walking Tall (disambiguation)
