= Heather McAdam =

American actress (b. 1968)

- Occupation: Actress
- Years active: 1979–present
- Children: 2
- Website: www.heathermcadamofficial.com

Heather McAdam is an American actress.

McAdam's major acting projects have included the roles of Catherine "Cat" Margolis in the television series Sisters (1991–96), Dwana Pusser in Walking Tall (1981), and Michelle Ryan in Salvage 1 (1979). She has also made guest appearances on several other TV shows including Touched by an Angel, Beverly Hills, 90210, Quantum Leap, The Facts of Life, Doogie Howser, M.D., and Matlock.
