= Filthy Riches =

- Genre: Reality television
- No. of seasons: 2
- No. of episodes: 16

Production
- Running time: 44 minutes

Original release
- Network: National Geographic
- Release: April 20, 2014 – June 24, 2015

Filthy Riches is an American television series that aired on the National Geographic Channel. It premiered on April 20, 2014.

== Cast ==
- Ray Turner (eel fisherman)
- Billy Taylor, Caleb Taylor & Levi Monroe (ginseng hunters)
- Jim Campbell & Andy Johns (bloodworm diggers)
- Greg Dahl & Albert "Al" DeSilva (burl hunters)
- Chris Matherly & Levena Holmes (mushroom hunters)

== Premise ==
From the backwoods of Tennessee or Maryland to the mud flats of Maine, the series spotlights individuals hunting and foraging for eels, bloodworms, the ginseng plant, wild mushrooms, and burl, all for commercial use.

== Episodes ==
=== Season 1 (2014) ===
No. overall	No. in season	Title	Original release date
1	1	"Harvest Moon"	April 20, 2014
2	2	"Hungry for Money"	April 27, 2014
3	3	"High Stakes, High Reward"	May 4, 2014
4	4	"Go Big or Go Home"	May 11, 2014
5	5	"Livin' Off the Land"	May 18, 2014
6	6	"In It to Win It"	May 25, 2014
7	7	"No Guts, No Glory"	June 1, 2014
8	8	"All or Nothing"	June 7, 2014

=== Season 2 (2015) ===
No. overall	No. in season	Title	Original release date
9	1	"Bloodworms, Eels & Gators"	May 6, 2015
10	2	"Dying for Dollars"	May 13, 2015
11	3	"Big Gator, Small Boat"	May 20, 2015
12	4	"Monster Storm"	May 27, 2015
13	5	"Revenge & Redemption"	June 3, 2015
14	6	"Smoke 'Em"	June 10, 2015
15	7	"Turf Wars"	June 17, 2015
16	8	"Winter Warriors"	June 24, 2015
