= Walter Scharf =

American composer and arranger (1910-2003)

Background information
- Born: August 1, 1910; Manhattan, New York City, U.S.
- Died: February 24, 2003 (aged 92) Brentwood, Los Angeles, California, U.S.
- Genres: Film, TV, stage and radio
- Occupations: Film composer; conductor; arranger; musician
- Instrument: Piano
- Label: Jubilee Records

Walter Scharf (August 1, 1910 – February 24, 2003) was an American musician, best known as a film, television and concert composer and arranger/conductor.

== Biography ==
=== Broadway theatre ===
Born in Manhattan, he was the son of Yiddish theatre comic Bessie Zwerling (Yiddish: בעססיע זצערלינג). While in his 20s, he was one of the orchestrators for George Gershwin's Broadway musical Girl Crazy, became singer Helen Morgan's accompanist, and later worked as pianist and arranger for singer Rudy Vallee.

=== Film ===
He began working in Hollywood in 1933, arranging for Al Jolson at Warner Bros., Alice Faye at 20th Century-Fox and Bing Crosby at Paramount. He orchestrated the original version of Irving Berlin's White Christmas for the film Holiday Inn (1942), and from 1942 to 1946 he served as head of music for Republic Pictures.

From 1948 to 1954, Scharf was arranger-conductor for the Phil Harris-Alice Faye radio show.

A ten-time Oscar nominee, Scharf worked on more than 100 films, receiving nominations for his musical direction on such pictures as Danny Kaye's Hans Christian Andersen (1952), Barbra Streisand's Funny Girl (1968) and Willy Wonka & the Chocolate Factory (1971).

In the early 1960s, he was approached by Harold Lloyd to provide new scores for his silent film compilations. Lloyd regarded Scharf's ability to mix comedy themes with big, dramatic orchestral touches as ideal for his brand of 'thrill' comedy.

Scharf implemented a similar style for the Jerry Lewis Jekyll and Hyde-inspired comedy The Nutty Professor in (1963), working on more than a dozen Lewis comedies overall. He worked on three Elvis Presley pictures including Loving You (1957) and King Creole (1958), and with lyricist Don Black, he wrote the hit Michael Jackson single from the film Ben (1972), which won him a Golden Globe; and scored the popular Walking Tall (1973) and its two sequels. In 1973, he and Don Black wrote the music and lyrics for the London musical Maybe That's Your Problem (book by Lionel Chetwynd).

=== Television ===
Scharf composed music for dozens of television dramas including Ben Casey, The Man from U.N.C.L.E., Mission: Impossible, and the 1979 miniseries From Here to Eternity and Blind Ambition, although he became best known for his music for the National Geographic Society and The Undersea World of Jacques Cousteau documentaries, which he scored between 1965 and 1975. He received two Emmys for the Cousteau series, in 1970 and 1974, and composed an original symphonic work, The Legend of the Living Sea, for a Cousteau museum exhibit aboard the RMS Queen Mary in 1971.

=== Concert writing ===
Scharf's initial work for the concert hall was The Palestine Suite, written in 1945 and performed at the Hollywood Bowl under Leopold Stokowski. After retiring from films and TV in the 1980s, he returned to concert writing, notably with The Tree Still Stands: A Symphonic Portrait of the Stages of a Hebraic Man, commissioned by the Stephen S. Wise Temple and first performed in 1989, and the 1993 Israeli Suite. He also wrote an unproduced opera based on Norman Corwin's The Plot to Overthrow Christmas.

Scharf died of heart failure at his home in the Brentwood neighborhood of Los Angeles, at the age of 92.

== Awards and honors ==
Scharf was a ten-time Oscar nominee, working on more than 100 films, receiving nominations for his musical direction on such pictures as Danny Kaye's Hans Christian Andersen (1952), Barbra Streisand's Funny Girl (1968) and Willy Wonka & the Chocolate Factory (1971).

Scharf received the Golden Score Award from the American Society of Music Arrangers and Composers in 1997.

== Selected filmography ==
- Josette (1938)
- Hit Parade of 1941 (1940)
- Thumbs Up (1943)
- Someone to Remember (1943)
- In Old Oklahoma (1943)
- The Fighting Seabees (1944)
- The Lady and the Monster
- Atlantic City (1944)
- Lake Placid Serenade (1944)
- Earl Carroll Vanities (1945)
- The Cheaters (1945)
- Mexicana (1945)
- Dakota (1945)
- I've Always Loved You (1946)
- Casbah (1948)
- The Saxon Charm (1948)
- City Across the River (1949)
- Red Canyon (1949)
- Take One False Step (1949)
- Yes Sir, That's My Baby (1949)
- Buccaneer's Girl (1950)
- Sierra (1950)
- South Sea Sinner (1950)
- Deported (1950)
- Winchester '73 (1950)
- The Court Jester (1955)
- Time Table (1956)
- Three Violent People (1957)
- The Joker Is Wild (1957)
- The Geisha Boy (1958)
- Don't Give Up the Ship (1959)
- The Bellboy (1960)
- Cinderfella (1960)
- Pocketful of Miracles (1961)
- The Ladies Man (1961)
- The Errand Boy (1961)
- Harold Lloyd's World of Comedy (1962)
- It's Only Money (1962)
- My Six Loves (1963)
- The Nutty Professor (1963)
- Honeymoon Hotel (1964)
- Where Love Has Gone (1964)
- Funny Girl (1968)
- Pendulum (1969)
- If It's Tuesday, This Must Be Belgium (1969)
- The Cheyenne Social Club (1970)
- Willy Wonka & the Chocolate Factory (1971)
- Ben (1972)
- Walking Tall (1973)
- Walking Tall Part 2 (1975)
- Walking Tall: Final Chapter (1977)
- When Every Day Was the Fourth of July (1978)
- The Triangle Factory Fire Scandal (1979)
- The Scarlett O'Hara War (1980)
- Twilight Time (1982)
