= Pete Halat =

American politician & criminal (born 1942)

Mayor of Biloxi, Mississippi
- In office 1989–1993

Personal details
- Born: Peter J. Halat Jr. July 27, 1942 (age 84)

Peter J. Halat Jr. (born July 27, 1942) is an American politician and lawyer who served as the twelfth mayor of Biloxi, Mississippi, and was later convicted and served time for his involvement in a criminal conspiracy which led to the 1987 murders of Halat's former law partner, Mississippi judge Vincent Sherry, and Sherry's wife Margaret, a Biloxi city councilwoman. He was found guilty and sentenced to 18 years in prison, of which he served 15.

Halat was elected mayor in 1989. He lost a re-election bid in a three-way race in 1993 by just 17 votes out of 8,564 total cast following the posting of the final tally. The FBI investigation eventually ended the city's long tolerance for wide open, illegal gambling and striptease clubs with exorbitantly priced drinks, the purchase of which served as a front for prostitution.

== History ==
Pete Halat and Vincent Sherry became law partners in 1981. Sherry was appointed and sworn in as a circuit judge on July 28, 1986.

=== Dixie Mafia killings ===
Through his association with Mike Gillich, a leading Biloxi underworld figure, Halat became the attorney for Kirksey Nix, a Dixie Mafia criminal serving life in the Louisiana State Penitentiary for the 1971 murder of New Orleans grocer Frank J. Corso. Having exhausted his appeals, Nix's only path to freedom was a governor's pardon. In the hopes of earning enough money to buy an illicit pardon, Nix was running a dating scam from inside prison targeting homosexual males. By personal ads and letters, Nix would pose as a gay single man and entice victims into a relationship, frequently by sending sexually explicit photos cut out from magazines. He would then concoct fictitious stories for needing money, such as being in trouble with the law and needing to pay hefty legal expenses or needing additional money in order to move in with a victim. The operation was run from both Nix's prison cell in Louisiana and, after Vincent Sherry left the law firm to become a judge, by Nix's girlfriend Sheri LaRa Sharpe at the Halat and Sherry law office.

Nix's co-conspirator Halat had stolen hundreds of thousands of dollars from Nix to cover financial difficulties and blamed the theft of the money on Vincent Sherry. Kirksey Nix believed Halat's claim and ordered the deaths of Judge Sherry and his wife. Thomas Holcomb was hired by Nix to murder the couple in their home.

=== Conviction ===
On October 23, 1996, Halat was indicted on federal charges related to his involvement in the 1987 murders of Vincent and Margaret Sherry. At the time, the FBI believed that the two were killed on Halat's orders after he thought that Judge Sherry was stealing from a bank account Halat kept for an imprisoned client, which held funds from Kirksey Nix's "Lonely Hearts" dating scam targeting gay men. It would later turn out however, that Vincent Sherry had never stolen money from Kirksey Nix's dating scam and that it was in fact Pete Halat himself who had stolen upwards of $100,000 U.S. dollars from the Lonely Hearts scam. When Nix was enraged over noticing the amount of missing money and arranged for Pete Halat to visit him in prison and demanded an explanation from him, Halat quickly blamed Judge Sherry for the theft of the illicit funds and the two quietly agreed to have Judge Sherry and his wife murdered. Shortly thereafter, Kirksey Nix ordered the deaths of Vincent and Margaret Sherry for the alleged theft of his money, and the Dixie Mafia's leader on the streets, Mike Gillich, hired a hitman from Texas named Thomas Holcomb to commit the two murders. Holcomb was given the handgun with a homemade silencer and ammunition, which he used in the killings by Kirksey Nix's girlfriend Sheri LaRa Sharpe, who in turn had received the gun from an enforcer for the Dixie Mafia named John Ransom who told her to give the gun to Holcomb for the hit on Mr. and Mrs. Sherry.

Halat was later convicted in 1997 of conspiracy to commit racketeering, obstruction of justice, conspiracy to obstruct justice, and conspiracy to commit wire fraud and was sentenced to serve 18 years in prison.

=== Release ===
Halat was released in 2013 after 15 years, 9 months and 7 days in jail at the age of 70. He then worked at a church in Hattiesburg for the remainder of the year. Halat still maintains he had no part in the murder plot.

== Co-conspirators ==
Kirksey McCord Nix Jr. (born 1943) is serving life imprisonment in the Federal Correctional Institution at El Reno, Oklahoma. Mike Gillich died of cancer in 2012. Thomas Leslie Holcomb, a Texas-based contract killer, was convicted of carrying out the killings and died in prison in 2005. John Ransom and Sheri LaRa Sharpe were both convicted in 1991 on federal conspiracy charges related to the two murders. Ransom was the Dixie Mafia hitman who supplied the gun used in the murders of Vincent and Margaret Sherry. Sharpe was Kirksey Nix's girlfriend who worked as a legal aid and helped him run his Lonely Hearts dating scam while he was in prison. The scam involved placing fraudulent ads in the national LGBT magazine The Advocate pretending to be young single homosexual men in legal trouble who needed money.

== Media portrayals ==
A 1999 episode of The FBI Files details the FBI investigation of the Dixie Mafia, Pete Halat, and Kirksey Nix and his Lonely Hearts scam. The case was featured as well in Dominick Dunne's program Power, Privilege, and Justice on January 31, 2007. It is also featured in Season 1, episode 5 of Unusual Suspects, Season 1, episode 1 of City Confidential, and in The 1980's; The Deadliest Decade" The Dixieland Murders.
