= Dixie Mafia =

American criminal organization

- Founded: Late 1960s
- Founding location: Biloxi, Mississippi, United States
- Years active: c. 1960s–present
- Territory: Southeastern United States
- Ethnicity: White Southerner
- Activities: Illegal gambling, drug trafficking, prostitution, robbery, murder, arson, extortion, fraud, bootlegging, rumrunning, police corruption, and political corruption
- Allies: Chicago Outfit; New Orleans crime family; State Line Mob

The Dixie Mafia, or the Dixie Mob, originally referred to a loosely connected criminal organization that was based in Biloxi, Mississippi and which operated primarily throughout the Southern United States from the 1960s to the 1980s. It engaged in burglary, theft, robbery and fencing. Their activities eventually expanded into the illegal trade in tobacco, alcohol, marijuana and methamphetamine, as well as contract killings and blackmail. Some of the more well-known members were Mike Gillich, Todd Anthony and Kirksey Nix.

It is now a general term for independent gangs and criminal networks composed of White Southerners who engage in a variety of criminal activities, from drug dealing, pimping, gambling, robberies and burglaries to contract killings.

== Early days ==
Beginning in the 1960s, the Dixie Mafia began working as a loosely knit group of traveling criminals performing residential burglary, robbery, and theft. The gang did not function with a set chain of command, with the concept that whoever made the most money deserved to be boss. Despite the informal structure, the Dixie Mafia had one rule that members were expected to obey: "Thou shall not snitch to the cops".

Unlike members of the American Mafia, the members of the Dixie mafia were not connected by family or country of origin. They were loosely connected individuals of many nationalities with a common goal—to make money and wield control over illegal moneymaking operations by any means, including influence peddling, bribery of public officials, and murder.

The gang became known for carrying out contract killings, particularly against former members. During its peak, from the early 1960s to the late 1980s, dozens of people were murdered (usually shot) by its members. Victims were most often murdered because they testified, or threatened to testify, against fellow members.

"The Strip" in Biloxi, Mississippi, was home base for the Dixie Mafia, and Mike Gillich, Jr., was the group's unofficial but de facto kingpin. Of Croatian descent and from a large, poor family, he had raised himself in the city's Point Cadet section to become a wealthy entrepreneur along "The Strip". He owned a string of motels and nightclubs that doubled as strip joints and gambling dens, as well as a bingo parlor. He was known and trusted by almost every member of the Dixie Mafia, especially those who trusted no one else. In the words of one investigator of the Sherry murders, "Mr. Mike runs the criminals' post office. He's their banker."

Gillich was also patron and protector of Kirksey McCord Nix Jr., one of the gang's most notable members. In December 1965, at the age of 22, Nix was caught carrying illegal automatic weapons in Fort Smith, Arkansas. An old friend of his, Juanda Jones, ran a bordello there, and Nix became involved with Jones' adolescent daughter, Sheri LaRa. In later years, she played a key role in his operations, including direct ties to the murders of Vince and Margaret Sherry. Edward Humes, in his 1994 book, Mississippi Mud, chronicled their murders and the subsequent investigation of Gillich, Nix, Bobby Fabian, and others who were involved either loosely or actively in the murders. With the aid of his father's connections in neighboring Oklahoma, Nix beat the weapons charges in Fort Smith and moved on to other crimes. He was suspected in the gangland-style murder of a gambler named Harry Bennett, who was about to turn state's evidence against several Dixie Mafia members. Although Nix's involvement in Bennett's murder was never proven, this incident precipitated a string of killings that left 25 people dead in six states over the next four years.

Nix was a suspect in the attempted assassination of McNairy County, Tennessee Sheriff Buford Pusser, and in the murder of Pusser's wife. Nix was also convicted of murdering wealthy New Orleans grocery owner Frank Corso. At the time of the murder, Nix was believed to be employed by Darrel Ward in Clarksville, Texas. Ward was a noted associate of Chicago Mob boss Sam Giancana, and is thought to have controlled organized crime and bootlegging throughout Texas, Louisiana, Arkansas, and Mississippi. The Dixie Mafia was strongly connected to the State Line Mob and its leader, Carl Douglas White.

One member was George Fuqua who had connections with the local Dallas criminal element down in Texas. In 1960 he and James Henry Dolan flew out to Miami Beach on behalf of Florida boss Santo Trafficante Jr. Dolan and Fuqua went out to deal with bolita men who were not doing as Trafficante had wanted. As payment they were allowed to keep whatever cash the bolita operators had in their possession. At the first stop they netted $7000 and then proceeded to the next where they were again successful. Fuqua also knew R. D. Matthews, also from Dallas.

== Dixie Mafia's locales ==
The Dixie Mafia's origins were in the Appalachian states, which had a regionalism dating back to the Whiskey Rebellion and the secessionist movement resulting, briefly, in the state of Franklin (Eastern Tennessee). This view that the federal government is oppressive and that criminal enterprise against it is justified spread from its place of origin to wealthier regions where the Dixie Mafia operated; primarily in Texas, Louisiana, Arkansas, Georgia, Mississippi, and Alabama, particularly around the cities of Birmingham, Baton Rouge, Hattiesburg, Corinth, Dallas, and Atlanta. Some of the group's criminal activities were in more obscure parts of their major areas of operation, making the group and their activities harder to pinpoint.

The Dixie Mafia committed most of their crimes in areas that lacked strong, coordinated law enforcement, particularly in small communities throughout the South (such as Andalusia, Alabama). In doing so, murders, intimidation, or other criminal activities could take place with less risk of local law enforcement being able to directly link the crimes to the organization. Small-town and county law enforcement agencies, especially in poorer sections of the South up to the 1990s, were usually inadequately equipped, and rarely had officers with extensive experience in the investigation of homicide or organized crime.

The members of the Dixie Mafia usually created small, seemingly legitimate businesses such as buying and selling junk or antiques. These businesses provided fronts for the operators to buy and sell stolen items provided by others within the network. The businesses usually operated until they aroused suspicion, then moved to another location.

Many members of the Dixie Mafia were former state or federal prisoners. Members were usually recruited while in prison; a history of violent behavior was generally a prerequisite to becoming a member. According to an article in the Las Vegas Review-Journal, the gang was well known for its violence in collecting debts owed to gambling houses and strip clubs.

The terms "Dixie Mafia" and "Southern Mafia" have been used interchangeably. Documented use of the two terms existed as early as 1993, when Scarfone wrote about the "Dixie Mafia" or the "Southern Mafia" working together with the "Italian Mafia" in the South. His accounts of the "Good Ol' Boy's Southern-Mafia" in parts 3 and 4 of the article describe the group's indigenous nature. Whether all journalistic and literary references to the "Dixie Mafia" and the "Southern Mafia" refer to the same group of individuals is unclear. Therefore, these terms have become a general reference to any illegal enterprise in the Southern states that, for cultural reasons, can expect a certain amount of support, both intended and unintended, from the local population.

== Infiltration into law enforcement ==
The Dixie Mafia was especially notorious for infiltrating law enforcement agencies in many poor Southern counties; members could easily use patronage, influence-peddling, and money to obtain jobs as sheriffs and sworn deputies. The Federal Bureau of Investigation reported on this infiltration: "It was out of control," said retired Special Agent Keith Bell, referring to the level of corruption in Biloxi and Harrison County—so much so that in 1983 federal authorities would designate the entire Harrison County Sheriff's Office as a criminal enterprise. The Dixie Mafia sheriffs and officers loyal to them "were doing anything and everything illegal down [there]... For money, [they] would release prisoners from the county jail, safeguard drug shipments, and hide fugitives. Anything you can think of, they were involved in." In some locations the infiltration was so bad that "corrupt local sheriffs and deputies regularly extorted local businesses, aided prostitution, and in some cases murdered their political opponents in cold blood."

== In popular culture ==
The Dixie Mafia is featured in the American TV shows Justified, Claws, The Righteous Gemstones, Tulsa King and Young Sheldon. It is an antagonist faction in the video game Mafia III. The fictitious leader of the Dixie Mafia in the game, Ritchie Doucet, is a prominent antagonist in the early section of the game. In the video game Grand Theft Auto: Vice City Stories, a gang called the Trailer Park Mafia, led by Marty J. Williams, is loosely based on the Dixie Mafia. Author John Grisham utilizes the tales of the Dixie Mafia in his fictional book "Boys from Biloxi".

The Dixie Mafia was featured in episodes of American true crime, documentary series City Confidential (Season 1. Ep. 1, "Deadly Odds in Biloxi") and The FBI Files (Season 2. Ep. 7, "The Dixie Mafia").

== See also ==
- Burley tobacco—cash crop whose harvesting, warehousing, and curing technology has been adapted, with little alteration, to marijuana
- Cornbread Mafia
- Cowboy Mafia
- State Line Mob
