= Stand Tall (Bahjat song) =

Single by Bahjat

from the album Bahjat (EP)
- Released: November 27, 2015
- Recorded: 2015
- Genre: Pop
- Length: 2:59
- Songwriter: Bahjat Alturjman
- Producers: Trevor Kissaun, Peter Borg, Bahjat Alturjman

Bahjat singles chronology
| "Stand Tall" (2015) | "Talk To Me" (2016) |

"Stand Tall" is the title of the debut single by Bahjat, taken from his eponymous debut EP, released in 2016. The song talks about appreciating the people one has in their life, and has a strong message of unity. With the song, a campaign on social media, dealing with discrimination, also took place under the same title of the song, with a video of different people talking about their experiences with discrimination leading the campaign. The song peaked at number seven on the Maltese Top 10.

== Music video ==
The song's music video was released on December 11, 2015, and it featured 100 people from different countries, singing and dancing along to the song, again sending a strong message of unity and celebrating differences. The video propelled the song to debut at number eight on the Bay Malta's Top 10.

== Chart performance ==
| Chart (2015) | Position |
|---|---|
| Malta's Top 10 | 7 |
