= A Real American Hero (film) =

- Genre: Crime; Drama
- Written by: Samuel A. Peeples
- Directed by: Lou Antonio
- Starring: Brian Dennehy; Forrest Tucker
- Theme music composer: Walter Scharf
- Country of origin: United States
- Original language: English

Production
- Executive producer: Charles A. Pratt
- Producer: Samuel A. Peeples
- Cinematography: Charles Correll
- Editor: Houseley Stevenson Jr.
- Running time: 90 minutes
- Production company: Bing Crosby Productions

Original release
- Network: CBS
- Release: December 9, 1978

A Real American Hero is an American television movie that aired on CBS on December 9, 1978. It runs 90 minutes. The film was directed by Lou Antonio and written by Samuel A. Peeples.

== Overview ==
The movie, which is set in 1967 and includes a disco reference, is about the real-life sheriff Buford Pusser, who goes after a criminal who has killed young people with his illegal moonshine. Brian Dennehy plays Pusser. The rest of the cast include Ken Howard, Sheree North, Forrest Tucker, and Brian Kerwin. The film was originally entitled "The Letter of the Law" (which appears in the closing credits) and was released on VHS as "Hard Stick".

== Cast ==
=== Main ===
- Brian Dennehy as Buford Pusser
- Forrest Tucker as Carl Pusser
- Brian Kerwin as Til Johnson
- Ken Howard as Danny Boy Mitchell
- Sheree North as Carrie Todd

=== Supporting ===
- Lane Bradbury as Debbie Pride
- Brad David as Mick Rodgers
- Ed Call as Grady Coker (credited as Edward Call)
- W.O. Smith as Obra Eaker
- Julie Thrasher as Dwana Pusser
- Jason Hood as Mike Pusser
- Ann Street as Grandma Pusser
- George Boyd as Lloyd Tatum
- Maureen Shannon as Amelia Biggins (credited as Maureen Burns)
- Charlie Briggs as Miles Conway
- Elizabeth Lane as Sabrina Marlowe
