= Dawn Lyn =

American former child actress (born 1963)

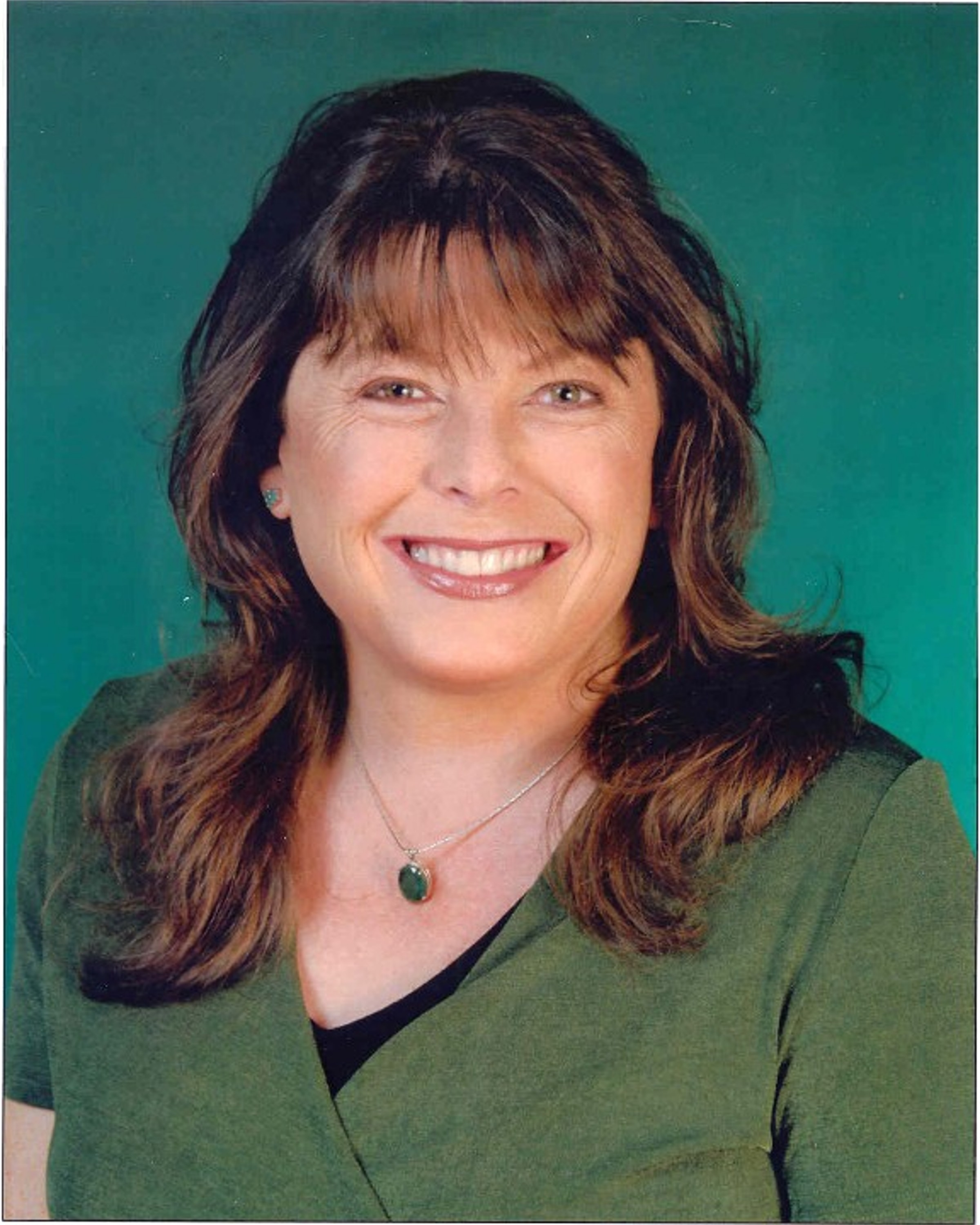
- Lyn in 2006
- Born: Dawn Lyn Nervik; January 11, 1963 (age 63); Los Angeles, California, U.S.
- Occupation: Actress
- Years active: 1967–1978
- Relatives: Leif Garrett (brother)

Dawn Lyn Nervik (born January 11, 1963) is an American former child actress who acted from ages 4 to 15. She is best known for her role as Dodie Douglas during the last three seasons of the sitcom My Three Sons.

== Personal life ==
Dawn Lyn Nervik was born in Los Angeles, California, to Carolyn Stellar and Rik Nervik. Her brother is singer and actor Leif Garrett.

Due to a hormonal deficiency Lyn remains small-of-stature and, as a child, looked younger than her actual age. Her adult height is 4 feet 10 inches.

On October 13, 2022, Lyn was hospitalized for five days for brain surgery to reduce a non-malignant tumor. On October 22, 2022, she fell into a coma caused by bacterial meningitis. Lyn was comatose in ICU for a month before regaining consciousness. As of March 25, 2024, she remains hospitalized, making gradual progress toward recovery. Her EEG indicates she can eventually make a full recovery. Her progress is monitored by her television brother from My Three Sons Stan Livingston and television sister-in-law from My Three Sons Tina Cole, with multiple visits by Cole.

== Career ==
=== Child actress ===
In 1969 Dawn Lyn was cast as Dodie Harper Douglas, the daughter of Steve Douglas' second wife, on the long-running family comedy television series My Three Sons. The show's storyline had Steve adopt Dodie, and Lyn remained with the series until it ended in 1972.

Later, Lyn worked on many popular series including Emergency! and Adam-12.

In 1971 Lyn had a role in the Gregory Peck western Shoot Out. She also appeared in the Walking Tall trilogy.

In 1973 she played Marcy McCloud, a child abducted by Comanches and sold to comancheros in two episodes of Gunsmoke. The episodes were called Women for Sale: Part 1 and 2.

She had a recurring role as Reagan in the 1974 NBC series Born Free. She also had a recurring role in the 1977 series The Red Hand Gang.

In 1974, Lyn appeared in the cult classic Devil Times Five, where Lyn's character Little Moe dumps a bucket of piranhas into a bathtub to kill the character Lovely, played by Lyn's mother, Carolyn Stellar. The same year, she appeared in the episode "Coinage of the Realm" on the series Harry O with David Janssen.

In a 1978 episode of Wonder Woman, Lyn played a teenage groupie to a pop idol played by her brother Leif Garrett (who also played the idol's twin brother).

=== Later career ===
While living in Avalon on Catalina Island, Lyn performed live voice acting with the Avalon Community Theater Radio Troupe from 1997 to 2006.
