= Walking Tall: Final Chapter =

1977 film by Jack Starrett

- Theatrical release poster
- Directed by: Jack Starrett
- Written by: Howard B. Kreitsek; Samuel A. Peeples
- Produced by: Charles A. Pratt
- Starring: Bo Svenson; Margaret Blye; Forrest Tucker; Morgan Woodward
- Cinematography: Robert B. Hauser
- Edited by: Houseley Stevenson, Jr.
- Music by: Walter Scharf
- Distributed by: American International Pictures
- Release date: June 17, 1977; (USA)
- Running time: 113 minutes
- Country: United States
- Language: English
- Box office: $6,350,000

Walking Tall: Final Chapter is the third installment of the Walking Tall film series. The film was directed by Jack Starrett. It opened in the U.S. on June 17, 1977; its on-screen title is Final Chapter: Walking Tall. All Walking Tall films were shot in Chester and Madison Counties, Tennessee; Buford Pusser was sheriff of McNairy County.

== Plot ==
One year has passed since the ambush that killed his wife, and Buford still has difficulty dealing with it. At his wife's grave, he breaks down, telling her he regrets ignoring her request not to become sheriff.

Buford visits the Tennessee Bureau of Investigation to find why John Witter is not in jail. They tell him they have no case against Witter. Pinky Dobson is paralyzed, and his girlfriend retracted her statement implicating Witter. Buford's friend, attorney Lloyd Tatum, tells Buford to be patient and let the TBI do their job. In New York City, Witter tells his boss that he will finally settle with Buford conclusively. The boss tells Witter he should accept that Pusser beat him and let it be at that. Because of Witter's mistakes, he is forced to cede 25% of his territory.

While Buford and Grady stake out a still run by O.Q. Teal and his brother Udell, Buford witnesses O.Q. beat his son Robby. Buford intervenes and beats O.Q. in the same manner. After blowing up the still, he takes Robby to an orphanage. At his office, Buford finds a message from Luan Paxton, a prostitute who helped Buford defeat the state line gang. When he meets her at her hotel, he is surprised when she tells him she now works in real estate. At home, Buford's father, Carl, tells him that he has incurred too many expenses as sheriff, and Buford says he will ask for a raise after re-election. Carl asks if he really wants to remain sheriff, and Buford says it is the only thing he knows how to do.

The next morning, O.Q.'s lawyer, French, demands he drop the charges against O.Q. to avoid police brutality charges; Buford refuses. Sheriff Clegg of Hardin County requests Buford investigate a new club, the 3 Deuces, in an unincorporated area. As Buford reluctantly agrees, three boys steal his car and go on a joyride. After Buford and Clegg catch them, Buford handcuffs them and forces them to clean the courthouse lawn. French objects, but Buford says the alternative would be much worse. A witness phones Witter, who realizes he can use this to throw the election. At the 3 Deuces bar, Buford is disappointed to see Luan is working as a prostitute. The owner sees her talk to Buford and tortures her. Angry that Witter has opened the bar without his consent, Witter's boss forces him to shut it down.

Buford and French are scheduled to debate, but Buford leaves when a body is found; Lloyd speaks on his behalf. When the body is revealed as Luan's, Buford storms into the 3 Deuces, orders everyone to leave, and burns it down. On election day, Carl tells Buford he has lost. Witter returns home elated. Buford tells his secretary he will apply for the highway patrol, and his parents worry about their finances. When the Teal brothers start a fight with Buford, the new sheriff warns Buford not to cause trouble. Overwhelmed, Buford visits his wife's grave, where his daughter, Dwana, reassures him everything will be all right.

Mel Bascum, a Hollywood producer, is inspired by news reports to sign a film deal. Though reluctant, Buford agrees. Witter is annoyed at the resulting publicity, but his boss orders him to leave it alone. Buford buys minibikes for his children, a car for himself, and plans to play himself in the next film. A thug from the 3 Deuces bar sees him after he meets with producers, and Buford's car subsequently loses control and crashes, killing him; Dwana arrives shortly afterward and cries. When Witter contacts his boss to discuss more business opportunities, the boss puts a hit on Witter.

== Cast ==
- Bo Svenson as Sheriff Buford Pusser
- Forrest Tucker as Grandpa Carl Pusser
- Lurene Tuttle as Grandma Helen Pusser
- Leif Garrett as Mike Pusser
- Dawn Lyn as Dwana Pusser
- Simpson Hemphill as Brownard
- Sandy McPeak as Lloyd Tatum
- Logan Ramsey as John Witter
- Morgan Woodward as The Boss
- Clay Tanner as O.Q. Teal
- Maggie Blye as Luan Paxton
- Bruce Glover as Deputy Grady Coker
- David Adams as Robbie Teal
- Michael Allen Honaker as Udell Teal
- Vance Davis as Aaron
- David W. Harper as Judd, driver of Sheriff's stolen car (uncredited)
- Libby Boone as Joan, Pusser's Secretary

== Production ==
Principal photography began on September 22, 1976 in Jackson, Tennessee, Henderson, Tennessee and surrounding areas, concluding on November 2. Post production began on November 8, 1976 at Paramount Studios in Hollywood, California.

== Reception ==
Vincent Canby of The New York Times called it "a thin, tired movie even when the screen is awash in blood".

John Simon called the film "old-fashioned unassuming garbage", but also said the one thing that made the movie watchable was Bo Svenson's performance as Pusser.
