= Walking Tall (1973 film) =

1973 biographical vigilante action drama film

- Theatrical release poster
- Directed by: Phil Karlson
- Written by: Mort Briskin; Stephen Downing (uncredited); John Michael Hayes (uncredited)
- Produced by: Mort Briskin
- Starring: Joe Don Baker; Elizabeth Hartman
- Cinematography: Jack A. Marta
- Edited by: Harry W. Gerstad
- Music by: Walter Scharf
- Production company: Bing Crosby Productions
- Distributed by: Cinerama Releasing Corporation
- Release date: February 22, 1973
- Running time: 125 minutes
- Country: United States
- Language: English
- Budget: $500,000
- Box office: $40 million

Walking Tall is a 1973 American neo-noir biographical vigilante action film directed by Phil Karlson. It is based on Buford Pusser's real-life story as a professional wrestler-turned-lawman in McNairy County, Tennessee. Joe Don Baker stars as Pusser.

The low-budget production was a massive financial success. Critical reviews were mixed to positive, describing Walking Tall as well-made and compelling despite a melodramatic story and budgetary shortcomings. It also became a cult film with two direct sequels of its own (Walking Tall Part 2 and Walking Tall: Final Chapter), a 1978 TV movie, a brief 1981 TV series and a 2004 remake that had its own two sequels.

== Plot ==
Buford Pusser, at his wife Pauline's behest, retires from the professional wrestling ring, and moves back to Tennessee to start a logging business with his father Carl Pusser. With a friend, Pusser visits a gambling and prostitution establishment, The Lucky Spot, and is beaten up after catching the house cheating at craps. Pusser is seriously injured with a knife and receives over 200 stitches. He complains to the sheriff, but is ignored, and soon becomes aware of the rampant corruption in McNairy County.

Later, working at his father's lumber mill, Pusser makes a club out of a tree branch. Late one night, Pusser waits until after The Lucky Spot is closed, and beats up the same thugs who left him for dead. The next day, Pusser is arrested; he represents himself at trial. At one point, he rips off his shirt and shows the jury his scars. He informs them, "If you let them do this to me and get away with it, then you're giving them the eternal right to do the same damn thing to any one of you!" The jury finds Pusser not guilty, and he decides to clean up the county, and runs for sheriff. The campaign against the incumbent sheriff is contentious, and he is killed trying to run Pusser off the road.

Pusser is elected, and becomes famous for being incorruptible and intolerant of crime, and for his array of four-foot hickory clubs, which he uses to great effect in dispatching criminals and destroying their clandestine gambling dens and illegal distilleries. Some residents praise Pusser as an honest cop in a crooked town; others denounce him as a bully willing to break some laws to uphold others. Pusser is betrayed by one of his deputies, and is attacked several times. Finally, Pauline and Pusser are ambushed in their car. Pauline is killed and Pusser is seriously injured.

Pusser is admitted to the hospital after being shot, and while still in a neck-and-face cast, attends his wife's funeral. Afterward, Pusser rams a sheriff cruiser through the front doors of The Lucky Spot, killing two of his would-be assassins. As Pusser leaves with two deputies, the townspeople arrive and begin throwing the gambling tables out into the parking lot. They light a bonfire as an overwhelmed Pusser wipes tears from his eyes.

== Cast ==
- Joe Don Baker as Sheriff Buford Pusser
- Elizabeth Hartman as Pauline Pusser
- Lurene Tuttle as Helen Pusser
- Noah Beery Jr. as Carl Pusser
- Dawn Lyn as Dwana Pusser
- Leif Garrett as Mike Pusser
- Felton Perry as Deputy Obra Eaker
- Logan Ramsey as John Witter
- Rosemary Murphy as Callie Hacker
- Gene Evans as Sheriff Al Thurman
- Bruce Glover as Deputy Grady Coker
- Kenneth Tobey as Augie McCullah
- Don Keefer as Dr. Lamar Stivers
- Douglas Fowley as Judge R. W. Clarke
- Pepper Martin as Zolan Dicks
- Ted Jordan as Deputy Virgil Button
- Red West as Sheriff Tanner
- Brenda Benet (credited as Brenda Benét) as Luan Paxton
- Arch Johnson as Buel Jaggers
- Sidney Clute as Sheldon Levine
- Russell Thorson as Ferrin Meaks
- Gil Perkins as 1st Bouncer
- Carey Loftin as Dice Player
- Warner Venetz as Stickman
- Ed Call as Lutie McVeigh
- Richard Donald as The Butler
- Gene LeBell as 2nd Bouncer
- Del Monroe as Otie Doss
- Richard X. Slattery as Arno Purdy

== Reception ==
=== Box office ===
Walking Tall was a box-office success. Produced on a budget of $500,000, the film grossed over $40 million, earning $10 million in theatrical rentals in the United States and Canada. The film played in rural areas before moving to larger cities, starting off slowly, but becoming a success through word-of-mouth.

=== Critical response ===
On Rotten Tomatoes, the film has an approval rating of 77% based on reviews from 13 critics. On Metacritic, it has a score of 60% based on reviews from seven critics.

Andrew Sarris of The Village Voice wrote: "Like it or not, Walking Tall is saying something very important to many people, and it is saying it with accomplished artistry". Vincent Canby of The New York Times wrote that, despite disliking the film, whose final scene he likened to "a nice KKK bonfire," he could "admire the manner in which it manipulates its audience through various notable clichés." Judith Crist of New York Magazine wrote: "Walking Tall grabs you where trash and violence invariably do, with excellent performers, shrewd plotting, and pacing". Keith Phipps of The A.V. Club, writing in 2002, describes the film as "an ultraviolent revenge fantasy" and "a masterpiece of over-the-top unintentional hilarity" and highly recommends the film, calling it an "unconscionably good time".

=== Accolades ===
The film is recognized by American Film Institute in these lists:

- 2003: AFI's 100 Years...100 Heroes & Villains
  - Buford Pusser – Nominated Hero

== Franchise ==
=== Sequels ===
The original Walking Tall was a hit, but the sequels, Walking Tall Part 2 (September 28, 1975), and Walking Tall: Final Chapter (August 10, 1977), both starring Bo Svenson, were far less profitable.

=== Television series ===
Also, a TV series Walking Tall (January 17 - June 6, 1981) also starred Svenson, and was a continuation of the original film.

=== Remake ===
On December 9, 1978, CBS aired a television movie titled A Real American Hero, starring Brian Dennehy as the title character. The film is set in 1967 and focused on real-life Sheriff Buford Pusser, who goes after a criminal who has killed young people with his illegal moonshine.

=== Second remake series ===
In 2004, a remake starring professional wrestler Dwayne "The Rock" Johnson was made. Although it used elements from Pusser's life and the original Walking Tall, many things were changed. Johnson's character's name was now Chris Vaughn, the sheriff is trying to stop the selling of illegal drugs instead of illegal moonshine, and the film's setting became semi-rural Kitsap County, Washington, although it was filmed in Squamish, British Columbia, Canada. Two sequels to the remake were produced, and released in 2007: Walking Tall: The Payback and Walking Tall: Lone Justice, both made in Dallas, Texas, and released directly to DVD. These sequels starred Kevin Sorbo as Nick Prescott, the son of the town's sheriff, who takes the law into his own hands when his father is killed in a suspicious car accident.

== In popular culture ==
In the song "The Movies" by the country music group The Statler Brothers which consists of naming different films, one line is "Thunderball, Walking Tall, Jaws, Jesse James".

The film is also the topic of the song "The Boys from Alabama" released by Drive-By Truckers off of their 2004 project The Dirty South.

Referenced in The Rules of Attraction.

== See also ==
- List of American films of 1973
- Vigilante film
