= Federal prosecution of public corruption in the United States =

Several statutes, mostly codified in Title 18 of the United States Code, provide for federal prosecution of public corruption in the United States. Federal prosecutions of public corruption under the Hobbs Act (enacted 1934), the mail and wire fraud statutes (enacted 1872), including the honest services fraud provision, the Travel Act (enacted 1961), and the Racketeer Influenced and Corrupt Organizations Act (RICO) (enacted 1970) began in the 1970s. "Although none of these statutes was enacted in order to prosecute official corruption, each has been interpreted to provide a means to do so." The federal official bribery and gratuity statute, 18 U.S.C. § 201 (enacted 1962), the Foreign Corrupt Practices Act (FCPA) 15 U.S.C. § 78dd (enacted 1977), and the federal program bribery statute, 18 U.S.C. § 666 (enacted 1984) directly address public corruption.

The statutes differ in their jurisdictional elements, the mens rea that they require (for example, a quid pro quo or a nexus), the species of official actions that are cognizable, whether or not non-public official defendants can be prosecuted, and in the authorized sentence. The statutes most often used to prosecute public corruption are the Hobbs Act, Travel Act, RICO, the program bribery statute, and mail and wire fraud statutes.

These statutes have been upheld as exercises of Congress's Commerce Clause power, or in the case of the mail fraud and program bribery statutes, the Postal Clause and the Spending Clause, respectively. In the special case where a member of Congress is the defendant, the Speech or Debate Clause places certain restrictions on the actions that can be prosecuted and proved up. Some commentators have argued that prosecutions of state and local officials under these statutes pose substantial federalism questions, while others argue that the Guarantee Clause provides additional authority for such prosecutions.

== History ==
Article Two, Section Four of the United States Constitution provides that: "The President, Vice President and all civil Officers of the United States, shall be removed from Office on Impeachment for, and Conviction of, Treason, Bribery, or other High crimes and Misdemeanors." For a time in the early history of the country, corrupt public officials could be charged with the common law crimes related to corruption; such crimes could continue to be charged in the D.C. circuit court, where the laws of Maryland and Virginia remained in force, even after the Supreme Court's decision abolishing federal common law crimes in United States v. Hudson (1812).

The First Congress passed the "first federal law against bribery" in 1789, which provided that bribed customs officers would be disqualified from office and payors would be liable for the amount of the bribe. The judicial bribery provision of the Crimes Act of 1790, passed the following year, provided for disqualification, and a fine and imprisonment "at the discretion of the court," for both the judge and the payor. The Crimes Act of 1825 added the offenses of extortion under color of office, theft or embezzlement by a Second Bank employee, and coin embezzlement or dilution by a Mint employee.

The mail fraud statute, 18 U.S.C. § 1341, "[t]he oldest statute used to address public corruption," was enacted in 1872 and first used against public corruption in the 1940s. While several early cases employed the "intangible right to honest government," United States v. States (8th Cir. 1973) was the first case to rely on honest services fraud as the sole basis for a conviction.

The prosecution of state and local political corruption became a "major federal law enforcement priority" in the 1970s. United States v. Addonizio (3d Cir. 1971) and United States v. Kenny (3d Cir. 1972)—both brought by U.S. Attorney for the District of New Jersey, Herbert Jay Stern (later a federal judge)—were the first prosecution of political corruption pursuant to the economic fear prong and the "under color of official right" prong of the Hobbs Act, respectively. Henderson describes these cases as the "New Jersey breakthroughs."

In 1976, the Public Integrity Section was established within United States Department of Justice Criminal Division with general supervisory jurisdiction over public corruption offenses. By 1977, "[t]he four United States attorney's offices most active in this field—the Southern District of New York, New Jersey, Maryland, and the Northern District of Illinois—" had "developed coteries of high skilled prosecutors and a tradition of success that encourages an atmosphere of alertness to potential corruption cases."

In 1977, Thomas H. Henderson, Jr., the Chief of the Public Integrity Section, wrote:

Until recently, the full panoply of potential federal resources had not been brought to bear effectively on corruption schemes at the state and local level. These schemes are at least as corrosive of the governmental process as corruption at the federal level. From the time of Tammany Hall this country has been painfully aware of the existence of corrupt practices in many of our metropolitan areas, and of the "machines" and "rings" which siphon off millions of dollars from public treasuries for private gain. Most state and local prosecutors, beset by inadequate resources and the overwhelming demands of a rising rate of street crime, are simply unable to deal with this type of corruption. Moreover, in some cases, local law enforcement is part and parcel of the problem itself, due to the outright corruption of its own establishment. To fill this enforcement role, federal prosecutors during the last decade began to assume a much more active and creative role in attempting to use federal statutes to attack corruption at the state and local level.

In 1976, there were 337 indictments of state and local officials for public corruption, compared to 63 in 1970. Between 1970 and 1981, there were 520 federal indictments of state officials, and 1,757 indictments of local officials, for public corruption; over that period, 369 state officials, and 1,290 local officials, were convicted. In 1986, there were 916 indictments of public officials for corruption, 320 of which concerned state and local officials. In 1990, there were 968 such indictments, 353 of which were against state and local officials.

The Foreign Corrupt Practices Act (FCPA), 15 U.S.C. § 78dd-1, was passed in 1977. The program bribery statute, 18 U.S.C. § 666, was passed in 1984. In the program bribery statute, "Congress, for the first time, directly federalized the crime of bribery of or by local officials."

For example, between 1985 and 1991, over 75 public officials were convicted of corruption offenses in the Southern District of West Virginia alone. By comparison, the only appellate court decision citing West Virginia's Bribery and Corrupt Practices Act, in 1991, was a federal court decision involving the state statute as a federal RICO predicate.

== Doctrinal overview ==
The legal elements and features of the major federal public corruption offenses differ. The various jurisdictional elements of the offenses require that the prosecution prove, alternatively: that the payee was a federal official; that the payee organization received $10,000 in federal funds; that the corrupt communications involved the use of the mail or interstate wires; that the corruption affected interstate commerce or interstate travel. The mens rea elements differ in whether they require a quid pro quo; a mere nexus is an easier element to prove; more difficult elements to prove include the intent to be influenced and inducement. The offenses also differ in whether the act to be procured from the public official must be an official, a violation of an official duty, a fraud on the United States, or an official transaction. The offenses also differ in whether the payor may be prosecuted in addition to the public official. Finally, the offenses differ in whether they are predicates for Racketeer Influenced and Corrupt Organizations Act and money laundering prosecutions, and in the maximum authorized prison sentence that may be imposed upon conviction.

	Federal bribery	Federal gratuity	Program bribery	Honest services mail and wire fraud	Hobbs Act (fear)	Hobbs Act (under color of official right)	Travel Act
Jurisdictional element	Federal officials	Federal officials	Federal funding exceeding $10,000	Mail or interstate wire communication	Interstate commerce	Interstate commerce	Interstate travel, mail, or interstate commerce
Mens rea	Quid pro quo (QPQ) and nexus	Nexus	Either (1) QPQ and intent to be influenced, or (2) nexus	Bribes or kickbacks	Intent hurt the victim in economic terms and victim fears	QPQ	QPQ
Species of quos	Future official act, fraud on the United States, or violation of duty	Past or future official act	Future official transaction exceeding $5,000	Official act or violation of duty	Any	Any	Any
Payor defendants	Yes	Yes	Yes	Yes	No	No	Yes, for bribery No, for extortion
Predicate status	RICO and ML	RICO and ML	ML	RICO and ML	RICO and ML	RICO and ML	RICO and ML
Authorized sentence (years)	15	2	10	20	20	20	5

== Federal officials ==
The federal bribery and gratuity statute, 18 U.S.C. § 201, was enacted in 1962 as part of a comprehensive conflict-of-interest legislative reform. The Supreme Court considers subsections (b) and (c) to be "two separate crimes—or two pairs of crimes."

In Dixson v. United States (1984), the Court held that, under the federal bribery and gratuity statute, the definition of a "public official" includes anyone in a "position of public trust with official federal responsibilities," including for example the employees of a non-profit that administers a federal block housing grant. The term "official act" is limited to acts which are performed within the scope of the official's employment. It is no defense that the official action was otherwise meritorious.

For both the bribery and gratuity subsections, the courts have interpreted an implicit exception for campaign contributions.

=== Bribery ===
The federal bribery statute, 18 U.S.C. § 201(b), criminalizes the corrupt promise or transfer of any thing of value to influence an official act of a federal official, a fraud on the United States, or the commission or omission of any act in violation of the official's duty. 18 U.S.C. § 201(b)(1)–(2) provides:

(b) Whoever –

(1) directly or indirectly, corruptly gives, offers or promises anything of value to any public official or person who has been selected to be a public official, or offers or promises any public official or any person who has been selected to be a public official to give anything of value to any other person or entity, with intent –

(A) to influence any official act; or
(B) to influence such public official or person who has been selected to be a public official to commit or aid in committing, or collude in, or allow, any fraud, or make opportunity for the commission of any fraud, on the United States; or
(C) to induce such public official or such person who has been selected to be a public official to do or omit to do any act in violation of the lawful duty of such official or person;

(2) being a public official or person selected to be a public official, directly or indirectly, corruptly demands, seeks, receives, accepts, or agrees to receive or accept anything of value personally or for any other person or entity, in return for:

(A) being influenced in the performance of any official act;
(B) being influenced to commit or aid in committing, or to collude in, or allow, any fraud, or make opportunity for the commission of any fraud, on the United States; or
(C) being induced to do or omit to do any act in violation of the official duty of such official or person . . .

shall be fined under this title or not more than three times the monetary equivalent of the thing of value, whichever is greater, or imprisoned for not more than fifteen years, or both, and may be disqualified from holding any office of honor, trust, or profit under the United States.

=== Gratuity ===
Text

The federal gratuity statute, 18 U.S.C. § 201(c), criminalizes the transfer of any thing of value to a federal official for or because of an official act. 18 U.S.C. § 201(c)(1) provides:

(c) Whoever –

(1) otherwise than as provided by law for the proper discharge of official duty –

(A) directly or indirectly gives, offers, or promises anything of value to any public official, former public official, or person selected to be a public official, for or because of any official act performed or to be performed by such public official, former public official, or person selected to be a public official; or
(B) being a public official, former public official, or person selected to be a public official, otherwise than as provided by law for the proper discharge of official duty, directly or indirectly demands, seeks, receives, accepts, or agrees to receive or accept anything of value personally for or because of any official act performed or to be performed by such official or person . . .

shall be fined under this title or imprisoned for not more than two years, or both.

Interpretation

In United States v. Sun-Diamond Growers of California (1999), the Supreme Court held that the gratuity statute required a nexus to an official act, but not a quid pro quo. Both past and future official acts are cognizable, but not payments for status, access, generalized goodwill, or unspecified acts. Sun-Diamond defined the nexus as follows: "We hold that, in order to establish a violation of 18 U.S.C. § 201(c)(1)(A), the Government must prove a link between a thing of value conferred upon a public official and a specific 'official act' for or because of which it was given."

== Program bribery ==
The program bribery statute, 18 U.S.C. § 666, was enacted in 1984. Previous prohibitions required the specific funds to have been under federal control (18 U.S.C. § 641) or the involvement of federal employees (18 U.S.C. § 201).

Text

The program bribery statute, 18 U.S.C. § 666, criminalizes the corrupt offer of anything of value intending to influence an agent in connection with a transaction exceeding $5,000, and involving a government or organization receiving at least $10,000 in federal funds. 18 U.S.C. § 666(a)–(c) provides:

(a) Whoever, if the circumstance described in subsection (b) of this section exists –

(1) being an agent of an organization, or of a State, local, or Indian tribal government, or any agency thereof . . .

(B) corruptly solicits or demands for the benefit of any person, or accepts or agrees to accept, anything of value from any person, intending to be influenced or rewarded in connection with any business, transaction, or series of transactions of such organization, government, or agency involving any thing of value of $5,000 or more; or

(2) corruptly gives, offers, or agrees to give anything of value to any person, with intent to influence or reward an agent of an organization or of a State, local or Indian tribal government, or any agency thereof, in connection with any business, transaction, or series of transactions of such organization, government, or agency involving anything of value of $5,000 or more;

shall be fined under this title, imprisoned not more than 10 years, or both.
(b) The circumstance referred to in subsection (a) of this section is that the organization, government, or agency receives, in any one year period, benefits in excess of $10,000 under a Federal program involving a grant, contract, subsidy, loan, guarantee, insurance, or other form of Federal assistance.
(c) This section does not apply to bona fide salary, wages, fees, or other compensation paid, or expenses paid or reimbursed, in the usual course of business.

Interpretation

In Fischer v. United States (2000), the Court held that the jurisdictional requirement of $10,000 in federal funds can be satisfied by any funds that flow through the organization, for example Medicaid reimbursements which a hospital receives indirectly through the patients. The only requirement is that the funds be traced to a statutory appropriation, and that their receipt be in furtherance of a federal policy.

Despite academic suggestions to the contrary, in Salinas v. United States (1997), the Supreme Court held that the transaction itself need not involve federal funds. The $5,000 transactional amount may be satisfied by the value of intangible goods or services.

§ 666 does not apply to the corrupt solicitation of political services in exchange for a municipal job.

Both § 666(a)(1)(B) and § 666(a)(2) contain both an "intent to influence" and an "intent to reward" prong. Under "intent to influence" prong, both a quid pro quo and an actual intent to influence/be influenced are required. Under the "intent to reward" prong, the majority of circuits permit prosecutions for mere gratuities, but some do not.

Because "organization" is defined as non-governmental and "local government" is defined as a subdivision of a state, public officials of federal territories cannot be prosecuted under § 666. Members of tribal governments may be prosecuted.

== Foreign Corrupt Practices Act ==
The Foreign Corrupt Practices Act, 15 U.S.C. § 78dd-1, criminalizes the corrupt offer, by mail or in commerce, of anything of value from a publicly traded company to a foreign official for an official act to do business.

== Mail and wire fraud ==
=== Obtaining money or property ===
Text

The federal mail fraud, 18 U.S.C. § 1341, and federal wire fraud, 18 U.S.C. § 1343, statutes criminalize any scheme or artifice to obtain money or property by fraud in connection with a mail or wire communication, respectively. The mail fraud statute, § 1341 provides, in relevant part:

Whoever, having devised or intending to devise any scheme or artifice to defraud, or for obtaining money or property by means of false or fraudulent pretenses, representations, or promises, or to sell, dispose of, loan, exchange, alter, give away, distribute, supply . . . for the purpose of executing such scheme or artifice or attempting so to do, places in any post office or authorized depository for mail matter, any matter or thing whatever to be sent or delivered by the Postal Service, or deposits or causes to be deposited any matter or thing whatever to be sent or delivered by any private or commercial interstate carrier, or takes or receives therefrom, any such matter or thing, or knowingly causes to be delivered by mail or such carrier according to the direction thereon, or at the place at which it is directed to be delivered by the person to whom it is addressed, any such matter or thing, shall be fined under this title or imprisoned not more than 20 years, or both.

The wire fraud statute, § 1343 provides, in relevant part:

Whoever, having devised or intending to devise any scheme or artifice to defraud, or for obtaining money or property by means of false or fraudulent pretenses, representations, or promises, transmits or causes to be transmitted by means of wire, radio, or television communication in interstate or foreign commerce, any writings, signs, signals, pictures, or sounds for the purpose of executing such scheme or artifice, shall be fined under this title or imprisoned not more than 20 years, or both.

Interpretation

The mail and wire fraud statutes may be used to prosecute public corruption by both elected and appointed public officials, political party officials, candidates for party offices, members of tribal governments, and others, including foreign public officials.

"The major problems faced by federal prosecutors in applying [the mail and wire fraud statutes] to political schemes is establishing that the defendant intentionally attempted to defraud the victims of something of value within the meaning of the States." The salary and benefits of an elected public employee are not "property" for the purposes of the mail and wire fraud statutes, but the salary and benefits of an unelected public employee are. One intangible form of property recognized under the mail and wire fraud statutes is the right to control the disposition of government funds.

In 1983, Curato et al. noted that:

[F]ederal courts and prosecutors are now realizing the potential uses for the mail fraud statute in combating political corruption. The relative ease of proving mail fraud violations and the apparent increase in corrupt political activities have caused more political officials to face mail fraud prosecutions. The recent successful prosecution of a non-elected political official foreshadows the continuing evolution of the mail fraud act as one of the public's protectors against bribery and extortion committed by government personnel.

=== Honest services fraud ===
At least from the 1970s, and perhaps earlier, the federal appellate courts permitted mail fraud prosecutions of public officials deprive the public of their intangible right to honest services. According to Professor John C. Coffee, "[t]he mid 1970s saw the flowering of the 'intangible rights doctrine,' an exotic flower that quickly overgrew the legal landscape in the manner of the kudzu vine until by the mid-1980s few ethical or fiduciary breaches seemed beyond its potential reach." In McNally v. United States (1987), the Supreme Court held that a "scheme or artifice to defraud" under the mail and wire fraud statutes did not include a scheme or artifice to defraud another of the intangible right to honest services. In 1988, Congress responded by adding 18 U.S.C. § 1346 which provides:

For the purposes of this chapter, the term "scheme or artifice to defraud" includes a scheme or artifice to deprive another of the intangible right of honest services.

§ 1346 was known as the "McNally fix." In Skilling v. United States (2010), the Court construed § 1346 to apply only to bribes and kickbacks. Post-Skilling is it unclear whether a mere gratuity can be prosecuted as a "kickback." Skilling adopted the definition of "kickback" used in 41 U.S.C. § 52(2):

"[K]ickback" means any money, fee, commission, credit, gift, gratuity, thing of value, or compensation of any kind which is provided, directly or indirectly, to any prime contractor, prime contractor employee, subcontractor, or subcontractor employee for the purpose of improperly obtaining or rewarding favorable treatment in connection with a prime contract or in connection with a subcontract relating to a prime contract.

Post-Skilling, some courts have held that gratuities may be reached as kickbacks, while others have held that they may not. Prof. Coffee has argued that honest services fraud doctrine should explicitly distinguish between public and private corruption.

== Hobbs Act ==
The Hobbs Act, 18 U.S.C. § 1951, provides, in relevant part:

(a) Whoever in any way or degree obstructs, delays, or affects commerce or the movement of any article or commodity in commerce, by . . . extortion or attempts or conspires so to do . . . shall be fined under this title or imprisoned not more than twenty years, or both.
(b) As used in this section . . .

(2) The term "extortion" means the obtaining of property from another, with his consent, induced by wrongful use of actual or threatened . . . fear, or under color of official right.

The Hobbs Act's definition of "extortion" was "copied from the New York Code substantially." The New York extortion law provided: "Extortion is the obtaining of property from another, or the obtaining the property of a corporation from an officer, agent, or employee thereof, with his consent, induced by a wrongful use of force or fear, or under color of official right." Blackstone described extortion as "an abuse of public justice, which consists of an officer's unlawfully taking, by colour of his office, from any man, any money or thing of value that is not due to him, or more than is due, or before it is due."

=== Fear ===
The Hobbs Act criminalizes, inter alia, the obtaining of property with consent by actual or threatened fear, if interstate commerce is affected. The economic fear prong of the Hobbs Act may be used to prosecute political corruption, as long as there is an affirmative act of inducement; but only the payees (bribe-takers), and not the payors may be reached (the latter have a defense of duress). Under the economic fear prong, "[t]he absence or presence of fear of economic loss must be considered from the perspective of the victim, not the extortionist; the proof need establish that the victim reasonably believed: first, that the defendant had the power to harm the victim, and second, that the defendant would exploit that power to the victim's detriment."

=== Under color of official right ===
The Hobbs Act also criminalizes the obtaining of property under color of official right, if interstate commerce is affected. In a law review article published while the appeal in Kenny was pending, Stern wrote:

At a time when the institutions of government, both local and federal, are being subjected to increasing attack and cynicism, those responsible of the enforcement of the law and the administration of justice cannot afford to allow one of the most powerful means of combatting official corruption to be emasculated by unwarranted, restrictive interpretation. The distinction between bribery and extortion that has developed under the Hobbs Act is unnecessary when that Act is used to prosecute corruption in public office. The phrase "under color of official right" which appears in the Act's definition of extortion renders that distinction moot.

In 1971, Stern wrote that the Hobbs Act was "one of the major statutes under which the federal government can combat local political corruption where the state is either unable or unwilling to do so," citing the Travel Act as the "other major statute." In 1977, Charles Ruff wrote that the Hobbs Act "has become the principal vehicle for this rapidly expanding federal effort." Ruff describes Stern's article as "[t]he only detailed analysis of the problem before the recent flood of cases." By 1977, the Third Circuit's interpretation in Kenny had been adopted by the First, Second, Fourth, Seventh, Eighth, and Tenth Circuits. The Fifth, Sixth, and Ninth Circuits followed suit by 1986. Some commentators have argued that the Hobbs Act should not be interpreted to reach public corruption at all.

In McCormick v. United States (1991), the Supreme Court held that the "under color of official right" prong of the Hobbs Act could be used to prosecute political corruption as long as there was a quid pro quo. Prior to McCormick, there was a circuit split on this question. The next year, in Evans v. United States (1992), the Court held that no affirmative act of inducement is required on the part of the public official. Prior to Evans, there was also a circuit split on this question. Nor is a nexus required; nor is the quo required to be within the de jure power of the public official, as opposed to access, generalized goodwill, or unspecific acts.

Payors may not be prosecuted under the "under color of official right" prong, but have no duress defense under other statutes. Successful candidate for public office may be prosecuted for their pre-election actions, but unsuccessful candidates may not.

== Travel Act ==
The Travel Act, 18 U.S.C. § 1952, criminalizes, inter alia, the use of interstate travel or the mail to distribute the proceeds of, or promote or manage, unlawful activity, including extortion or bribery. The Travel Act has been used to prosecute political corruption. For example, the Travel Act may be used to prosecute public officials for extortion and bribery in violation of state law, as the Supreme Court held in United States v. Nardello (1969). According to Curato et al.:

From passage in 1961 until approximately 1971, political officials were not prosecuted under the Travel Act. Since then, however, prosecutors and courts alike have found the Travel Act to be another valuable weapon in their continuing battle against the debilitating effects of political corruption.

== As a predicate ==
=== RICO ===
"In the 1970s, federal prosecutors began to argue that RICO was applicable to corrupt state and local government bodies." With the exception of program bribery, all of the aforementioned offenses are predicates for liability under the Racketeer Influenced and Corrupt Organizations Act (RICO). A state or local governmental unit may be named as part of the charged RICO "enterprise." As Henderson wrote in 1977, "if a governmental unit can be classified as an enterprise within the meaning of the statute, it could have great impact on the ability of prosecutors to reach political crimes."

=== Money laundering ===
All RICO predicates are also money laundering predicates. Federal program bribery, while not a RICO predicate, is a money laundering predicate.

== Other statutes ==
Chapter 11 - Bribery, Graft, and Conflicts of Interest

- 18 U.S.C. § 203: unauthorized compensation of officials for representing persons before the government (formerly codified at Rev. Stat. § 1782) (enacted 1864)
- 18 U.S.C. § 204: prohibiting members of Congress from practicing before the United States Court of Claims or the Federal Circuit
- 18 U.S.C. § 205: officials prosecuting claims against or before the United States (enacted 1962)
- 18 U.S.C. § 207: "revolving door" statute (enacted 1962)
- 18 U.S.C. § 208: executive branch conflict of interest (enacted 1962)
- 18 U.S.C. § 209: executive branch salary supplementation (enacted 1962)
- 18 U.S.C. § 211: sale of appointive office (formerly codified at 18 U.S.C. § 150, and then 18 U.S.C. § 215) (enacted 1926)

Other

- 18 U.S.C. § 371: conspiracy to defraud the United States (formerly codified at Rev. Stat. § 5440, and then 18 U.S.C. § 88) (enacted 1867)
- 18 U.S.C. § 610: coercion of political activity
- 18 U.S.C. § 872: extortion under color of office (enacted 1825)

== Constitutional issues ==
=== Enumerated powers ===
The Hobbs Act, the Travel Act, and the Racketeer Influenced and Corrupt Organizations Act (RICO) have been upheld under the Commerce Clause. The mail fraud statute has been justified under the Postal Clause. In Sabri v. United States (2004), the Supreme Court upheld the constitutionality of the program bribery statute, 18 U.S.C. § 666, under the Spending Clause (with Justice Clarence Thomas citing the Commerce Clause in concurrence). Prior to Sabri, several circuit courts had already so held.

Professor Adam Kurland has proposed the Guarantee Clause of Article Four of the United States Constitution—which provides that "[t]he United States shall guarantee to every State in the Union a Republican Form of Government"—as a constitutional basis for corruption statutes as applied to state and local officials. Professor John C. Coffee argues that "there is a more modest role for the Guarantee Clause" in distinguishing between public and private corruption under the same statutes.

=== Speech or Debate Clause ===
The Speech or Debate Clause of Article One of the United States Constitution provides that: "[F]or any Speech or Debate in either House, [Senators or Representatives] shall not be questioned in any other Place." United States v. Johnson (1966) was the first case in which the Supreme Court held that the Clause barred a corruption prosecution. Specifically, the Court held that a floor speech by a Congressperson could not be admitted as evidence in a prosecution under 18 U.S.C. § 281 (the federal conflict-of-interest statute) or § 371 (conspiracy to defraud the United States) to show the motivation for the introduction of a private bill. Representative Thomas Francis Johnson had agreed to make a speech in the House and intercede with the Department of Justice on behalf of a savings and loan association in exchange for a campaign contribution and legal fees.

The Court has twice considered the role of the Clause in the prosecution of federal members of Congress for bribery under § 201. In United States v. Brewster (1972), the Court held that a § 201 prosecution of a Congressperson does not violate the Clause so long as "no inquiry into legislative acts or motivation for legislative acts is necessary for the Government to make out a prima facie case." Brewster reinstated a dismissed § 201 indictment because the crime of bribery is complete once the bribe is accepted, whether or not the official performs the promised act. In United States v. Helstoski (1979), the Court held that the prosecution may not introduce any evidence of a past "legislative act" at trial. According to Weeks, "[a]s a practical matter, it is extremely difficult to successfully prosecute a section 201 action if reference to a defendant's legislative acts is forbidden."

=== Federalism ===
Charles Ruff referred to "the prosecution of local officials for acts of public corruption" as "perhaps the most sensitive area of federal-state cooperation." Several other commentators have expressed federalism concerns about such prosecutions. Others have disagreed. But, as Whitaker notes, "Congress and the courts have not raised potential federalism concerns and, in fact, appear to approve of increased use of federal law to prosecute low-level bribery at the state and local levels." According to Professor John C. Coffee, "[a]lthough this prophesy that the Supreme Court will curb the federal fraud statutes may yet prove accurate, that is not the direction in which the lower federal courts have been moving."

In United States v. Gillock (1980), a prosecution under the Hobbs Act and Travel Act, the Supreme Court declined to recognize a legislative act privilege for state legislators analogous in scope to the Speech or Debate Clause, either under the Tenth Amendment or Federal Rule of Evidence 501. Gillock argued that "recognition of an evidentiary privilege for state legislators for their legislative acts would impair the legitimate interest of the Federal Government in enforcing its criminal statutes with only speculative benefit to the state legislative process." Similarly, the courts have consistently rejected claims by convicted state legislators that their prosecutions violate the Tenth Amendment.
