= Cowboy Mafia =

Marijuana smugglers, Dallas, 1970s

The Cowboy mafia was the nickname for a group of marijuana smugglers who operated in the United States during the 1970s. At the time they were reportedly the most prolific drug smugglers in Texas. The nickname was given to the group by the Dallas media, as the capture and trial of the group created significant media coverage throughout Texas.

During 1977 and 1978 the group imported over 106 tons of marijuana. Using the shrimp boats Agnes Pauline, Monkey, Jubilee, and Bayou Blues, the group made six trips from Colombia to Texas. On each of the 6 shrimp boats involved in the travel of marijuana, there was anywhere between 35,000 and 40,000 pounds of marijuana that was then transported to ranches owned by Rex Cauble dispersed throughout the state. The group was arrested in 1978 after the federal government seized the Agnes Pauline when they were unloading their cargo in Port Arthur, Texas.

== Trial and conviction ==
In 1979, 26 members of the smuggling ring were convicted. A noteworthy judge of the trials, Joe Fisher, overturned 4 of the 6 smugglers convicted in the case in September 1981. This became controversial as he then attempted to reduce the publicity of the case by not allowing reporters to be present during certain phases of the trial. Later in January 1982, one of the defendants that had their conviction overturned pleaded guilty to intent of distribution with possession of marijuana. He agreed to testify in the other trials of the case in exchange for a lesser charge.

The last fugitive known of the Cowboy Mafia was found in Fort Lauderdale in a motel after being tipped off. Believed to be Frank Bryant, he was off the radar since July 10, 1979 when 21 suspects were indicted of the operation. He was found in November 1981. Not only did Bryant have a federal warrant nationwide, but he also had marijuana charges on him in Georgia at the time. Frank Bryant was in 3 of the 26 counts indicted that were issued in Texas, one of them being conspiring an operation to smuggle marijuana to the United States. That count alone presented with 20 years in prison at maximum and/or a fine of 25,000 dollars.

Rex Cauble, who was considered the headman of the operation was sentenced to a maximum of 95 years and was in risk of losing a third of his holdings, which were estimated to be 55 to 80 million dollars. In August 1981, Rex Cauble was indicted by a grand jury, as the government believed he was the financial backer of the smugglers. Foster was the foreman for his ranches and the drugs were transported to Cauble's ranches throughout Texas. Cauble was a multi-millionaire, the former chairman of the Texas Aeronautics Commission and an honorary Texas Ranger. He was also the owner of Cutter Bill, a famous cutting horse.

Cauble was convicted in January 1982 within US District Judge William M. Steger court in Tyler, Texas on ten counts including: two counts of violating the Racketeer Influenced and Corrupt Organizations Act statute (RICO), conspiracy to violate RICO, three violations of the Interstate Commerce Travel Act, and four counts of misapplication of bank funds. The following month, Cauble was found guilty of smuggling 106 tons of marijuana. He was sentenced to ten concurrent terms of five-years. He was released due to completing his time and having good conduct in September 1987, which then he remarried in 1994. Cauble died in 2003 due to natural causes at the age of 89.

As a result of the RICO conviction, Cauble forfeited his 31% interest in Cauble Enterprises. This included interests in: two Cutter Bill Western World stores, three Texas banks (Western State Bank in Denton, Dallas International Bank and South Main Bank of Houston), six ranches, a welding supply company, and oil and gas holdings. The company's worth was estimated at $80 million. However, the government sold their interest back to the other partners (Cauble's wife and son) for an estimated $12 million. In the Fall of 2017, a pseudo-semi-nonfiction book written by Barker Milford titled "Catching the Katy" was released through Dorrance Publishing that depicted additional accounts of The Cowboy Mafia.

== See also ==
- Dixie Mafia
- Dallas crime family
- Cornbread mafia
