= Johnny Boone =

American marijuana farmer (1943/1944–2024)

- Born: John Robert Boone; September 22, 1943; Springfield, Kentucky, U.S.
- Died: June 14, 2024 (aged 80); Lebanon, Kentucky, U.S.
- Spouse: Marilyn Fenwick
- Children: 5

John Robert Boone (September 22, 1943 – June 14, 2024) was an American farmer who was the leader of the Cornbread Mafia in the 1980s, one of the largest domestic marijuana syndicates in American history. He has been referred to as the "Godfather of Grass".

== Biography ==
Boone was born in Washington County, Kentucky on September 22, 1943. He was raised by his grandfather who was a farmer and bootlegger during the Prohibition era. Boone won state 4-H titles in high school for both sheep breeding and tobacco growing. He was a three-time football letterman and graduated in 1961. He did not go to college and instead started a family and became a farmer. By the 1970s, he was cultivating what was said to be the best breed of pot in Kentucky, labeled "Kentucky Bluegrass" by High Times.

In the 1980s, Boone was a leader in the Cornbread Mafia, a drug organization in Kentucky dubbed the "largest domestic marijuana syndicate in American history". During his time in the organization, he helped set up marijuana farms in his home state of Kentucky as well as surrounding states in the Midwest including Indiana, Illinois, and Kansas. He was arrested in 1987 as the ringleader of the organization and sentenced to 20 years in prison.

In June 2008, police discovered Boone growing 2,421 marijuana seedlings on his farm outside Springfield, Kentucky, in Washington County, but he escaped arrest, under threat of a life sentence without parole because the bust would be his third federal conviction under the Three Strikes Law. He became a fugitive and the subject of a segment of America's Most Wanted. On December 22, 2016, after eight years on the run, he was arrested in a small town outside Montreal, Quebec, Canada. He was sentenced to 57 months in prison, but was released from the Federal Correctional Institution, Elkton in June 2020 due to a COVID-19 outbreak.

Boone died in Lebanon, Kentucky on June 14, 2024, at the age of 80.

== Legacy ==
Boone admitted to his wrongdoings: "We’re from a poor place … I don't think anybody here is into any kind of thievery. I can only say that … in our area, marijuana is one of the things that helps put bread on the table for people." He was also known as being humble and taking care of his community in Marion and Washington Counties, Kentucky. During an eight-year period when he was on the run, U.S. Marshals were unable to get information from people on his whereabouts, being told by residents they would not tell his location even if they knew.
