= Rex Cauble =

Texas millionaire, cutting horse breeder and rancher

- Rex Cauble, 1967
- Birth name: Rex Carmack Cauble
- Occupation: Banking, ranching, construction, real estate
- Discipline: NCHA cutting
- Born: August 15, 1913; Vaughan, Texas
- Died: June 23, 2003; Durant, Oklahoma
- Resting place: Sparkman Hillcrest Memorial Park, Dallas, TX
- Major wins/Championships: 1964 NCHA Non-Pro World Champion
- Lifetime achievements: Honorary Texas Ranger; 1978 American Medical Center Research Center Humanitarian Award,

Significant horses
- Cutter Bill

Rex Cauble (August 15, 1913—June 23, 2003) was born in Vaughan, Texas, to cotton farmers, Lou Butts and Fred C. "Buddy" Cauble. He was a millionaire businessman who became wealthy as a wildcatter. In the 1970s, he founded two high-end retail, western-wear stores comprising Cutter Bill Western World named after Cauble's world-champion cutting horse, Cutter Bill; one store was located in Houston, the other in Dallas.

At age 67, Cauble became infamous when he was indicted under suspicion that he was bankrolling what was "reportedly the largest marijuana-smuggling operation in Texas during the '70s." A U.S. Attorney "labeled the dapper 67-year-old Denton, Texas, millionaire a 'general' in the 'Cowboy Mafia' of drug smugglers". Members of the Cowboy Mafia were "caught in the seizure of a shrimp boat carrying 22 tons of high-grade Colombian marijuana to Port Arthur, Texas." Many people who knew Cauble believed his ranch foreman Charles "Muscles" Foster had deceived Cauble and was the real leader of the smuggling operation.

Cauble was indicted on a total of 10 counts, including three violations of the Racketeer Influenced and Corrupt Organizations statute (RICO), three violations of the Travel Act, and four counts of misapplication of bank funds. In 1982, the jury convicted him on all counts. The trial judge sentenced Cauble to serve concurrent five-year sentences for each count and ordered forfeiture of his share in Cauble Enterprises. After serving five years, Cauble was released from prison based on a combination of time served and good conduct. Cauble pleaded innocent to the charges and maintained his innocence until the day he died.

== Early life ==
Rex Cauble grew up on his parents' cotton farm in Vaughan, Texas. As a young boy, he had his own horse, but not one he bred and raised on his own, an aspiration that followed him into adulthood. In the 1930s, Cauble worked as an oilfield roughneck and wildcatter, which developed into a lucrative business that eventually made him a multimillionaire.

Rex married Josephine Hughes Sterling in 1952, and adopted her young son Lewis Rex Cauble.

By the 1960s, Cauble owned several ranches, where he stood the legendary Quarter Horse stallions Wimpy P-1, Silver King P-183, Hard Twist P-555 and Cutter Bill. During that time, Cauble first met Charles "Muscles" Foster, a professional rodeo cowboy, but a very troubled man whom Cauble took under his wing.
