= Cornbread Mafia =

American criminal group of marijuana producers

The "Cornbread mafia" was the name for a group of Kentucky men who created the largest domestic marijuana production operation in United States history. It was based in Marion, Nelson and Washington counties in central Kentucky. The term "Cornbread Mafia" was first publicly used by federal prosecutors in a June 1989 press conference, where they revealed that 70 men had been arrested for organizing a marijuana trafficking ring that stretched across 30 farms in 10 states stretching from the Southeast into the Midwest. The story was first reported in the Courier Journal newspaper in Louisville, Kentucky on October 8, 1989, and then in 2012 in the narrative non-fiction book The Cornbread Mafia: A Homegrown Syndicate's Code of Silence and the Biggest Marijuana Bust in American History by James Higdon.

In his first two books,The Origins of the Cornbread Mafia, a Memoir of Sorts (2016) and Cornbread Mafia, The Outlaws of Central Kentucky (2018) author and founding member Joe Keith Bickett, chronicles his first-hand account as to how the term "Cornbread Mafia" was coined in Kentucky in the late 1970s. and the group's ultimate downfall in the late 1980s.

Bickett wrote his first two memoirs "The Origins of the Cornbread Mafia, A Memoir of Sorts" and "Cornbread Mafia, The Outlaws of Central Kentucky" while incarcerated in the 1990s but did not publish his books until several years after his release from federal prison in 2011.

== Origin of the name ==
Higdon's book reports that assistant US Attorney Cleve Gambill said at the June 1989 press conference: "The organization is a highly motivated, well financed group of marijuana growers from Kentucky who are responsible for growing this vast amount of marijuana [and who] call themselves the Cornbread Mafia." Prosecutors held this press conference to lay out their case against the "Cornbread Mafia" because of the 70 men arrested in association with it, none of them cooperated with authorities, which thwarted a Continuing Criminal Enterprise case against the suspected ringleaders. Internal documents describe the proposed CCE prosecution as "futile" because of the group's collective silence. This code of silence persisted until Higdon published his book, The Cornbread Mafia, in 2012.

Joe Keith Bickett was released from prison in 2011 after serving approximately 22 years of his 25-year sentence. In 2016, Bickett self-published a first-hand account in his 2016 memoir titled The Origins of the Cornbread Mafia: A Memoir of Sorts, in which he provides a first-hand account how the term "Cornbread Mafia" was actually coined in September 1978.

== Original members Joe Keith Bickett and others ==
The original and founding members of the Cornbread Mafia were author Joe Keith Bickett, Jimmy Bickett, Jimmy Downs (aka "Ray") and Garland Russell. Bobby Joe Shewmaker, a Vietnam veteran, Johnny Boone and others would join the clandestine operation in the early 1980s. The group initially operated out of Squire's Tavern in the small town of Raywick located in central Kentucky before the group spread throughout a multi-state area.

== Allegations ==
Between 1985 and 1989, 70 Kentuckians were accused of growing 182 tons of marijuana on 29 farms in 10 states, including Minnesota, Illinois, Indiana, Tennessee, Michigan, Nebraska, Missouri and Kansas, which federal prosecutors considered to be the "largest domestic marijuana producing organization in the nation." By the end of 1991, prosecutors had arrested more than 100 members of the Cornbread Mafia, mostly from Lebanon, Kentucky.

According to Joe Keith Bickett's second book, Bobby Joe "Redeye" Shewmaker, the leader of the Kansas crew, was the only defendant in the group's history to be indicted on a CCE charge (Career Criminal Enterprise). Jimmy Bickett and author Joe Keith Bickett, along with two codefendants, were the only defendants who proceeded to a jury trial after being indicted in March 1989 in federal court in Louisville, Kentucky on distribution of marijuana charges.

== Prison time ==
In October 2022, author Joe Keith Bickett self-published his third book titled Cornbread Mafia, the Quest for Freedom, a Prisoner's Memoir. ISBN 9798437725108 In his third memoir, Bickett dives deep into the murky world of federal prison as Bickett and many members of the Cornbread Mafia strive for their freedom after being convicted in various federal courts across the country as marijuana offenders. Bickett was sentenced to 25 years. Jimmy Bickett, Johnny Boone, "The Godfather of Grass" and Tommy Lee were each sentenced to 20 years. Bobby Joe Shewmaker was sentenced to 30 years. Many more members were sentenced to serve lesser terms and in some cases longer Terms. Some are still incarcerated. In this third memoir, Bickett details an unforgiving and sometimes corrupt justice system while incarcerated for years in "the Belly of the Beast".

== Johnny Boone ==
The most notable member of the Cornbread Mafia was Johnny Boone, arrested in 1987 as the ringleader of a marijuana operation in Minnesota, for which he served about 15 years in prison. In June 2008, police discovered Boone growing 2,421 marijuana seedlings on his farm outside Springfield, Kentucky in Washington County, but Boone escaped arrest, under threat of a life sentence without parole because the bust would be his third federal conviction under the Three Strikes Law. Boone became a fugitive and the subject of a segment of America's Most Wanted.

On Dec. 22, 2016, after eight years on the run, Johnny Boone was arrested in a small town outside Montreal, where he had been tracked by the U.S. Marshals Service. He was brought to the United States in April 2017. On December 19, 2017, Boone pled guilty to one count of a superseding information. Boone was represented by attorneys C. Thomas Hectus, Henry Stephens and Elmer J. George. Author, Joe Keith Bickett was employed as law clerk/paralegal for Mr. George and worked as a legal aide for the attorneys on the Johnny Boone case. Contrary to the life sentences he was facing, Boone was sentenced to 57 months by Chief District Court Judge Charles Simpson III, the same judge who sentenced the Bickett brothers, Jimmy and Joe Keith, in 1990.

Boone was sentenced to serve his time at FCI Elkton, a low security federal prison in Ohio. In the midst of the COVID-19 pandemic, the Elkton prison became notorious for being overrun with the disease. Due to health risks, Boone's attorneys requested in May 2020 he be released; which was granted on June 3. Boone died on June 14, 2024, at the age of 80.

== Obama clemency ==
President Barack Obama granted clemency to three men from Marion County, Kentucky; all were either directly or indirectly connected to the Cornbread Mafia.

In November 2011, President Obama granted a pardon to Les Berry, an original member of the alleged "Cornbread Mafia," who was caught in Wisconsin driving a get-away car with six other Kentucky men fleeing a marijuana farm in Minnesota in late October 1987.

In March 2015, President Obama commuted the prison sentences of 22 drug offenders, including Francis Darrell Hayden, a Marion County native. Hayden had been serving a life prison sentence for marijuana cultivation because he was convicted three times for illegal cultivation, triggering the Three-strikes law. His last bust was in Michigan in 1998 for growing nearly 19,000 marijuana plants, after similar busts in 1980 and 1990.

In December 2016, President Obama granted clemency to an additional 231 incarcerated people, including another man from Marion County: Aaron Glasscock. Glasscock was arrested as a college student in the late 1990s as part of a drug trafficking ring operated by his father. In 2000, he was sentenced to 30 years in prison, just two months shy of his pre-med degree. Glasscock's commutation was announced just a few days before Johnny Boone was captured in Canada.

In January 2017, Higdon reported on these Obama clemencies of Cornbread men for Politico, suggesting that Obama could pardon Johnny Boone before he left office in "The Big Statement Obama Could Make on Legalizing Pot."

== Cornbread Mafia in media and popular culture ==
For much of the 1980s, the Cornbread Mafia was reported upon by photojournalist Steve Lowery of the Lebanon Enterprise, many of whose photographs are in Higdon's book.

By 2007, the term "Cornbread Mafia" had come to mean general Southern-style corruption. There is also a song by Molly Hatchet called Cornbread Mafia (on the Kingdom of XII album), and a now-defunct band that called itself Cornbread Mafia.

In a 2015 interview with Terry Gross, Graham Yost, the creator and show runner of the FX series Justified, said, "Honestly, we didn't know a lot about the Dixie Mafia. It also goes by the name The Cornbread Mafia. But we, you know, started poking around. Frankly, probably, we started with reading Wikipedia like anyone else..."

A series of unsolved murders in Bardstown, Kentucky have been incorrectly attributed to the Cornbread Mafia.

In 2016 Texas singer/songwriter Cody Jinks produced and released his album "Black Sheep" which featured a song about Johnny Boone simply titled "Johnny".

In April 2018, Nashville recording artist Sweepy Walker, the grandson of country singer Billy Walker, released "Cornbread Mafia" - a song about John Boone, “them Bickett boys, and too many more to mention.

In June 2018, singer/songwriter Tyler Childers held a benefit concert for Johnny Boone at Gravely Brewery in Louisville, telling an interviewer from the Louisville Eccentric Observer: "I read the book [‘Cornbread Mafia’] that Jim Higdon came out with, and I got some friends from over my way that were friends with Johnny — people that I hold in high regard, and people that hold him in high regard. I figured that I would try to help in some way.”

In November 2023, country music star Sticktight Akins released a music video for his hit song "Cornbread Mafia" on YouTube.

Mary Kutter, a country singer from Bardstown, Kentucky, teased a song clip about the Cornbread Mafia in early 2024.

A feature length documentary titled "Cornbread Mafia" debuted at the 2026 SXSW Film & TV Festival. Directed by Evan Mascagni and Drew Morris, the film gives a firsthand account of the rise and fall of the Cornbread Mafia using a mix of live action footage and 2D animation.

== See also ==
- Dixie Mafia
- Cowboy Mafia
