= Salinas v. United States =

- Supreme Court of the United States

Decided December 2, 1997
- Full case name: Salinas v. United States
- Citations: 522 U.S. 52 (more)

Holding
- 18 U.S.C. 666(a)(1)(B) does not require the Government to prove the bribe in question had a demonstrated effect upon federal funds.

Court membership
- Chief Justice William Rehnquist Associate Justices John P. Stevens · Sandra Day O'Connor; Antonin Scalia · Anthony Kennedy; David Souter · Clarence Thomas; Ruth Bader Ginsburg · Stephen Breyer

Case opinion
- Majority: Kennedy, joined by unanimous

Salinas v. United States, 522 U.S. 52 (1997), was a United States Supreme Court case in which the court held that 18 U.S.C. 666(a)(1)(B) does not require the Government to prove the bribe in question had a demonstrated effect upon federal funds.

== Background ==
This federal prosecution arose from a scheme in which a Texas county sheriff accepted money, and his deputy, Salinas, accepted two watches and a truck, in exchange for permitting women to make so-called "contact visits" to one Beltran, an incarcerated person held in the county jail pursuant to an agreement with the federal government. Salinas was charged with one count of violating the Racketeer Influenced and Corrupt Organizations Act (RICO), 18 U. S. C. § 1962(c), one count of conspiracy to violate RICO, § 1962(d), and two counts of bribery, § 666(a)(1)(B). The jury convicted him on all but the substantive RICO count, and the Fifth Circuit Court of Appeals affirmed.

The Supreme Court granted certiorari.

== Opinion of the court ==
The Supreme Court issued an opinion on December 2, 1997.
