= Racketeer Influenced and Corrupt Organizations Act =

US federal law

- Long title: An Act relating to the control of organized crime in the United States
- Acronyms (colloquial): OCCA; RICO
- Nicknames: Organized Crime Control Act of 1970
- Enacted by: the 91st United States Congress
- Effective: October 15, 1970

Citations
- Public law: 91-452
- Statutes at Large: 84 Stat. 922-3 aka 84 Stat. 941

Codification
- Titles amended: 18 U.S.C.: Crimes and Criminal Procedure
- U.S.C. sections created: 18 U.S.C. §§ 1961–1968

Legislative history
- Introduced in the Senate as S. 30 by John L. McClellan (D–AR); Passed the Senate on January 23, 1970 (74-1); Passed the House on October 7, 1970 (341-26); Signed into law by President Richard Nixon on October 15, 1970

United States Supreme Court cases
- United States v. Turkette, 452 U.S. 576 (1981); Russello v. United States, 464 U.S. 16 (1983); Sedima, SP RL v. Imrex Co., 473 U.S. 479 (1985); American Nat. Bank & Trust Co. of Chicago v. Haroco, Inc., 473 U.S. 606 (1985); Shearson/American Express Inc. v. McMahon, 482 U.S. 220 (1987); Agency Holding Corp. v. Malley-Duff & Associates, Inc., 483 U.S. 143 (1987); H.J. Inc. v. Northwestern Bell Tel. Co., 492 U.S. 229 (1989); Tafflin v. Levitt, 493 U.S. 455 (1990); Holmes v. Securities Investor Protection Corporation, 503 U.S. 258 (1992); Reves v. Ernst & Young, 507 U.S. 170 (1993); Alexander v. United States, 509 U.S. 544 (1993); National Organization for Women v. Scheidler, 510 U.S. 249 (1994); United States v. Robertson, 514 U.S. 669 (1995); Klehr v. A. O. Smith Corp., 521 U.S. 179 (1997); Salinas v. United States, 522 U.S. 52 (1997); Humana Inc. v. Forsyth, 525 U.S. 299 (1999); Rotella v. Wood, 528 U.S. 549 (2000); Beck v. Prupis, 529 U.S. 494 (2000); Cedric Kushner Promotions, Ltd. v. King, 533 U.S. 158 (2001); Scheidler v. National Organization for Women, 537 U.S. 393 (2003); PacifiCare Health Systems, Inc. v. Book, 538 U.S. 401 (2003); Anza v. Ideal Steel Supply Corp., 547 U.S. 451 (2006); Mohawk Industries, Inc. v. Williams, 547 U.S. 516 (2006); Scheidler v. National Organization for Women, 547 U.S. 9 (2006); Wilkie v. Robbins, 551 U.S. 537 (2007); Bridge v. Phoenix Bond & Indem. Co., 553 U.S. 639 (2008); Carlsbad Technology, Inc. v. HIF Bio, Inc., 556 U.S. 635 (2009); Boyle v. United States, 556 U.S. 938 (2009); Hemi Group, LLC v. City of New York, 559 U.S. 1 (2010); RJR Nabisco, Inc. v. European Community, No. 15-138, 579 U.S. ___ (2016); Yegiazaryan v. Smagin, No. 22-381, 599 U.S. ___ (2023); Medical Marijuana, Inc. v. Horn, No. 23-365, 603 U.S. ___ (2025)

The Racketeer Influenced and Corrupt Organizations (RICO) Act is a United States federal law that provides for extended criminal penalties and a civil cause of action for acts performed as part of an ongoing criminal organization.

RICO was enacted by Title IX of the Organized Crime Control Act of 1970 (Pub. L. 91–452, 84 Stat. 922, enacted October 15, 1970), and is codified at 18 U.S.C. ch. 96 as 18 U.S.C. §§ 1961–1968.

This article primarily covers the federal criminal statute, but since 1972, 33 U.S. states and territories have adopted state RICO laws, which although similar, cover additional state crimes and may differ from the federal law and each other in several respects.

== History ==
G. Robert Blakey, an adviser to the United States Senate Government Operations Committee, drafted the law under the close supervision of Senator John L. McClellan, the Chairman of the Criminal Law and Procedures Subcommittee of the Senate Judiciary Committee.

It was signed into law by U.S. President Richard Nixon. Prosecutors in the 1970s used it to prosecute the Mafia as well as others who were actively engaged in organized crime.

In subsequent decades, courts recognized that Congress had drafted the statute broadly, and prosecutors increasingly applied it to a wide range of criminal enterprises, including public corruption, securities fraud, street gangs, and white-collar crime.

== Summary ==
Under RICO, a person who has committed "at least two acts of racketeering activity" drawn from a list of 35 crimes (27 federal crimes and eight state crimes) within a 10-year period can be charged with racketeering if such acts are related in one of four specified ways to an enterprise.

Those found guilty of racketeering can be fined up to $25,000 and sentenced to 20 years in prison per racketeering count. In addition, the racketeer must forfeit all ill-gotten gains and interest in any business gained through a pattern of racketeering activity.

A US Attorney who indicts someone under RICO has the option of seeking a pre-trial restraining order or an injunction to temporarily seize a defendant's assets and prevent the transfer of potentially forfeitable property as well as to require the defendant to put up a performance bond. An injunction or performance bond ensures that there is something to seize in the event of a guilty verdict.

This provision prevented the owners of crime-related shell corporations from absconding with assets. In many cases, the threat of a RICO indictment can force defendants to plead guilty to lesser charges, in part because the seizure of assets would make it difficult to pay a defense attorney.

Despite its harsh provisions, a RICO-related charge is considered easy to prove in court because it focuses on patterns of behavior as opposed to criminal acts.

=== RICO predicate offenses ===
Under the law, the meaning of racketeering activity is set out at 18 U.S.C. § 1961. As currently amended, it includes:

- Any violation of state statutes against gambling, murder, kidnapping, extortion, arson, robbery, bribery, dealing in obscene matter, or dealing in a controlled substance or listed chemical (as defined in the Controlled Substances Act);
- Any act of bribery, counterfeiting, theft, embezzlement, fraud, dealing in obscene matter, obstruction of justice, slavery, racketeering, gambling, money laundering, commission of murder-for-hire, and many other offenses covered under the Federal criminal code (Title 18);
- Embezzlement of union funds;
- Bankruptcy fraud or securities fraud;
- Drug trafficking; long-term and elaborate drug networks can also be prosecuted using the Continuing Criminal Enterprise Statute;
- Criminal copyright infringement;
- Money laundering and related offenses;
- Bringing in, aiding or assisting aliens in illegally entering the country (if the action was for financial gain);
- Acts of terrorism.

A pattern of racketeering activity requires at least two acts of racketeering activity, one of which occurred after the effective date of this chapter and the last of which occurred within ten years (excluding any period of imprisonment) after the commission of a prior act of racketeering activity. The US Supreme Court has instructed federal courts to follow the continuity-plus-relationship test in order to determine whether the facts of a specific case give rise to an established pattern. The illegal acts forming a pattern are called "predicate" offenses. Predicate acts are related if they "have the same or similar purposes, results, participants, victims, or methods of commission, or otherwise are interrelated by distinguishing characteristics and are not isolated events." Continuity is both a closed and open ended concept, referring to either a closed period of conduct, or to past conduct that by its nature projects into the future with a threat of repetition.

=== Enterprise relationships ===
There must be one of four specified relationships between the defendants and the enterprise. Either the defendants:

- invested the proceeds of the pattern of racketeering activity into the enterprise (18 U.S.C. § 1962(a)); or
- acquired or maintained an interest in, or control of, the enterprise through the pattern of racketeering activity (subsection (b)); or
- conducted or participated in the affairs of the enterprise "through" the pattern of racketeering activity (subsection (c)); or
- conspired to do one of the above (subsection (d)).

The US Supreme Court noted that a commentator had used the terms prize, instrument, victim, or perpetrator for these four relationships.

=== Civil provisions ===
18 U.S.C. § 1964 provides for civil remedies in cases of violations outlined in 18 U.S.C. § 1962. The following are established:

- District Courts may issue court orders appropriate to the restriction or dissolution of entities involved in section 1962 violations.
- The Attorney General may start civil proceedings which allow for further court action pending final decision (i.e., injunctions, restraining orders, and acceptance of satisfactory performance bonds).
- Allows for the commencement of a civil action by a private party to recover damages sustained as a result of the commission of a RICO predicate offense.
- Any individual or organization found guilty during a RICO criminal proceeding may not deny allegations brought forth in criminal proceedings in any civil cases.

The civil provisions of the RICO Act provide versatility in how the government may work to dissolve criminal entities. Due to the lessened burden of proof in civil court (i.e., preponderance of evidence), the United States may circumvent restrictions set forth in criminal proceedings. Discovery tools, permitted use of illegally obtained evidence, and adverse inferences broaden government intervention in combatting U.S.C. § 1962 violations.

=== Civil suits ===
RICO also permits a private individual "damaged in his business or property" by a racketeer to file a civil suit. The plaintiff must prove the existence of an enterprise. The defendants are not the enterprise; in other words, the defendants and the enterprise are not one and the same.

A civil RICO action can be filed in state or federal court.

Both the criminal and the civil components allow the recovery of treble damages (triple the amount of actual/compensatory damages). If the United States government is the plaintiff in civil court, treble damages may be replaced with a request for equitable remedies and preliminary injunctive reliefs.

=== Organized crime ===
Although its primary intent was to deal with organized crime, Blakey said that Congress never intended it merely to apply to the Mob. He once told Time, "We don't want one set of rules for people whose collars are blue or whose names end in vowels, and another set for those whose collars are white and have Ivy League diplomas." In the years following its passage, RICO had been criticized for its extensive use against entities other than organized crime. One critic pointed towards the number of civil suits that were brought against businesses, labor unions, and other private parties, which made up for 90% of all civil RICO cases, according to the American Bar Association.

On December 1, 1977, the federal grand jury in the Eastern District of Louisiana indicted thirteen defendants, Robert J. L'Hoste & Company, Inc. for conspiracy and racketeering activity. After the defendants moved to dismiss the indictment for overbreadth and vagueness, the grand jury returned a superseding indictment on February 27, 1978, charging the same offenses and naming eleven defendants, including the appellants. The district court denied a motion to dismiss the superseding indictment, and the first RICO trial commenced on March 13, 1978. The jury convicted the four appellants and another corporation on both the conspiracy and racketeering counts.

In May 1979, prosecutor Mark L. Webb, Northern District of California, conducted RICO trial, United States v. Sam Bailey Gang. The successful prosecution used the RICO statute to allege that a gang of postal burglars and a Nevada fence collaborated criminally in an organized crime fashion. The case did not involve a Mafia crime family.

Subsequently, the US Attorney's office for the Eastern District of Arkansas used the RICO Act on October 2, 1978, to indict officers of Local 1292 of the Laborers International Union of North America. Special Assistant United States Attorney, Samuel A. Perroni, prosecuted the first labor union official trial that began on June 5, 1979. Perroni's successful prosecution used RICO to convict the defendants of conspiracy, murder for hire, perjury and embezzlement of union property in United States v. Allison, et al.

The US Attorney's Office in the Southern District of New York employed the RICO Act on September 18, 1979, in United States v. Scotto. Scotto, who was convicted on charges of racketeering, accepting unlawful labor payments, and income tax evasion, headed the International Longshoremen's Association.

During the 1980s and the 1990s, federal prosecutors used the law to bring charges against several Mafia figures. In 1985, United States Attorney Rudy Giuliani (who would be indicted under Georgia RICO laws in August 2023) indicted 11 organized crime figures in United States v. Anthony Salerno, et al, also known as Mafia Commission Trial. Using the RICO Act, Giuliani charged the heads of New York's so-called "Five Families" with extortion, labor racketeering, and murder for hire.

Three Assistant United States Attorneys assisted in the trial: Michael Chertoff, the eventual second United States Secretary of Homeland Security and co-author of the Patriot Act; John Savarese, later a partner at Wachtell Lipton Rosen & Katz; and Gil Childers, a later deputy chief of the criminal division for the Southern District of New York and later managing director in the legal department at Goldman Sachs.

Time magazine called the "Case of Cases" possibly "the most significant assault on the infrastructure of organized crime since the high command of the Chicago Mafia was swept away in 1943" and quoted Giuliani's stated intention: "Our approach is to wipe out the five families."

Three heads of the Five Families were sentenced to 100 years in prison on January 13, 1987. The Genovese and Colombo leaders, Tony Salerno and Carmine Persico received additional sentences in separate trials, with 70-year and 39-year sentences to run consecutively. The Gambino crime family boss Paul Castellano and his underboss, Thomas Bilotti, were murdered on the streets of Midtown Manhattan on December 16, 1985.

== State laws ==
As of 2014, 33 states as well as Puerto Rico and the United States Virgin Islands had adopted state RICO laws to cover state offenses under a similar scheme.

== Famous cases ==
The Lucchese crime family was one of the "Five Families" that dominated organized crime activities in New York City. Prosecuting attorneys Gregory O'Connell and Charles Rose used RICO charges to break up the family over an 18-month period.

Several members of the Latin Kings have been convicted of RICO offenses.

=== 1979, Cowboy Mafia ===
RICO was instrumental in indicting members of the Cowboy Mafia from Texas, Tennessee and Florida. During 1977 and 1978, this group imported over 106 tons of marijuana. Using the shrimp boats Agnes Pauline, Monkey, Jubilee, and Bayou Blues, the group made six trips from Colombia to Texas. The group was arrested in 1978 after the federal government seized the Agnes Pauline when they were unloading their cargo in Port Arthur, Texas. In 1979, twenty-six members of the smuggling ring were convicted. Charles "Muscles" Foster, a ranch foreman and the head of the operation, pleaded innocent by reason of insanity and was acquitted in 1980. In August 1981, Rex Cauble was indicted by a grand jury, as the government believed he was the financial backer of the smugglers. Foster was the foreman for his ranches, and the drugs were transported to Cauble's ranches throughout Texas. Cauble was a multi-millionaire, the former chairman of the Texas Aeronautics Commission, and an honorary Texas Ranger. He was also the owner of Cutter Bill, a famous cutting horse. Cauble was convicted in January 1982 on ten counts: two counts of violating the Racketeer Influenced and Corrupt Organizations Act statute (RICO), conspiracy to violate RICO, three violations of the Interstate Commerce Travel Act, and four counts of misapplication of bank funds. He was sentenced to ten concurrent terms of five years. He completed his prison term, was released in September 1987, and died in 2003.

Three books about the group were published: The Cowboy Mafia (2003) by Cauble's personal jet pilot Roy Graham; Catching the Katy (2017) by Barker Milford; and A Conspiracy Revealed by DEA agent Daniel Wedeman Sr.

As a result of the RICO conviction, Cauble forfeited his 31% interest in Cauble Enterprises, including two Cutter Bill Western World stores, three Texas banks (Western State Bank in Denton, Dallas International Bank and South Main Bank of Houston), six ranches, a welding supply company, and oil and gas holdings. The company's worth was estimated at $80 million. However, the government sold their interest back to the other partners (Cauble's wife and son) for an estimated $12 million.

=== 1979, Hells Angels Motorcycle Club ===
In 1979, the United States Federal Government went after Sonny Barger and several members and associates of the Oakland chapter of the Hells Angels using RICO. In United States vs. Barger, the prosecution team attempted to demonstrate a pattern of behavior to convict Barger and other members of the club of RICO offenses related to guns and illegal drugs. The jury acquitted Barger on the RICO charges with a hung jury on the predicate acts: "There was no proof it was part of club policy, and as much as they tried, the government could not come up with any incriminating minutes from any of our meetings mentioning drugs and guns."

=== 1980, Gil Dozier ===
In 1980, Louisiana Commissioner of Agriculture and Forestry Gil Dozier was charged with violating both Hobbs and RICO laws. The Baton Rouge-based United States District Court for the Middle District of Louisiana accused Dozier of compelling companies doing business with his department to make campaign contributions on his behalf. On September 23, 1980, a jury convicted Dozier of five counts of extortion and racketeering.

The judge sentenced Dozier to 10 years imprisonment which was later upgraded to 18 years when other offenses were determined. A $25,000 fine was suspended pending appeal, and Dozier remained free on bail. The United States Court of Appeals for the Fifth Circuit in New Orleans upheld Dozier's conviction. He eventually served nearly four years until a presidential commutation freed him in 1986.

=== 1984, Key West Police Department ===
Around June 1984, the Key West Police Department located in Monroe County, Florida, was declared a criminal enterprise under the federal RICO statutes after a lengthy United States Department of Justice investigation. Several high-ranking officers of the department, including Deputy Police Chief Raymond Cassamayor, were arrested on federal charges of running a protection racket for illegal cocaine smugglers. At trial, a witness testified he routinely delivered bags of cocaine to the Deputy Chief's office at City Hall.

=== 1984, The Order ===
The Order was an American far-right terrorist group active from September 1983 to December 1984. Their intention was to precipitate the collapse of the federal Government, which they referred to as Zionist Occupation Government (ZOG) and deemed illegitimate. Their intention was to do so via a campaign of bombings and assassinations. However, in order to fund their actions they turned to armored car robbery and a counterfeiting and laundering operation. The FBI began to investigate the group using RICO following the assassination of Jewish radio host Alan Berg on June 18, 1984, and the arrest of member Tom Martinez, for using counterfeit bills to buy liquor. Martinez informed on The Order and RICO was used by the FBI to bring 10 members of The Order to trial and achieved conviction of racketeering and conspiracy charges. Over the course of The Order's activities they had distributed millions of dollars to the wider far-right movement and Operation Clean Sweep used RICO to bring 14 leading members of the far-right to trial on charges of seditious conspiracy at Fort Smith, alleging their receipt of The Order's funds as connection to their attempt to overthrow the federal government.

=== 1986, Iran-Contra ===
In 1986, the Christic Institute filed a civil RICO case naming 30 defendants who were also implicated in the Iran-Contra scandal that they were also part of a conspiracy behind the La Penca bombing. The suit, titled Avirgan v Hull named several Central Intelligence Agency figures and accused them of participating in illegal political assassinations, as well as arms and drug trafficking. The suit was eventually dismissed in 1989, and lead attorney Daniel Sheehan alleged members of the Iran-Contra enterprise were behind the assassination of judge Robert Vance who was expected to reverse the dismissal. G. Robert Blakey stated it was the best-charged RICO case he had seen, and the litigation spawned a national fundraising effort. In 1990, Bruce Springsteen and Bonnie Raitt held a benefit concert to support the litigation. A 500-page affidavit filed in December 1986 was also published as "The Shadow Government."

=== 1989, Michael Milken ===
On March 29, 1989, American financier Michael Milken was indicted on 98 counts of racketeering and fraud relating to an investigation into an allegation of insider trading and other offenses. Milken was accused of using a wide-ranging network of contacts to manipulate stock and bond prices. It was one of the first occasions that a RICO indictment was brought against an individual with no ties to organized crime. Milken pleaded guilty to six lesser felonies of securities fraud and tax evasion, rather than risk spending the rest of his life in prison and ended up serving 22 months in prison. Milken was also ordered banned for life from the securities industry.

On September 7, 1988, Milken's employer, Drexel Burnham Lambert, was threatened with RICO charges under respondeat superior, the legal doctrine that corporations are responsible for their employees' crimes. Drexel avoided RICO charges by entering an Alford plea to lesser felonies of stock parking and stock manipulation. In a carefully worded plea, Drexel said it was "not in a position to dispute the allegations" made by the Government. If Drexel had been indicted under RICO statutes, it would have had to post a performance bond of up to $1 billion to avoid having its assets frozen. That would have taken precedence over all of the firm's other obligations, including the loans that provided 96 percent of its capital base. If the bond ever had to be paid, its shareholders would have been practically wiped out. Since banks will not extend credit to a firm indicted under RICO, an indictment would have likely put Drexel out of business. By at least one estimate, a RICO indictment would have destroyed the firm within a month. Years later, Drexel President and CEO Fred Joseph said that Drexel had no choice but to plead guilty because "a financial institution cannot survive a RICO indictment."

=== 1992, Gambino crime family ===
John Gotti and Frank Locascio were convicted on April 2, 1992, under the RICO Act and later sentenced to life in prison.

=== 1998, Embassy Bombings and Al Qaeda ===
After the 1998 simultaneous bombings of the US Embassies in Tanzania and Kenya, the US Department of Justice sued Osama bin Laden in absentia under the RICO statute. A 2004 documentary by BBC filmmaker Adam Curtis called The Power of Nightmares argued controversially that in order to prosecute bin Laden in absentia, U.S. prosecutors had to prove that he was the head of a criminal organization responsible for the bombings. Curtis' documentary alleged that the prosecution found a former associate of bin Laden, Jamal al-Fadl, and paid him to testify that bin Laden was the head of a massive terrorist organization called "al-Qaeda," which would satisfy the requirements of the RICO statute, even though the formal terrorist organization named "al-Qaeda" did not actually exist.

=== 2000, Los Angeles Police Department ===
In 1999 the Rampart scandal broke in the Los Angeles Police Department exposing widespread criminal activity within the department's anti-gang unit called CRASH. 70 officers were initially implicated in planting evidence, dealing drugs, bank robbery, and unlawful killings and beatings. In 2000, Federal District judge William Rea ruled the RICO statute could be used to name the entire LAPD as a criminal enterprise for individuals suing it over police brutality and misconduct. Over 140 civil RICO lawsuits were filed against the department. In July 2001, US District Judge Gary A. Feess said that the plaintiffs did not have standing to sue the LAPD under RICO, because they were alleging personal injuries rather than economic or property damage.

=== 2002, Major League Baseball ===
In 2001, Major League Baseball team owners voted to eliminate two teams, presumably the Minnesota Twins and Montreal Expos. In 2002, the former minority owners of the Expos filed charges under the RICO Act against MLB commissioner Bud Selig and former Expos owner Jeffrey Loria, claiming that Selig and Loria deliberately conspired to devalue the team for personal benefit in preparation for a move. If found liable, Major League Baseball could have been responsible for up to $300 million in punitive damages. The case lasted two years, successfully stalling the Expos' move to Washington or contraction during that time. It was eventually sent to arbitration, where the arbiters ruled in favor of Major League Baseball, permitting the move to Washington to take place.

=== 2004, Bonanno crime family ===
Bonanno crime family boss Joseph Massino's trial began on May 24, 2004, with judge Nicholas Garaufis presiding and Greg D. Andres and Robert Henoch heading the prosecution. Massino faced 11 RICO counts for seven murders (due to the prospect of prosecutors seeking the death penalty for the murder of Bonanno caporegime Gerlando Sciascia, that case severed to be tried separately), arson, extortion, loansharking, illegal gambling, and money laundering. After deliberating for five days, the jury found Massino guilty of all 11 counts on July 30, 2004. His sentencing was initially scheduled for October 12, and he was expected to receive a sentence of life imprisonment with no possibility of parole. The jury also approved the prosecutors' recommended $10 million forfeiture of the proceeds of his reign as Bonanno boss on the day of the verdict.

Immediately after his July 30 conviction, as court was adjourned, Massino requested a meeting with Judge Garaufis, where he made his first offer to cooperate. He did so in hopes of sparing his life; he was facing the death penalty if found guilty of Sciascia's murder. Indeed, one of John Ashcroft's final acts as Attorney General was to order federal prosecutors to seek the death penalty for Massino. Massino thus stood to be the first Mafia boss to be executed for his crimes, and the first mob boss to face the death penalty since Lepke Buchalter was executed in 1944. Massino was the first sitting boss of a New York crime family to turn state's evidence, and the second in the history of the American Mafia to do so (Philadelphia crime family boss Ralph Natale had flipped in 1999 when facing drug charges).

=== 2005, Chicago Outfit ===
In 2005, the US Department of Justice's Operation Family Secrets indicted 14 Chicago Outfit (also known as the Outfit, the Chicago Mafia, the Chicago Mob, or the Organization) members and associates under RICO predicates. Five defendants were convicted of RICO violations and other crimes. Six pleaded guilty, two died before trial, and one was too sick to be tried.

=== 2005, Connecticut Senator Len Fasano ===
In 2005, a federal jury ordered Fasano to pay $500,000 under RICO for illegally helping a client hide their assets in a bankruptcy case.

=== 2005, Mohawk Industries ===
The Eleventh Circuit Court of Appeals ruled in Williams v. Mohawk Industries, Inc. No. 05-465, 547 U.S. 516 (2006) that a corporation could be held liable for "unlawfully conducting the affairs of an association-in-fact enterprise comprised of the corporation and its agents." Mohawk Industries had allegedly hired illegal aliens, in violation of RICO. On appeal, the Supreme Court was asked to decide whether Mohawk Industries, along with recruiting agencies, constituted an "enterprise" that could be prosecuted under RICO. The Court vacated the Eleventh Circuit decision that had permitted RICO liability.

=== 2006, Gambino crime family ===
In Tampa, on October 16, 2006, four members of the Gambino crime family (Capo Ronald Trucchio, Terry Scaglione, Steven Catallono, and Anthony Mucciarone and associate Kevin McMahon) were tried under RICO statutes, found guilty, and sentenced to life in prison.

=== 2009, Scott W. Rothstein ===
Scott W. Rothstein is a disbarred lawyer and the former managing shareholder, chairman, and chief executive officer of the now-defunct Rothstein Rosenfeldt Adler law firm. He was accused of funding his philanthropy, political contributions, law firm salaries, and an extravagant lifestyle with a massive 1.2 billion dollar Ponzi scheme. On December 1, 2009, Rothstein turned himself in to federal authorities and was subsequently arrested on charges related to RICO. Although his arraignment plea was not guilty, Rothstein cooperated with the government and reversed his plea to guilty of five federal crimes on January 27, 2010. Bond was denied by US Magistrate Judge Robin Rosenbaum, who ruled that due to his ability to forge documents, he was considered a flight risk. On June 9, 2010, Rothstein received a 50-year prison sentence after a hearing in federal court in Fort Lauderdale.

=== 2011, Michael Conahan and Mark Ciavarella ===
A federal grand jury in the Middle District of Pennsylvania handed down a 48-count indictment against former Luzerne County Court of Common Pleas Judges Michael Conahan and Mark Ciavarella. The judges were charged with RICO after allegedly committing acts of mail and wire fraud, tax evasion, money laundering, and honest services fraud. The judges were accused of taking kickbacks for housing juveniles, that the judges convicted of mostly petty crimes, at a private detention center. The incident was dubbed by many local and national newspapers as the "kids for cash scandal". On February 18, 2011, a federal jury found Mark Ciavarella guilty of racketeering because of his involvement in accepting illegal payments from Robert Mericle, the developer of PA Child Care, and Attorney Robert Powell, a co-owner of the facility. Ciavarella is facing 38 other counts in federal court.

=== 2012, AccessHealthSource ===
Eleven defendants were indicted on RICO charges for allegedly assisting AccessHealthSource, a local health care provider, in obtaining and maintaining lucrative contracts with local and state government entities in the city of El Paso, Texas, "through bribery of and kickbacks to elected officials or himself and others, extortion under color of authority, fraudulent schemes and artifices, false pretenses, promises and representations and deprivation of the right of citizens to the honest services of their elected local officials" (see indictment).

=== 2013, Trump University ===
Art Cohen vs. Donald J. Trump was a civil RICO class action suit filed October 18, 2013, accusing Donald Trump of misrepresenting Trump University "to make tens of millions of dollars" but delivering "neither Donald Trump nor a university". The case was being heard in U.S. District Court for the Southern District of California in San Diego, No. 3:2013cv02519, by Judge Gonzalo P. Curiel. It was scheduled for argument beginning November 28, 2016. However, on November 18 and shortly after Trump won the presidential election, this case and two others were settled for a total of $25 million to be paid to the plaintiffs, but without any admission of wrongdoing by Trump.

=== 2015, Drummond Company ===
In 2015, the Drummond Company sued attorneys Terrence P. Collingsworth and William R. Scherer, the advocacy group International Rights Advocates (IRAdvocates), and Dutch businessman Albert van Bilderbeek, one of the owners of Llanos Oil, accusing them of violating RICO by alleging that Drummond had worked alongside Autodefensas Unidas de Colombia to murder labor union leaders within proximity of their Colombian coal mines, which Drummond denies.

=== 2015, FIFA ===
Fourteen defendants affiliated with FIFA were indicted under the RICO act on 47 counts for "racketeering, wire fraud and money laundering conspiracies, among other offenses, in connection with the defendants' participation in a 24-year scheme to enrich themselves through the corruption of international soccer". The defendants include many current and former high-ranking officers of FIFA and its affiliate CONCACAF. The defendants had allegedly used the enterprise as a front to collect millions of dollars in bribes, which may have influenced Russia and Qatar's winning bids to host the FIFA World Cup in 2018 and 2022, respectively.

=== 2022, YSL Records ===
In May 2022, rapper Young Thug was arrested in a RICO indictment filed against him and his YSL Records label. The indictment, filed by Fulton County District Attorney Fani Willis, consisted of 56 counts against 28 affiliates of the label, with Thug himself facing 8 charges. The indictment alleged that YSL was not only a record label, but a street gang that was partaking in violent activity in Georgia. The case, originally presided over by Judge Ural D. Glanville, has been mired in controversy; including allegations from Thug's lawyer Brian Steel that Glanville had participated in a secret ex-parte meeting with the prosecution. The allegations of this meeting resulted in Steel being held in contempt of court and taken into custody, as he refused to disclose the source of his information; he was sentenced to 10 weekends in jail, but this was overturned on appeal. Shortly thereafter, Glanville was recused from the case. The case was then presided over by Judge Paige Reese Whitaker.

This case is notable as it included the longest jury selection process in Georgia's history (10 months), and it was the longest trial in Georgia's history.

=== 2023, Donald Trump ===
In August 2023, the District Attorney of Fulton County, Georgia, Fani Willis, filed charges under the Georgia state RICO act against Donald Trump and 18 co-defendants, including Rudy Giuliani. The Georgia law contains a list of 40 state crimes or acts that together can be classified as "racketeering schemes". It is broader than the federal law in that attempting, soliciting, coercing, and intimidating another person to commit any of the offenses can also be considered organized crime. The case was dropped when Trump was elected president in 2024, due to the impossibility of having a trial of a sitting president, and the difficulty of separating the co-defendants' case from his.

== Application of RICO laws ==
Although some of the RICO predicate acts are extortion and blackmail, one of the most successful applications of the RICO laws has been the ability to indict and or sanction individuals for their behavior and actions committed against witnesses and victims in alleged retaliation or retribution for cooperating with federal law enforcement or intelligence agencies.

Violations of the RICO laws can be alleged in civil lawsuit cases or for criminal charges. In these instances, charges can be brought against individuals or corporations in retaliation for said individuals or corporations working with law enforcement. Further, charges can also be brought against individuals or corporations who have sued or filed criminal charges against a defendant.

Anti-SLAPP (strategic lawsuit against public participation) laws can be applied in an attempt to curb alleged abuses of the legal system by individuals or corporations who use the courts as a weapon to retaliate against whistle blowers or victims or to silence another's speech. RICO could be alleged if it can be shown that lawyers or their clients conspired and collaborated to concoct fictitious legal complaints solely in retribution and retaliation for themselves having been brought before the courts.

Although the RICO laws may cover drug trafficking crimes in addition to other more traditional RICO predicate acts such as extortion, blackmail, and racketeering, large-scale and organized drug networks are now commonly prosecuted under the Continuing Criminal Enterprise Statute, also known as the "Kingpin Statute". The CCE laws target only traffickers who are responsible for long-term and elaborate conspiracies, whereas the RICO law covers a variety of organized criminal behaviors.

== See also ==
- Continuing Criminal Enterprise
- Criminal Tribes Act
- Patriot Act
- Continuing Financial Crime Enterprise Statute of 1990 (USA vs. Harris)
- Malone Lam
