= Cutter Bill =

Quarter Horse show stallion and sire

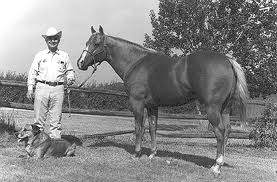
- Cutter Bill
- Breed: Quarter Horse
- Discipline: Cutting
- Sire: Buddy Dexter
- Grandsire: Dexter
- Dam: Billie Silvertone
- Maternal grandsire: Silvertone
- Sex: Stallion
- Foaled: 1955
- Died: 1982 (aged 26–27)
- Country: United States
- Color: Palomino
- Breeder: R. L. Underwood
- Owner: Rex Cauble

Other awards
- AQHA Performance Register of Merit; AQHA Champion; AQHA Superior Cutting Horse; 1962 AQHA High Point Cutting Horse; 1962 NCHA World Champion Cutting Horse; 1963 NCHA Reserve World Champion Horse; NCHA Silver Award; NCHA Bronze Award

Honors
- American Quarter Horse Hall of Fame

Cutter Bill (1955–1982) was a Quarter Horse stallion and the 1962 National Cutting Horse Association (NCHA) Open World Champion cutting horse with record earnings for the year. He also won the 1962 American Quarter Horse Association (AQHA) Honor Roll cutting horse award which made him the first horse to have won both the NCHA and AQHA awards in the same year. Cutter Bill was owned by the flamboyant Texas millionaire Rex Cauble who in 1962 decided to campaign Cutter Bill with Sonny Perry in the saddle showing him. In order for Cutter Bill to compete in as many shows as possible that year, Cauble flew Cutter Bill and three other horses on his private jet to various shows.

== Background ==
It was R. L. Underwood's linebreeding program to preserve the Copperbottom bloodlines that produced Cutter Bill, a 1955 palomino Quarter Horse stallion, AQHA registration #53703. His sire, Buddy Dexter, was the inbred progeny of a father to daughter cross along with some linebreeding throughout the pedigree.

In 1956, Cauble and his then-wife, Josephine, attended Underwood's dispersal sale with the intention of buying broodmares to breed to Cauble's foundation Quarter Horse sires, Wimpy P-1, Silver King P-183 and Hard Twist P-555. Josephine was attracted to a yearling palomino colt that was tied to a fence at the sale. She persuaded Cauble to bid on him, which he agreed to do up to a set price of US$1,000.00 but by the time the bidding was over, Cauble had paid US$2500 for the colt. He wasn't as impressed by the colt's conformation as he was by his demeanor. Little did he know that colt would grow up to be Cutter Bill, a legend in the Quarter Horse world. Cauble broke Cutter Bill himself, and for the first couple of years used him to tease mares in preparation for breeding them to his foundation stallions.

== Cutting competition ==
Cutter Bill was started on cattle in June 1958. "Cauble said the first good trainer Cutter Bill met was Willis Bennett of Gail, Texas", a trainer Cauble hired to work at his ranch in Crockett, Texas. Bennett showed Cutter Bill to earn 1959 AQHA High Point Junior Cutting Horse. He was later trained by Willis Bennett's older brother Milt, who owned and rode Snooky to win the 1955 NCHA World Championship. Other trainers who rode Cutter Bill include Connie Wills, Roy Huffaker, John Carter and Tommy Arhopulous.

In 1962, Sonny Perry, who won the 1961 NCHA World Championship riding Senor George, asked Cauble if he could haul Cutter Bill for the world title. The pair set the 1962 NCHA earnings record capturing the NCHA World Championship and also earned the AQHA Honor Roll award. He was the 1963 NCHA Reserve World Champion, earning a total of $35,964.05 in NCHA sponsored cuttings. In 1964, Rex Cauble showed Cutter Bill in the non-professional division, and won the 1964 NCHA Non-Pro World Championship title. His AQHA awards in 1962 included High Point Cutting Horse, as well as AQHA Champion and Performance Register of Merit awards. He was also an AQHA Superior Cutting Horse. He was the second horse to win both the NCHA World Champion title and the AQHA High Point Cutting title, Poco Stampede was the first, but he was the first to do it in the same year.

== Progeny ==
Among his famous offspring were Cutters Indian who was the 1972 AQHA High Point Jr. Western Pleasure Stallion, the 1972 AQHA High Point 3-year-old Halter Stallion, and the 1972 AQHA High Point Jr. Trail Stallion, Bill's Highness, Cutter's First, Bill's Jazabell, Cutter's Lad, Pecos Billie, Blaze Face Bill, Cutter's Streak and Bill's Loceta. Bill's Lady Day won the 1987 AQHA Senior Calf Roping World Champion title and Cutter's Rocket won two youth World Championships in working cowhorse in 1983 and 1985. Royal Cutter won the 1971 National Reined Cow Horse Association's Snaffle Bit Futurity and then later won the hackamore and bridle sweepstakes held by the same organization.

== Recognition ==
Cutter Bill gained further fame when Rex Cauble opened two upscale western apparel stores and named them Cutter Bill's Western World. Cutter Bill placed his hoofs in wet cement outside the Houston store at its opening in 1967. However, Cauble lost the stores after being convicted in the Cowboy Mafia drug smuggling trial. Cutter Bill died in the fall of 1982 and was buried on the Cauble Ranch in Denton, TX. He was inducted into the AQHA Hall of Fame in 2003, the same year Rex Cauble died.

== Pedigree ==
The Yellow Stud
Golden Chief
quarter mare
Dexter
Tom (Scooter)
Miss Tommie
unknown
Buddy Dexter
Golden Chief
Dexter
Miss Tommie
Little March
Mustard Seed (TB)
March
Lowe Brothers quarter mare
Cutter Bill
Jud
Dunny Boy
mare by Yellow Wolf
Silvertone
unknown
bay quarter mare
unknown
Billie Silvertone
The Yellow Stud
Golden Chief
quarter mare
Star Light
Tom by Rainy Day
Y Ranch quarter mare
unknown
