= Theft or bribery concerning programs receiving federal funds =

US federal crime

Theft or bribery concerning programs receiving federal funds (sometimes referred to as program fraud or program bribery) is a federal crime under 18 U.S.C. § 666. The purpose of this statute is protect the integrity of the vast sums of money distributed through federal programs. The section is designed to facilitate the prosecution of persons who steal money or otherwise divert property or services from state and local governments or private organizations—for example, universities, foundations and business corporations—that receive large amounts of federal funds.

== Definition of offense ==
Subsection (a)(1)(A) of Section 666 prohibits the embezzlement, stealing, obtaining by fraud or otherwise unauthorized conversion to the use of any person other than the rightful owner or the intentional misapplication of property having a value of $5,000 or more by an agent, typically an employee, of an organization or of a state, local or Indian tribal government agency that receives $10,000 or more annually in federal assistance. The maximum penalty is imprisonment for 10 years and a fine of the greater of $100,000 or twice the amount obtained in violation of the section.

Subsection (a)(1)(B) prohibits such agents and employees from soliciting or accepting bribes and gratuities in connection with any business transaction involving $5,000 or more.

Subsection (a)(2) prohibits anyone from offering bribes and gratuities in connection with any business transaction involving $5,000 or more.

== Bribery ==
In the US federal criminal code, bribery by public officials is defined in Title 18 of the United States Code, § 201.

== Legislative history and purpose ==
18 U.S.C § 666 was enacted in 1984. The legislative history of the statute indicates that Congress intended to eliminate a gap in the criminal statutes which made it more difficult to prosecute theft from federally funded programs:

In many cases, such [Sec. 641] prosecution is impossible because title has passed to the recipient before the property is stolen, or the funds are so commingled that the Federal character of the funds cannot be shown. This situation gives rise to a serious gap in the law, since even though title to the monies may have passed, the Federal Government clearly retains a strong interest in assuring the integrity of such program funds. Indeed, a recurring problem in this area (as well as in the related area of bribery of the administrators of such funds) has been that state and local prosecutors are often unwilling to commit their limited resources to pursue such thefts, deeming the United States the principal party aggrieved.

Under prior law, with few exceptions, thefts from such governments or organizations could be prosecuted only under the general theft statute, 18 U.S.C. § 641 (which covers theft of U.S. government property), or the statute prohibiting theft of funds under the Comprehensive Employment and Training Act (CETA), 18 U.S.C. § 665. Use of the general theft statute was often precluded because either the title to the property stolen had passed from the federal government before it was stolen or the funds were so commingled that their federal character could not be shown.

Consequently, Congress created a separate offense under 18 U.S.C. § 666 to ensure the integrity of federal program funds administered through private organizations and state, local, or Indian tribal government agencies and to fill an apparent gap in the law that neither 18 U.S.C. § 641 nor § 665 could reach.
