= The Most Popular Boy =

- Vice Principals episode
- Episode no.: Season 2 Episode 6
- Directed by: David Gordon Green
- Written by: Danny McBride; John Carcieri; Hayes Davenport
- Cinematography by: Michael Simmonds
- Editing by: Todd Zelin; Justin Bourret
- Original release date: October 22, 2017
- Running time: 32 minutes

Guest appearances
- Susan Park as Christine Russell; Edi Patterson as Jen Abbott; James M. Connor as Martin Seychelles; Marcuis Harris as Terrance Willows; Maya G. Love as Janelle Gamby; June Kyoto Lu as Mi Cha; Ashley Spillers as Janice Swift; Christopher Thornton as Mr. Milner

Episode chronology
← Previous "A Compassionate Man"	Next → "Spring Break"

"The Most Popular Boy" is the sixth episode of the second season of the American dark comedy television series Vice Principals. It is the fifteenth overall episode of the series and was written by series co-creator Danny McBride, co-executive producer John Carcieri, and Hayes Davenport, and directed by executive producer David Gordon Green. It was released on HBO on October 22, 2017.

The series follows the co-vice principals of North Jackson High School, Neal Gamby and Lee Russell, both of which are disliked for their personalities. When the principal decides to retire, an outsider named Dr. Belinda Brown is assigned to succeed him. This prompts Gamby and Russell to put aside their differences and team up to take her down. In the episode, Gamby starts hanging out with the teachers, discovering that they are planning to have Russell fired.

According to Nielsen Media Research, the episode was seen by an estimated 0.647 million household viewers and gained a 0.3 ratings share among adults aged 18–49. The episode received extremely positive reviews from critics, who praised the performances, character development and emotional tone.

== Plot ==
Nash (Dale Dickey) visits Gamby (Danny McBride) at his cabin to help in his investigation, where she is surprised to see that Gamby slept with Abbott (Edi Patterson), although Gamby reaffirms they are not dating and keeps it a secret from other teachers. Russell (Walton Goggins) tries to fix his marriage with Christine (Susan Park), which is now strained after his birthday party. His attempts are also ruined by the fact that he keeps lying, including buying food and claiming to have cooked it.

Russell has also lost support among the teachers, while Gamby has been hanging out with them. Wanting to get closer to the teachers in order to further investigation, Gamby asks Abbott to help with his look, so she takes him shopping for clothing to make him popular. He tells Russell that he will join the teachers at a bar, so Russell decides to get himself invited when the teachers ignore his presence. At the bar, Abbott proudly announces that she and Gamby are dating, which is supported by the teachers and surprises Snodgrass (Georgia King). Russell's presence ruins the evening, with Abbott claiming that Gamby only invited him to mock him, which he actually agrees. Abbott also reveals that she and the other teachers plan to sabotage Russell, with the exception of Snodgrass. Their plan is to get Russell fired for poor test scores.

Although not wanting to go with Russell, Gamby and Abbott accompany him to his house for drinks. However, they are surprised to discover that the furniture is gone, and Christine and Mi Cha have also left. Russell finds a note, where Christine states their marriage is over, causing Russell to break down. The next day, the exams take place, with teachers noting that most of the students will fail. Snodgrass is tasked with taking over the exams, which she has to deliver to the board. Unwilling to let the students and Russell be affected, Gamby intercepts Snodgrass to take the exams, and she agrees to help him. They take them to Russell's office, informing him of the teachers' plan. They, along with Nash, take the exams and change the answers. They arrive at the board's office, where they deliver the exams in time, saving Russell's career.

== Production ==
=== Development ===
In September 2017, HBO confirmed that the episode would be titled "The Most Popular Boy", and that it would be written by series co-creator Danny McBride, co-executive producer John Carcieri, and Hayes Davenport, and directed by executive producer David Gordon Green. This was McBride's fifteenth writing credit, Carcieri's fourteenth writing credit, Davenport's third writing credit, and Green's sixth directing credit.

== Reception ==
=== Viewers ===
In its original American broadcast, "The Most Popular Boy" was seen by an estimated 0.647 million household viewers with a 0.3 in the 18–49 demographics. This means that 0.3 percent of all households with televisions watched the episode. This was a slight decrease in viewership from the previous episode, which was watched by 0.700 million viewers with a 0.3 in the 18–49 demographics.

=== Critical reviews ===
"The Most Popular Boy" received extremely positive reviews from critics. Kyle Fowle of The A.V. Club gave the episode an "A" grade and wrote, "It was looking more and more like Gamby was, intentionally or not, gunning for Russell's job, and 'The Most Popular Boy' makes that explicit when Ms. Abbott turns more sinister than before, doing everything she can to oust Russell and position her new boyfriend as the next in line for the job."

Karen Han of Vulture gave the episode a 3 star rating out of 5 and wrote, "When it comes to Vice Principals, you have to trust the process. In season one, you had to trust that a story with white, racist, misogynist male protagonists would give way to something more than regressive politics. In this season, you have to trust that Gamby's hero arc won't end in a dramatic cop-out. So far, Vice Principals has been much more incisive than that, so as more and more narrative weight shifts to rooting for Gamby, I'm willing to put myself in Danny McBride and Jody Hill's hands." Nick Harley of Den of Geek gave the episode a 4 star rating out of 5 and wrote, "The best episodes of Vice Principals use the high school setting to place the adult cast of characters in adolescent scenarios. As they say, high school never ends, and even though we get older and mature, the allure of popularity as social currency persists long after graduation. Ugly behavior can rear its head in pursuit of acceptance, and Gamby falls victim to the pitfalls."
