= A Compassionate Man =

- Vice Principals episode
- Episode no.: Season 2 Episode 5
- Directed by: David Gordon Green
- Written by: Danny McBride; John Carcieri; Jeff Fradley
- Cinematography by: Michael Simmonds
- Editing by: Jeff Seibenick; Colin Patton
- Original release date: October 15, 2017
- Running time: 32 minutes

Guest appearances
- Brian Howe as Jeremy Haas; Susan Park as Christine Russell; Edi Patterson as Jen Abbott; Fisher Stevens as Brian Biehn; James M. Connor as Martin Seychelles; June Kyoto Lu as Mi Cha; Ashley Spillers as Janice Swift; Keong Sim as Kevin Yoom

Episode chronology
← Previous "Think Change"	Next → "The Most Popular Boy"

"A Compassionate Man" is the fifth episode of the second season of the American dark comedy television series Vice Principals. It is the fourteenth overall episode of the series and was written by series co-creator Danny McBride, co-executive producer John Carcieri, and Jeff Fradley, and directed by executive producer David Gordon Green. It was released on HBO on October 15, 2017.

The series follows the co-vice principals of North Jackson High School, Neal Gamby and Lee Russell, both of which are disliked for their personalities. When the principal decides to retire, an outsider named Dr. Belinda Brown is assigned to succeed him. This prompts Gamby and Russell to put aside their differences and team up to take her down. In the episode, Russell invites all teachers to his house for his birthday party, which descends into chaos.

According to Nielsen Media Research, the episode was seen by an estimated 0.700 million household viewers and gained a 0.3 ratings share among adults aged 18–49. The episode received extremely positive reviews from critics, who praised the absurdist humor, character development, performances and tone.

== Plot ==
During dinner, Russell (Walton Goggins) and Christine (Susan Park) are approached by Kevin, Christine's college boyfriend. On their drive home, Christine asks if Russell was involved in rumors that destroyed Kevin's reputation, which eventually led to their break-up, but Russell denies it.

Russell's birthday is approaching, so he invites all teachers to his house for a party. He tells Gamby (Danny McBride) to bring a date to make Snodgrass (Georgia King) jealous, as she will bring Brian (Fisher Stevens) with her. Instead, Gamby decides to invite Robin (Conner McVicker), disappointing Russell. To make things worse, Christine has invited Kevin to the party, making her question her marriage. Russell asks Nash (Dale Dickey) to kick Kevin out of the house, but he stays despite Nash's intimidation. As Robin walks through the house, he finds a disillusioned and drunk Christine in her master bedroom, and gets her to smoke marijuana with him.

Jealous at Snodgrass and Brian dancing, Gamby starts dancing with Abbott (Edi Patterson). Their dance is interrupted when Russell forces Gamby to improvise a toast because Christine is nowhere to be found. During Gamby's speech, Brian faints and diverts attention from Russell, who storms out. He goes to his master bedroom, shocked to discover that it was ramshackled, with his wedding photo defecated. He goes downstairs and confronts Robin, believing him to be responsible. However, Christine reveals that she was responsible, and confronts him over building their marriage on a lie. When Russell denies it, Christine takes a bat to destroy part of the house as well as Russell's car.

After the party ends, Gamby takes Robin and a drunk Abbott to their houses. He apologizes to Robin for not defending him from the accusation, and gives him $500 for going to the party. After dropping Robin off, Abbott throws up outside Gamby's car. She then reveals that she was responsible for Brian fainting, having drugged his drink. While Gamby is surprised, he actually thanks her and laughs with her. He decides to invite her to his house. Back at his house, Russell cleans up the mess and his wedding photo, while Christine sleeps.

== Production ==
=== Development ===
In September 2017, HBO confirmed that the episode would be titled "A Compassionate Man", and that it would be written by series co-creator Danny McBride, co-executive producer John Carcieri, and Jeff Fradley, and directed by executive producer David Gordon Green. This was McBride's fourteenth writing credit, Carcieri's thirteenth writing credit, Fradley's third writing credit, and Green's fifth directing credit.

== Reception ==
=== Viewers ===
In its original American broadcast, "A Compassionate Man" was seen by an estimated 0.700 million household viewers with a 0.3 in the 18–49 demographics. This means that 0.3 percent of all households with televisions watched the episode. This was a slight increase in viewership from the previous episode, which was watched by 0.654 million viewers with a 0.3 in the 18–49 demographics.

=== Critical reviews ===
"A Compassionate Man" received extremely positive reviews from critics. Kyle Fowle of The A.V. Club gave the episode an "A–" grade and wrote, "What's rather interesting about 'A Compassionate Man' is that Vice Principals continues to send Gamby and Russell down different paths. It's difficult to say that Gamby is some sort of truly reformed man but he's at least trying to move away from his past behavior and become someone better."

Karen Han of Vulture gave the episode a perfect 5 star rating out of 5 and wrote, "The party is a bombshell, and a particularly impressive one given the fact that it makes absolutely no headway as to what is ostensibly Vice Principals' main plot of figuring out who shot Gamby. But if this show has proven good at anything, it's setup. If this is what we're getting just halfway through the season, the payoff is guaranteed to be worth the wait." Nick Harley of Den of Geek wrote, "Vice Principals has been consistently upping its quality week after week by going down darker paths. The first season followed a similar trajectory, but for whatever reason, this year seems far more engaging. Perhaps it has something to do with getting used to the overall mean-spirited mood of the show. Or maybe I've sadly come to empathize with the monsters at the heart of this series."
