= End of the Line (Vice Principals) =

- Vice Principals episode
- Episode no.: Season 1 Episode 9
- Directed by: Jody Hill
- Written by: Danny McBride; John Carcieri
- Cinematography by: Eric Treml
- Editing by: Jeff Seibenick
- Original release date: September 18, 2016
- Running time: 29 minutes

Guest appearances
- Robin Bartlett as Octavia LeBlanc; Brian Howe as Jeremy Haas; Mike O'Gorman as Bill Hayden; Susan Park as Christine Russell; Edi Patterson as Jen Abbott; James M. Connor as Martin Seychelles; Maya G. Love as Janelle Gamby

Episode chronology
| ← Previous "Gin" | Next → "Tiger Town" |

"End of the Line" is the ninth episode and season finale of the first season of the American dark comedy television series Vice Principals. The episode was written by series co-creator Danny McBride and co-executive producer John Carcieri, and directed by series co-creator Jody Hill. It was released on HBO on September 18, 2016.

The series follows the co-vice principals of North Jackson High School, Neal Gamby and Lee Russell, both of whom are disliked for their personalities. When the principal decides to retire, an outsider named Dr. Belinda Brown is assigned to succeed him. This prompts Gamby and Russell to put aside their differences and team up to take her down. In the episode, Gamby and Russell make their final move against Brown in order to get the position of principals.

According to Nielsen Media Research, the episode was seen by an estimated 0.555 million household viewers and gained a 0.3 ratings share among adults aged 18–49. The episode received very positive reviews from critics, who praised the closure to Brown's storyline, humor, character development and ending.

== Plot ==
After locking Brown (Kimberly Hébert Gregory) in the bathroom, Gamby (Danny McBride) and Russell (Walton Goggins) leave the hotel. They then burn all their plans to hide their tracks.

The next day at school, Gamby and Russell plan their final move against Brown. They take her to train tracks where students supposedly use drugs, only to reveal their true nature. Russell shows her a video of all the chaos she committed while she was drunk. However, he starts confessing many of the things they did, including burning down her house. She brutally attacks them, until Russell threatens to upload the video. They tell her that she must quit her job, which she reluctantly accepts. While visiting Janelle (Maya G. Love) again in the horse track, Gamby talks with Ray (Shea Whigham). Ray admits that he often feels jealous of Gamby, because no matter what he does, he will still be Janelle's second option, which moves Gamby.

The next day, Gamby is informed that Brown has not been seen since the previous day, and Haas (Brian Howe) wants to meet with him and Russell. Before the meeting, both Gamby and Russell acknowledge that whoever gets chosen for the job, they will accept the result. Haas informs them that they will be temporary co-principals of the school, while the board decides on what to do next. That night, Janelle, Gale (Busy Philipps) and Ray surprise Gamby at his house to celebrate his promotion, where Ray gives him a hand-made knife with his name etched on the blade. Convinced by his talk with Ray, Gamby gives Janelle a new motor bike, wanting her to keep pursuing her passion.

After making their Pledge of Allegiance, Gamby and Russell freely walk through the school, with everyone now respecting them as their principals. Gamby visits Snodgrass (Georgia King), apologizing for his behavior, as he was feeling jealous about her relationship with Hayden (Mike O'Gorman). Snodgrass admits that while some teachers dislike Gamby, she still saw a better part of him, with Gamby promising to improve his life. They kiss, when they are interrupted by Swift (Ashley Spillers). Gamby's and Russell's cars have been engulfed in flames, with Gamby suspecting that Brown was involved. As he tries to put down the fire, a masked person in a black jacket approaches Gamby. The person takes out a gun and shoots Gamby twice before fleeing. The episode ends with Gamby on the ground next to his engulfed car.

== Production ==
=== Development ===
In August 2016, HBO confirmed that the episode would be titled "End of the Line", and that it would be written by series co-creator Danny McBride, and co-executive producer John Carcieri, and directed by series co-creator Jody Hill. This was McBride's ninth writing credit, Carcieri's eighth writing credit, and Hill's eighth directing credit.

== Reception ==
=== Viewers ===
In its original American broadcast, "End of the Line" was seen by an estimated 0.555 million household viewers with a 0.3 in the 18–49 demographics. This means that 0.3 percent of all households with televisions watched the episode. This was a 12% decrease in viewership from the previous episode, which was watched by 0.630 million viewers with a 0.3 in the 18–49 demographics.

=== Critical reviews ===
"End of the Line" received very positive reviews from critics. Kyle Fowle of The A.V. Club gave the episode a "B+" grade and wrote, "It's a surreal scene, and the tone is spot-on: it's both hilarious in its absurdity and totally frightening in execution. Vice Principals really couldn't end its first season on a better note, showing that while it has the capacity for a ton of empathy, it's also prepared to make a mess of everything. Bring on the crazy in season two."

Andrew Lapin of Vulture gave the episode a 3 star rating out of 5 and wrote, "Although the season ends with him lying in a pool of blood, it's pretty safe to say that he'll live. Will a brush with death make Neal Gamby a better man in the second season? Or will this just make him madder and dumber? Only time will tell."

Nick Harley of Den of Geek gave the episode a 3.5 star rating out of 5 and wrote, "Overall, Vice Principals has been solid, if unremarkable. The show's leads are enormously talented, and the character driven episodes in the heart of the season really justified the show’s existence, but there's still something that's off-putting about the series, and with so many other options in the era of Peak TV, season two of Vice Principals will have to do more to stand out if it wants to be head of the class." Jacob Hall of Esquire wrote, "For a show that has always shown a willingness to really go there, it's one hell of a way to end the season. Danny McBride getting gunned down in a high school parking lot by someone with an absurd costume is as funny as it is terrifying as it is shocking. That's this series in a nutshell."
