= The King (Vice Principals) =

- Vice Principals episode
- Episode no.: Season 2 Episode 3
- Directed by: David Gordon Green
- Written by: Danny McBride; John Carcieri; Adam Countee
- Cinematography by: Michael Simmonds
- Editing by: Justin Bourret; Todd Zelin
- Original release date: October 1, 2017
- Running time: 31 minutes

Guest appearances
- Mike O'Gorman as Bill Hayden; Susan Park as Christine Russell; Edi Patterson as Jen Abbott; Fisher Stevens as Brian Biehn; James M. Connor as Martin Seychelles; Marcuis Harris as Terrance Willows; Maya G. Love as Janelle Gamby; June Kyoto Lu as Mi Cha; Ashley Spillers as Janice Swift; Christopher Thornton as Mr. Milner

Episode chronology
← Previous "Slaughter"	Next → "Think Change"

"The King" is the third episode of the second season of the American dark comedy television series Vice Principals. It is the twelfth overall episode of the series and was written by series co-creator Danny McBride, co-executive producer John Carcieri, and Adam Countee, and directed by executive producer David Gordon Green. It was released on HBO on October 1, 2017.

The series follows the co-vice principals of North Jackson High School, Neal Gamby and Lee Russell, both of which are disliked for their personalities. When the principal decides to retire, an outsider named Dr. Belinda Brown is assigned to succeed him. This prompts Gamby and Russell to put aside their differences and team up to take her down. In the episode, Gamby stalks Snodgrass' new boyfriend, while Russell tries to find the person who made a dirty drawing of him.

According to Nielsen Media Research, the episode was seen by an estimated 0.892 million household viewers and gained a 0.3 ratings share among adults aged 18–49. The episode received positive reviews from critics, who praised the character development and humor, although some criticized the pacing.

== Plot ==
On the day Gamby (Danny McBride) was shot, Snodgrass (Georgia King) arrives at the hospital to check on him, claiming that she is his girlfriend. The doctor returns, stating she cannot be allowed as Gamby claims he has no girlfriend, confusing her.

Back in present day, Gamby tries to look for Robin (Conner McVicker), providing him with a special pass to avoid paying at the cafeteria. As Russell (Walton Goggins) introduces the new North Jackson teachers, he is disgusted to discover someone put a cruel drawing of him. Needing to find more information on the teachers, he assigns Gamby to replace Hayden's history class. Gamby struggles at teaching, with the students mocking his lack of information and having gone to an online university. He is also disheartened to discover that Snodgrass' boyfriend, Brian (Fisher Stevens), works at Penguin Press and could help publish Snodgrass' manuscript. He then corners Hayden (Mike O'Gorman) for information regarding Brian, discovering that he is a novelist whom she met during a lecture.

After buying a cabin to settle a base for investigation, Gamby mentions to Ray (Shea Whigham) that he is following Brian as a possible suspect in his shooting, given that he often traveled to many dangerous areas. He visits Brian at his college after class, pretending to be a detective, threatening him to stay away from Snodgrass. Nevertheless, Snodgrass finds out about Gamby's visit and confronts him at his office, informing him that she got her manuscript accepted and will be leaving for New York City for a meeting. When she confronts him about why he did not want to continue their relationship, Gamby states that he committed many bad things and was protecting her. Dismissing his claims, she states they wouldn't have worked anyway. In the school's restroom, Russell turns off the lights and assaults Mr. Milner (Christopher Thornton), the person responsible for the drawings.

== Production ==
=== Development ===
In September 2017, HBO confirmed that the episode would be titled "The King", and that it would be written by series co-creator Danny McBride, co-executive producer John Carcieri, and Adam Countee, and directed by executive producer David Gordon Green. This was McBride's twelfth writing credit, Carcieri's eleventh writing credit, Countee's second writing credit, and Green's third directing credit.

== Reception ==
=== Viewers ===
In its original American broadcast, "The King" was seen by an estimated 0.892 million household viewers with a 0.3 in the 18–49 demographics. This means that 0.3 percent of all households with televisions watched the episode. This was a 33% increase in viewership from the previous episode, which was watched by 0.670 million viewers with a 0.3 in the 18–49 demographics.

=== Critical reviews ===
"The King" received positive reviews from critics. Kyle Fowle of The A.V. Club gave the episode a "B–" grade and wrote, "After catching up with Gamby's recovery and bringing him back to a school that looked very different under Principal Lee Russell, it seemed like all the pieces were in place for the show to get ludicrous again. Unfortunately, 'The King' feels a lot like some of the placeholder episodes that defined the earliest parts of season one, never quite finding its footing or doing much to move the story along in any meaningful way."

Karen Han of Vulture gave the episode a 4 star rating out of 5 and wrote, "It's an intrinsically dark tone to strike, and telling as to the long-term game that McBride & Co. were playing when they set Vice Principals up as a two-season arc. These people are destroying each other and themselves in an attempt to take back legitimacy that they never really earned, and it's a cycle that's digging them further and further into the ground. Sound at all familiar?" Nick Harley of Den of Geek gave the episode a 4 star rating out of 5 and wrote, "The unlikely pairing of Gamby and Amanda Snodgrass was both totally devoid of real-life logic but incredibly funny to watch evolve into an actual relationship. However, season two of Vice Principals commits to its dark trajectory and breaks the pair up immediately, with Gamby leaning into the drama of his accident and petulantly dismissing his girlfriend."
