= Tiger Town (Vice Principals) =

- Vice Principals episode
- Episode no.: Season 2 Episode 1
- Directed by: David Gordon Green
- Written by: Danny McBride; John Carcieri; Tim Saccardo
- Cinematography by: Michael Simmons
- Editing by: Justin Bourret
- Original release date: September 17, 2017
- Running time: 31 minutes

Guest appearances
- Robin Bartlett as Octavia LeBlanc; Brian Howe as Jeremy Haas; Mike O'Gorman as Bill Hayden; Susan Park as Christine Russell; Edi Patterson as Jen Abbott; James M. Connor as Martin Seychelles; RJ Cyler as Luke Brown; Marcuis Harris as Terrance Willows; Brian Tyree Henry as Dascious Brown; Maya G. Love as Janelle Gamby; June Kyoto Lu as Mi Cha; Ashley Spillers as Janice Swift

Episode chronology
← Previous "End of the Line"	Next → "Slaughter"

"Tiger Town" is the first episode of the second season of the American dark comedy television series Vice Principals. It is the tenth overall episode of the series and was written by series co-creator Danny McBride, co-executive producer John Carcieri, and Tim Saccardo, and directed by executive producer David Gordon Green. It was released on HBO on September 17, 2017.

The series follows the co-vice principals of North Jackson High School, Neal Gamby and Lee Russell, both of whom are disliked for their personalities. When the principal decides to retire, an outsider named Dr. Belinda Brown is assigned to succeed him. This prompts Gamby and Russell to put aside their differences and team up to take her down. In the episode, Gamby returns to North Jackson, which has changed a lot since his shooting.

According to Nielsen Media Research, the episode was seen by an estimated 0.711 million household viewers and gained a 0.3 ratings share among adults aged 18–49. The episode received very positive reviews from critics, who praised the new set-up, character development and humor.

== Plot ==
After recovering from his wounds, Gamby (Danny McBride) is now living with Ray (Shea Whigham), Gale (Busy Philipps) and Janelle (Maya G. Love), per Ray's suggestion. He constantly abuses his use of a wheelchair and stair lift, and is also doing his own investigation of his shooter, deducing that Brown (Kimberly Hébert Gregory) was responsible. To protect himself, he has armed a sleeve gun.

Russell (Walton Goggins) visits Gamby, convincing him that he needs to stand up and go back to his normal life. Gamby returns to North Jackson with a cane, managing to sneak his sleeve gun through a metal detector. Gamby is forced to assist to a ceremony honoring, and is also taken aback by the amount of changes in the school, particularly the addition of the new vice principal, Nash (Dale Dickey). He also reunites with Snodgrass (Georgia King), although she is hurtful that he never contacted her after regaining consciousness. Gamby confronts Swift (Ashley Spillers) for Brown's whereabouts, with Swift confirming that she moved to Gastonia. After getting her address, he follows her to a restaurant where he confronts her at the bathroom. She claims she was not involved in his shooting, stating she moved on past him and Russell. She also theorizes that Russell may be involved, given that he was the only one unscathed and kept the position of principal.

The next day, Gamby confronts Russell at the woods, accusing him of foul play. Russell angrily rebuffs his claims, claiming that while he may be in charge, he does not enjoy the position. He also admits that with his access to records, he has built a list of possible suspects that may have targeted Gamby. Gamby goes to the cafeteria, just as Nash is scolding a student for playing music. Gamby uses his cane to destroy the music player, gets rid of the cane and proudly announces that he is back and violation of rules will not be tolerated.

== Production ==
=== Development ===
In August 2017, HBO confirmed that the episode would be titled "Tiger Town", and that it would be written by series co-creator Danny McBride, co-executive producer John Carcieri, and Tim Saccardo, and directed by executive producer David Gordon Green. This was McBride's tenth writing credit, Carcieri's ninth writing credit, Saccardo's second writing credit, and Green's first directing credit.

== Reception ==
=== Viewers ===
In its original American broadcast, "Tiger Town" was seen by an estimated 0.711 million household viewers with a 0.3 in the 18–49 demographics. This means that 0.3 percent of all households with televisions watched the episode. This was a 28% increase in viewership from the previous episode, which was watched by 0.555 million viewers with a 0.3 in the 18–49 demographics.

=== Critical reviews ===
"Tiger Town" received very positive reviews from critics. Kyle Fowle of The A.V. Club gave the episode a "B+" grade and wrote, "In essence, 'Tiger Town' is a promising start to the season. It's raunchy, hilarious, and boasts a narrative throughline that keeps everything grounded. On top of that, it assures us that there's no end in sight to the absurdity; a power play between Russell and Gamby may be looming, and that's bound to push these characters to new extremes. If you found yourself on Vice Principals' unique, challenging wavelength last season, 'Tiger Town' suggests that you will be again."

Karen Han of Vulture gave the episode a 3 star rating out of 5 and wrote, "After watching Nash struggle to get some students to turn a boom box down, Gamby takes matters into his own hands, seizing his Braveheart moment by smashing the boom box to pieces. 'I'm back,' he declares, 'and I'm ready to put my foot inside someone's ass!' Looks like school is back in session." Nick Harley of Den of Geek gave the episode a 3.5 star rating out of 5 and wrote, "This premiere episode is an effective way to reinsert Gamby into a school ecosystem that's felt his absence. McBride is as funny as ever, delivering lines that no teacher would ever dare utter with hilarious venom, and Walton Goggins shines as the cattiest administrator in the South. Director David Gordon Green injects some style into the episode, shooting the proceedings in the visual language of a revenge thriller."
