= Slaughter (Vice Principals) =

- Vice Principals episode
- Episode no.: Season 2 Episode 2
- Directed by: David Gordon Green
- Written by: Danny McBride; John Carcieri; Ben Dougan
- Cinematography by: Michael Simmonds
- Editing by: Jeff Seibenick; Todd Zelin
- Original release date: September 24, 2017
- Running time: 31 minutes

Guest appearances
- Robin Bartlett as Octavia LeBlanc; Mike O'Gorman as Bill Hayden; Susan Park as Christine Russell; Edi Patterson as Jen Abbott; Fisher Stevens as Brian Biehn; James M. Connor as Martin Seychelles; Marcuis Harris as Terrance Willows; Maya G. Love as Janelle Gamby; June Kyoto Lu as Mi Cha; Ashley Spillers as Janice Swift

Episode chronology
← Previous "Tiger Town"	Next → "The King"

"Slaughter" is the second episode of the second season of the American dark comedy television series Vice Principals. It is the eleventh overall episode of the series and was written by series co-creator Danny McBride, co-executive producer John Carcieri, and Ben Dougan, and directed by executive producer David Gordon Green. It was released on HBO on September 24, 2017.

The series follows the co-vice principals of North Jackson High School, Neal Gamby and Lee Russell, both of which are disliked for their personalities. When the principal decides to retire, an outsider named Dr. Belinda Brown is assigned to succeed him. This prompts Gamby and Russell to put aside their differences and team up to take her down. In the episode, Gamby is still looking for the shooter, suspecting that a former student whom he expelled might be responsible. Meanwhile, Russell tries to build a good relationship with the rest of the teachers.

According to Nielsen Media Research, the episode was seen by an estimated 0.670 million household viewers and gained a 0.3 ratings share among adults aged 18–49. The episode received positive reviews from critics, who praised the humor, character development and performances.

== Plot ==
Gamby (Danny McBride) has been trying to find the shooter, making security guards inspect many possible suspects' lockers, to no success. To help find any connection, Russell (Walton Goggins) has installed a bug in the teachers' room to spy on them. During a conversation, Gamby finds that Snodgrass (Georgia King) may be romantically involved with a man named Brian.

Gamby suspects Robin Shandrell, a former student whom he expelled for selling drugs, may be his shooter. He and Nash (Dale Dickey) spy on Robin, who quickly discovers them. He claims he was not involved, and even accuses Gamby of planting drugs on his locker to frame him. Nash tries to grab him, causing Robin to punch her in the face. Meanwhile, Russell is devastated to see that the teachers speak badly of him. Christine (Susan Park) suggests that he should try to be nicer to get more respect. The next day, he brings a cook to prepare sushi, but the teachers are not remotely interested. LeBlanc (Robin Bartlett) mocks Russell as he only got to be principal because the previous one left, causing Russell to pour sushi over the table and storm out.

With no police back-up, Gamby sneaks into Robin's house while Russell distracts Robin in the living room. Robin kicks Russell out of his house while Gamby hides in a closet. He sees that Robin is taking care of his very ill grandfather, making him change his mind. At night, he tells Russell that he planted drugs in Robin's locker to expel him and now feels guilty if he ruined his life. The next day, Russell summons all the teachers (except Snodgrass) to the train tracks, informing them that they are all fired. He then takes their teacher IDs and burns them in a trash can, and also has Gamby do the same to Hayden (Mike O'Gorman). Gamby later visits Robin at his factory, offering him a chance to return to high school, which he accepts. He also gives Dayshawn (Sheaun McKinney) a glass box with their faces, to thank him for finding his body. However, Gamby is disappointed when he sees Snodgrass leaving with a man (Fisher Stevens) in a fancy car.

== Production ==
=== Development ===
In August 2017, HBO confirmed that the episode would be titled "Slaughter", and that it would be written by series co-creator Danny McBride, co-executive producer John Carcieri, and Ben Dougan, and directed by executive producer David Gordon Green. This was McBride's eleventh writing credit, Carcieri's tenth writing credit, Dougan's second writing credit, and Green's second directing credit.

== Reception ==
=== Viewers ===
In its original American broadcast, "Slaughter" was seen by an estimated 0.670 million household viewers with a 0.3 in the 18–49 demographics. This means that 0.3 percent of all households with televisions watched the episode. This was a slight decrease in viewership from the previous episode, which was watched by 0.711 million viewers with a 0.3 in the 18–49 demographics.

=== Critical reviews ===
"Slaughter" received positive reviews from critics. Kyle Fowle of The A.V. Club gave the episode a "B" grade and wrote, "Sending Gamby and Russell in two different directions could prove fruitful. 'Slaughter' isn't quite as funny or biting as the season premiere, but it does serve as an episode that sets up the conflicts for the rest of the season."

Karen Han of Vulture gave the episode a 3 star rating out of 5 and wrote, "This time last season, Neal Gamby and Lee Russell were burning down a house. To some, the sequence represented the worst of the show, as, through sheer bombast, Vice Principals was celebrating the ransacking and subsequent arson of a black woman's home. This second season has stripped away a lot of that illusion, leaving behind a show that's much obviously darker and even more uncomfortable to watch. There's a fire in this episode, too, but it's impossible to interpret as a triumph." Nick Harley of Den of Geek gave the episode a 3.5 star rating out of 5 and wrote, "Neal Gamby is on a warpath for revenge. Looking for his shooter, it's likely that Gamby is going to slip further into the darkness that his little vigilante act brings out. Combining his normal, morally grey and often reprehensible behavior with a thirst for vengeance is the recipe for a monster. Thankfully, this week Vice Principals decides to show the conscious that's still lurking in Gamby even as his paranoia and suspicion grow."
