= The Union of the Wizard & The Warrior =

- Vice Principals episode
- Episode no.: Season 2 Episode 9
- Directed by: David Gordon Green
- Written by: Danny McBride; John Carcieri; Jeff Fradley
- Cinematography by: Michael Simmonds
- Editing by: Justin Bourret
- Original release date: November 12, 2017
- Running time: 33 minutes

Guest appearances
- Steve Little as Vice Principal Miggs; Edi Patterson as Jen Abbott; James M. Connor as Martin Seychelles; Marcuis Harris as Terrance Willows; Maya G. Love as Janelle Gamby; Brad Beyer as Tiger Trainer; Ashley Spillers as Janice Swift; Christopher Thornton as Mr. Milner

Episode chronology
← Previous "Venetian Nights"	Next → —

"The Union of the Wizard & The Warrior" is the series finale of the American dark comedy television series Vice Principals. It is the ninth episode of the second season and is the 18th overall episode of the series. The episode was written by series co-creator Danny McBride, co-executive producer John Carcieri, and Jeff Fradley, and directed by executive producer David Gordon Green. It was released on HBO on November 12, 2017.

The series follows the co-vice principals of North Jackson High School, Neal Gamby and Lee Russell, both of which are disliked for their personalities. When the principal decides to retire, an outsider named Dr. Belinda Brown is assigned to succeed him. This prompts Gamby and Russell to put aside their differences and team up to take her down. After taking her down, both are promoted to co-principals, when Gamby is shot by an unknown assailant. The second season revolves around Gamby's search for the shooter, suspecting that Russell may be the prime suspect. In the episode, Gamby is now principal of North Jackson while Russell tries to prove his innocence.

According to Nielsen Media Research, the episode was seen by an estimated 0.792 million household viewers and gained a 0.4 ratings share among adults aged 18–49. The episode received critical acclaim, with critics praising the directing, performances, humor, themes, and tone, deeming it as a fitting closure to the series.

== Plot ==
It is the end of the school year, and Gamby (Danny McBride), now principal of North Jackson, delivers a speech on the student television station broadcast. He specifically congratulates Robin (Conner McVicker), who managed to keep perfect grades in the last few months. While Gamby has his dream job and is now dating Snodgrass (Georgia King), he is still haunted by his shooting earlier in the year by an unknown assailant.

Dr. Brown (Kimberly Hébert Gregory), now working at a private school, is approached by Russell (Walton Goggins). He returns the high-heeled shoe she lost on the train tracks the day they forced her to resign, telling her he's sorry for his behavior and wants help in proving his innocence. Brown angrily dismisses his request, and leaves. As he prepares for the graduation, Gamby finds Abbott (Edi Patterson) at his cabin wearing a wedding dress. She wants to marry him, but Gamby tells her that it will not happen and apologizes for his behavior. While she uses his bathroom, Russell arrives, to Gamby's chagrin.

Russell has concluded that Abbott shot Gamby, then framed him for the crime by planting the mask worn that day in his car, when the two pals went on vacation. Abbott reappears from the cabin brandishing a gun and shoots Russell in the head, to Gamby's shock. Before she moves to shoot Gamby as well as herself, he convinces her to take them to the "perfect place" in the woods to die together. He leads her to one of his previously-constructed security traps but it backfires, forcing him to run. He inadvertently falls into a hidden, spiked ditch he also previously built. Fortunately, Abbott has run out of bullets and leaves him to die, signaling her intention to kill Ms. Snodgrass back at the school. After she leaves Russell is revealed to still be alive and helps Gamby escape the ditch and rush back to the school. Meanwhile, Abbott is on the school grounds and finds Snodgrass in the women's bathroom where she brutally attacks her with a parking pole. Snodgrass eventually gains the upper hand and knocks her unconscious with it.

As she reunites with school staffers and the just-arriving Gamby and Russell, Abbott releases a live tiger mascot rented by Russell to celebrate graduation day. Roaming the main hall it attacks and kills its malevolent trainer. As the staff make their escape, Snodgrass locks Abbott in the tiger's cage and the feline is secured in the main hall via a security gate closure. Gamby interrupts the graduation ceremony to inform all attendees to evacuate. Meanwhile, Abbott is able to use a mop to reach and activate a fire alarm, which unlocks the main hall and allows the tiger to walk free. Encountering the tiger, Russell tries a technique to calm the animal, but he ends up with his right hand being mauled. Gamby reenters the school, finding a wounded Russell on the floor. He laments the situation, but both reaffirm their friendship. When the tiger reappears, Gamby stands in front of Russell and lets loose with a mighty roar, which causes the tiger to back off. Gamby carries his comatose friend out of the building. He's immediately taken to a waiting ambulance while Abbott is arrested and put into a squad car. Looking out the window of the vehicle, she breaks into an evil grin as she watches the EMT check for signs of life over a motionless Russell.

Three months later, Gamby drops off his daughter Janelle (Maya G. Love) at North Jackson High for her first day, and we see Nash (Dale Dickey) is now the principal. Gamby arrives at Forest Hills Middle School as its new principal, where he meets his vice principal, Miggs (Steve Little, who had previously starred alongside McBride in Eastbound & Down). Russell is seen working as a boutique manager in the town mall. Snodgrass had her book The Union of the Wizard & The Warrior published, including cover art clearly inspired by Gamby and Russell. She's doing an in-house reading at the mall bookstore, and Gamby is happily seated in the audience. As they celebrate afterwards by grabbing a meal in the mall food court, Gamby looks up and spots Russell at a nearby table, soda in hand. They exchange silent glances and nods. When Gamby looks over again, Russell's chair is empty. When he takes another look, the entire table is vacant. A knowing smile crosses his face.

== Production ==
=== Development ===
Since the project was ordered, Danny McBride said that the series would end after two seasons. McBride explained, "I think I had been burned by too many TV shows that I invested in, where they started out great, and then, with each season, stuff changed, cast members left, and ultimately, at the end of the day, you don't know if you saw the completed thing that the original creators had in mind. So we wanted to create a show that finality to it, that had a beginning, middle, and end, and give people a complete story."

In October 2017, HBO confirmed that the finale would be titled "The Union of the Wizard & The Warrior", and that it would be written by series co-creator Danny McBride, co-executive producer John Carcieri, and Jeff Fradley, and directed by executive producer David Gordon Green. This was McBride's eighteenth writing credit, Carcieri's seventeenth writing credit, Fradley's sixth writing credit, and Green's eighth directing credit.

=== Writing ===
The show never intended to kill Russell, with McBride explaining, "I think it's almost a better punishment for him to have to really look at how far he's fallen and to try to move forward." The reveal of Abbott as the shooter was also decided before the series even started filming, but Edi Patterson and the cast were not informed until the second season.

The fate of Gamby and Russell was described by McBride as "they both had compromised themselves too much to be the rightful inheritor of that position", which meant that both would not be the principals of the school. For Gamby, he wanted to prove that the character would not have his life shifted with the position, while Russell's search for power gave him a happy ending "because he's been able to hold onto that small power and just put it into another industry, which is female fashions." McBride did not want to depict redemption to the characters, saying "we held off on totally redeeming them because I'm not sure these guys are totally redeemable. I think they probably still have a bit more of a price to pay. You just hope that they’re going to keep trying to go in the right direction."

Regarding a message for the finale and the series in general, McBride explained, "I do think there's a hopeful message there, but at the end of the day we're not really connecting all the dots. So who's to say that Lee Russell's not going to get himself into just as much trouble as he has before, or that Gamby won't find himself giving in to his worst impulses. But I think in this particular point of time, these two men helped each other in an odd, strange, fucked-up way, and they acknowledge that they ended up finding a bit of solace from someone who initially seemed like an enemy."

=== Filming ===
The series used a real tiger in the episode. In contrast to its depiction, the tiger was actually friendly on set, with the attack sequences being added in post-production.

== Reception ==
=== Viewers ===
In its original American broadcast, "The Union of the Wizard & The Warrior" was seen by an estimated 0.792 million household viewers with a 0.4 in the 18–49 demographics. This means that 0.4 percent of all households with televisions watched the episode. This was a 29% increase in viewership from the previous episode, which was watched by 0.610 million viewers with a 0.3 in the 18–49 demographics.

=== Critical reviews ===
"The Union of the Wizard & The Warrior" received critical acclaim. Kyle Fowle of The A.V. Club gave the episode an "A" grade and wrote, "In its own weird way, Vice Principals is a map for navigating the messiness of human nature and the feeling that we're all growing increasingly divided from one another. In essence, a show that understands that while nobody's perfect, if you're working towards being somebody better, you're on the right track."

Karen Han of Vulture gave the episode a perfect 5 star rating out of 5 and wrote, "Maybe it's too hopeful or too forgiving an ending, but it's a fantasy I'm willing to indulge in, and if you've stuck with the show this long, I think you will be, too. Now, if you'll excuse me, I'm going to go watch it all again." Ben Travers of IndieWire gave the episode a "B+" grade and wrote, "The final season, final episode, and final scene of Vice Principals focused on the platonic romance between Gamby and Lee. As the two men's eyes met in the mall cafeteria, drifted apart, and then Lee disappeared, that last note perfectly encapsulates the show overall: bittersweet."

Nick Harley of Den of Geek gave the episode a 4 star rating out of 5 and wrote, "I was hoping Vice Principals would have delivered a bigger message on the topics it broached, but I guess there's nothing wrong with settling for being dark, unapologetic, and most importantly, funny." Emily St. James of Vox wrote, "If you find it a little strange that the show more or less ends with Gamby getting everything he wanted, from a principalship to the girl, well, I can't deny that this is literally what happens. Or maybe you find the show's 'happy' ending to be something worth celebrating. The larger point is that Vice Principals wants to leave you feeling at least somewhat conflicted about everything that happens."

In a more mixed review, Darren Franich of Entertainment Weekly gave the episode a "B–" grade and wrote, "Sunday's series finale matched the theatrics, but I worry that the show wimped out a bit. You wanted anarchy, and you got a bromance, a sense that all could be forgiven, so maybe nothing much really mattered."
