= Venetian Nights (Vice Principals) =

- Vice Principals episode
- Episode no.: Season 2 Episode 8
- Directed by: Danny McBride
- Written by: Danny McBride; John Carcieri; Jeff Fradley
- Cinematography by: Michael Simmonds
- Editing by: Jeff Seibenick
- Original release date: November 5, 2017
- Running time: 35 minutes

Guest appearances
- Brian Howe as Jeremy Haas; Susan Park as Christine Russell; Edi Patterson as Jen Abbott; James M. Connor as Martin Seychelles; Marcuis Harris as Terrance Willows; Maya G. Love as Janelle Gamby; June Kyoko Lu as Mi Cha; Ashley Spillers as Janice Swift; Christopher Thornton as Mr. Milner

Episode chronology
← Previous "Spring Break"	Next → "The Union of the Wizard & The Warrior"

"Venetian Nights" is the eighth episode of the second season of the American dark comedy television series Vice Principals. It is the seventeenth overall episode of the series and was written by series co-creator Danny McBride, co-executive producer John Carcieri, and Jeff Fradley, and directed by McBride. It was released on HBO on November 5, 2017.

The series follows the co-vice principals of North Jackson High School, Neal Gamby and Lee Russell, both of which are disliked for their personalities. When the principal decides to retire, an outsider named Dr. Belinda Brown is assigned to succeed him. This prompts Gamby and Russell to put aside their differences and team up to take her down. In the episode, Gamby decides to confront Russell over his lies.

According to Nielsen Media Research, the episode was seen by an estimated 0.610 million household viewers and gained a 0.3 ratings share among adults aged 18–49. The episode received extremely positive reviews from critics, who praised the humor, character development, tension and performances.

== Plot ==
Haas (Brian Howe) announces that the school's results from the test were the best in the whole state, surprising the teachers and delighting Russell (Walton Goggins). He then brings all the teachers on stage to "congratulate" them, by making them more reachable to students and making them chaperones of their upcoming senior prom.

Russell meets with Gamby (Danny McBride) at the train tracks. Gamby pulls out his sleeve gun, confronting him over shooting him, which Russell denies. Gamby tells Russell to resign to the board, or he will kill him the next day. Russell leaves the school, and Gamby informs Ray (Shea Whigham), Gale (Busy Philipps) and Janelle (Maya G. Love) that he closed the case, although he does not disclose the shooter. The next day, however, Russell shows up to work, dismissing Gamby's threat. Gamby informs Nash (Dale Dickey) and Terrance (Marcuis Harris), but they don't believe him either. He then asks Snodgrass (Georgia King) to trust him by revealing that he burned down Brown's house to help Russell, causing her to leave him.

Angry at their treatment, Abbott (Edi Patterson) reveals to the teachers that Gamby is still friends with Russell. Gamby tries to claim that he is planning something, but they once again dislike him. He then decides to confront Russell in his office with the sleeve gun, but finds himself unable to pull the trigger. Russell then fires Gamby for trying to kill him. He leaves the school, but decides to return and brutally attacks Russell during a student television station broadcast. Their fight extends throughout the school, causing much destruction, only ending when Terrance and Nash intercept Gamby and take him out of the school, humiliating him in front of everyone.

That night, Snodgrass visits Gamby at home, telling him that while he has a dark past, she knows he wants to rectify his mistakes. They meet with Christine (Susan Park) and Mi Cha (June Kyoto Lu), convincing them that they will take him down. Mi Cha directs them to Russell's storage unit, where he keeps records. Christine provides them with a diary belonging to Russell's sisters, which contains the only way to defeat him. The next day, Gamby and Snodgrass summon teachers, cafeteria workers and bullies led by Robin (Conner McVicker) to the woods, convincing them that they can use the diary for their advantage.

On the "Venetian Nights" senior prom, the bullies corner Russell and lock him in a storage room. There, Gamby appears with the diary and reads aloud some of Russell's embarrassing and evil actions, threatening to read it through the sound system to all the school unless he resigns. With no option, Russell signs his resignation and leaves. Gamby joins Snodgrass in the prom, where they kiss and dance. As Russell stays defeated outside, Abbott angrily stares at Gamby and Snodgrass dancing.

== Production ==
=== Development ===
In October 2017, HBO confirmed that the episode would be titled "Venetian Nights", and that it would be written by series co-creator Danny McBride, co-executive producer John Carcieri, and Jeff Fradley, and directed by McBride. This was McBride's seventeenth writing credit, Carcieri's sixteenth writing credit, Fradley's fifth writing credit, and McBride's second directing credit.

== Reception ==
=== Viewers ===
In its original American broadcast, "Venetian Nights" was seen by an estimated 0.610 million household viewers with a 0.3 in the 18–49 demographics. This means that 0.3 percent of all households with televisions watched the episode. This was a slight increase in viewership from the previous episode, which was watched by 0.604 million viewers with a 0.2 in the 18–49 demographics.

=== Critical reviews ===
"Venetian Nights" received extremely positive reviews from critics. Kyle Fowle of The A.V. Club gave the episode an "A" grade and wrote, "there may be no better string of scenes across the show's two season, and perhaps in any half-hour comedy this year, than the ones that make up the first half of 'Venetian Nights'."

Karen Han of Vulture gave the episode a 4 star rating out of 5 and wrote, "If you like stories with happy endings, put on a set of blinders and pretend this is the last episode of Vice Principals. 'Venetian Nights' plays almost like a dream: The prince, confronted by a great evil, tries to defeat it, only to be cast out from his own kingdom. But then, with the help of the townsfolk who also resent the evil's reign, he returns to cast it out for good and get the girl. It's a nice ending, except for the fact that the story isn't quite over. And if the rest of the show is anything to go by, I can't imagine that it's gonna be pretty." Nick Harley of Den of Geek gave the episode a perfect 5 star rating out of 5 and wrote, "Season 2 of Vice Principals has been a vast improvement overall, but it hasn't been more apparent than in this episode. Expertly paced, tense yet silly, and impressively stylized, episodes like this will make me Vice Principals dearly once it concludes next week. With likely one more battle left in the war between VPs, I'm certain Vice Principals will go out with quite a large bang."
