= Gin (Vice Principals) =

- Vice Principals episode
- Episode no.: Season 1 Episode 8
- Directed by: Jody Hill
- Written by: Danny McBride; John Carcieri; Tim Saccardo
- Cinematography by: Eric Treml
- Editing by: Jeff Seibenick; Todd Zelin
- Original release date: September 11, 2016
- Running time: 30 minutes

Guest appearances
- Mike O'Gorman as Bill Hayden; Susan Park as Christine Russell; Edi Patterson as Jen Abbott; RJ Cyler as Luke Brown; Brian Tyree Henry as Dascious Brown; Maya G. Love as Janelle Gamby; June Kyoto Lu as Mi Cha

Episode chronology
← Previous "The Good Book"	Next → "End of the Line"

"Gin" is the eighth episode of the first season of the American dark comedy television series Vice Principals. The episode was written by series co-creator Danny McBride, co-executive producer John Carcieri, and Tim Saccardo, and directed by series co-creator Jody Hill. It was released on HBO on September 11, 2016.

The series follows the co-vice principals of North Jackson High School, Neal Gamby and Lee Russell, both of which are disliked for their personalities. When the principal decides to retire, an outsider named Dr. Belinda Brown is assigned to succeed him. This prompts Gamby and Russell to put aside their differences and team up to take her down. In the episode, Gamby is offered the chance of being sole vice principal, but it will cost Russell's job.

According to Nielsen Media Research, the episode was seen by an estimated 0.630 million household viewers and gained a 0.3 ratings share among adults aged 18–49. The episode received positive reviews from critics, who praised the episode's balance of comedy and drama, as well as the character development.

== Plot ==
After having sex with Snodgrass (Georgia King) in a school bus, Gamby (Danny McBride) sends many students to detention for drinking alcohol, banning them from performing at the yearly holiday concert. He meets with Brown (Kimberly Hébert Gregory), who tells him that she is considering making him sole vice principal with a higher salary. She also reveals that she intends to fire Russell (Walton Goggins), and lets him consider it.

While dining with her family, Brown is told by Dascious (Brian Tyree Henry) that he and the children talked about moving back to Philadelphia. Seeing they talked without consulting it with her, she tells them to leave, which they do later that night. Gamby has spent more time with Janelle (Maya G. Love), who has decided to abandon motocross, often taking her on dates with him and Snodgrass. Feeling jealous, Abbott (Edi Patterson) confronts Gamby at the cafeteria, telling her that Snodgrass is only having sex with him to make Hayden (Mike O'Gorman) jealous. Furious at the revelation, he confronts Snodgrass, informing her that he also had sex with Abbott. Amidst their argument, they decide to take time off.

Gamby visits Russell at his house for advice, and surprisingly gets a heartfelt motivation. He reveals that Brown is considering firing him and wanted him to take the decision. Russell tells him to fire him, but Gamby decides to take one last chance in taking her down. After the holiday concert, Gamby takes Brown to dinner to discuss her offer. Unbeknownst to Brown, Gamby is carrying a pen with a camera designed by Russell. Brown opens up about her children's departure, breaking down in tears. Although a teetotaler, she binge drinks alcohol until she is kicked out. Russell joins them and uses the pen to film all her actions, including peeing on a police cruiser. They take her to her hotel room, but she attacks them just as they leave. They fight until they manage to lock her inside her bathroom.

== Production ==
=== Development ===
In August 2016, HBO confirmed that the episode would be titled "Gin", and that it would be written by series co-creator Danny McBride, co-executive producer John Carcieri, and Tim Saccardo, and directed by series co-creator Jody Hill. This was McBride's eighth writing credit, Carcieri's seventh writing credit, Saccardo's first writing credit, and Hill's seventh directing credit.

== Reception ==
=== Viewers ===
In its original American broadcast, "Gin" was seen by an estimated 0.630 million household viewers with a 0.3 in the 18–49 demographics. This means that 0.3 percent of all households with televisions watched the episode. This was a slight increase in viewership from the previous episode, which was watched by 0.620 million viewers with a 0.3 in the 18–49 demographics.

=== Critical reviews ===
"Gin" received positive reviews from critics. Kyle Fowle of The A.V. Club gave the episode a "B+" grade and wrote, "'Gin' strikes the comedy/drama balance perfectly. It's an episode that's all about how we deal with being overwhelmed in our homes and our jobs while constantly wondering whether we're one of the good guys. What's intriguing about 'Gin' is the way it establishes the mindset of the main characters, allowing us peeks into how they deal with their own shifting perspectives and sense of who they are."

Nick Harley of Den of Geek gave the episode a 3.5 star rating out of 5 and wrote, "The fallout from Dr. Brown's big night out will certainly create enough waves to sustain the finale next week." Jacob Hall of Esquire wrote, "Amanda Snodgrass is right — there are flashes of a very different Neal Gamby in 'Gin', the penultimate episode of Vice Principals first season. Against all odds, Danny McBride has taken a character built around his usual persona (a loudmouth, vile, egotistical buffoon) and slowly revealed a depth that nobody saw coming. Upon first glance, vice principal Gamby is Kenny Powers 2.0, but after spending so many half hours with him, we know better."
