= Think Change =

- Vice Principals episode
- Episode no.: Season 2 Episode 4
- Directed by: David Gordon Green
- Written by: Danny McBride; John Carcieri; Jeff Fradley
- Cinematography by: Michael Simmonds
- Editing by: Jeff Seibenick; Todd Zelin
- Original release date: October 8, 2017
- Running time: 31 minutes

Guest appearances
- Scott Caan as Sweat Dogs Trainer; Nancy Linehan Charles as June Russell; Brian Howe as Jeremy Haas; Susan Park as Christine Russell; Edi Patterson as Jen Abbott; James M. Connor as Martin Seychelles; Marcuis Harris as Terrance Willows; Emily Johnson as Lacey Russell; June Kyoto Lu as Mi Cha; Ashley Spillers as Janice Swift; Christopher Thornton as Mr. Milner; Breeda Wool as Lynn Russell

Episode chronology
← Previous "The King"	Next → "A Compassionate Man"

"Think Change" is the fourth episode of the second season of the American dark comedy television series Vice Principals. It is the thirteenth overall episode of the series and was written by series co-creator Danny McBride, co-executive producer John Carcieri, and Jeff Fradley, and directed by executive producer David Gordon Green. It was released on HBO on October 8, 2017.

The series follows the co-vice principals of North Jackson High School, Neal Gamby and Lee Russell, both of which are disliked for their personalities. When the principal decides to retire, an outsider named Dr. Belinda Brown is assigned to succeed him. This prompts Gamby and Russell to put aside their differences and team up to take her down. In the episode, Gamby is left in charge as principal while Russell leaves for his father's funeral.

According to Nielsen Media Research, the episode was seen by an estimated 0.654 million household viewers and gained a 0.3 ratings share among adults aged 18–49. The episode received very positive reviews from critics, who praised the character development, performances and humor.

== Plot ==
Russell (Walton Goggins) has all the teachers take part of a new fitness program in the school, where the instructors use a "think change" strategy to overcome challenges. During this, he is called by Christine (Susan Park), informing him that his father has died. While he did not have the best relationship with his father, he leaves for the funeral, leaving Gamby (Danny McBride) as the interim principal.

Russell arrives for the funeral, where it is clear that he does not get along with his sisters Lacey (Emily Johnson) and Lynn (Breeda Wool), who mock him and humiliate him by pulling down his pants in the garage. Russell is not respected among his family, as he abandoned them and avoided contact, proven by the fact that he is not aware that his mother June (Nancy Linehan Charles) may be going to a retirement home. During the eulogy, Russell speaks about his relationship with his family, which moves his family. He ignores his sisters' mockery and makes amends with her mother. Before leaving, he destroys his childhood toys, as they were intended to be given to his nephews.

Gamby's day as principal does not go as well as expected, as he struggles with decisions and is unable to control the fitness instructors, who prove to be more aggressive than expected. Seeing that they do not provide the students with water, Gamby decides to fire the instructors, earning him the respect of the teachers. When the day ends, Gamby exits the principal's office.

== Production ==
=== Development ===
In September 2017, HBO confirmed that the episode would be titled "Think Change", and that it would be written by series co-creator Danny McBride, co-executive producer John Carcieri, and Jeff Fradley, and directed by executive producer David Gordon Green. This was McBride's thirteenth writing credit, Carcieri's twelfth writing credit, Fradley's second writing credit, and Green's fourth directing credit.

== Reception ==
=== Viewers ===
In its original American broadcast, "Think Change" was seen by an estimated 0.654 million household viewers with a 0.3 in the 18–49 demographics. This means that 0.3 percent of all households with televisions watched the episode. This was a 27% decrease in viewership from the previous episode, which was watched by 0.892 million viewers with a 0.3 in the 18–49 demographics.

=== Critical reviews ===
"Think Change" received very positive reviews from critics. Kyle Fowle of The A.V. Club gave the episode an "A–" grade and wrote, "Last week’s episode, 'The King,' was certainly funny, but it felt weirdly isolated from the overall arc of the season. The show started out hot this season, immediately picking up with Neil Gamby's hunt for his shooter, and giving us a hint of the dictatorial stylings of Lee Russell as Principal, which made the meandering nature of 'The King' all the more disappointing. 'Think Change' isn't exactly a return to the 'who shot Gamby?' plot either, but it's a much more successful, funny, scathing episode of TV."

Karen Han of Vulture gave the episode a 4 star rating out of 5 and wrote, "This week's episode mostly serves to establish two things: Russell will never change, and against all odds, Gamby would actually make a good principal. Neither fact is particularly surprising. It's become clearer and clearer that, for all that Vice Principals is an indictment of present-day American masculinity, Gamby is set to play out the story's hero arc. And to balance that out, the curtain's been pulled back further and further on Lee's sociopathic streak." Nick Harley of Den of Geek gave the episode a 4 star rating out of 5 and wrote, "It's becoming clear that Vice Principals is gearing back up for a Gamby versus Russell showdown, and the road to that inevitable clash is getting more enjoyable each week. Tonight's 'Think Change,' the best episode of season thus far, finds the series looking to establish that Russell is irredeemable while setting up Gamby for some sort of redemption."
