= The Good Book (Vice Principals) =

- Vice Principals episode
- Episode no.: Season 1 Episode 7
- Directed by: Jody Hill
- Written by: Danny McBride; John Carcieri; Hayes Davenport
- Cinematography by: Eric Treml
- Editing by: Jeff Seibenick; Todd Zelin
- Original release date: August 28, 2016
- Running time: 30 minutes

Guest appearances
- Robin Bartlett as Octavia LeBlanc; Mike O'Gorman as Bill Hayden; Edi Patterson as Jen Abbott; James M. Connor as Martin Seychelles; RJ Cyler as Luke Brown; Brian Tyree Henry as Dascious Brown; Maya G. Love as Janelle Gamby

Episode chronology
← Previous "The Foundation of Learning"	Next → "Gin"

"The Good Book" is the seventh episode of the first season of the American dark comedy television series Vice Principals. The episode was written by series co-creator Danny McBride, co-executive producer John Carcieri, and Hayes Davenport, and directed by series co-creator Jody Hill. It was released on HBO on August 28, 2016.

The series follows the co-vice principals of North Jackson High School, Neal Gamby and Lee Russell, both of which are disliked for their personalities. When the principal decides to retire, an outsider named Dr. Belinda Brown is assigned to succeed him. This prompts Gamby and Russell to put aside their differences and team up to take her down. In the episode, the teachers are attending a teacher workday at North Jackson, where problems arise for Gamby, Russell and Brown.

According to Nielsen Media Research, the episode was seen by an estimated 0.620 million household viewers and gained a 0.3 ratings share among adults aged 18–49. The episode received mixed reviews from critics, who praised the performances and emotional tone, while others criticized its thin characterization and under-developed stories.

== Plot ==
It is teacher workday at North Jackson, and not all teachers are delighted. Brown (Kimberly Hébert Gregory) assigns Gamby (Danny McBride) to fix multiple leaks in the school's ceilings. Russell (Walton Goggins) tries to fix his mistake with Brown, but she instead assigns him to watch over her children for the day.

Gamby is approached by Snodgrass (Georgia King), who convinces him in unlocking the kitchen to make food. While cooking, they hold hands and almost kiss, but Gamby talks himself out of it. While checking the hallway, Gamby sees a man (Brian Tyree Henry) trying to steal from a vending machine. After chasing him, he finally catches him, just as Brown arrives. The man is her ex-husband, Dascious, who wanted to see his children after they called. Brown refuses to allow him and has Gamby take him out of the school. She reprimands her children, and threatens Russell with firing him if they leave the room.

Gamby joins Snodgrass in lunch, where he defends her from insults from Hayden (Mike O'Gorman) and Abbott (Edi Patterson) for a book she was writing. He is then accidentally called by Gale (Busy Philipps), who says that Janelle (Maya G. Love) has been doing great at motocross. Thinking she called to annoy him, he leaves the lunch and goes to the woods. He finds Brown, who is also struggling with his ex's re-appearance, revealing that he was caught having sex with a woman, an event that was witnessed by their children. Thanking Gamby for his compassion, she says he has her support. Back at their room, Russell convinces the kids to open up about any dark event in Brown's life. They agree to reveal anything, if Russell brings them items from the vending machine. When Russell returns, he finds that they escaped through the air vent.

Heading back to school, Gamby is joined by Snodgrass. They see Dascious, who once again runs off as they try to catch him. He eventually makes his way to Brown's conference, and uses a speaker to explain his regrets and how he wants to be with his family again. Brown claims that he cannot live with them, but that he is always welcome to visit his children at the motel. They then head out to the children's room, just as Russell gets them in time. Snodgrass decides to let Gamby read her manuscript, and they both kiss for the first time. As he leaves the school, Gamby is called by Gale, who informs him that Janelle had a motocross incident and she has been calling his name. Russell drives Gamby to the hospital, where Gamby consoles a crying Janelle.

== Production ==
=== Development ===
In July 2016, HBO confirmed that the episode would be titled "The Good Book", and that it would be written by series co-creator Danny McBride, co-executive producer John Carcieri, and Hayes Davenport, and directed by series co-creator Jody Hill. This was McBride's seventh writing credit, Carcieri's sixth writing credit, Davenport's second writing credit, and Hill's sixth directing credit.

== Reception ==
=== Viewers ===
In its original American broadcast, "The Good Book" was seen by an estimated 0.620 million household viewers with a 0.3 in the 18–49 demographics. This means that 0.3 percent of all households with televisions watched the episode. This was a 28% decrease in viewership from the previous episode, which was watched by 0.854 million viewers with a 0.4 in the 18–49 demographics.

=== Critical reviews ===
"The Good Book" received mixed reviews from critics. Kyle Fowle of The A.V. Club gave the episode a "C+" grade and wrote, "As much as 'The Good Book' builds off of existing characterizations and really is a nicely done, surreal homage, it does more harm than good in terms of the show's momentum and the sense that it's got everything figured out."

Andrew Lapin of Vulture gave the episode a 2 star rating out of 5 and wrote, "The problem with isolating all the major characters in the school together, each with their cute little story lines, is that it reveals just how fundamentally uninteresting most of them are. Apart from Gamby, Russell, and Dr. Brown, everyone is driven by petty, sitcom-y grievances: jealousy (Ms. Abbott and Bill Hayden), mild infatuation (Snodgrass), the desire to get high (Brown's kids). A series that began with a thousand think pieces accusing it of pushing bad-taste comedy too far has somehow, by its seventh episode, become a milquetoast affair."

Nick Harley of Den of Geek gave the episode a 3.5 star rating out of 5 and wrote, "This week, Vice Principals played several moments straight, and tonight the show seemed to transcend the label of a comedy series, instead presenting itself like some sort of adult version of a Coming-of-Age John Hughes movie." Jacob Hall of Esquire wrote, "Fatherhood hasn't transformed Gamby into a stand-up man, of course. The humiliations of last week still sting in the opening scenes of "The Good Book," with Gamby returning a few of his daughter's homemade gifts because surely her stepfather will appreciate them more. It's a pitch-perfect depiction of self-loathing, a hilarious non-apology played to perfection by McBride."
