= The Field Trip (Vice Principals) =

- Vice Principals episode
- Episode no.: Season 1 Episode 3
- Directed by: Danny McBride
- Written by: Danny McBride; John Carcieri; Adam Countee
- Cinematography by: Eric Treml
- Editing by: Travis Sittard
- Original release date: July 31, 2016
- Running time: 30 minutes

Guest appearances
- Mike O'Gorman as Bill Hayden; Edi Patterson as Jen Abbott; Maya G. Love as Janelle Gamby

Episode chronology
← Previous "A Trusty Steed"	Next → "Run for the Money"

"The Field Trip" is the third episode of the first season of the American dark comedy television series Vice Principals. The episode was written by series co-creator Danny McBride, co-executive producer John Carcieri, and Adam Countee, and directed by McBride. It was released on HBO on July 31, 2016.

The series follows the co-vice principals of North Jackson High School, Neal Gamby and Lee Russell, both of which are disliked for their personalities. When the principal decides to retire, an outsider named Dr. Belinda Brown is assigned to succeed him. This prompts Gamby and Russell to put aside their differences and team up to take her down. In the episode, Gamby wants to get close to Snodgrass, so he invites himself to a school field trip.

According to Nielsen Media Research, the episode was seen by an estimated 0.889 million household viewers and gained a 0.4 ratings share among adults aged 18–49. The episode received mixed reviews from critics, who criticized the lack of momentum following the previous episode.

== Plot ==
Wanting to get closer to teacher Amanda Snodgrass (Georgia King), Gamby (Danny McBride) decides to join her at lunch. However, he is hit by a beef from afar, causing the entire cafeteria to laugh at him. Talking with her, he is informed that she is planning on going on a field trip to Charles Towne Landing with the class of history teacher Bill Hayden (Mike O'Gorman). After getting Hayden to invite him to the field trip, he asks Russell (Walton Goggins) to provide him with Snodgrass' information from her records.

During the trip, Gamby expresses disdain at the site's recreation of slavery. He tries to get close to Snodgrass, but obstacles get in his way. He agrees to join her and the others for dinner, and reads Snodgrass' information from Russell's binder. However, he over-sleeps, causing him to arrive late. His food order will take time and the rest of the teachers leave, although Snodgrass stays with him. Snodgrass says that the teachers do not like Gamby, as his controlling nature is ruining the trip. Gamby then insults her and accuses her of speaking on behalf of Hayden, prompting her to leave.

He returns to his room, where he tosses the binder in the trash. He discovers that many of the students have taken some of his alcohol, while two of them are also having sex in a room. He visits Hayden to alert him, discovering that the teachers, including Snodgrass, are all drinking alcohol. Instead of calling the police, he has the teachers search throughout the hotel to find the teenagers. As Gamby and Hayden argue, they discover the students and bring them to their room. He scolds them, and puts the blame on Hayden for not watching the students. Everyone leaves, except for teacher Jen Abbott (Edi Patterson), who takes a liking to Gamby.

The next morning, Gamby discovers that he and Abbott spent the night together. While at the gift store, he is approached by Snodgrass. She apologizes for her comments, although Gamby does not disclose what happened to Abbott. After buying a gift for his daughter, he heads back to his room, finding that Abbott has found and read Snodgrass' binder. He asks her not to say anything. Later, the teachers and students board the bus and leave the hotel.

== Production ==
=== Development ===
In June 2016, HBO confirmed that the episode would be titled "The Field Trip", and that it would be written by series creator Danny McBride, co-executive producer John Carcieri, and Adam Countee, and directed by McBride. This was McBride's third writing credit, Carcieri's second writing credit, Countee's first writing credit, and McBride's first directing credit.

== Reception ==
=== Viewers ===
In its original American broadcast, "The Field Trip" was seen by an estimated 0.889 million household viewers with a 0.4 in the 18–49 demographics. This means that 0.4 percent of all households with televisions watched the episode. This was a 11% increase in viewership from the previous episode, which was watched by 0.794 million viewers with a 0.4 in the 18–49 demographics.

=== Critical reviews ===
"The Field Trip" received mixed reviews from critics. Kyle Fowle of The A.V. Club gave the episode a "B–" grade and wrote, "After a funny but rather sluggish and tidy premiere, the second episode of the season felt more like the show finding itself, settling into its groove of whiny adult men freaking out over not getting what they want. Momentum was created in 'A Trusty Steed,' and yet it's all almost for naught, as 'The Field Trip' sees the show trending backwards."

Andrew Lapin of Vulture gave the episode a 2 star rating out of 5 and wrote, "Am I being too hard on the guy for regretting a one-night stand? Not when the joke seems to point to a general inconsistency in the show's approach to its subject matter. Just last week, these guys were committing arson to further their cause. Now Gamby is back to being a lovable man-child? Since they've crossed that line, I would prefer Vice Principals to go dark or go home. Otherwise, what have we truly learned here?"

Nick Harley of Den of Geek gave the episode a 3 star rating out of 5 and wrote, "After turning things up a notch last week, Vice Principals dialed things back considerably and broke up the duo that has proven to be their not-so-secret weapon. The episode was still enjoyable, but you can't go back to average after being incendiary." Nick Hogan of TV Overmind wrote, "All in all, this was still a really funny episode. But the more Gamby tried with Miss Snodgrass and being liked by the teachers, the more uncomfortable things got. Still. I laughed. A lot."
