= Circles (Vice Principals) =

- Vice Principals episode
- Episode no.: Season 1 Episode 5
- Directed by: Jody Hill
- Written by: Danny McBride; John Carcieri; Hayes Davenport
- Cinematography by: Eric Treml
- Editing by: Todd Zelin
- Original release date: August 14, 2016
- Running time: 30 minutes

Guest appearances
- Susan Park as Christine Russell; James M. Connor as Seychelles; Maya G. Love as Janelle Gamby; June Kyoto Lu as Mi Cha; Owen Harn as Jackie

Episode chronology
← Previous "Run for the Money"	Next → "The Foundation of Learning"

"Circles" is the fifth episode of the first season of the American dark comedy television series Vice Principals. The episode was written by series co-creator Danny McBride, co-executive producer John Carcieri, and Hayes Davenport, and directed by series co-creator Jody Hill. It was released on HBO on August 14, 2016.

The series follows the co-vice principals of North Jackson High School, Neal Gamby and Lee Russell, both of which are disliked for their personalities. When the principal decides to retire, an outsider named Dr. Belinda Brown is assigned to succeed him. This prompts Gamby and Russell to put aside their differences and team up to take her down. In the episode, Gamby and Russell cut ties, with Russell facing problems from his neighbor.

According to Nielsen Media Research, the episode was seen by an estimated 0.819 million household viewers and gained a 0.4 ratings share among adults aged 18–49. The episode received positive reviews from critics, who praised the performances (particularly Walton Goggins) and character development.

== Plot ==
Christine (Susan Park) is unable to sleep due to the music from one of their neighbors, Jackie (Owen Harn). She asks Russell (Walton Goggins) to talk to Jackie to turn the volume down. Russell is unable to convince Jackie in doing so, with Jackie humiliating Russell in front of her. Later, he makes an anonymous police report, although Jackie sees him peeping through the window.

Brown (Kimberly Hébert Gregory) is surprised by the number of students that have been sent to detention by Gamby (Danny McBride). She decides to create a better environment for the students, ordering puff seats and even granting them popcorn. Gamby is not convinced of her methods, although the students now are more willing to improve their behavior. Having ruined their last venture, Gamby also cuts ties with Russell. Christine is also harassed by Jackie at a supermarket. When Russell confronts him, Jackie punches him and warns him not to report him again.

Gamby is frustrated when Dayshawn (Sheaun McKinney) suggests he and Russell are in a gay relationship, given the number of times they went to the woods. He opens up to some of the students at detention, questioning if he can even reconcile with Russell. When a student suggests that he express his true feelings, Gamby goes to Russell's office, finding it empty. Russell has taken sodas, piled them in a pillow bag and smashes Jackie's music player. This causes Jackie to brutally attack him, just as Gamby arrives. Gamby, using brass knuckles he got from a student, brutally hits Jackie in the face, knocking him unconscious. Gamby apologizes for his behavior, but Russell apologizes as well, and both decide to continue as allies.

== Production ==
=== Development ===
In July 2016, HBO confirmed that the episode would be titled "Circles", and that it would be written by series co-creator Danny McBride, co-executive producer John Carcieri, and Hayes Davenport, and directed by series co-creator Jody Hill. This was McBride's fifth writing credit, Carcieri's fourth writing credit, Davenport's first writing credit, and Hill's fourth directing credit.

== Reception ==
=== Viewers ===
In its original American broadcast, "Circles" was seen by an estimated 0.819 million household viewers with a 0.4 in the 18–49 demographics. This means that 0.3 percent of all households with televisions watched the episode. This was a 15% increase in viewership from the previous episode, which was watched by 0.708 million viewers with a 0.3 in the 18–49 demographics.

=== Critical reviews ===
"Circles" received positive reviews from critics. Kyle Fowle of The A.V. Club gave the episode a "B+" grade and wrote, "So, while Vice Principals has been struggling to find its footing, 'Circles' does a good job of digging into the motivations and psyche of its main characters in order to add a little depth to the comedy. The pacing still feels off but there's a rhythm being established that could lead to a solid final few episodes of the season."

Andrew Lapin of Vulture gave the episode a 2 star rating out of 5 and wrote, "Even as 'Circles' begins to hint at some homoerotic subtext between these rivals — a development that would take this show in legitimately unexpected directions, rather than darker and darker ones — it makes sure to end on something aggro and testosterone-affirming enough to keep everyone on the same page for a little bit longer. That's a shame. We were almost on the verge of a major breakthrough, and it didn't even take popcorn."

Nick Harley of Den of Geek gave the episode a 3.5 star rating out of 5 and wrote, "'The Circle' is the best episode yet for a lot of reasons, chief among them being Walton Goggins' increased screen time. I've been saying that he's the best part of the series every week, so it was great to see him get the bulk of the episode here." Nick Hogan of TV Overmind wrote, "This wasn't the funniest episode Vice Principals has done, but it really set things up well for the remainder of the season. And still, it was really funny. With Russell integrated more, this should be an entertaining season to the end."
