= Spring Break (Vice Principals) =

- Vice Principals episode
- Episode no.: Season 2 Episode 7
- Directed by: David Gordon Green
- Written by: Danny McBride; John Carcieri; Jeff Fradley
- Cinematography by: Michael Simmonds
- Editing by: Todd Zelin
- Original release date: October 29, 2017
- Running time: 32 minutes

Guest appearances
- Edi Patterson as Jen Abbott; Fisher Stevens as Brian Biehn; Maya G. Love as Janelle Gamby

Episode chronology
← Previous "The Most Popular Boy"	Next → "Venetian Nights"

"Spring Break" is the seventh episode of the second season of the American dark comedy television series Vice Principals. It is the sixteenth overall episode of the series and was written by series co-creator Danny McBride, co-executive producer John Carcieri, and Jeff Fradley, and directed by executive producer David Gordon Green. It was released on HBO on October 29, 2017.

The series follows the co-vice principals of North Jackson High School, Neal Gamby and Lee Russell, both of which are disliked for their personalities. When the principal decides to retire, an outsider named Dr. Belinda Brown is assigned to succeed him. This prompts Gamby and Russell to put aside their differences and team up to take her down. In the episode, Gamby goes on a spring break vacation with Janelle, taking Russell with him as well.

According to Nielsen Media Research, the episode was seen by an estimated 0.604 million household viewers and gained a 0.2 ratings share among adults aged 18–49. The episode received extremely positive reviews from critics, who praised the performances, themes, character development and twist ending.

== Plot ==
Russell (Walton Goggins) meets with Gamby (Danny McBride), Snodgrass (Georgia King) and Nash (Dale Dickey) in the woods, thanking them for saving his career. To make sure they are in this together, they use a knife to cut part of their fingers to make a blood pact. Russell and Christine get a divorce.

Spring break begins, and Gamby prepares for a yearly tradition of taking Janelle (Maya G. Love) and her friends to the beach. However, Russell asks to come along, needing help after his divorce, and Gamby accepts after he offers to let them take his car. Before their departure, Abbott (Edi Patterson) shows up at Janelle's house to try to sneak into the trip, and has a meltdown when she realizes that Russell is leaving with Gamby. Meanwhile, Snodgrass accompanies Brian (Fisher Stevens) for an art festival, where she joins him in dining with other writers. The writers suggest that Snodgrass should stand firm on her manuscript, while Brian still suggests she takes notes. When she asks him his real opinion of her manuscript, Brian states he finds it very derivative of other books and not compelling, admitting that he only sent the manuscript because he wanted to be with her.

At the beach, Gamby confesses to Russell that while he thinks Abbott is crazy, he stays with her as he dislikes being single. The trip also proves to be a more embarrassing experience for Gamby, as Janelle does not seem to enjoy the activities they used to do. Per Russell's suggestion, he allows Janelle and her friends to go on their own, while he and Russell go to a bar. Russell convinces Gamby to snort cocaine, and both end up in a strip club. During this, he calls Snodgrass, telling her that he read her manuscript and loved it, delighting her.

Gamby is soon called when the girls are arrested for robbing a store, upsetting him that he no longer knows his own daughter. When they return to their rented house, they find that Abbott has made her way to town, angry that Gamby has not "apologized" for excluding her from the trip. She takes his phone and gets angrier when she finds that Gamby called Snodgrass. Gamby confesses that he did not want to be single, ending their relationship. Back at the art festival, Snodgrass takes a podium and reads aloud her favorite chapter from the manuscript for the audience's opinion. After she is mocked for her writing, she flees the event.

While Gamby enters his bedroom, he is surprised by Janelle, who is donning the mask of the shooter. Gamby's suspicions are confirmed when he finds more of the shooter's clothing in Russell's car. The next day, he ignores Russell as they prepare to leave. Janelle apologizes for her behavior and embraces him. While staring at Russell, Gamby consoles her, telling her they all make mistakes.

== Production ==
=== Development ===
In September 2017, HBO confirmed that the episode would be titled "Spring Break", and that it would be written by series co-creator Danny McBride, co-executive producer John Carcieri, and Jeff Fradley, and directed by executive producer David Gordon Green. This was McBride's sixteenth writing credit, Carcieri's fifteenth writing credit, Fradley's fourth writing credit, and Green's seventh directing credit.

== Reception ==
=== Viewers ===
In its original American broadcast, "Spring Break" was seen by an estimated 0.604 million household viewers with a 0.2 in the 18–49 demographics. This means that 0.2 percent of all households with televisions watched the episode. This was a slight decrease in viewership from the previous episode, which was watched by 0.647 million viewers with a 0.3 in the 18–49 demographics.

=== Critical reviews ===
"Spring Break" received extremely positive reviews from critics. Kyle Fowle of The A.V. Club gave the episode an "A–" grade and wrote, "Going on the assumption that the gear Gamby finds at the end of the episode does indeed belong to Russell, 'Spring Break' sets the stage for the show to come full circle. We're back to Gamby vs. Russell, and that's always a good thing."

Karen Han of Vulture gave the episode a 4 star rating out of 5 and wrote, "As you may have noticed, Neal Gamby hasn't really made much headway in figuring out who shot him. Don't worry, though: Jody Hill and Danny McBride know it, too. With Vice Principals moving toward its final episodes, Gamby takes down his shooter conspiracy board as he packs to go on spring break with his daughter. He can't keep obsessing over the attempt on his life — he's got livin' to do." Nick Harley of Den of Geek gave the episode a 4 star rating out of 5 and wrote, "Season two of Vice Principals has been sharper and funnier than the first and I can't wait to see the deranged action that awaits us in the last two episodes."
