= The Foundation of Learning =

- Vice Principals episode
- Episode no.: Season 1 Episode 6
- Directed by: Jody Hill
- Written by: Danny McBride; John Carcieri; Ben Dougan
- Cinematography by: Eric Treml
- Editing by: Jeff Seibenick; Todd Zelin
- Original release date: August 21, 2016
- Running time: 31 minutes

Guest appearances
- Robin Bartlett as Octavia LeBlanc; Brian Howe as Jeremy Haas; Mike O'Gorman as Bill Hayden; Maya G. Love as Janelle Gamby; June Kyoto Lu as Mi Cha; Katy Purnell as Carrie

Episode chronology
← Previous "Circles"	Next → "The Good Book"

"The Foundation of Learning" is the sixth episode of the first season of the American dark comedy television series Vice Principals. The episode was written by series co-creator Danny McBride, co-executive producer John Carcieri, and Ben Dougan, and directed by series co-creator Jody Hill. It was released on HBO on August 21, 2016.

The series follows the co-vice principals of North Jackson High School, Neal Gamby and Lee Russell, both of which are disliked for their personalities. When the principal decides to retire, an outsider named Dr. Belinda Brown is assigned to succeed him. This prompts Gamby and Russell to put aside their differences and team up to take her down. In the episode, Gamby asks Snodgrass for help in learning motocross, while Russell schemes a plan to build distrust towards Brown.

According to Nielsen Media Research, the episode was seen by an estimated 0.854 million household viewers and gained a 0.4 ratings share among adults aged 18–49. The episode received positive reviews from critics, who praised the humor, character development and ending.

== Plot ==
Snodgrass (Georgia King) is revealed to be in a sexual relationship with Hayden (Mike O'Gorman). However, Hayden wants to end their relationship, as her new shift will force them to accommodate their schedules, upsetting Snodgrass.

Many books at North Jackson have been reported missing, with Russell (Walton Goggins) telling Brown (Kimberly Hébert Gregory) that a teacher, Octavia LeBlanc (Robin Bartlett), may be responsible. That night, it is revealed that Russell and Gamby (Danny McBride) are revealed behind the books, hiding them in Russell's backyard. Snodgrass visits Gamby at his office, seeing pictures of Janelle (Maya G. Love) engaging in motocross activities. She asks for shifting her schedule, which Gamby grants, although he mentions that it can only happen at the end of the ongoing quarter due to school policy, disappointing her.

Wanting to impress Janelle, Gamby tries to get into motocross, although he clearly lacks experience. He is further maddened when Ray (Shea Whigham) successfully pulls off a wheelie. He asks Snodgrass, familiar with motocross, for help, promising to change her schedule. Snodgrass is not detailed in her instructions, causing Gamby to struggle. However, after seeing that Hayden goes out with a teacher, Snodgrass becomes more determined to teach him. After guiding him, he successfully rides a motor bike by himself, and manages to achieve the wheelie. As part of their deal, Gamby changes her schedule.

As part of Russell's plan, Brown confronts LeBlanc over the missing books. She denies being involved, causing friction between them. During the night, Russell and Gamby sneak into the school's warehouse to place the books back in their place, hoping it will lead to teacher distrusting Brown. The next day, Russell accompanies Brown to a hearing with Superintendent Haas (Brian Howe), where she argues with LeBlanc. During this, Gamby visits the warehouse for a check-up, reporting that the books have been found. This is notified to the hearing, humiliating Brown.

Snodgrass informs Hayden about her shift, but leaves disappointed when she sees that he wants the teacher involved as well. She catches up with Gamby, just as he leaves for motocross, wanting to accompany him. At the track, Gamby tries to pull off the wheelie, but fails, and the bike crashes into a cabin. Despite Ray asking for clemency, Gamby is told that he must leave or face arrest, disappointing Janelle. While driving, Gamby is consoled by Snodgrass, who holds his hand. At the school, Russell is preparing Brown's coffee, spitting in it. However, Brown catches him and leaves in disbelief.

== Production ==
=== Development ===
In July 2016, HBO confirmed that the episode would be titled "The Foundation of Learning", and that it would be written by series co-creator Danny McBride, co-executive producer John Carcieri, and Ben Dougan, and directed by series co-creator Jody Hill. This was McBride's sixth writing credit, Carcieri's fifth writing credit, Dougan's first writing credit, and Hill's fifth directing credit.

== Reception ==
=== Viewers ===
In its original American broadcast, "The Foundation of Learning" was seen by an estimated 0.854 million household viewers with a 0.4 in the 18–49 demographics. This means that 0.3 percent of all households with televisions watched the episode. This was a slight increase in viewership from the previous episode, which was watched by 0.819 million viewers with a 0.4 in the 18–49 demographics.

=== Critical reviews ===
"The Foundation of Learning" received positive reviews from critics. Kyle Fowle of The A.V. Club gave the episode a "B+" grade and wrote, "With the characters more firmly established, 'The Foundation Of Learning' sees Vice Principals switching gears a bit, going for a more low-stakes, low-key approach to the story its telling, and the show is better off for it."

Andrew Lapin of Vulture gave the episode a 2 star rating out of 5 and wrote, "Disappointingly, we get very little of Gamby and Russell together in this episode, despite last week's protracted makeup session. What little time they share does lead to the episode's biggest laugh, as they fight on their lifting machines in the textbook warehouse, cameras positioned on the machines themselves like the world's saddest go-kart race."

Nick Harley of Den of Geek gave the episode a 3.5 star rating out of 5 and wrote, "Gamby's exposure of his real self to Snodgrass isn't the only shared reveal of the episode, because Russell mistakenly shows his true colors to Dr. Brown, when she shockingly finds him spitting into her coffee, exposing himself as the snake as he is. Between Gamby and Snodgrass and Russell and Dr. Brown, things are about to get interesting." Nick Hogan of TV Overmind wrote, "This episode was funny, and hit all the right emotional notes. Not to mention that Dr. Brown is finally on to Mr. Russell. I'm as excited as ever for the next episode."
