= Run for the Money =

Run for the Money may refer to:

- Run for the Money (video game), a 1984 business simulation game
- Hard Cash (2002 film), a direct-to-video action film

== Television ==
- "Run for the Money" (Vice Principals), episode 4 of Vice Principals season 1
- "Run for the Money", episode 18 of Daniel Boone season 6
- "Run for the Money", episode 9 of M*A*S*H season 11

== See also ==
- Run for Money, a 1999 Turkish film
- Run for money: Tōsō-chū, a Japanese game show and multimedia franchise
- A Run for Your Money, a 1949 comedy film
- wikt:run for one's money
