= The Principal (Vice Principals) =

- Vice Principals episode
- Episode no.: Season 1 Episode 1
- Directed by: Jody Hill
- Written by: Danny McBride; Jody Hill
- Cinematography by: Eric Treml
- Editing by: Jeff Seibenick
- Original release date: July 17, 2016
- Running time: 30 minutes

Guest appearances
- Bill Murray as Principal Welles; Robin Bartlett as Octavia LeBlanc; Brian Howe as Jeremy Haas; Mike O'Gorman as Bill Hayden; Edi Patterson as Jen Abbott; Celia Weston as Mrs. Libby; James Michael Connor as Seychelles; Maya G. Love as Janelle Gamby; Rebecca Tilney as Maria Welles

Episode chronology
← Previous —	Next → "A Trusty Steed"

"The Principal" is the series premiere of the American dark comedy television series Vice Principals. The episode was written by series creators Danny McBride and Jody Hill, and directed by Hill. It was released on HBO on July 17, 2016.

The series follows the co-vice principals of North Jackson High School, Neal Gamby and Lee Russell, both of which are disliked for their personalities. When the principal decides to retire, an outsider named Dr. Belinda Brown is assigned to succeed him. The episode establishes the characters and subsequent goals.

According to Nielsen Media Research, the episode was seen by an estimated 1.15 million household viewers and gained a 0.5 ratings share among adults aged 18–49. The episode received mixed reviews from critics, who praised the performances and humor, although some criticized the thin characterization and pacing of the episode.

== Plot ==
At North Jackson High School, Principal Welles (Bill Murray) is retiring, having to tend to his sick wife. He assembles the school's co-vice principals, Neal Gamby (Danny McBride) and Lee Russell (Walton Goggins), to make the Pledge of Allegiance with him as he is about to leave. Gamby and Russell often conflict with each other, which annoys Welles. Welles informs them that a new successor will be decided by Superintendent Haas (Brian Howe).

Gamby confides to cafeteria worker Dayshawn (Sheaun McKinney) that he wants the position of principal, although Dayshawn claims Gamby won't have the vote of confidence from other teachers. Russell has been making derogatory pamphlets insulting Gamby, while also trying to spend more time with teachers in order to boost his image. Gamby is also trying to spend time with his daughter Janelle (Maya G. Love), while also conflicting with his ex-wife Gale (Busy Philipps) and her husband Ray (Shea Whigham), informing them that he was announced as principal despite no confirmation. When he arrives home, he is called by Haas to meet him the next morning for the new principal position, delighting him.

Gamby and Russell meet with Haas, who announces that Dr. Belinda Brown (Kimberly Hébert Gregory), an educator from Philadelphia, has been selected as Welles' successor. Gamby intends to file a complaint against her, but fails to get support from the other teachers. At night, he returns home to see that Janelle and Ray have thrown a celebration for his promotion, causing him to open up about not getting it. Janelle says that he needs the teachers' support by hanging out with them more often. He convinces a student, Matthew Potter (Ryan Boz), to lead a non-violent student march to oppose Brown in exchange for revoking his detention. However, Matthew fails in convincing other students in joining, angering Gamby.

Brown calls Gamby to her office, as she received the complaint filed by Gamby. As the complaint has his name, Gamby confesses to writing it. Brown tells him that she expects respect from him, threatening severe consequences if he fails to do so. She further tells him that he will need to show two hours earlier for further duties. Gamby is now forced to assist in managing the school buses, when Russell arrives to mock him. Russell states that by getting close to Brown, he can know all of her information in his favor to eventually stab her in the back. While he does not like Gamby, he suggests they should form an alliance to take her down. Gamby accepts to his alliance.

== Production ==
=== Development ===
In June 2016, HBO confirmed that the episode would be titled "The Principal", and that it would be written by series creators Danny McBride and Jody Hill, and directed by Hill. This was McBride's first writing credit, Hill's first writing credit, and Hill's first directing credit.

=== Casting ===
The episode features a guest appearance by Bill Murray. His scenes were slightly delayed due to thunderstorms in South Carolina, where the series is filmed. Danny McBride convinced him to make an appearance after both worked in the film Rock the Kasbah.

== Reception ==
=== Viewers ===
In its original American broadcast, "The Principal" was seen by an estimated 1.15 million household viewers with a 0.5 in the 18–49 demographics. This means that 0.5 percent of all households with televisions watched the episode.

=== Critical reviews ===
"The Principal" received mixed reviews from critics. Kyle Fowle of The A.V. Club gave the episode a "B" grade and wrote, "Like so many series premieres, 'The Principal' struggles to balance the need for storyline setup with the looser feel of the comedy. It's not that the episode is heavy on exposition, but rather that it feels like the show still has much more to offer than what's contained in 'The Principal.' Still, the premiere does manage to show off just what this show will be."

Andrew Lapin of Vulture gave the episode a 2 star rating out of 5 and wrote, "The first episode of Vice Principals isn't nearly as funny or as subversive as its predecessor — or the hysterical Eastbound pilot. But, like a high-school kid, it has potential if it just learns to focus."

Nick Harley of Den of Geek gave the episode a 3.5 star rating out of 5 and wrote, "The premiere episode certainly has its laughs, from McBride deeming the students 'savages' and delivering foul-mouthed descriptions of the horrors of an in-school suspension, to the way Gamby dumps on his ex-wife's friendly new boyfriend Ray, played with every-man affability by Shea Whingham. Still, the episode felt short and overly focused on getting us to Gamby and Russell's uneasy-alliance. I'm certain Vice Principals has plenty of crude material left for McBride and Goggins, I just hope it adheres to a looser lesson plan in the future." Nick Hogan of TV Overmind wrote, "Overall, this was a solid premiere episode from the new HBO comedy. I hope to see more antics and ridiculousness as the show continues, as there's plenty of existing potential for those things."
