= Run for the Money (Vice Principals) =

- Vice Principals episode
- Episode no.: Season 1 Episode 4
- Directed by: Jody Hill
- Written by: Danny McBride; John Carcieri; Jeff Fradley
- Cinematography by: Eric Treml
- Editing by: Jeff Seibenick
- Original release date: August 7, 2016
- Running time: 30 minutes

Guest appearances
- Edi Patterson as Jen Abbott; RJ Cyler as Luke Brown; Amy Farrington as Principal Cavanaugh; Maya G. Love as Janelle Gamby

Episode chronology
← Previous "The Field Trip"	Next → "Circles"

"Run for the Money" is the fourth episode of the first season of the American dark comedy television series Vice Principals. The episode was written by series co-creator Danny McBride, co-executive producer John Carcieri, and Jeff Fradley, and directed by series co-creator Jody Hill. It was released on HBO on August 7, 2016.

The series follows the co-vice principals of North Jackson High School, Neal Gamby and Lee Russell, both of which are disliked for their personalities. When the principal decides to retire, an outsider named Dr. Belinda Brown is assigned to succeed him. This prompts Gamby and Russell to put aside their differences and team up to take her down. In the episode, North Jackson prepares for a homecoming football game against their longtime rivals, Percival High School.

According to Nielsen Media Research, the episode was seen by an estimated 0.708 million household viewers and gained a 0.3 ratings share among adults aged 18–49. The episode received positive reviews from critics, who praised the episode's humor, character development and performances (particularly for Kimberly Hébert Gregory).

== Plot ==
While checking her burnt house, Brown (Kimberly Hébert Gregory) is informed by an officer that the fire must've been arson. She is forced to move to a hotel with her kids, Luke (RJ Cyler) and Mario, with both proving to be uncontrollable and annoying her. The officer's claim also makes Brown consider that her kids were responsible for the arson.

North Jackson's rival school, Percival, vandalizes the school during the night, as part of an incoming homecoming football game. Gamby is also introduced to Mrs. Libby's replacement, Janice Swift (Ashley Spillers), and Gamby (Danny McBride) introduces her to the school. Gamby is also remaining in a sexual relationship with Abbott (Edi Patterson), but tells her not to say anything. Gamby meets with Russell (Walton Goggins), who states that they can vandalize the school and make bad claims against Brown, and it can be disguised as Percival. Reluctant at first, Gamby cedes in. That night, they join Percival students in vandalizing the school while wearing masks.

Having seen the damage, Brown drives to Percival accompanied by Gamby and Russell. The school's principal downplays their actions, also reiterating that they will win over North Jackson. Gamby is disappointed that their preparations are inferior to Percival's, and also finds Brown crying in her car. At her hotel, Brown confronts her kids for misbehaving, and even suggests they might have been involved in the arson as they skipped classes that day. Her children then open up about how they disliked moving away from Philadelphia without even consulting, to which she explains she just needed to be away from their father.

At a school rally, Brown gives a motivational speech, which influences the school's spirits to be lifted. Feeling that may ruin their chances, Russell suggests rigging the game by drugging their players, with Gamby opposing to that. On the game night, Gamby catches Russell drugging the team's water. They fight over the water, accidentally spilling it all over themselves, panicking Russell as the liquid gets absorbed in their skin. They quietly leave the locker room just as the effect of the drug starts kicking in. They watch from the stands as North Jackson wins the game, their first victory against Percival in 9 years. As the crowd celebrates Brown, Russell tells Gamby that he just made Brown a martyr.

== Production ==
=== Development ===
In July 2016, HBO confirmed that the episode would be titled "Run for the Money", and that it would be written by series co-creator Danny McBride, co-executive producer John Carcieri, and Jeff Fradley, and directed by series co-creator Jody Hill. This was McBride's fourth writing credit, Carcieri's third writing credit, Fradley's first writing credit, and Hill's third directing credit.

== Reception ==
=== Viewers ===
In its original American broadcast, "Run for the Money" was seen by an estimated 0.708 million household viewers with a 0.3 in the 18–49 demographics. This means that 0.3 percent of all households with televisions watched the episode. This was a 21% decrease in viewership from the previous episode, which was watched by 0.889 million viewers with a 0.4 in the 18–49 demographics.

=== Critical reviews ===
"Run for the Money" received positive reviews from critics. Kyle Fowle of The A.V. Club gave the episode a "B" grade and wrote, "Vice Principals remains on shaky ground. The inspired acid trip at the end of the episode is a wonderful visual touch, all Jody Hill exuberance, and the show is doing some interesting things when it comes to critiquing its main characters; and yet, there's still a lingering cruelty that's off-putting. For some, that cruelty won't be a problem, but rather just a symptom of the cringe comedy the show is shooting for. For others though, myself included, Vice Principals is barely balancing all of its perspectives, cruel and otherwise."

Andrew Lapin of Vulture gave the episode a 3 star rating out of 5 and wrote, "'Run for the Money' finally finds Vice Principals approaching the right balance of funny-to-awful, enough so that it was the first episode I legitimately enjoyed."

Nick Harley of Den of Geek gave the episode a 3.5 star rating out of 5 and wrote, "Last week, Vice Principals missed the mark by showing us things about Gamby's character that we already knew. By exploring Dr. Brown and making her a real, layered person, Vice Principals was able to tell a complete story that adds depth to the series to come. Cruel characters can only anchor a show for so long, so providing a character that the audience cares about makes sense in the long run. Hopefully the show continues to dedicate time to Dr. Brown's character, as she completely enriched this episode." Nick Hogan of TV Overmind wrote, "I know there has been controversy surrounding this show, but Danny McBride is a smart guy. This episode was a truly strong installment, and I hope to see the show continue to build off of exactly this."

=== Accolades ===
TVLine named Kimberly Hébert Gregory as an honorable mention as the "Performer of the Week" for the week of August 13, 2016, for her performance in the episode. The site wrote, "Sunday’s episode of HBO's Vice Principals lit a fire under Kimberly Hebert Gregory's fierce, formidable principal Dr. Brown, and watching the theater vet tear into the material was something akin to a religious experience. During the HBO comedy's first three episodes, we looked on as Danny McBride and Walton Goggins' despicably childish and mean-spirited duo attempted to destroy their new boss' spirit, even going so far as to burn down the single mother's house. Episode 4 was the first time we saw Dr. Brown crack under the strain, and Gregory made us feel every bit as angry, sad and overwhelmed as her character. And when she fought back we cheered. And man, did she ever fight back. In an Emmy reel-worthy scene, Dr. Brown hijacked the high school's pep rally and delivered a mic-dropping sermon that formally heralded Gregory's arrival as a comedic force of nature."
