= Venetian Nights =

Venetian Nights may refer to:

- Venetian Nights (film), a 1931 German French-language operetta film
- Venetian Nights (Vice Principals), an episode of the American TV series Vice Principals
