= Tigertown =

Tigertown or Tiger Town may refer to:

== Arts and entertainment ==
- Tiger Town, a 1983 American made-for-television sports drama film produced for the Disney Channel
- Tigertown (band), an Australian band in existence from 2011 to 2017
- Tigertown Pictures, the 1999 third album by British indie pop band Comet Gain
- Tiger Town (Vice Principals), an episode of the American TV series Vice Principals

== Places and locations ==
=== United States ===
- South Holyoke, Holyoke, Massachusetts, neighborhood, in the mid-nineteenth century referred to as Tigertown
- Tigertown, Texas, unincorporated community

== See also ==
- Tigerton, Wisconsin
- Tigerton (microprocessor)
