= A Trusty Steed =

- Vice Principals episode
- Episode no.: Season 1 Episode 2
- Directed by: Jody Hill
- Written by: Danny McBride; John Carcieri
- Cinematography by: Eric Treml
- Editing by: Jeff Seibenick
- Original release date: July 24, 2016
- Running time: 30 minutes

Guest appearances
- Celia Weston as Mrs. Libby; Maya G. Love as Janelle Gamby; June Kyoto Lu as Mi Cha; Susan Park as Christine Russell

Episode chronology
← Previous "Vice Principals"	Next → "The Field Trip"

"A Trusty Steed" is the second episode of the first season of the American dark comedy television series Vice Principals. The episode was written by series co-creator Danny McBride and co-executive producer John Carcieri, and directed by co-creator Jody Hill. It was released on HBO on July 24, 2016.

The series follows the co-vice principals of North Jackson High School, Neal Gamby and Lee Russell, both of which are disliked for their personalities. When the principal decides to retire, an outsider named Dr. Belinda Brown is assigned to succeed him. This prompts Gamby and Russell to put aside their differences and team up to take her down. In the episode, Gamby and Russell check on Brown's house for any vital information, where Russell displays his sociopathic personality.

According to Nielsen Media Research, the episode was seen by an estimated 0.794 million household viewers and gained a 0.4 ratings share among adults aged 18–49. The episode received positive reviews from critics, who considered it an improvement over the series premiere.

== Plot ==
Gamby (Danny McBride) and Russell (Walton Goggins) meet in the woods outside the high school, where they plan their next move against Brown (Kimberly Hébert Gregory). Russell has retrieved information on her, which reveals that she has fired the vice principals at her previous schools. They both agree to build a better profile for each other, also recognizing they will settle who gets the principal position later. Brown, meanwhile, has hired a man named Blythe Saysong to evaluate everyone in the school.

Brown talks with Gamby over Mrs. Libby (Celia Weston), a teacher who has been working since the 1980s but is known to arrive late. She instructs him to fire her, despite his reservations. Gamby summons Libby to his office and fires her in front of Saysong, causing her to have a breakdown. He then leaves with Russell to Brown's house, breaking a glass door to enter. Russell motivates Gamby in joining him in breaking many items in the house, which escalates in completely destroying her furniture. Russell then lights a curtain on fire, which extends to the house as a whole. They escape the burning house and return to the school. While Brown breaks down at the news, Gamby is distracted by his actions.

Gamby remains disturbed during the day, and also loses track of Russell. While visiting Janelle (Maya G. Love) at the horse track, he is told by Gale (Busy Philipps) and Ray (Shea Whigham) that she is losing interest in horses, and wants to get into motocross just as Gamby is in debt with the horse owner. Gamby sees Saysong watching over him and confronts him as he tries to leave, hitting his car and telling him to stay away from him. At night, Gamby visits Russell at his house, discovering that he is married to a woman named Christine (Susan Park), and is also forced to care for his mother-in-law, Mi Cha (June Kyoto Lu). Russell says Gamby enjoyed the chaos and sees "potential" in him. He also reveals that while he hates his mother-in-law, he represses his anger by spitting on her tea before serving it to her. He then offers Gamby a diamond brooch that he stole from Brown's house during their break-in, to pay off his debts, convincing him that this could be fun.

Gamby and Russell are summoned to Brown's office. She explains that Saysong's investigation concluded that while Gamby and Russell have their flaws, they are trustworthy and she considers them to be excellent vice principals for her. Gamby visits the horse owner, giving him the diamond brooch to pay his debt.

== Production ==
=== Development ===
In June 2016, HBO confirmed that the episode would be titled "A Trusty Steed", and that it would be written by series creator Danny McBride and co-executive producer John Carcieri, and directed by series creator Jody Hill. This was McBride's second writing credit, Carcieri's first writing credit, and Hill's second directing credit.

== Reception ==
=== Viewers ===
In its original American broadcast, "A Trusty Steed" was seen by an estimated 0.794 million household viewers with a 0.4 in the 18–49 demographics. This means that 0.4 percent of all households with televisions watched the episode. This was a 31% decrease in viewership from the previous episode, which was watched by 1.15 million viewers with a 0.5 in the 18–49 demographics.

=== Critical reviews ===
"A Trusty Steed" received positive reviews from critics. Kyle Fowle of The A.V. Club gave the episode a "B+" grade and wrote, "The series premiere was fun but wanting; 'A Steady Heed' sees the show finding its gloriously unhinged footing."

Andrew Lapin of Vulture gave the episode a 3 star rating out of 5 and wrote, "Whatever Russell's sinister plans may be, it doesn't seem like anything is destined to end well for these pair of second bananas. I'm prepared to take bets on whether or not they end the series by burning down the entire school. Of course, the real question will be if anyone still cares enough by then."

Nick Harley of Den of Geek gave the episode a 3.5 star rating out of 5 and wrote, "Just to hammer home how despicable Gamby and Russell act in this episode, the half hour ends with Dr. Brown complimenting the VPs' work ethic, then the men mock her while she prays, but the whole thing is sort of led by Russell. It sort of seems like the series is going to focus on Gamby being brought down to this sociopath's level. Now to see how low that level goes." Nick Hogan of TV Overmind wrote, "As a whole, the show is starting to come together. When I can expect to be a little uncomfortable with each episode, it gets easier to swallow. If uncomfortable trumped the hysterical, laugh out loud moments, then I would probably quit, but so far it hasn't. And the hilarious moments have been truly hilarious. Goggins and McBride make a great comedy team, and I hope to see it continue improvement into the coming episodes."
