= Two Step (film) =

- Directed by: Alex R. Johnson
- Written by: Alex R. Johnson
- Produced by: Alex R. Johnson; Paul Biedrzycki; Pat Cassidy; Charles Mulford
- Starring: Beth Broderick; James Landry Hébert; Skyy Moore; Jason Douglas; Ashley Rae Spillers
- Cinematography: Andy Lilien
- Edited by: Benjamin Moses Smith
- Music by: Andrew Kenny
- Production company: La Chima Films
- Distributed by: Traverse Media
- Release date: March 9, 2014 (SXSW)
- Running time: 93 minutes
- Country: United States
- Language: English

Two Step is a 2014 American independent Southern Gothic neo-noir thriller film written and directed by Alex R. Johnson, and starring Beth Broderick, James Landry Hébert, Skyy Moore, Jason Douglas, and Ashley Rae Spillers. Moore plays a young adult who, while settling his recently deceased grandmother's affairs with a new friend (Broderick), meets the small-time criminal (Hébert) who conned his grandmother. It premiered at the 2014 SXSW film festival on March 9, 2014, and was released theatrically on July 31, 2015.

== Plot ==
James, a young adult from El Paso, comes to Austin to visit his grandmother, only for her to die shortly after his arrival. His grandmother's lawyer, Ray Mance, tells James that she knew she was ill and made it easy for James to claim his inheritance of $85,000. While staying at his grandmother's house, James meets her next-door neighbor, Dot, a middle-aged dance instructor. After consoling him, Dot invites James to drinks at a local bar, and the two get to know each other better. James says that his parents' deaths made college awkward for him, as he did not wish to interact with people who were always asking about his health. After leaving college, he has ended up in Austin, where he knows nobody. Though offended that he calls her old, Dot lets him sleep on her couch when he says his grandmother's house is creepy.

At the same time, Webb, a small-time con man who specializes in grandparent scams, is released from prison and surprises his girlfriend, Amy, by coming home a day early. After he angrily chastises her for bringing up an incident in which he broke her nose, she flees the house with the money Webb conned out of senior citizens. Duane, a local crime boss, soon visits Webb and gives him two weeks to pay off $10,000 in debts. As Dot and James become friendlier, she fends off the attention of Horace, a married police officer with whom she briefly had an affair. Desperate for money, Webb pretends to be James and leaves a message that asks for more money on James' grandmother's voicemail. James, recognizing the scam, contacts Horace, who apologetically says he can do nothing to help.

When Webb shows up at James' grandmother's house in person, James attempts to trick him into coming back later. Webb instead beats him viciously and takes him prisoner. After searching the house, Webb threatens to beat him again unless James reveals the PIN to his debit card. Webb is surprised to find the large sum in James' bank account, but he can only withdraw a maximum of $900 a day because of banking regulations. Webb attempts to set up a payment plan with Duane, but Duane reveals he is uninterested in the money and only wanted to scare Webb out of town, as Webb is too violent and unpredictable. Webb becomes further incensed when he learns from a friend that Duane and Amy are rumored to be living together. After killing Mance, who came to visit James, he leaves again.

Horace's wife leaves him when she discovers his infidelity. Dot acknowledges an attraction to him but tells him that she wishes to wait until his divorce goes through. As Dot becomes worried about James, he slowly works his way toward a knife sticking out of Mance's pocket. Despite his binds, he cuts himself loose. Webb kills Amy, recovers the money she stole, and confronts Duane, whom he shoots. As Duane dies, he protests that he could have killed Webb many times but did not. Webb says that he should have when he had the chance. When Webb returns to James' grandmother's house, he is surprised to see James missing. As Webb rushes out of the kitchen, he collides with James, who is still holding the knife. Impaled, Webb collapses to the floor and dies. James stumbles out of the house, where Dot sees him.

== Cast ==
- Beth Broderick as Dot
- James Landry Hébert as Webb
- Skyy Moore as James
- Jason Douglas as Duane
- Ashley Rae Spillers as Amy
- Barry Tubb as Horace
- Brady Coleman as Ray Mance
- Jesse Dayton as Bobby

== Production ==
After his career failed to take off in New York, writer-director Johnson moved to Austin, Texas, where he was inspired to write Two Step. A fan of film noir, Johnson was influenced by the Coen brothers. Broderick was allowed to develop her own character, and she said it was important to her that Dot not be stereotypical. Shooting took 17 days.

== Release ==
Two Step premiered at SXSW on March 9, 2014. Traverse Media released it theatrically on July 31, 2015, and to video on demand on September 1.

== Reception ==
Rotten Tomatoes, a review aggregator, reports that 100% of 14 surveyed critics gave the film a positive review; the average rating is 7.1/10. Metacritic rated it 81/100 based on nine reviews. Geoff Berkshire of Variety wrote, "This well-acted character-driven thriller marinates in Austin atmosphere and delivers unconventional thrills." Berkshire predicted the film could develop a cult following. Frank Scheck of The Hollywood Reporter wrote that it "begins slowly and surely before ratcheting up the tension to terrific effect". Maitland McDonagh of Film Journal International called it a "sharp little slice of Southwestern noir filmmaking". Stephen Holden of The New York Times made it a "NYT Critics' Pick" and described it as "a nasty, flawlessly acted little gem that goes deep inside its characters' psyches". Robert Abele of the Los Angeles Times wrote that it is "a particularly confident and enjoyable" neo-noir thriller because Johnson understands the importance of character development and dialogue.
