= Jesus People: The Movie =

- Directed by: Jason Naumann
- Written by: Dan Ewald; Rajeev Sigamoney; Dan Steadman
- Produced by: Dan Ewald; Jason Naumann; Rajeev Sigamoney
- Starring: Mindy Sterling; Wendi McLendon-Covey; Edi Patterson
- Cinematography: Kevin Sambells
- Edited by: Matthew Reithmayr
- Music by: Raymond Schnurr
- Production company: Jesus People Productions
- Distributed by: Freestyle Releasing
- Release date: April 21, 2009 (Nashville)
- Running time: 90 minutes
- Country: United States
- Language: English

Jesus People: The Movie is a 2009 American comedy movie directed by Jason Naumann and starring Edi Patterson, Mindy Sterling and Wendi McLendon-Covey.

== Cast ==
- Joel McCrary as Pastor Jerry Frank
- Edi Patterson as Gloria Hamming
- Damon Pfaff as Zak Crowner
- Richard Pierre-Louis as Ty Raney
- Lindsay Stidham as Cara Bosch
- Mindy Sterling as Claudia
- Wendi McLendon-Covey as Jenna Bosch
- Octavia Spencer as Angel Angelique
