= Vice Principals =

American television comedy series

- Genre: Dark comedy
- Created by: Danny McBride; Jody Hill
- Directed by: Jody Hill (season 1); Danny McBride; David Gordon Green (season 2)
- Starring: Danny McBride; Walton Goggins; Kimberly Hébert Gregory; Dale Dickey; Georgia King; Sheaun McKinney; Busy Philipps; Shea Whigham
- Composer: Joseph Stephens
- Country of origin: United States
- Original language: English
- No. of seasons: 2
- No. of episodes: 18

Production
- Executive producers: Danny McBride; Jody Hill; David Gordon Green; Jonathan Watson; Stephanie Laing
- Producers: Brandon James; Adam Countee; Hayes Davenport; Ben Dougan; Tim Saccardo
- Camera setup: Single-camera
- Running time: 29–32 minutes
- Production companies: Rough House Pictures; HBO Entertainment

Original release
- Network: HBO
- Release: July 17, 2016 – November 12, 2017

Vice Principals is an American dark comedy series created by Danny McBride and Jody Hill. It premiered on HBO on July 17, 2016, and concluded on November 12, 2017, comprising 18 episodes over two seasons. It stars McBride, Walton Goggins, Kimberly Hébert Gregory, Dale Dickey, Georgia King, Sheaun McKinney, Busy Philipps, and Shea Whigham.

The series was produced by HBO Entertainment while McBride, Hill, and David Gordon Green served as executive producers through their production company Rough House Pictures.

== Synopsis ==
At North Jackson High School, foul-mouthed vice principal Neal Gamby has ambitions of becoming the principal. However, when the current principal steps down, he reveals that he trusts neither Neal nor his Machiavellian co-vice principal, Lee Russell, and instead hires outsider Dr. Belinda Brown. Neal attempts to get the school faculty to veto the appointment, but Belinda makes a positive impression on the staff with her goal-oriented agenda and popularity with students. The effort backfires, so he conspires with Lee to ruin Belinda's reputation and install one of them as principal. As their scheme unfolds, Neal and Lee gradually self-destruct, as their own biases and loathsomeness alienate Belinda and the rest of their co-workers.

== Cast ==
=== Main ===
- Danny McBride as Neal Gamby, the divorced, self-important, authoritarian vice principal in charge of discipline at North Jackson High.
- Walton Goggins as Lee Russell, vice principal of curriculum at North Jackson High, a conniving office-politician with sociopathic tendencies who enters into an unholy alliance with Neal.
- Kimberly Hébert Gregory as Dr. Belinda Brown, North Jackson High's confident and powerful new school principal.
- Georgia King as Amanda Snodgrass, the idealistic new English teacher at North Jackson High.
- Sheaun McKinney as Dayshawn, a cafeteria worker Neal frequently confides in.
- Busy Philipps as Gale Liptrapp, Neal's ex-wife and Ray Liptrapp's new bride.
- Shea Whigham as Ray Liptrapp, the new husband of Neal's ex, and frequent target of his hostility despite being a genuine and supportive guy
- Dale Dickey as Nash (season 2), the new vice principal.

=== Recurring ===
- Maya G. Love as Janelle Gamby, Neal and Gale's daughter, of whom Gale has primary custody.
- Edi Patterson as Jen Abbott, a Civics teacher at North Jackson High with a one-sided crush on Neal.
- Ashley Spillers as Janice Swift, the new secretary for North Jackson High.
- Susan Park as Christine Russell, Lee's wife.
- June Kyoto Lu as Mi Cha, Lee's mother-in-law.
- Mike O'Gorman as Bill Hayden, a history teacher at North Jackson High.
- Madelyn Cline as Taylor Watts (season 1), Spirit Captain at North Jackson High.
- James M. Connor as Martin Seychelles, a drama teacher at North Jackson High
- Robin Bartlett as Octavia LeBlanc, an English teacher at North Jackson High
- Brian Howe as Jeremy Haas, superintendent of the school district.
- RJ Cyler as Luke Brown, Brown's older son.
- Jennifer Gatti as Mrs. Deets
- Brian Tyree Henry as Dascious Brown (season 1), Belinda Brown's estranged husband.
- Marcius Harris as Officer Terrence Willows (season 2), the school security guard.
- Alexandra McVicker as Robin Shandrell (season 2), a delinquent student who Neal expelled from North Jackson prior to the beginning of the series.
- Fisher Stevens as Brian Biehn (season 2), Amanda's new boyfriend, a successful novelist and lecturer.
- Christopher Thornton as Mr. Milner (season 2), a science teacher and amateur cartoonist at North Jackson.

== Episodes ==
Season	Episodes	Originally released	
Season	Episodes	First released	Last released
1	9	July 17, 2016	September 18, 2016
2	9	September 17, 2017	November 12, 2017

=== Season 1 (2016) ===
No. overall	No. in season	Title	Directed by	Written by	Original release date	US viewers (millions)
1	1	"The Principal"	Jody Hill	Danny R. McBride & Jody Hill	July 17, 2016	1.15
After their principal (Bill Murray in a cameo) resigns, Vice Principals Neal Gamby and Lee Russell face off for the newly opened position. Both, however, are distraught when they meet the new principal, Dr. Belinda Brown, and agree to team up to take her down.
2	2	"A Trusty Steed"	Jody Hill	Danny R. McBride & John Carcieri	July 24, 2016	0.794
Dr. Brown begins to get under Gamby's skin as she hires someone to evaluate both him and Russell.
3	3	"The Field Trip"	Danny McBride	Danny R. McBride & John Carcieri & Adam Countee	July 31, 2016	0.889
In an attempt to get closer to teacher Amanda Snodgrass, Gamby agrees to go on an out of town field trip.
4	4	"Run for the Money"	Jody Hill	Danny R. McBride & John Carcieri & Jeff Fradley	August 7, 2016	0.708
As their homecoming football game approaches, Russell uses it as an opportunity to take down Dr. Brown, though Gamby is worried it will have negative consequences for the school.
5	5	"Circles"	Jody Hill	Danny R. McBride & John Carcieri & Hayes Davenport	August 14, 2016	0.819
After Gamby sabotages their latest venture, he and Russell cut ties. Dr. Brown works with Gamby to tone down his disciplinary methods. Russell faces some problems at home.
6	6	"The Foundation of Learning"	Jody Hill	Danny R. McBride & John Carcieri & Ben Dougan	August 21, 2016	0.854
Gamby and Russell create an elaborate scheme to turn the school against Dr. Brown. Gamby, eager to get closer to his daughter, learns motocross, with the help of Snodgrass.
7	7	"The Good Book"	Jody Hill	Danny R. McBride & John Carcieri & Hayes Davenport	August 28, 2016	0.620
At teacher workday, Dr. Brown has Russell watch her mischievous sons. Gamby and Snodgrass get closer. Dr. Brown's ex-husband returns.
8	8	"Gin"	Jody Hill	Danny R. McBride & John Carcieri & Tim Saccardo	September 11, 2016	0.630
Gamby must decide who he is loyal to as Dr. Brown offers him a new, more respectable role and reveals she plans on firing Russell. His relationship with Snodgrass is complicated as he learns that she used to sleep with a different teacher at the school.
9	9	"End of the Line"	Jody Hill	Danny R. McBride & John Carcieri	September 18, 2016	0.555
Gamby and Russell blackmail Dr. Brown, resulting in a shake up on the school staff. Gamby and Snodgrass are still not talking.

=== Season 2 (2017) ===
No. overall	No. in season	Title	Directed by	Written by	Original release date	US viewers (millions)
10	1	"Tiger Town"	David Gordon Green	Danny R. McBride & John Carcieri & Tim Saccardo	September 17, 2017	0.711
Recovering from his wounds, Gamby returns to a very different North Jackson High School.
11	2	"Slaughter"	David Gordon Green	Danny R. McBride & John Carcieri & Ben Dougan	September 24, 2017	0.670
Gamby fingers a suspect, with Dayshawn's help. Russell tests out a kindness strategy at school.
12	3	"The King"	David Gordon Green	Danny R. McBride & John Carcieri & Adam Countee	October 1, 2017	0.892
Gamby confronts Snodgrass' new boyfriend. Russell tries to find out who drew a cruel picture of him.
13	4	"Think Change"	David Gordon Green	Danny R. McBride & John Carcieri & Jeff Fradley	October 8, 2017	0.654
Gamby is principal for the day while Russell attends his father's funeral. The teachers complain about the new fitness instructors.
14	5	"A Compassionate Man"	David Gordon Green	Danny R. McBride & John Carcieri & Jeff Fradley	October 15, 2017	0.700
Russell's birthday party ends in disaster when Christine invites an old friend; Gamby tries to show his charitable side.
15	6	"The Most Popular Boy"	David Gordon Green	Danny R. McBride & John Carcieri & Hayes Davenport	October 22, 2017	0.647
Gamby discovers the other teachers except for Snodgrass are planning to get Russell fired.
16	7	"Spring Break"	David Gordon Green	Danny R. McBride & John Carcieri & Jeff Fradley	October 29, 2017	0.604
Gamby and Russell accompany Janelle and her friends on spring break.
17	8	"Venetian Nights"	Danny McBride	Danny R. McBride & John Carcieri & Jeff Fradley	November 5, 2017	0.610
Tensions come to a head for Gamby and Russell as prom approaches.
18	9	"The Union of the Wizard & The Warrior"	David Gordon Green	Danny R. McBride & John Carcieri & Jeff Fradley	November 12, 2017	0.792
The school year comes to a roaring end; Gamby's shooter is revealed.

== Production ==
Season 1 poster featuring Walton Goggins and Danny McBride

The series was ordered by HBO with an 18-episode pickup in May 2014, and the series was split into two seasons for a designed finite run. Filming happened during June 2015 in Park Circle, a neighborhood of North Charleston, South Carolina. Will Ferrell and Bill Murray were reported to be making cameo appearances in the series. Scenes that take place in the school were shot on the campus of R. B. Stall High School and also filmed on campus of West Ashley High School.

The series premiered on July 17, 2016. The second and final season premiered on September 17, 2017, and concluded on November 12, 2017.

=== Music ===
The score was composed by Joseph Stephens. The soundtrack was released by Waxwork Records in 2019 on a double LP pressed to 180-gram vinyl. The release included liner notes by McBride and Stephens.

== Reception ==
On Rotten Tomatoes, season 1 has a rating of 66%, based on 41 reviews, with an average rating of 6.5/10. The site's critical consensus reads, "Vice Principals is sporadically amusing and benefits from its talented stars, but its mean-spirited humor sometimes misses the mark." On Metacritic, the season has a score of 56 out of 100, based on 31 critics, indicating "mixed or average reviews". Season 2 has a 100% rating on Rotten Tomatoes with an average rating of 7/10 based on 11 reviews. The site's critical consensus reads, "Danny McBride and Walton Goggins return to settle unfinished business in a Vice Principals season two that is both obscenely funny and more satisfying than its predecessor."

=== Accolades ===
Year	Award	Category	Episode	Nominee(s)	Result	Ref.
2018	Critics' Choice Television Awards	Best Supporting Actor in a Comedy Series		Walton Goggins	Won	
2018	Primetime Emmy Awards	Best Sound Editing for a Comedy or Drama Series (Half-Hour) and Animation	"The Union of the Wizard & the Warrior"	George Haddad, Dale Chaloukian, Karyn Foster, Chad J. Hughes, Marc Meyer, Jim Gallivan, Michael Brake, Louie Schultz, Gregg Barbanell, Nancy Parker	Nominated	

== Home media ==
The complete first season of Vice Principals was released on DVD and Blu-ray by HBO Home Entertainment (which is distributed through Warner Home Video) on February 7, 2017. The complete series was released on DVD by HBO Home Entertainment on April 10, 2018.
