= Tim Saccardo =

American TV and film comedy writer

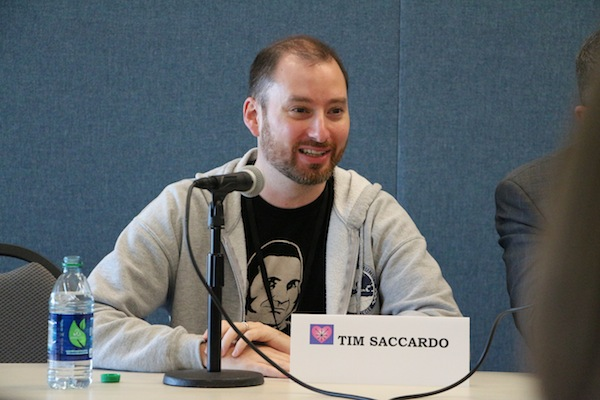
- Born: Tim Saccardo
- Occupation(s): Comedy writer, producer
- Years active: 2003–present
- Known for: Community, Vice Principals, American Dad!

Tim Saccardo is an American TV and film comedy writer best known for working on the NBC series Community for four out of its six seasons.

His other credits include the HBO series Vice Principals, the Fox/TBS series American Dad!, and the TBS series 10 Items or Less.

Tim is also a longtime writer and director of comedy shows at Hollywood's Upright Citizens Brigade Theatre.

== Early life and career ==
Tim was raised in Middletown, Rhode Island.
