= Ashley Spillers =

American actress (born 1986)

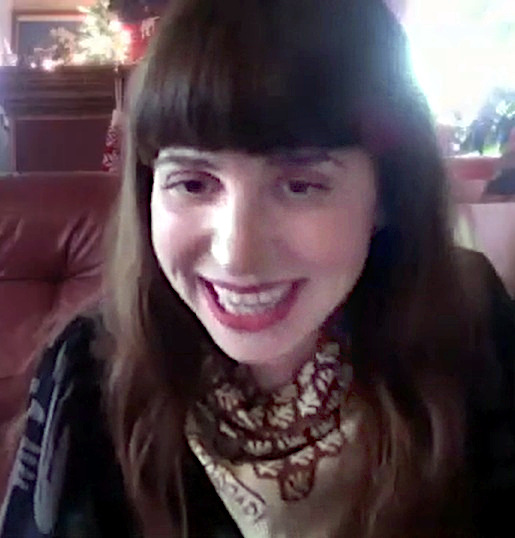
- Spillers in 2020
- Born: Ashley Rae Spillers; Houston, Texas, U.S.
- Occupations: Actress, comedian
- Years active: 2008–present

Ashley Rae Spillers is an American actress and comedian. She is best known for her film roles as Elizabeth in the 2013 comedy film Last Vegas (2013), Amy in the 2014 neo-noir thriller film Two Step (2014) and Olivia in the Netflix comedy film Father of the Year (2018).

Her television roles include Janice Swift in the HBO television series Vice Principals (2016–2017), Sydney Jones in the drama television series NCIS: Los Angeles (2017–2019), Emily in the television series Distance (2018), and Huggins in the comic science fiction web series Red vs. Blue (2018–2019).

Her voice roles include Didi Pickles in the 2021 revival animated series Rugrats and Jill in Muppet Babies.

== Early life ==
Spillers was born in Houston, Texas. She grew up in Sugar Land and she didn't become involved in theatre until she was either 11 or 12 years old.

She became influenced by the works made by famous celebrities, such as Holly Hunter for Broadcast News, Frances McDormand for Fargo, Mississippi Burning and Miller's Crossing, Melanie Lynskey, Bill Paxton for Apollo 13, Tom Hanks for Forrest Gump, Dianne Wiest, Toni Collette, Tom Cruise for Top Gun, A Few Good Men and Mission: Impossible, Bruce Willis for Die Hard and Armageddon, Bette Midler for Hocus Pocus, Cuba Gooding Jr. for Jerry Maguire, Jerry Orbach for Law & Order and Diane Keaton.

She took children's acting classes in Houston at the Town & Country Playhouse with actress Barbara Lasater. In 2004, she graduated from Kempner High School.

== Career ==
In 2009, she made her debut when she played the title character in the short film Adaline. In 2012, she played Nancy in her first leading role in the film Saturday Morning Mystery and voiced Sarah Steele in the video game Pirate101.

In 2013, she appeared as Tracy in the film Dear Sidewalk, and Elizabeth in the comedy film Last Vegas, featuring Michael Douglas, Robert De Niro, Kevin Kline and Morgan Freeman. In 2014, Spillers played Amy in the thriller film Two Step and Julie in the film Arlo and Julie.

She made guest appearances on television shows, including The Middle, Driving Arizona, American Woman and Splitting Up Together.

From 2016 to 2017, she played Janice Swift in the HBO drama television series Vice Principals, for 14 episodes. From 2017 to 2019, she played Sydney Jones, the sister of Renée Felice Smith's character, in the drama series NCIS: Los Angeles. From 2018 to 2019, she played Huggins in the science fiction web series Red vs. Blue, for 13 episodes.

In 2021, Spillers succeeded Melanie Chartoff as the voice of Didi Pickles in the Paramount+ reboot television series Rugrats.

== Personal life ==
In her interview for San Francisco News, she said: "I watched so many movies, and I was influenced by everyone I watched in a way. Every actor is so different, each bringing something unique to the table, so for a long time I don't think I played favorites, I just soaked everything in, and went on that ride, along for the story they were telling. Judy Garland was someone I watched over and over, in The Wizard of Oz of course. And that woman was ahead of her time, I guess. Who am I to say that, but, I guess I mean, I watch her now, and her performances are so raw and human and real. I don't know that I truly understood that as a kid, but I sure do now. She was special. I mean, A Star is Born? So good. Sigourney Weaver made an impression on me as Diane [sic] Fossey in Gorillas in the Mist. Her work in that is fierce, and she told Fossey's story in a beautiful way. She also instilled in me, from such a tiny age, a real love of gorillas, and an interest and dedication to them remaining on this planet. That's something I think every actor aims to do through their work, make a difference somehow, and she did for me. And now I care very deeply for and have come to know the struggle of a species that otherwise I might have not."

== Filmography ==
=== Film ===
Year	Title	Role	Notes
2009	Adaline	Adaline	Short film
2011	Wanted	Officer Spillers	Short film
2011	Slacker 2011	Recluse's Girlfriend	
2012	Magpie	Maggie	Short film Credited as Ashley Rae Spillers
2012	Saturday Morning Mystery	Nancy	Credited as Ashley Rae Spillers
2012	The Man from Orlando	Bikini Girl	
2012	Orbit	Audrey	Short film
2013	Pit Stop	Waitress	Uncredited
2013	Loves Her Gun	Xoe	Credited as Ashley Rae Spillers
2013	Love & Air Sex	Ellie	
2013	Hell No	Spring Break Girl #1	Short film
2013	Zero Charisma	Sarah	
2013	Hearts of Napalm	Ashley	Short film
2013	The Bystander Theory	Sheila	
2013	Last Vegas	Elizabeth	
2014	Co-Ed Campfire Carnage	Tanya (Freaky Friday 13)	
2014	Two Step	Amy	Credited as Ashley Rae Spillers
2014	Arlo and Julie	Julie	
2014	Tom: Monologue	Tom	Short film
2015	I'll See You in My Dreams	Vitamins Store Clerk	
2015	+/-	Ashley	Short film
2015	The Love Inside	Gemma	
2016	War Dogs	Rosen's Wife	
2016	The Meaning of Christmas (Cookies)		Short film
2017	Dr. Brinks & Dr. Brinks	Alex Brinks	
2017	Inheritance	Allie Bowman	
2018	Harpy Gee	Opal, Pumpkin, Baby Snail	Voice, short film
2018	Fetish	Carrie	Short film
2018	Ringu: Meme Origins	Rachel	Short film
2018	Don't Be a Hero	Samantha	Short film
2018	Father of the Year	Olivia	
2020	Keep Hope Alive	Terry	
2020	Glenda Goes Quiet	Glenda	Short film
2020	The Very Last Interview	Interviewer	Short film
2020	Authentic Personalities	Allie	Short film
2021	Bits and Pieces		Short film
2023	Foil	Gina The Bartender	Credited as Ashley Rae Spillers

=== Television ===
Year	Title	Role	Notes
2013	American Experience	Gerta S. Brown	Episode: "War of the Worlds"; Television documentary series
2015	Weird Loners	Kayla	Episode: "Weird Dance"
2016	Driving Arizona	Sarah Landry	Episode: "Dedication, Commitment, Perseverance, Perspiration"
2016	Maron	Carla	2 episodes
2016–17	Vice Principals	Janice Swift	14 episodes
2017	The Middle	Hannah	Episode: "Pitch Imperfect"
2017–19	NCIS: Los Angeles	HSS Sydney Jones	3 episodes Credited as Ashley Rae Spillers
2018	Distance	Emily	9 episodes
2018	American Woman	Leslie-Anne	Episode: "Jack"
2018	Splitting Up Together	Holly	Episode: "Yes, Deer"; Credited as Ashley Rae Spillers
2018–19	Red vs. Blue	Huggins	Voice, 13 episodes Credited as A.R. Spillers
2021–26	Rugrats	Didi Pickles	Voice, credited as Ashley Rae Spillers
2021–22	Muppet Babies	Jill the Frog	Voice, recurring role
2023	Bookie	Mrs. Miller	Episode: "A Square Job in a Round Hole"; Credited as Ashley Rae Spillers

=== Video games ===
Year	Title	Role	Notes
2012	Pirate101	Sarah Steele	
