= Susan Park =

American actress

- Born: United States
- Occupation: Actress
- Years active: 2009–present
- Known for: 1600 Penn; Vice Principals

Susan Park is an American actress.

== Early life ==
Park was born in the United States, the daughter of Korean immigrants.

== Career ==
Park began acting in 2009. In 2010, she performed in a one-woman show titled Diaries of a K-Town Diva directed by Barbara Tarbuck.

In 2013, Park joined the cast of ABC's Revenge and in 2014, she had a role in FX's Fargo.

== Filmography ==
=== Film ===
Year	Title	Role	Notes
2009	The Lifeboat	Sarah	Short film
2009	The Film You Did Not See	Jean	
2009	Clubophobia	Sarah	Short film
2013	Cleaner		Short film
2014	Electric Slide	Marilyn D	
2014	Phantom Halo	Grace	
2016	Ghostbusters	Flashed Woman	
2017	Unicorn Store	Angie	
2019	Always Be My Maybe	Judy Kim	
2019	William	Sarah	
2025	Twinless	Sage	

=== Television ===
Year	Title	Role	Notes
2009	The Unusuals	Dr. Monica Crumb	Recurring role (4 episodes)
2010	Three Rivers	Sanegun	Episode: "Case Histories"
2010	CSI: Crime Scene Investigation	Paige	Episode: S11e9 "Wild Life"
2011	The Bold and the Beautiful	Lesley	2 episodes
2011	Law & Order: LA	Lee Min Ho	Episode: "Carthay Circle"
2011	Reed Between the Lines	Constance McDonaugh	Episode: "Let's Talk About Dishonesty"
2011	It's Always Sunny in Philadelphia	Woman	Episode: "The Gang Gets Trapped"
2012	Bent	Simone	Episode: "Pilot"
2013	1600 Penn	Stacey Kim	Recurring role (5 episodes)
2013	Revenge	Falcon / Edith	Episodes: "Identity", "Engagement"
2014	Fargo	Linda Park	Recurring role (5 episodes)
2015	Castle	Mei Wu	Episode: S7e17 "Hong Kong Hustle"
2015–16	Life in Pieces	Dr. Sally Hong	Episodes: S1e1 "Pilot", S1e6 "Ponzi Sex Paris Bounce", S1e22 "CryTunes Divorce Tablet Ring"
2015–17	Fresh Off the Boat	Connie Chen	5 episodes
2016–17	Vice Principals	Christine Russell	12 episodes
2016–17	The Good Place	Pevita	2 episodes
2017	The Mick	Liz	Recurring role
2017	Speechless	Carly	Episode: "O-s-Oscar P-a-Party"
2018	Hawaii Five-0	Noriko Noshimuri	2 episodes
2020	Snowpiercer	Jinju	Main role (Season 1)
2020	Briarpatch	Daphne Owens	5 episodes
