= James M. Connor =

American actor

- Born: James Michael Connor; June 16, 1960 (age 66); Omaha, Nebraska, United States
- Occupation: Actor
- Years active: 1976-present

James Michael Connor (born June 16, 1960, in Omaha, Nebraska) is an American actor who, making his film debut as a supporting character in the 1976 science fiction film Futureworld, has played recurring characters on several television series including Buffy the Vampire Slayer and The King of Queens, and FCU: Fact Checkers Unit (2010), as well as guest appearances on The X-Files, The Drew Carey Show, Desperate Housewives, Gilmore Girls, Rules of Engagement (2010), and Scrubs (2002). More recently, Connor has appeared on TV in Brooklyn Nine-Nine (2013-2014), Community (2012-2014), Franklin & Bash (2014), Parks and Recreation (2012-2015,) and Vice Principals (2016-2017).

Connor has also appeared in feature films such as About Schmidt, Blades of Glory, and Watchmen, and in the short films The Yard Sale and Pendulum. Other movie roles include The Perfect 46 (2014), and Dream World (2012).

== Commercials and voiceovers ==
In late-2014 Connor appeared as Larry Culpepper in Dr. Pepper TV commercials tied to the NCAA college football playoffs. Connor has also contributed voiceovers for the video games Marvel Heroes (2013), The 3rd Birthday (2011), Cloudy with a Chance of Meatballs (2009), and Gun (2005).

He attended Creighton Preparatory School in Omaha, Nebraska, with his friend, the director Alexander Payne.
