= Georgia King =

British actress

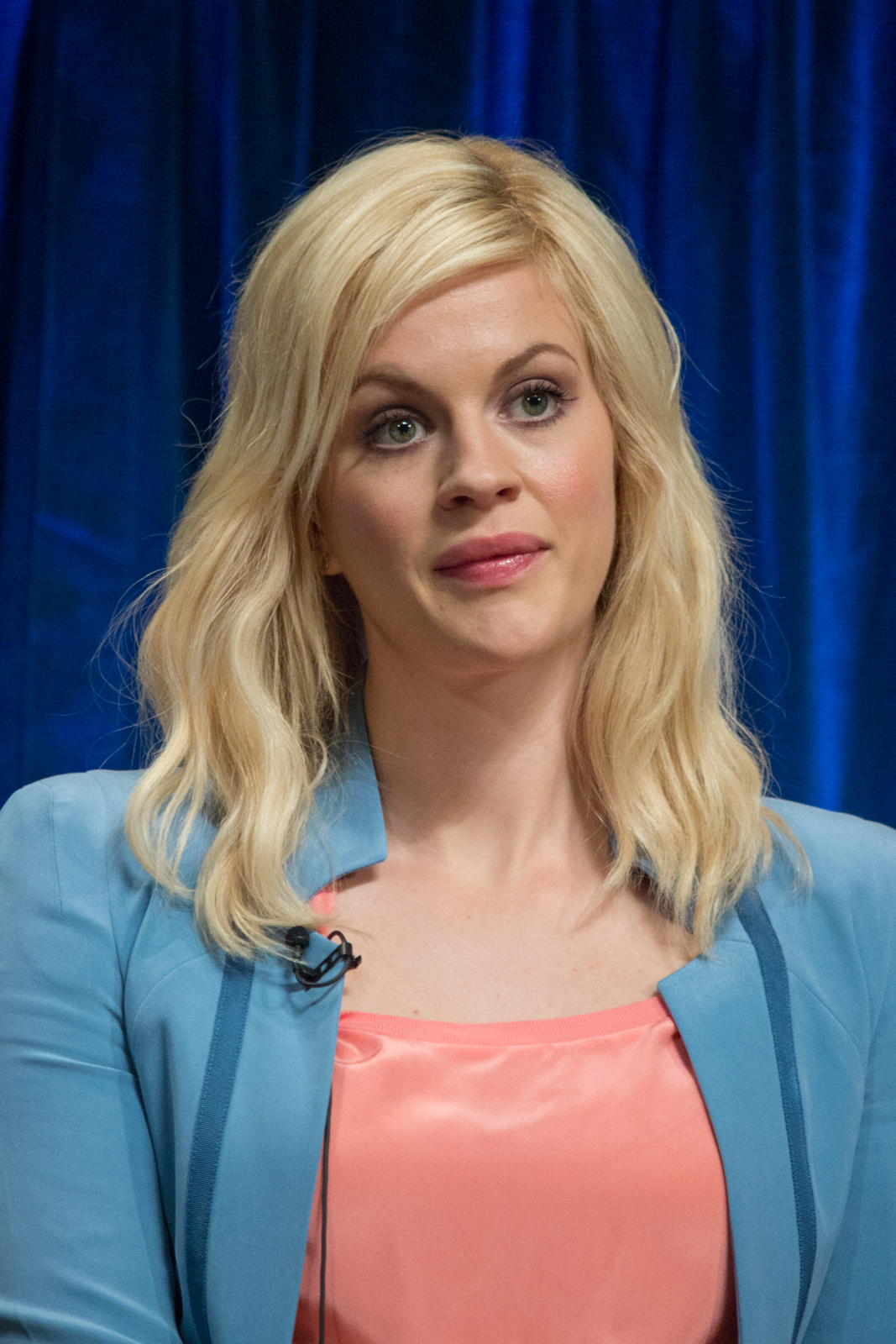
- King at the PaleyFest 2013 panel for The New Normal
- Born: Edinburgh, Scotland
- Occupation: Actress
- Years active: 2006–present
- Children: 1
- Parents: Jonathan Hyde; Isobel Buchanan

Georgia King is a British actress. She played the role of Amanda Snodgrass in the HBO series Vice Principals.

== Early life ==
Born in Edinburgh, King is the daughter of Australian actor Jonathan Hyde and Scottish opera singer Isobel Buchanan.

== Career ==
Although King grew up dreaming of being a director, she got her break into acting when she was 18 and working at a cheese shop, making her professional debut as Rosamond Oliver in Jane Eyre. It was her very first audition "and I booked it," she said. "I was like, 'Oh my Lord, this is amazing!'" However, she was nearly unable to play the role. A week before filming was to begin, King's appendix ruptured. It was unlikely she would recover from the operation to remove it for at least ten days. Another actress was cast, but King recovered in time and was able to get the required medical clearance to film.

She appeared as Goldie, a surrogate mother in the American sitcom, The New Normal. She played the tyrannical head-girl Harriet Bentley in 2008's Wild Child, and the cruel, conniving Sophie in the 2009 slasher film Tormented. Also in 2009 King portrayed the manipulative Victoria in the film Tanner Hall. She also performed in One Night in November at the Belgrade Theatre in Coventry, from October to November 2010, as well as being featured in the 2011 film Chalet Girl. She appeared as Princess Elena in the episode "The Changeling" of the third series of the BBC's Merlin. She appeared in the comedy horror film Cockneys vs Zombies as a bank robbery hostage trying to escape from a zombie-infested London.

King also appeared as series regular Amanda Snodgrass across both seasons in the 2016–2017 HBO comedy Vice Principals.

== Filmography ==
=== Film ===
Year	Title	Role
2008	Wild Child	Harriet Bentley
2008	The Duchess	Lady Teazle
2009	The Academy	Khloe
2009	Tormented	Sophia
2009	Tanner Hall	Victoria
2009	St Trinian's 2: The Legend of Fritton's Gold	Juliet
2009	The Academy Part 2: First Impressions	Khloe
2010	Burke & Hare	Emma
2011	Chalet Girl	Jules
2011	One Day	Suki Meadows
2012	Eliminate: Archie Cookson	Lucy
2012	Cockneys vs Zombies	Emma
2013	Austenland	Lady Amelia Heartwright
2015	Kill Your Friends	Rebecca
2018	Parallel	Leena
2020	The Lost Husband	Jessica

=== Television ===
Year	Title	Role	Notes
2006	Jane Eyre	Rosamond Oliver	2 episodes
2007	The History of Mr Polly	Christabel	Television film
2007	The Shadow in the North	Lady Mary	Television film
2008	Little Dorrit	Pet Meagles	Main role
2009	Plus One	Astrid	Episode: "One Love"
2009	Free Agents	Jodie	1 episode
2009	Off the Hook	Weird Bloke	3 episodes
2010	Agatha Christie's Poirot	Frances Drake	Episode: "Hallowe'en Party"
2010	Merlin	Princess Elena	Episode: "The Changeling"
2011	Sugartown	Carmen	3 episodes
2011	Felix and Murdo	Winnie	Episode: "Christmas Special"
2012	Sinbad	Roisin	Episode: "The Siren"
2012	Skins	Clara	Episode: "Finale"
2012–2013	The New Normal	Goldie Clemmons	Main role
2015	Vicious	Jess	2 episodes
2016–2017	Vice Principals	Amanda Snodgrass	Main role
2020	Royalties	Kendra	Main role
2020	Devs	Lianne	4 episodes
2021	Wolfboy and the Everything Factory	William's Mom	2 episodes
2022	Star Trek: Lower Decks	Petra Aberdeen (voice)	3 episodes
2026	Scarpetta		Post-production
