= Edi Patterson =

American actress and writer

- Education: Southwest Texas State University
- Occupations: Actress; writer
- Years active: 1995–present

Edi Patterson is an American actress and writer. She has primarily acted in comedies. She is best known for portraying Fran in the film Knives Out (2019), Veronica in the FX series Partners (2014), Jen Abbott in the HBO series Vice Principals (2016–2017), and Judy Gemstone in the HBO series The Righteous Gemstones (2019–2025).

== Early life ==
Edi Patterson is from Texas City, Texas. Her mother was a teacher and her father was a plumber. She graduated from Southwest Texas State University, obtaining a theater Bachelor of Arts in 1997.

== Career ==
After graduating from college in 1997, Patterson moved to Austin and became involved in the city's developing improvisational theatre scene. She performed Theatresports and the improv format Gorilla at Hyde Park Theatre while The Hideout Theatre was being renovated, and also worked with the Austin theatre company Rude Mechanicals. Around 2000, she moved to Los Angeles, continued performing improv, and trained at The Groundlings, where she progressed from improvisation into sketch writing.

Her early screen work included performing and writing for The Underground in 2006 and playing Veronica opposite Kelsey Grammer in Partners in 2014. Patterson later described her role as Jen Abbott in the HBO series Vice Principals as her breakout. The part was initially planned for four episodes, but was expanded during the series after she developed a strong comic rapport with co-creator and co-star Danny McBride.

In 2019, Patterson began playing Judy Gemstone in the HBO series The Righteous Gemstones. McBride developed the character with Patterson in mind after the two had worked together on Vice Principals and subsequently collaborated as writers. Patterson also joined the ensemble cast of the mystery film Knives Out, which premiered at the 2019 Toronto International Film Festival.

== Personal life ==
Patterson is married to actor and improviser Dan O'Connor.

== Filmography ==
=== Film ===
Key
†	Denotes films that have not yet been released

Year	Title	Role	Notes
1998	Legend of Crystania: The Motion Picture	Pirotess / Sheru	Voice, English version
1999	City Hunter: .357 Magnum	Nina Shutenberg	Voice, English version
2000	In Flagrante	Mia	
2000	The Distinct Smell of Red	Juliet	
2007	Jesus People	Gloria Hamming	Short
2009	Jesus People: The Movie	Gloria Hamming	
2010	Screwball: The Ted Whitfield Story	Fran Whitfield	
2010	Darnell Dawkins: Mouth Guitar Legend	Mary	
2011	Thanks	Edi	
2011	Mars Needs Moms	Additional voices	Voice
2011	Poolboy: Drowning Out the Fury	Peters	
2011	Under the Covers		Short
2011	That's What Friends Are For	Lisa	Short
2012	A Thousand Words	Young Female Agent	
2012	The Naut	Beryl	Short
2015	Raise the ToyGantic	Jane Jobe	Short
2015	You're Killing Me	Emma	
2015	The Ladykiller	Woman #4	Short
2015	Helen Keller vs. Nightwolves	Peters	
2019	Troop Zero	Miss Aimee	
2019	Knives Out	Fran	
2019	Between Two Ferns: The Movie	Shirl Clarts	
2020	We Bare Bears: The Movie	Additional voices	
2021	Plan B	Doris	
2021	The Guilty	Katherine Harbor	Voice
2021	The Starling	Margie	
2022	Violent Night	Alva	
2024	Thelma the Unicorn	Megan	Voice
2024	Nutcrackers	Rose	
2026	Brian	TBA	
2026	Bad Day †	TBA	Completed

=== Television ===
Year	Title	Role	Notes
1998	Legend of Crystania: The Chaos Ring	Pirotess / Sheru	Voice, English version
2001	CSI: Crime Scene Investigation	Rosalyn Dudek	Episode: "Too Tough to Die"
2003	Ask Rita		4 episodes
2006	Jimmy Kimmel Live!	Mary Magdalene	Episode: "Episode #4.191"
2006	The Underground	Various	11 episodes; also writer
2007	The Showbiz Show with David Spade	Correspondent	2 episodes
2007	Stop It	Jill	Episode: "Episode #1.5"
2007	Case Closed	Dezire	Television film
2008	Unhitched	Angry Woman	Episode: "Yorkshire Terrier Sucked Into the Internet"
2008	Young Person's Guide to History	Sexy Nurse #1 / Police Woman at Dinner	Episode: "Part 1"
2009	Popzilla	Various	Voice
2009	Waiting to Die	Claire	Television film
2011	Weeds	Yvonne	Episode: "Game-Played"
2011	Curb Your Enthusiasm	Vet's Wife	Episode: "Vow of Silence"
2011	Pair of Kings	Charlotte	Episode: "Sleepless in the Castle"
2011	The Exes	Sandy	Episode: "Pilot"
2011	St. James St. James Presents: Delirium Cinema	Peters	Television film
2011	Holiday Engagement	Sophie	Television film
2012	The New Normal	Wilbur's Mom	Episode: "Baby Clothes"
2012	2 Broke Girls	Janis	Episode: "And the Cupcake War"
2013	Californication	Shannon	Episode: "Blind Faith"
2013	Family Bum	Sheila	Episode: "Reading Is Fun"
2013	Super Fun Night	Marika	Unaired pilot
2014	Partners	Verushka / Veronica	10 episodes
2014	The League	Shauna	Episode: "Breast Awareness Month"
2015	Clinical Trials	Joan-Ruth Allen	4 episodes
2015	Black-ish	Laura	4 episodes
2015	Mike Tyson Mysteries	Courtney Baynes	Voice, episode: "She's a Bayniac"
2015–2018	We Bare Bears	Additional voices	Voice, 25 episodes; also writer
2016–2017	Vice Principals	Jen Abbott	15 episodes
2018; 2021	The Last O.G.	Elizabeth	7 episodes
2018	Nobodies	Mrs. Cooper	Episode: "Meeting Steven Spielberg"
2019–2025	The Righteous Gemstones	Judy Gemstone	31 episodes; also writer
2020	Infinity Train	Scout Pinecone Leader / Rock #1	Voice, episode: "The Campfire Car"
2020–2021	The Fungies!	Mertha, Anna Nanna	Voice, 33 episodes
2021	Calls	Darlene	Voice, episode: "Me, Myself, and Darlene"
2021	Adventure Time: Distant Lands	Momdebra / Cat Student	Voice, episode: "Wizard City"
2021	Ten Year Old Tom	Tom's Mom	Voice, 10 episodes
2021	Teenage Euthanasia	Sophie	Voice, 2 episodes
2022	Kung Fu	Gwen	Episode: "Year of the Tiger"
2022	Battle Kitty	Jangel / Angelions	Voice, episode: "Acidic Dunes"
2022	Made for Love	Dawn Fairbanks	Episode: "Another Byron, Another Hazel"
2022	The Simpsons	Jessica	Voice, episode: "Meat Is Murder"
2022	Fairfax	Various voices	3 episodes
2022–2023	The Great North	Stacy B / Jackie	Voice, 4 episodes
2023	Harley Quinn	Veronica Cale	Voice, 4 episodes
2024–2025	Resident Alien	Heather / Blue Avian	6 episodes
2024	Knuckles	Wanda Whipple	4 episodes
2025	Last Week Tonight with John Oliver	Eileen Bailey	Episode: "Immigration"
2025	Super Duper Bunny League	Long Tall Sally	Voice, episode "Long Tall Sally"
2025	It's Florida, Man	Natalie	Episode: "Cuckoo Girl"
2026	President Curtis	Carolyn Gladyssmer	Voice; 2 episodes
2026	Dang!	Jane Atkinson	Voice
2026	Abbott Elementary	Abby	Episode: "Halloween Party"

=== Anime ===
Year	Title	Role	Notes
1996	Variable Geo	Yuka Takeuchi	Voice, English version
1998	Tekken: The Motion Picture	Jun Kazama	Voice, English version
2012	Zombie Apocalypse	Zombie	

=== Music videos ===
Year	Title	Artist	Notes
2022	"Try Jesus"	Elle King	Director/Store greeter

== Awards and nominations ==
Year	Award	Category	Nominated work	Result	Ref.
2019	Hollywood Music in Media Awards	Best Original Song in a TV Show or Limited Series	The Righteous Gemstones (song: "Misbehavin'")	Nominated	
2022	Hollywood Critics Association TV Awards	Best Writing in a Broadcast Network or Cable Series, Comedy	The Righteous Gemstones	Nominated	
2023	Satellite Awards	Best Actress – Television Series Musical or Comedy	The Righteous Gemstones	Nominated	
2026	31st Critics' Choice Awards	Best Actress in a Comedy Series	The Righteous Gemstones	Nominated	
