= List of films at the 2011 Sundance Film Festival =

The following is a list of all films shown at the 27th Sundance Film Festival.

== Feature competition ==
The following films were shown in competition at the 27th Sundance Film Festival.

=== U.S. Documentary ===
The following 16 films were selected from 841 submissions and each is a world premiere.

Title	Director	Year	First showing
Beats, Rhymes & Life: The Travels of a Tribe Called Quest	Michael Rapaport	2011	January 22
Being Elmo: A Puppeteer's Journey	Constance Marks	2011	January 23
Buck	Cindy Meehl	2010	January 21
Connected: An Autoblogography About Love, Death & Technology	Tiffany Shlain	2011	January 21
Crime After Crime	Yoav Potash	2011	January 23
Hot Coffee	Susan Saladoff	2010	January 24
How to Die in Oregon	Peter D. Richardson	2010	January 23
If a Tree Falls: A Story of the Earth Liberation Front	Marshall Curry	2011	January 21
The Last Mountain	Bill Haney	2011	January 21
Miss Representation	Jennifer Siebel Newsom	2011	January 22
Page One: A Year Inside the New York Times	Andrew Rossi	2010	January 23
The Redemption of General Butt Naked	Eric Strauss, Daniele Anastasion	2010	January 22
Resurrect Dead: The Mystery of the Toynbee Tiles	Jon Foy	2011	January 24
Sing Your Song	Susanne Rostock	2011	January 20
Troubadours	Morgan Neville	2010	January 22
We Were Here	David Weissman	2010	January 22

=== U.S. Dramatic ===
The following 16 films were selected from 1,102 submissions and each is a world premiere.

Title	Director	Year	First showing
Another Earth	Mike Cahill	2011	January 24
Another Happy Day	Sam Levinson	2011	January 23
Benavides Born (distributed as All She Can)	Amy Wendel	2011	January 22
Circumstance	Maryam Keshavarz	2011	January 22
Gun Hill Road	Rashaad Ernesto Green	2011	January 24
Here	Braden King	2010	January 21
Higher Ground	Vera Farmiga	2010	January 23
Homework	Gavin Wiesen	2010	January 23
The Ledge	Matthew Chapman	2010	January 21
Like Crazy	Drake Doremus	2011	January 22
Little Birds	Elgin James	2010	January 23
Martha Marcy May Marlene	Sean Durkin	2011	January 21
On the Ice	Andrew Okpeaha MacLean	2011	January 21
Pariah	Dee Rees	2011	January 20
Take Shelter	Jeff Nichols	2011	January 24
Terri	Azazel Jacobs	2011	January 22

=== World Cinema Documentary ===
The following 12 films were selected from 796 submissions.

Title	Director	Year	First showing
An African Election	Jarreth Merz	2010	January 23
The Bengali Detective	Philip Cox	2010	January 22
The Black Power Mixtape 1967–1975	Göran Hugo Olsson	2011	January 21
Family Portrait in Black and White	Julia Ivanova	2011	January 23
The Flaw	David Sington	2010	January 21
The Green Wave	Ali Samadi Ahadi	2010	January 21
Hell and Back Again	Danfung Dennis	2010	January 23
Knuckle	Ian Palmer	2011	January 21
Position Among the Stars (Dutch: Stand van de Sterren)	Leonard Retel Helmrich	2010	January 21
Project Nim	James Marsh	2011	January 20
Senna	Asif Kapadia	2010	January 21
Shut Up Little Man! An Audio Misadventure	Matthew Bate	2011	January 22

=== World Cinema Dramatic ===
The following 14 films were selected from 1,073 submissions.

Title	Director	Year	First showing
Abraxas (Japanese: Aburakurasu no matsuri)	Naoki Katô	2010	January 21
All Your Dead Ones (Spanish: Todos tus muertos)	Carlos Moreno	2010	January 25
The Cinema Hold Up (Spanish: Asalto al cine)	Iria Gómez Concheiro	2011	January 2
A Few Days of Respite (French: Quelques jours de répit)	Amor Hakkar	2010	January 25
The Guard	John Michael McDonagh	2010	January 20
Happy, Happy (Norwegian: Sykt lykkelig)	Anne Sewitsky	2010	January 2
Kinyarwanda	Alrick Brown	2011	January 24
Lost Kisses (Italian: I baci mai dati)	Roberta Torre	2010	January 21
Mad Bastards	Brendan Fletcher	2010	January 24
Restoration (Hebrew: Boker tov adon fidelman)	Yossi (Joseph) Madmoni	2010	January 21
The Salesman (French: Le vendeur)	Sébastien Pilote	2011	January 21
Ticket to Paradise (Spanish: Boleto al paraiso)	Gerardo Chijona Valdes	2010	January 22
Tyrannosaur	Paddy Considine	2010	January 21
Vampire	Iwai Shunji	2010	January 22

== Non-competition features ==
=== Premieres ===
Title	Country	Director	Writer	Year	Minutes	Debut	Cast	URL
Cedar Rapids	U.S.A.	Miguel Arteta	Phil Johnston	2010	86	Jan 23	Ed Helms, John C. Reilly, Anne Heche, Isiah Whitlock, Jr., Alia Shawkat, Sigourney Weaver	sundance imdb
Flypaper	U.S.A.	Rob Minkoff	Jon Lucas, Scott Moore	2010	85	Jan 28	Patrick Dempsey, Ashley Judd, Mekhi Phifer, Jeffrey Tambor, Tim Blake Nelson, Pruitt Taylor Vince	sundance imdb
I Melt with You	Canada, U.S.A.	Mark Pellington	Glenn Porter, based on the story by Glenn Porter and Mark Pellington	2011	125	Jan 26	Thomas Jane, Jeremy Piven, Rob Lowe, Christian McKay, Carla Gugino, Sasha Grey	sundance imdb
Life in a Day	United Kingdom	Kevin Macdonald		2011	90	Jan 27		sundance imdb
Margin Call	U.S.A.	J.C. Chandor	J.C. Chandor	2010	109	Jan 25	Kevin Spacey, Paul Bettany, Jeremy Irons, Zachary Quinto, Demi Moore, Stanley Tucci	sundance imdb
Our Idiot Brother	U.S.A.	Jesse Peretz	Evgenia Peretz, David Schisgall	2010	95	Jan 22	Paul Rudd, Elizabeth Banks, Zooey Deschanel, Emily Mortimer	sundance imdb
Perfect Sense	United Kingdom	David MacKenzie	Kim Fupz Aakeson	2011	88	Jan 24	Ewan McGregor, Eva Green, Ewen Bremner, Stephen Dillane, Denis Lawson, Connie Nielsen	sundance imdb
Red State	U.S.A.	Kevin Smith	Kevin Smith	2011	96	Jan 23	Michael Angarano, Kerry Bishé, Nicholas Braun, Kyle Gallner, John Goodman, Melissa Leo, Michael Parks, Kevin Pollak, Stephen Root	sundance imdb
Salvation Boulevard	U.S.A.	George Ratliff	Doug Max Stone, George Ratliff, based on the novel by Larry Beinhart	2010	95	Jan 24	Pierce Brosnan, Jennifer Connelly, Ed Harris, Greg Kinnear, Marisa Tomei	sundance imdb
The Convincer	U.S.A.	Jill Sprecher	Jill Sprecher and Karen Sprecher	2010	109	Jan 25	Greg Kinnear, Alan Arkin, Billy Crudup, David Harbour, Lea Thompson, Bob Balaban	sundance imdb
The Details	U.S.A.	Jacob Aaron Estes	Jacob Aaron Estes	2010	91	Jan 24	Tobey Maguire, Elizabeth Banks, Laura Linney, Ray Liotta, Dennis Haysbert, Kerry Washington	sundance imdb
The Devil's Double	Belgium	Lee Tamahori	Michael Thomas	2010	108	Jan 22	Dominic Cooper, Ludivine Sagnier, Mimoun Oaïssa, Raad Rawi, Philip Quast	sundance imdb
The Future	Germany, U.S.A.	Miranda July	Miranda July	2011	91	Jan 21	Hamish Linklater, Miranda July, David Warshofsky, Isabella Acres, Joe Putterlik	sundance imdb
The Music Never Stopped	U.S.A.	Jim Kohlberg	Gwyn Lurie, Gary Marks, based on the story "The Last Hippie" by Oliver Sacks	2010	105	Jan 21	J. K. Simmons, Julia Ormond, Cara Seymour, Lou Taylor Pucci, Mía Maestro	sundance imdb
The Son of No One	U.S.A.	Dito Montiel	Dito Montiel	2010	95	Jan 28	Channing Tatum, Tracy Morgan, Katie Holmes, Ray Liotta with Juliette Binoche and Al Pacino	sundance imdb
Win Win	U.S.A.	Tom McCarthy	Tom McCarthy, based on the story by Tom McCarthy and Joe Tiboni	2010	106	Jan 21	Paul Giamatti, Amy Ryan, Bobby Cannavale, Jeffrey Tambor	sundance imdb

=== Documentary premieres ===
Title	Country	Director	Writer	Year	Minutes	Debut	Cast	URL
Becoming Chaz	U.S.A.	Fenton Bailey, Randy Barbato		2010	88	Jan 23		sundance imdb
Bobby Fischer Against the World	U.S.A.	Liz Garbus		2010	93	Jan 21		sundance imdb
Granito	U.S.A.	Pamela Yates	Peter Kinoy, Pamela Yates, Paco de Onís	2011	103	Jan 25		sundance imdb
Magic Trip	U.S.A.	Alison Ellwood, Alex Gibney		2010	90	Jan 28		sundance imdb
Reagan	U.S.A., United Kingdom	Eugene Jarecki		2011	105	Jan 23		sundance imdb
Rebirth	U.S.A.	Jim Whitaker		2010	104	Jan 21		sundance imdb
The Greatest Movie Ever Sold	U.S.A.	Morgan Spurlock	Jeremy Chilnick, Morgan Spurlock	2011	90	Jan 22		sundance imdb
The Interrupters	U.S.A.	Steve James		2011	162	Jan 21		sundance imdb
These Amazing Shadows	U.S.A.	Paul Mariano, Kurt Norton		2010	90	Jan 22		sundance imdb

=== Spotlight ===
Title	Country	Director	Writer	Year	Minutes	Debut	Cast	URL
Attenberg	Greece	Athina Rachel Tsangari	Athina Rachel Tsangari	2010	95	Jan 21	Ariane Labed, Vangelis Mourikis, Evangelia Randou, Yorgos Lanthimos	sundance imdb
Elite Squad 2	Brazil	José Padilha	Bráulio Mantovani	2010	120	Jan 23	Wagner Moura, André Ramiro, André Mattos, Sandro Rocha, Maria Ribeiro, Milhem Cortaz	sundance imdb
I Saw the Devil	South Korea	Kim Jee-woon	Park Hoon-jung	2010	141	Jan 21	Lee Byung-hun, Choi Min-sik	sundance imdb
In a Better World	Denmark, Sweden	Susanne Bier	Anders Thomas Jensen, based on a story by Susanne Bier and Anders Thomas Jensen	2010	113	Jan 21	Mikael Persbrandt, Trine Dyrholm, Ulrich Thomsen, Markus Rygaard, William Jøhnk Nielsen	sundance imdb
Incendies	Canada, France	Denis Villeneuve	Denis Villeneuve, in collaboration with Valérie Beaugrand-Champagne	2010	130	Jan 21	Lubna Azabal, Mélissa Désormeaux-Poulin, Maxim Gaudette, Rémy Girard	sundance imdb
Kaboom	U.S.A.	Gregg Araki	Gregg Araki	2010	85	Jan 21	Thomas Dekker, Haley Bennett, Chris Zylka, Roxane Mesquida, Juno Temple, Andy Fischer-Price	sundance imdb
Letters from the Big Man	U.S.A.	Christopher Münch	Christopher Münch	2011	115	Jan 23	Lily Rabe, Jason Butler Harner, Isaac C. Singleton Jr., Jim Cody Williams, Fiona Dourif, Karen Black	sundance imdb
Meek's Cutoff	U.S.A.	Kelly Reichardt	Jon Raymond	2010	104	Jan 21	Michelle Williams, Bruce Greenwood, Paul Dano, Zoe Kazan, Shirley Henderson, Rod Rondeaux	sundance imdb
Old Cats	Chile	Pedro Peirano, Sebastián Silva	Pedro Peirano, Sebastián Silva	2010	89	Jan 21	Belgica Castro, Claudia Celedon, Alejandro Sieveking, Catalina Saavedra, Alejandro Goic, Alicia Rodriguez	sundance imdb
Submarine	United Kingdom	Richard Ayoade	Richard Ayoade, based on the novel by Joe Dunthorne	2010	94	Jan 22	Craig Roberts, Paddy Considine, Sally Hawkins, Yasmin Paige, Noah Taylor	sundance imdb
Uncle Kent	U.S.A.	Joe Swanberg	Joe Swanberg, Kent Osborne	2010	72	Jan 21	Kent Osborne, Jennifer Prediger, Josephine Decker, Joe Swanberg, Kev	sundance imdb

=== NEXT ===
Title	Country	Director	Writer	Year	Minutes	Debut	Cast	URL
Bellflower	U.S.A.	Evan Glodell	Evan Glodell	2010	103	Jan 21	Evan Glodell, Jessie Wiseman, Tyler Dawson, Rebekah Brandes	sundance imdb
Lord Byron	U.S.A.	Zack Godshall	Zack Godshall, Ross Brupbacher	2011	91	Jan 24	Paul Batiste, Gwendolyn Spradling, Kayla Lemaire, Bria Hobgood, Eric Schexnayder, Justin Bickham	sundance imdb
Prairie Love	U.S.A.	Dusty Bias	Dusty Bias, Ashley Martin Bias, Holly Lynn Ellis	2010	80	Jan 23	Jeremy Clark, Holly Lynn Ellis, Garth Blomberg	sundance imdb
Restless City	U.S.A.	Andrew Dosunmu	Eugene Gussenhoven	2011	80	Jan 23	Danai Gurira, Anthony Okungbowa, Sy Alassane, Sky Grey, Babs Olusanmokun	sundance imdb
Sound of My Voice	U.S.A.	Zal Batmanglij	Zal Batmanglij, Brit Marling	2011	85	Jan 24	Brit Marling, Christopher Denham, Nicole Vicius, Avery Pohl	sundance imdb
The Lie	U.S.A.	Joshua Leonard	Joshua Leonard, Jeff Feuerzeig, Jess Weixler, Mark Webber	2010	80	Jan 22	Joshua Leonard, Jess Weixler, Mark Webber, Alia Shawkat, Jane Adams, Kelli Garner	sundance imdb
The Off Hours	U.S.A.	Megan Griffiths	Megan Griffiths	2010	93	Jan 22	Amy Seimetz, Ross Partridge, Tony Doupe, Scoot McNairy, Lynn Shelton, Gergana Mellin	sundance imdb
to.get.her	U.S.A.	Erica Dunton	Erica Dunton	2010	86	Jan 21	Jazzy de Lisser, Chelsea Logan, Adwoa Aboah, Audrey Speicher, Jami Eaton, Jill Jackson	sundance imdb

=== Park City at Midnight ===
Title	Country	Director	Writer	Year	Minutes	Debut	Cast	URL
Codependent Lesbian Space Alien Seeks Same	U.S.A.	Madeleine Olnek	Madeleine Olnek	2010	76	Jan 24	Lisa Haas, Susan Ziegler, Jackie Monahan, Cynthia Kaplan, Dennis Davis, Alex Karpovsky, Rae C Wright	sundance imdb
Corman's World: Exploits of a Hollywood Rebel	U.S.A.	Alex Stapleton		2011	101	Jan 21		sundance imdb
Hobo with a Shotgun	Canada	Jason Eisener	Johnathan Davies	2011	86	Jan 21	Rutger Hauer, Gregory Smith, Molly Dunsworth, Brian Downey, Nick Bateman	sundance imdb
Septien	U.S.A.	Michael Tully	Michael Tully	2011	79	Jan 23	Robert Longstreet, Onur Tukel, Michael Tully, Rachel Korine, Mark Darby Robinson, John Maringouin	sundance imdb
Silent House	U.S.A.	Chris Kentis, Laura Lau	Laura Lau	2011	86	Jan 21	Elizabeth Olsen, Adam Trese, Eric Sheffer Stevens, Julia Taylor Ross, Haley Murphy, Adam Barnett	sundance
The Catechism Cataclysm	U.S.A.	Todd Rohal	Todd Rohal	2010	81	Jan 22	Steve Little, Robert Longstreet, Walter Dalton, Miki Ann Maddox, Koko Lanham	sundance imdb
The Oregonian	U.S.A.	Calvin Lee Reeder	Calvin Lee Reeder	2010	81	Jan 24	Lindsay Pulsipher, Robert Longstreet, Matt Olsen, Lynne Compton, Barlow Jacobs, Roger M. Mayer	sundance imdb
Trollhunter	Norway	André Øvredal	André Øvredal	2010	103	Jan 21	Otto Jespersen, Glenn Erland Tosterud, Hans Morten Hansen, Johanna Mørch, Tomas Alf Larsen	sundance imdb
The Woman	U.S.A.	Lucky McKee	Jack Ketchum, Lucky McKee	2011	108	Jan 23	Pollyanna McIntosh, Sean Bridgers, Angela Bettis, Lauren Ashley Carter, Zach Rand	sundance imdb

=== From the Collection ===
Title	Country	Director	Writer	Year	Minutes	Debut	Cast	URL
Slacker	U.S.A.	Richard Linklater	Richard Linklater	1991	97	Jan 24	105 Austin residents	sundance imdb

=== New Frontier Films ===
Title	Country	Director	Writer	Year	Minutes	Debut	Cast	URL
!Women Art Revolution	U.S.A.	Lynn Hershman Leeson	Lynn Hershman Leeson	2010	83	Jan 22		sundance imdb
Jess + Moss	U.S.A.	Clay Jeter	Clay Jeter, Debra Jeter, Will Basanta, Isaac Hagy	2011	82	Jan 23	Sarah Hagan, Austin Vickers	sundance imdb
The Mill & The Cross	Poland, Sweden	Lech Majewski	Lech Majewski, Michael Francis Gibson	2011	91	Jan 23	Rutger Hauer, Michael York, Charlotte Rampling, Joanna Litwin, Dorota Lis	sundance imdb
The Nine Muses	United Kingdom	John Akomfrah	John Akomfrah	2010	92	Jan 21	Trevor Mathison, David Lawson, John Akomfrah	sundance imdb
The Woods	U.S.A.	Matthew Lessner	Matthew Lessner	2011	90	Jan 21	Justin Phillips, Toby David, Nicola Persky, Brian Woods, Lauren Hamersmith, Anne-Sophie	sundance imdb

=== Native Showcase ===
Title	Country	Director	Writer	Year	Minutes	Debut	Cast	URL
Grab	U.S.A.	Billy Luther	Billy Luther	2011	60	Jan 22		sundance imdb

=== Shorts ===
Title	Country	Director	Writer	Year	Minutes	Debut	Cast	URL
1989 (When I was 5 years old)	Denmark	Thor Ochsner	Thor Ochsner	2010	11	Jan 21	Narrated by Thor Ochsner	sundance
8BITS	France	Valere Amirault, Sarah Laufer, Jean Delaunay, Benjamin Mattern		2010	7	Jan 21		sundance
After You Left	U.S.A.	Jef Taylor	Jef Taylor, Michael Tisdale	2010	21	Jan 21	Michael Tisdale, Joanne Tucker, Dylan McCullough, Jolly Abraham, Garrett Neergaard	sundance
All Flowers In Time	Canada, U.S.A.	Jonathan Caouette	Jonathan Caouette	2010	14	Jan 21	Chloë Sevigny, Chandler Frantz, David Logan Rankin, Joshua Caouette, Eva Dorrepaal, Adolph Davis	sundance
Andy and Zach	U.S.A.	Nick Paley	Nick Paley	2010	10	Jan 21	Andy Kachor, Zach Woods, Elizabeth Galalis, Mallory Hawks, Jocelyn DeBoer	sundance
Animals Distract Me	U.S.A.	Isabella Rossellini	Isabella Rossellini	2010	47	Jan 22		sundance
Anne Truitt, Working	U.S.A.	Jem Cohen		2009	13	Jan 21		sundance
AWOL	U.S.A.	Deb Shoval	Deb Shoval	2010	14	Jan 21	Kayla Dempsey, Breeda Wool, Darrell Larson, Ruthie O'Dell, Jon Sordoni, Roy Brown	sundance
Baby	United Kingdom	Daniel Mulloy	Daniel Mulloy	2010	25	Jan 22	Arta Dobroshi, Daniel Kaluuya	sundance
Babyland	U.S.A.	Marc Fratello	Marc Fratello	2010	28	Jan 22	Marielena Logsdon, Tom Murphy, Deborah Jean Morgan, Jane Dashow, Neil Magnuson	sundance
Bike Race	U.S.A.	Tom Schroeder	Tom Schroeder, Hilde de Roover	2010	12	Jan 21		sundance
Blokes	Chile	Marially Rivas	Marially Rivas, Rodrigo Bellot	2010	15	Jan 22	Alfonso David, Pedro Campos, Paula Zuniga	sundance
Brick Novax—Part 1	U.S.A.	Matt Piedmont	Matt Piedmont	2010	8	Jan 22		sundance
Brick Novax—Part 2	U.S.A.	Matt Piedmont	Matt Piedmont	2010	8	Jan 22		sundance
The Cave (?E?ANX)	Canada	Helen Haig-Brown	Helen Haig-Brown	2009	11	Jan 23	Edmond Lulua, Elaina William, Loni Solomon	sundance
Choke	Canada	Michelle Latimer	Michelle Latimer	2011	6	Jan 23		sundance
Cinderela	Brazil, France	Magali Magistry	Magali Magistry	2011	11	Jan 22	Clara Choveaux	sundance
Close.	U.S.A.	Tahir Jetter	Tahir Jetter	2010	8	Jan 22	Carlton Byrd, Jade Jackson, Syhaya Smith, Kim Young, Don Conley	sundance
Crazy Beats Strong Every Time	U.S.A.	Moon Molson	Moon Molson	2011	26	Jan 21	Dante Clark, E.J. Bonilla, Hisham Tawfiq, Shawn Andrew, Anthony Gaskins, Adesola Osakalumi	sundance
Das Racist "Who's That? Brooown!"	U.S.A.	Thomas De Napoli	Thomas De Napoli	2010	5	Jan 21		sundance
Deeper Than Yesterday	Australia	Ariel Kleiman	Ariel Kleiman	2009	20	Jan 20	Albert Goikhman, Dmitiri Pronin	sundance
Diarchy	Italy	Ferdinando Cito Filomarino	Ferdinando Cito Filomarino	2010	20	Jan 21	Riccardo Scamarcio, Louis Garrel, Alba Rohrwacher	sundance
Ebony Society	New Zealand	Tammy Davis	Tammy Davis	2010	13	Jan 23	James Ru, Darcy Ray Flavell, Duane Wichman-Evans, Aaliyah Papata	sundance
EX-SEX	U.S.A.	Michael Mohan	Michael Mohan	2011	9	Jan 21	Kristen Riley, Jacob Womack	sundance
Excuse Me	U.S.A.	Duncan Birmingham	Duncan Birmingham	2010	6	Jan 22	Cy Carter, Angela Trimbur	sundance
Fight for Your Right Revisited	U.S.A.	Adam Yauch	Adam Yauch	2011	30	Jan 20	Elijah Wood, Danny McBride, Seth Rogen, Will Ferrell, John C. Reilly, Jack Black	sundance
Forever's Gonna Start Tonight	U.S.A.	Eliza Hittman	Eliza Hittman	2010	16	Jan 21	Viktoria Vinyarska, Nina Medvinskaya, Fedor Filonov, Andrew Drozdov, Mike Pikeman, Mariya Lebedovych	sundance
Grandpa's Wet Dream	Japan, U.S.A.	Chihiro Amemiya		2010	16	Jan 21	Shigeo Tokuda, Henry Tsukamoto	sundance
I'm Having a Difficult Time Killing My Parents	U.S.A.	Jeff Tomsic	T. J. Miller, Jeff Tomsic	2010	14	Jan 22	T. J. Miller, Brian Sacca, Ethan Suplee, Allison Munn, Kent Miller, Leslie Miller	sundance
Incident by a Bank	Sweden	Ruben Östlund	Ruben Östlund	2010	12	Jan 21	Lars Melin, Henrik Vikman, Bahador Foladi, Ramtin Parvaneh, Leif Edlund, Rasmus Lindgren, Per-Olof Albrektsson	sundance
Jupiter Elicius	U.S.A.	Kelly Sears	Kelly Sears	2010	6	Jan 21	Corey Fogel, Anthony McCann	sundance
Little Brother	United Kingdom	Callum Cooper	Callum Cooper in collaboration with the Oni family	2010	7	Jan 21	Tolani Oni, Ola Anderson, Olabisi T-Oni, Darren Anthony Moore	sundance
Living for 32	U.S.A.	Kevin Breslin		2010	40	Jan 22		sundance
Love & Theft	Germany	Andreas Hykade		2010	7	Jan 22		sundance
Love Birds	Czech Republic	Brian Lye	Brian Lye	2010	7	Jan 21	Maja Kovac, Beda Levi, Jiri Suchy, Karel Zima	sundance
Marcel the Shell with Shoes On	U.S.A.	Dean Fleischer-Camp	Jenny Slate, Dean Fleischer-Camp	2010	4	Jan 21	Jenny Slate	sundance
Negativipeg	Canada	Matthew Rankin	Matthew Rankin	2010	15	Jan 21		sundance
Null (aka Lancelot, Again)	U.S.A.	Amanda Micheli		2010	6	Jan 22	Nina and Edgar Otto, Lancelot, Lancelot Encore	sundance
On the Way to the Sea	Canada, China	Tao Gu	Tao Gu	2010	20	Jan 23	ChuanShu Gu, YuGen LI	sundance
oops	U.S.A.	Chris Beckman	Billy Rennekamp and Chris Beckman	2009	10	Jan 21		sundance
Out of Reach	Poland	Jakub Stozek	Jakub Stozek	2010	30	Jan 21		sundance
Pandemic 41.410806, -75.654259	U.S.A.	Lance Weiler	Lance Weiler, Chuck Wendig	2010	10	Jan 24	Alexia Rasmussen, Trevor Harker	sundance
Pioneer	U.S.A.	David Lowery	David Lowery	2010	15	Jan 21	Will Oldham, Myles Brooks	sundance
Protoparticles	Spain	Chema García Ibarra	Chema García Ibarra	2010	8	Jan 25	José Antonio Fernández, Jose Manuel Ibarra, Susi Martínez, Pedro de la Ossa	sundance
Redemption	New Zealand	Katie Wolfe	Tim Balme, Renae Maihi, Katie Wolfe, based on the short story by Phil Kanawa	2010	17	Jan 23	Pana Hema-Taylor, Sera Henare, Karlos Drinkwater	sundance
Sasquatch Birth Journal 2	U.S.A.	Zellner Bros.	Zellner Bros.	2010	4	Jan 22	Gigantopithecus canadensis	sundance
Satan Since 2003	U.S.A.	Carlos Puga	Carlos Puga	2010	19	Jan 21		sundance
sexting	U.S.A.	Neil LaBute	Neil LaBute	2010	8	Jan 22	Julia Stiles, Marin Ireland, Jamie Anderson	sundance
Shikasha	Japan	Isamu Hirabayashi	Isamu Hirabayashi	2010	11	Jan 21	Machiko Ono, Keisuke Horibe, Naoto Nojima, Koji Yamaguchi	sundance
Skateistan: To Live and Skate Kabul	United Kingdom	Orlando von Einsiedel		2010	9	Jan 21		sundance
Small Change	Ireland	Cathy Brady	Cathy Brady	2010	17	Jan 21	Nora-Jane Noone, Olivia Nash, Tom Collins, Tina Maxwell, Rozlyn Sheridan	sundance
Something Left, Something Taken	U.S.A.	Ru Kuwahata, Max Porter		2010	10	Jan 21		sundance
Spring	United Kingdom	Hong Khaou	Hong Khaou	2010	13	Jan 22	Chris O'Donnell, Jonathan Keane	sundance
Stardust	Belgium	Nicolas Provost	Nicolas Provost	2010	20	Jan 22	Nicolas Provost	sundance
Stones	U.S.A.	Ty Sanga	Ty Sanga	2009	20	Jan 23	Moses Goods, Rava Shastid	sundance
Stopover	Romania	Ioana Uricaru	Cristian Mungiu	2010	14	Jan 21	Monica Bîrlădeanu, Damian Drăghici	sundance
Storm	Brazil	Cesar Cabral	Cesar Cabral, Leandro Maciel	2010	10	Jan 21		sundance
The Barber of Birmingham: Foot Soldier of the Civil Rights Movement	U.S.A.	Gail Dolgin, Robin Fryday		2010	19	Jan 22	Mr. James Armstrong, Amelia Boynton, Rev C. T. Vivian, Rev. Gaston	sundance
The Eagleman Stag	United Kingdom	Mikey Please	Mikey Please	2010	9	Jan 21	David Cann, Tony Guilfoyle	sundance
The External World	Germany, Ireland	David OReilly	David OReilly	2010	15	Jan 20		sundance
The Greatness	China	Yi Zhou	Yi Zhou	2010	7	Jan 21	Pharrell Williams	sundance
The High Level Bridge	Canada	Trevor Anderson	Trevor Anderson	2010	5	Jan 24	Trevor Anderson	sundance
The Hunter and the Swan Discuss Their Meeting	U.S.A.	Emily Carmichael	Emily Carmichael	2011	8	Jan 21		sundance
The Legend of Beaver Dam	Canada	Jerome Sable	Jerome Sable, Eli Battalion	2010	12	Jan 21	L.J. Benet, Seán Cullen, Rick Miller, Kailey Swanson, Michael Chey	sundance
The Majestic Plastic Bag	U.S.A.	Jeremy Konner	Sarah May Bates, Regie Miller	2010	4	Jan 22	Jeremy Irons	sundance
The Pact	U.S.A.	Nicholas McCarthy	Nicholas McCarthy	2010	11	Jan 24	Jewel Staite, Sam Ball	sundance
The Rocket Boy	U.S.A.	Donavan Seschillie	Donavan Seschillie	2010	16	Jan 23	Michael Sangster, Tim Cronley Jr., Danielle Henry	sundance
The Strange Ones	U.S.A.	Christopher Radcliff, Lauren Wolkstein	Christopher Radcliff, Lauren Wolkstein	2011	15	Jan 20	David Call, Tobias Campbell, Merritt Wever	sundance
The Terrys	U.S.A.	Tim Heidecker, Eric Wareheim	Tim Heidecker, Eric Wareheim	2010	15	Jan 20	Tim Heidecker, Eric Wareheim with the voices of Peter Serafinowicz and Adam Scott	sundance
The Wind Is Blowing on My Street	Iran	Saba Riazi	Saba Riazi	2010	15	Jan 22	Rahman Houshyar	sundance
This Is Not a Suit	United Kingdom	Jon Clements, Chris Gaunt, Adrien Sauvage	Adrien Sauvage, Madeleine Morlet	2010	8	Jan 21	Adrien Sauvage, Larry Lamb	sundance
Tord and Tord	Sweden	Niki Lindroth von Bahr	N. L. von Bahr, based on the novel by Jorun Jonasson	2010	11	Jan 21	Narrated by Thomas Tidholm	sundance
Tornado	Mexico	Francis Alys de Smedt, Julien Devaux	Francis Alys de Smedt	2010	40	Jan 21		sundance
Triumph of the Wild	U.S.A.	Martha Colburn	Martha Colburn	2010	11	Jan 21		sundance
Tussilago	Sweden	Jonas Odell	Jonas Odell	2010	14	Jan 21	Malin Buska, Camaron Silverek	sundance
Venus	U.S.A.	Jessica Oreck	Jessica Oreck	2010	5	Jan 22	Jackie Raynal	sundance
Wapawekka	Canada	Danis Goulet	Danis Goulet	2010	16	Jan 23	Josh Goulet, Keith Goulet	sundance
We're Leaving	U.S.A.	Zachary Treitz	Zachary Treitz	2010	13	Jan 22	Rusty Blanton, Veronica Blanton, David Maloney	sundance
Worst Enemy	U.S.A.	Lake Bell	Lake Bell	2010	13	Jan 20	Michaela Watkins, Matt Walsh	sundance
Xemoland	U.S.A.	Daniel Cardenas	Daniel Cardenas	2009	13	Jan 21	Alex Fumero, Daniel Cardenas, Adrian Mesa	sundance
Yearbook	U.S.A.	Carter Smith		2010	10	Jan 22		sundance
Yelp (With Apologies to Allen Ginsberg's "Howl")	U.S.A.	Tiffany Shlain	Tiffany Shlain, Ken Goldeberg	2010	3	Jan 21	Narrated by Peter Coyote	sundance
