= Megan Griffiths =

American film director

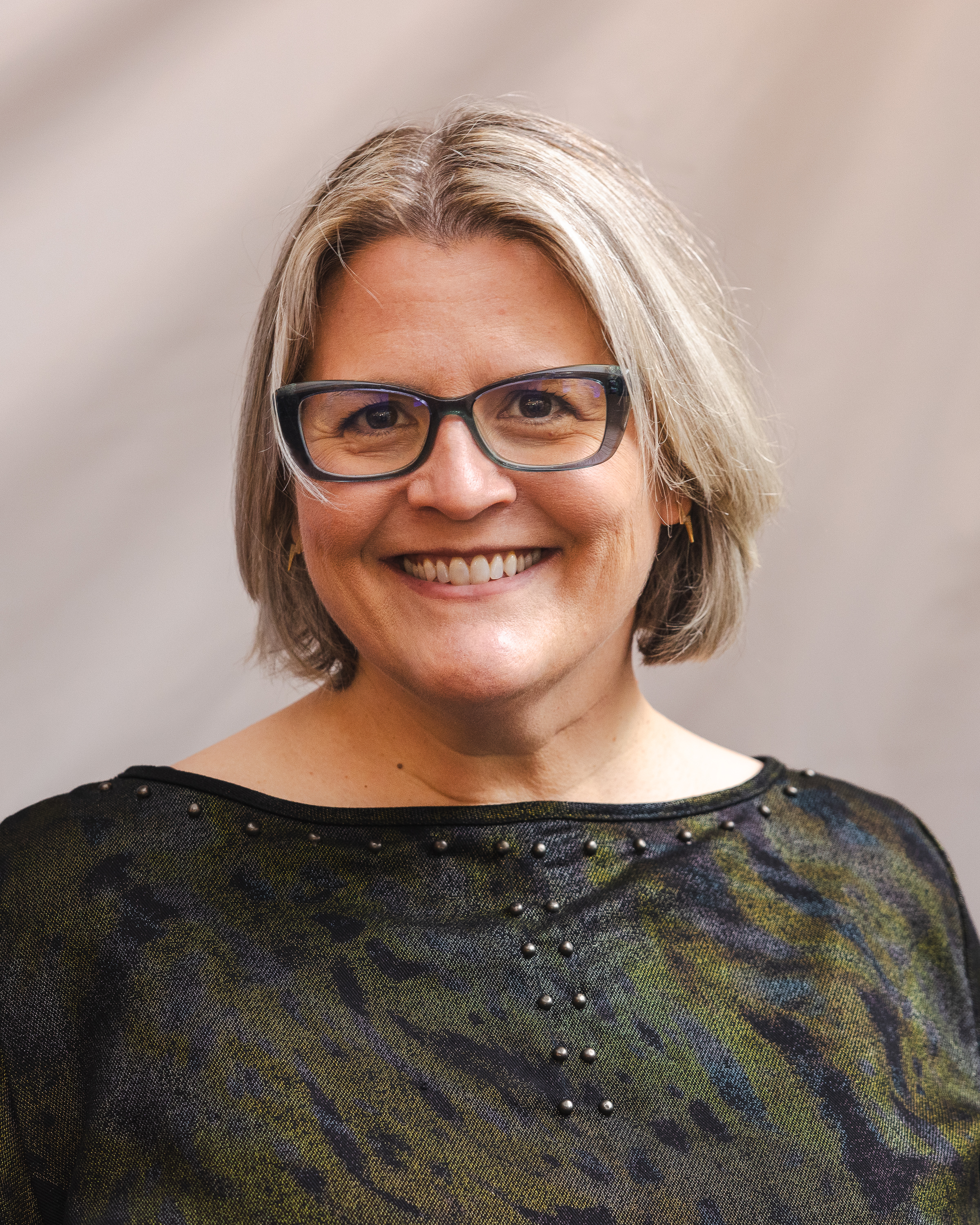
- Megan Griffiths at the 2025 Seattle International Film Festival
- Born: April 22, 1975 (age 51); Athens, Ohio, U.S.
- Education: University of Idaho, Ohio University
- Occupations: TV & Film director

Megan Griffiths (born April 22, 1975) is an American film and television director who resides in Seattle, and is a board member of Northwest Film Forum.

== Early life and education ==
Megan Griffiths was born in Ohio, lived in Moscow, Idaho in her teens, attended Moscow High School, and was an undergraduate at the University of Idaho where she earned a B.A. in visual communications in 1997.

She received an MFA in Film Production from Ohio University School of Film in 2000.

== Career ==
=== Film ===
Griffiths wrote and directed her first feature film, First Aid For Choking, which was released in 2003. Griffiths subsequently worked as a producer and first assistant director on features in and around Seattle including Zoo, The Immaculate Conception of Little Dizzle, The Catechism Cataclysm, and Your Sister's Sister.

Her second feature The Off Hours world premiered at the 2011 Sundance Film Festival and went on to receive a nomination at the 2011 Independent Spirit Awards for Ben Kasulke's cinematography.

Griffiths released Eden in 2012. The film starred Jamie Chung, Matt O'Leary and Beau Bridges, and it told a story about a human trafficking survivor. The Stranger newspaper wrote, "Griffiths navigates the horrifying facts of her film with great respect," and her direction was described as "a veritable master class in how to make humane art out of inhumanity."

The following year she released a comedy titled Lucky Them. The film, shot in Seattle, starred Toni Collette, along with Thomas Haden Church, Oliver Platt, and a cameo by Johnny Depp. It premiered in the Special Presentation section at the 2013 Toronto International Film Festival.

Griffiths wrote and directed The Night Stalker, in which Lou Diamond Phillips played American serial killer Richard Ramirez. The film co-starred Bellamy Young and was acquired by Lifetime Television. It aired on June 12, 2016.

Her sixth feature Sadie starred Sophia Mitri Schoss, Melanie Lynskey, John Gallagher, Jr., Tony Hale, Danielle Brooks, Tee Dennard, and Keith L. Williams. It premiered at the 2018 SXSW Film Festival. Variety said, "writer-director Megan Griffiths’ quietly absorbing and methodically disquieting drama is a genuine rarity."

I'll Show You Mine directed by Griffiths and starring Poorna Jagannathan and Casey Thomas Brown had its debut at Seattle International Film Festival on April 16, 2022. I'll Show You Mine was acquired by Gravitas Ventures and released in theaters and on demand on June 23, 2023.

Her eighth film, Year Of The Fox, written by Eliza Flug, also premiered at Seattle International Film Festival on May 13, 2023. The cast includes Sarah Jeffery, Jane Adams, Lexi Simonsen, Jake Weber, and Balthazar Getty. Year Of The Fox won Best Directing and Best Feature at the 2023 Catalina Film Festival. It was acquired by Electric Entertainment in February, 2024.

The short film View From The Floor, directed by Griffiths and Mindie Lind and animated by Joe Garber, premiered at the 2025 Sundance Film Festival in the Documentary Shorts Program on January 25th, 2025.

=== Television ===
In 2017, Griffiths directed two episodes of Room 104 broadcast on HBO. "Missionaries" premiered September 8, 2017, and "The Fight" premiered on October 6, 2017. Both episodes were written by Mark Duplass. "Missionaries" was nominated for a 2018 GLAAD Media Award in the "Outstanding Individual Episode" category for its portrayal of two Latter Day Saints companions who begin to question their stereotypes on sexuality. Later that year, Griffiths directed one episode of Epix series Graves starring Nick Nolte and Sela Ward titled "They Die Happier" which premiered on December 3, 2017.

Griffiths directed one episode of TNT series Animal Kingdom titled "Prey" and starring Ellen Barkin. "Prey" premiered on June 26, 2018.

Four shows directed by Griffiths aired in 2019. First was "Like A F-ing God Or Something", Episode 6 of The Society on Netflix. It premiered on May 10, 2019. Her second television job that year was a return to Animal Kingdom. Griffiths directed "Tank" which aired on June 18, 2019. Her third show that year was Episode 6 of Hulu's Looking For Alaska, "We Are All Going", which aired on October 18, 2019, and starred Kristine Froseth. Finally she directed one episode of the Fox Broadcasting Company series Prodigal Son titled "All Souls And Sadists" and broadcast on October 28, 2019.

Griffiths directed one episode of USA Network series Dare Me starring Herizen Guardiola and Willa Fitzgerald titled "Fog Of War" which aired on March 1, 2020. She also directed two episodes of the Netflix series Trinkets starring Brianna Hildebrand titled "Same Time Last Year" and "Black Friday" which both aired on Aug 25, 2020.

She directed two episodes of Amazon Studios show Panic. Episode 7 titled "Trust" and episode 8 titled "Returns" both premiered on May 28, 2021.

Griffiths next directed episode eight in season one of HBO Max series Pretty Little Liars: Original Sin. The episode, written by Michael Grassi & Stasia Demick, was titled "Chapter Eight: Bad Blood" and it aired August 18, 2022.

In 2023, Griffiths served as the producing director of Prime Video series The Summer I Turned Pretty (TV series), season 2, starring Lola Tung, Christopher Briney, and Gavin Casalegno. She directed episode 7: "Love Affair" aired Aug 11, 2023, and episode 8: "Love Triangle" aired Aug 18, 2023.

== Awards ==
- 2011 Emergent Narrative Female Director audience award, South by Southwest
- 2012 The Stranger Genius Award for Film
- 2013 City Arts magazine Film Artist of the year.
- 2015 Seattle Mayor's Award for Outstanding Achievement in Film
- 2018 Gryphon Award, Giffoni Film Festival

== Filmography ==
=== Television ===
Year	Title	Episode(s)
2017	Room 104	"Missionaries" "The Fight"
2017	Graves	"They Die Happier"
2018-2019	Animal Kingdom	"Prey" "Tank"
2019	The Society	"Like a F-ing God or Something"
2019	Looking For Alaska	"We Are All Going"
2019	Prodigal Son	"All Souls And Sadists"
2020	Dare Me	"Fog of War"
2020	Trinkets	"Same Time Last Year" "Black Friday"
2021	Panic	"Trust" "Returns"
2022	Pretty Little Liars: Original Sin	"Bad Blood"
2023	The Summer I Turned Pretty	"Love Affair" "Love Triangle"

First Assistant Director

- $5 Cover: Seattle (2010)

=== Film ===
Year	Title	Director	Writer	Notes
2003	First Aid for Choking	Yes	Yes	Also producer
2011	The Off Hours	Yes	Yes	Also editor and casting
2013	Eden	Yes	Yes	
2014	Lucky Them	Yes	No	
2016	The Night Stalker	Yes	No	
2018	Sadie	Yes	Yes	
2022	I'll Show You Mine	Yes	No	
2023	Year Of The Fox	Yes	No	

Short film

Year	Title	Director	Writer
2008	Moving	Yes	Yes
2009	Eros	Yes	Yes
2025	View From The Floor	Yes	Yes

Other credits

- Shag Carpet Sunset (2002) – Director of Photography
- Urban Scarecrow (2006) – Cinematographer
- We Go Way Back (2006) – First Assistant Director
- The Guatemalan Handshake (2006) – Producer/First Assistant Director
- June and July (2006) – First Assistant Director
- Zoo (2007) – Assistant Director
- Cthulhu (2007) – First Assistant Director
- Butterfly Dreaming (2008) – First Assistant Director
- The Immaculate Conception of Little Dizzle (2009) – First Assistant Director
- The Day My Parents Became Cool (short) (2009) – First Assistant Director
- The Whole Truth (2009) – First Assistant Director
- Crimes of the Past (2009) – First Assistant Director
- Wrong Turn at Tahoe (2009) – First Assistant Director
- Late Autumn (2010) – First Assistant Director
- The Catechism Cataclysm (2011) – Producer/Assistant Director/Casting Director
- Rat Pack Rat (2014) - Producer
