= Robert Longstreet =

American actor

- Longstreet at the 2025 Toronto International Film Festival
- Born: November 8, 1962 (age 64); U.S.
- Occupations: Actor film producer film editor
- Years active: 1993–present

Robert Longstreet (born November 8, 1962) is an American actor, producer and editor. He is best known for his roles in the television series The Haunting of Hill House, Midnight Mass, The Midnight Club, The Fall of the House of Usher, The Creep Tapes, Room 104, and I'm a Virgo, and in the films Sorry to Bother You, Undertow, Pineapple Express, Halloween Kills, Fuck My Son!, Doctor Sleep, and the upcoming The Exorcist: Martyrs. He has frequently collaborated with directors Mike Flanagan, David Gordon Green, Boots Riley, Todd Rohal, and Mark Duplass on projects.

== Filmography ==
=== Feature films ===
| Year | Title | Role | Director | Notes |
|---|---|---|---|---|
| 1994 | Getting In | Man in Library | Doug Liman | |
| 1998 | The Week That Girl Died | Jimmy | | Also executive producer and editor |
| 2001 | Ding-a-ling-Less | Alan | | Also producer and editor |
| 2002 | Divine Secrets of the Ya-Ya Sisterhood | | Callie Khouri | |
| 2003 | Ball of Wax | Cop Voice | | |
| 2004 | Undertow | Bern | David Gordon Green | |
| 2005 | The Pigs | Paul Griffin | | Also co-producer |
| 2006 | Four the Roses | Customer | | |
| 2007 | Great World of Sound | Layton | Craig Zobel | |
| 2007 | Low and Behold | E.D. 'Stully' Stull | | |
| 2008 | Pineapple Express | Dr. Terrence | David Gordon Green | |
| 2011 | Take Shelter | Jim | Jeff Nichols | |
| 2011 | The Catechism Cataclysm | Robbie Shoemaker | Todd Rohal | Also executive producer |
| 2011 | Septien | Ezra Rawlings | Michael Tully | Also executive producer |
| 2011 | The Oregonian | Herb | Calvin Lee Reeder | |
| 2012 | Nature Calls | Drew Pritchard | Todd Rohal | |
| 2012 | 5 Time Champion | Harold | | |
| 2012 | Bob Birdnow's Remarkable Tale of Human Survival and the Transcendence of Self | Jerry | | |
| 2012 | Meanwhile | —N/a | | Co-producer only |
| 2013 | Ain't Them Bodies Saints | Cowboy Hat | David Lowery | |
| 2013 | This Is Martin Bonner | Steve Helms | Chad Hartigan | |
| 2013 | Congratulations! | Mr. Eddie Gray | | |
| 2013 | Detonator | Dutch | Lawrence Levine | |
| 2013 | The Heroes of Arvine Place | Howard Edgars | | |
| 2014 | Ping Pong Summer | Uncle Jim | Michael Tully | |
| 2014 | The Signal | James | William Eubank | |
| 2014 | Thou Wast Mild and Lovely | Jeremiah | Josephine Decker | |
| 2014 | Sabbatical | Ben Hardin | | |
| 2014 | She's Lost Control | C.T. | Anja Marquardt | |
| 2014 | White Creek | Teddy Bear | | |
| 2014 | The Missing Girl | Mort Colvins | | |
| 2015 | Lamb | Fishing Show Narrator (voice) | Ross Partridge | |
| 2015 | Uncle Kent 2 | Front Desk Robbie | | |
| 2015 | The Operative | Douglas | | |
| 2016 | Slash | Blake | Clay Liford | |
| 2016 | Always Shine | Producer No. 1 | Sophia Takal | Uncredited |
| 2016 | Rainbow Time | Jake's Dad | Linas Phillips | |
| 2016 | Show Yourself | Jerry | | |
| 2017 | I Don't Feel at Home in This World Anymore | Chris Rumack | Macon Blair | |
| 2017 | Dismissed | Paul Garrett | Benjamin Arfmann | |
| 2017 | Dr. Brinks & Dr. Brinks | Bill Tully | | |
| 2017 | Mohawk | Sherwood Beal | | |
| 2017 | The Legend of Master Legend | Ray | | TV movie |
| 2018 | Sorry to Bother You | Anderson | Boots Riley | |
| 2018 | Aquaman | Professor James | James Wan | |
| 2018 | The Old Man & the Gun | Stephen Beckley Jr., Esq. | David Lowery | |
| 2018 | Back Roads | Uncle Mike | Alex Pettyfer | |
| 2018 | Jules of Light and Dark | Freddy | Brian C. Padian | |
| 2018 | Ghostbox Cowboy | Bob | | |
| 2018 | Poor Jane | Robert | | |
| 2019 | Doctor Sleep | Barry the Chunk | Mike Flanagan | |
| 2019 | Sword of Trust | Truther | Lynn Shelton | |
| 2019 | Ravage | Ravener | Teddy Grennan | |
| 2020 | A Dim Valley | Clarence | | |
| 2020 | The Immortal Jellyfish | Captain Stone | | |
| 2021 | Judas and the Black Messiah | Leslie Carlyle | Shaka King | |
| 2021 | Halloween Kills | Lonnie Elam | David Gordon Green | |
| 2021 | The Civil Dead | Arnold | Clay Tatum | |
| 2024 | This Too Shall Pass | Rockford | | |
| 2024 | The Twin | Dr. Beaumont | | |
| 2025 | The Threesome | Paul Brooks | | |
| 2025 | Fuck My Son! | Vermina | Todd Rohal | |
| 2027 | The Exorcist: Martyrs | | Mike Flanagan | Post-production |
| TBA | Tender | Daniel Hirsch | | Post-production |
| TBA | A Dying Art | Hap Gunderson | | Post-production |

=== Short films ===
| Year | Title | Role | Director | Notes |
|---|---|---|---|---|
| 2008 | Gauge | Man | Alistair Banks Griffin | |
| 2008 | Becoming Monkey | Monkey | | |
| 2009 | Ice Cream | Bear | | |
| 2011 | Color of the Ground | Collector | | |
| 2011 | Kachina | Bill | | |
| 2012 | A Pale Shadow | Ed | Sean Rourke Meehan | Also executive producer |
| 2012 | What Happens When Robert Leaves the Room | Robert | | |
| 2012 | Atonal | Jesse | | |
| 2013 | Slash | Robert | | |
| 2013 | Cork's Cattlebaron | Brady | | |
| 2013 | Seriously Delinquent | | | Voice |
| 2014 | Rat Pack Rat | —N/a | Todd Rohal | Executive producer only |
| 2014 | Surveillance | | | |
| 2014 | Subsurface Flow | Warren | | |
| 2016 | Vincent | Adrian Granado | | |
| 2017 | Seahorse | Dr. Vincent Morguelan | | |
| 2017 | LaZercism | | | |
| 2018 | Two If By Sea | Albert | | |
| 2018 | Good Luck in the Land of Mañana | | | Voiceover |
| 2018 | End Times | | | |
| 2019 | Five Thousand Friends | George | | |
| 2020 | Subject 19 | Lew | | |
| 2021 | Six Blocks Famous | Jimmy | Andrew Hopper | |

=== Television ===
| Year | Title | Role | Notes |
|---|---|---|---|
| 1993–1994 | Matlock | Assistant Director / Eddie Price | 2 episodes |
| 1997 | Night Stand with Dick Dietrick | Jimmy Plusco | 1 episode |
| 2001–2003 | Dawson's Creek | Best Buy Employee / Atty. Brezny | 2 episodes |
| 2018 | The Haunting of Hill House | Mr. Dudley | 6 episodes |
| 2019 | Room 104 | Allan | 1 episode |
| 2019 | Carrier | Hutch / Receiving Clerk | Podcast series; 4 episodes |
| 2021 | Midnight Mass | Joe Collie | 4 episodes |
| 2022 | The Midnight Club | Janitor | 2 episodes |
| 2022 | Pieces of Her | Car Salesman | 1 episode |
| 2022 | I'm a Virgo | Cult Leader | 3 episodes |
| 2023 | The Fall of the House of Usher | William Longfellow | 1 episode |
| 2025 | The Creep Tapes | Mark | 1 episode |
