= Eddie Rouse =

American actor

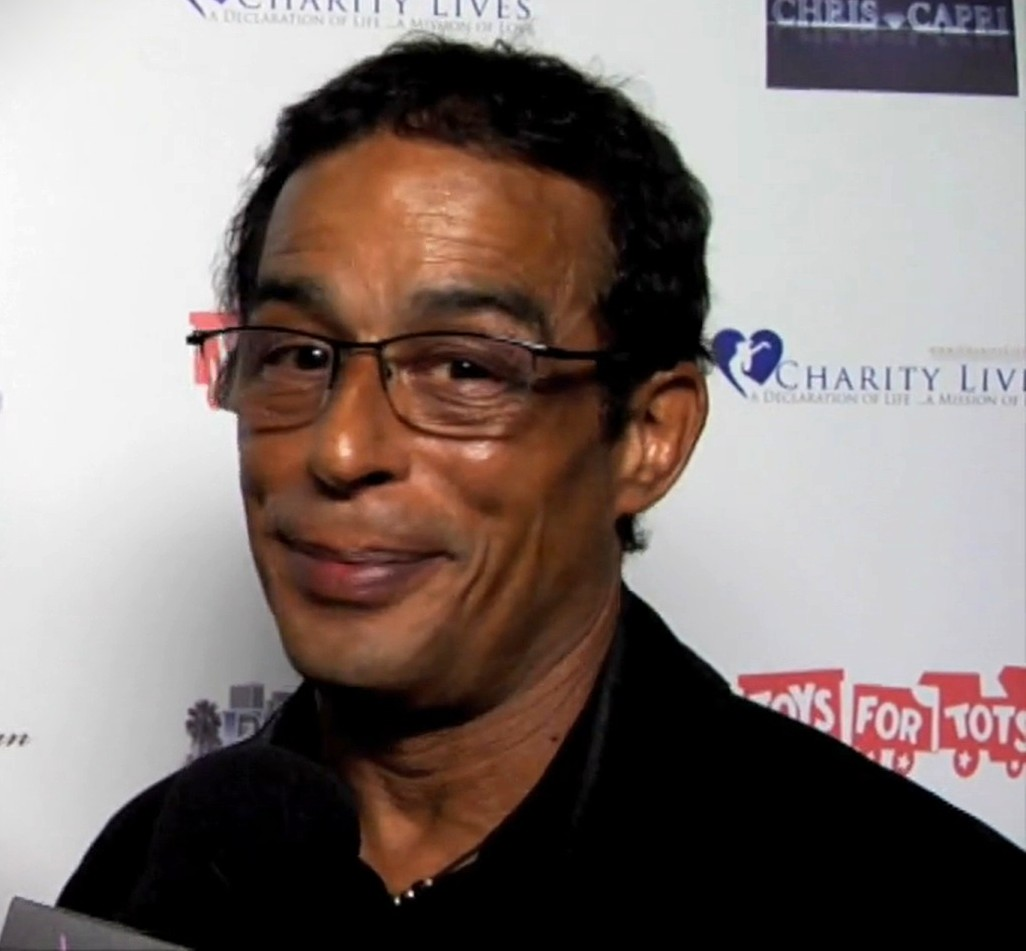
- Rouse in 2009
- Born: July 2, 1954; Philadelphia, Pennsylvania, U.S.
- Died: December 7, 2014 (aged 60); Santa Monica, California, U.S.
- Occupation: Actor
- Children: 5

Eddie Rouse (July 2, 1954 – December 7, 2014) was an American character actor whose feature film credits included American Gangster, The Number 23, and Pineapple Express. Rouse starred in the 2014 dramatic short film Rat Pack Rat as a Sammy Davis impersonator hired to perform at a birthday party. He was filming the HBO television series Westworld at the time of his death in 2014.

== Early life ==
Rouse, who was of African American heritage, attended Olney High School in the Olney section of Philadelphia, Pennsylvania. He began his career in acting at the Bushfire Theatre of the Performing Arts, also located in Philadelphia. Rouse then studied at the North Carolina School of the Arts, where he first met fellow students, Danny McBride and filmmaker David Gordon Green, whom he would work with later in his career.

== Career ==
Rouse made his feature film debut in David Gordon Green's George Washington, released in 2000, as a character's "cranky uncle." (George Washington was also Green's debut as a film producer, film director and screenwriter). Rouse was then cast in several more of David Gordon Green's films, including All the Real Girls in 2003, Pineapple Express in 2008, and The Sitter, opposite Jonah Hill, in 2011.

Rouse also appeared in the 2002 basketball-themed romantic comedy Juwanna Mann; Ridley Scott's American Gangster and Joel Schumacher's The Number 23, both released in 2007; Pandorum as a chef who has gone crazy in 2009; and the 2010 Joaquin Phoenix mockumentary I'm Still Here directed by Casey Affleck. Rouse completed filming for the Seth Rogen film The Green Hornet, in 2011, but his scenes were cut from the movie. He had experienced an uptick in roles during his later career, including parts in Being Flynn in 2012, Nature Calls in 2012, and Low Down in 2014.

Eddie Rouse starred in Todd Rohal's 2014 short film Rat Pack Rat as a Sammy Davis impersonator hired to perform at a child's birthday party. The film won the Short Film Special Jury Award for Unique Vision at the 2014 Sundance Film Festival. Clay Liford, the producer of Rat Pack Rat, wrote on Twitter, "He [Rouse] really made our little short shine this year."

In 2014, Rouse was cast as Kissy (short for Kisecawchuck), a Native American saloon contraband dealer in the HBO series Westworld. The series, which is based on the 1973 film Westworld by Michael Crichton, was executive produced by J. J. Abrams. It was set in a "futuristic amusement park." Rouse filmed the pilot episode in Utah just a few weeks before his death.

Rouse made his final television appearance in the Adult Swim original TV series Black Dynamite.

== Personal life and death ==
Eddie Rouse died from liver failure at UCLA Medical Center in Santa Monica, California, on December 7, 2014, at the age of 60 with his son Eddie Rouse III at his side. He was survived by 5 children: Nikia, Aisha, Tinisha, Brandon, and eldest son Eddie Rouse III, a.k.a. Eddie Kane. He had 13 grandchildren and 8 great-grandchildren.
