= Gotham Independent Film Awards 2007 =

Annual US film awards ceremony

17th Annual Gotham Independent Film Awards
- Date: November 27, 2007
- Country: United States
- Presented by: Independent Filmmaker Project
- Hosted by: Sarah Jones

Highlights
- Most nominations: Great World of Sound (3)
- Best Feature: Into the Wild
- Breakthrough Director: Craig Zobel – Great World of Sound
- Website: https://gotham.ifp.org

The 17th Annual Gotham Independent Film Awards, presented by the Independent Filmmaker Project, were held on November 27, 2007, and were hosted by Sarah Jones. The nominees were announced on October 22, 2007.

== Winners and nominees ==
Best Feature: Into the Wild; Great World of Sound; I'm Not There; Margot at the Wedding; The Namesake	Best Documentary Feature: Sicko; The Devil Came on Horseback; Man from Plains; My Kid Could Paint That; Taxi to the Dark Side
Breakthrough Director: Craig Zobel – Great World of Sound; Lee Isaac Chung – Munyurangabo; Stephane Gauger – Owl and the Sparrow; Julia Loktev – Day Night Day Night; David Von Ancken – Seraphim Falls	Breakthrough Actor: Elliot Page (Note: Credited as Ellen Page) – Juno as Juno MacGuff; Emile Hirsch – Into the Wild as Chris McCandless; Kene Holliday – Great World of Sound as Clarence; Jess Weixler – Teeth as Dawn O'Keefe; Luisa Williams – Day Night Day Night as She
Best Ensemble Performance: Before the Devil Knows You're Dead – Albert Finney, Rosemary Harris, Ethan Hawke, Philip Seymour Hoffman, Brían F. O'Byrne, Amy Ryan, Michael Shannon, and Marisa Tomei (TIE); Talk to Me – Cedric the Entertainer, Don Cheadle, Chiwetel Ejiofor, Mike Epps, Vondie Curtis Hall, Taraji P. Henson, and Martin Sheen (TIE); The Last Winter – Connie Britton, Kevin Corrigan, Zach Gilford, James LeGros, and Ron Perlman; Margot at the Wedding – Jack Black, Flora Cross, Ciarán Hinds, Nicole Kidman, Jennifer Jason Leigh, Zane Pais, and John Turturro; The Savages – Philip Bosco, Philip Seymour Hoffman, and Laura Linney	Best Film Not Playing at a Theater Near You: Frownland; August the First; Loren Cass; Mississippi Chicken; Off the Grid: Life on the Mesa

=== Gotham Tributes ===
- Javier Bardem
- Michael Bloomberg
- Roger Ebert
- Mark Friedberg
- Mira Nair
- Jonathan Sehring
