= The Off Hours =

- Directed by: Megan Griffiths
- Written by: Megan Griffiths
- Produced by: Mischa Jakupcak; Lacey Leavitt; Joy Saez
- Starring: Amy Seimetz; Ross Partridge; Scoot McNairy
- Cinematography: Benjamin Kasulke
- Music by: Joshua Morrison; Jeramy Koepping
- Release date: January 22, 2011
- Running time: 93 minutes
- Country: United States
- Language: English

The Off Hours is an American film written and directed by Seattle filmmaker Megan Griffiths. The full-length feature film is akin to real life events that happened at a truck stop. It was distinguished due to its adoption of environmental and socially acceptable settings, which has won recognition by the Sustainable Style Foundation with a SSF Tag award. The film was premiered at the Sundance Film Festival in Park City, Utah on January 22, 2011.

== Plot ==
The official website describes the film: "In The Off Hours, Amy Seimetz alluringly commands the screen as Francine, a waitress whose liberation from her mundane existence is long overdue. In the restless world of the night shift at a highway diner, Francine's life consists of casual encounters and transient friendships. What she wants is out of reach—or is it that she's lost track of wanting anything at all? When a banker turned big-rig driver becomes a regular, he sparks hope in Francine. As change begins to invade the quiet diner, Francine is reminded that it is never too late to become the person she was meant to be."

== Production ==
Griffiths, the film's writer and director, was inspired to begin writing this story after spending several months working the night shift at a film lab in 2003. Griffiths has worked on set in many capacities, from producer to cinematographer to assistant director. She noticed that those employees who worked the night shift seemed to have similar personality traits. The script thus evolved from her interest in the night shift culture. Fund raising for the film began in 2007.

The film was shot in Seattle in Burien, South Park and Georgetown with many local enthusiasts supporting Griffiths.

The Off Hours was the first film to receive the "SSF Tag" from the Sustainable Style Foundation, an organization that promotes environmentally friendly practices. The film was able to meet the demands for the SSF Tag by using second-hand furniture for set design and second-hand clothes for costume design. The film was also shot digitally, which avoids the toxic materials found in traditional film.

== Release ==
The film premiered at the 27th Sundance Film Festival on January 22, 2011, in NEXT, a non-competition category focusing on low-budget, independent filmmaking.
