= Rat Pack Rat =

- Film poster
- Directed by: Todd Rohal
- Written by: Todd Rohal
- Produced by: Zack Carlson; Megan Griffiths; Clay Liford; Ashland Viscosi
- Starring: Steve Little; Eddie Rouse; Margie Beegle
- Cinematography: Benjamin Kasulke
- Edited by: Todd Rohal
- Music by: Joseph Stephens
- Production companies: Arts+Labor; Smits Brothers
- Release date: January 17, 2014 (Sundance)
- Running time: 19 minutes
- Country: United States
- Language: English

Rat Pack Rat is a 2014 drama short film, written and directed by Todd Rohal. The film had its premiere at 2014 Sundance Film Festival on January 17, 2014. It won the Jury Award at the festival.

The film later screened at 2014 SXSW Film Festival on March 8, 2014. It also marks the final motion picture performance of Eddie Rouse, who died on December 7, 2014, of liver failure.

== Plot ==
A Sammy Davis Jr. impersonator, was hired by a Rat Pack fan's mother to perform on his birthday.

== Cast ==
- Steve Little as Rat Pack fan
- Eddie Rouse as Sammy Davis Jr. impersonator
- Margie Beegle as mother

== Reception ==
Rat Pack Rat received mostly positive reviews from critics. Kat Smith of The Hollywood News gave the film four out of five stars and praised the film by saying that "This short will keep you engaged and guessing where the story is going right up until the last minute." Liz Whittemore of Cinemit, gave the film a positive review that "Rat Pack Rat will leave you with mouth gaping open at the end, it is worth every cringe-worthy second."

== Accolades ==
Year	Award	Category	Recipient	Result
2014	Sundance Film Festival	Short Film Grand Jury Prize	Todd Rohal	Nominated
2014	Sundance Film Festival	Short Film Special Jury Award for Unique Vision	Todd Rohal	Won
2014	SXSW Film Festival	Grand Jury Award: Midnight Short	Todd Rohal	Nominated
