= Fuck My Son! =

2025 comedy-horror film by Todd Rohal

- Film poster
- Directed by: Todd Rohal
- Written by: Todd Rohal
- Based on: Fuck My Son: A Tale of Terror, Issue One by Johnny Ryan
- Produced by: Gevin Booth; Katie Graham; Tommy Lucente; Andrew Matthews; Tipper Newton; Todd Rohal; Laura Wolford
- Starring: Tipper Newton; Steve Little; Robert Longstreet; Kynzie Colmery; Macon Blair
- Cinematography: Benjamin Kasulke
- Edited by: Todd Rohal
- Music by: Aaron M. Fernandez Olson
- Production companies: Professional Motion Picture; Little Titan; TUbb; Robert Kurtzman MUFX
- Distributed by: Professional Motion Picture
- Release dates: September 11, 2025 (Toronto International Film Festival); October 17, 2025 (United States)
- Running time: 94 minutes
- Country: United States
- Language: English
- Box office: $58,207

Fuck My Son! is a 2025 American comedy horror film written and directed by Todd Rohal and based on the comic Fuck My Son: A Tale of Terror, Issue One by Johnny Ryan. The film stars Tipper Newton, Steve Little, Robert Longstreet, and Kynzie Colmery.

== Premise ==
An elderly woman kidnaps a young woman and her daughter for her mutant son to fornicate with.

== Cast ==
- Tipper Newton as Sandi
- Steve Little as Fabian
- Robert Longstreet as Vermina
- Kynzie Colmery as Bernice
- George Sample III as Officer Lee
- Bryan Connolly as Filthy Pervert
- John Gholson as Stanley
- Vincent James Prendergast as Vincent
- Macon Blair
- Elizabeth Maxwell as Dagney Milstead

== Production ==
The film is based on a comic book by Johnny Ryan and is inspired by John Waters, the works of Troma, and The Texas Chainsaw Massacre. Longstreet portrayed Vermina in a cross gender role.

== Release ==
The film premiered on September 11, 2025, at Toronto International Film Festival.

== Reception ==
On the review aggregator website Rotten Tomatoes, 31% of 13 critics' reviews are positive, with an average rating of 3.8/10. Shade Studios said it is "one of the most outrageous, boundary-pushing, sleazefests I have ever seen."

A review at The Playlist said it has "no redeeming qualities and is an abomination." Horror Press said it is "a movie you can toss on to laugh at with friends before it becomes background noise." Bloody Disgusting scored it 1.5 out of 5 and The Joy of Movies scored it 1 out of 4.

== See also ==
- Hemet, or the Landlady Don't Drink Tea
- Nothing but Trouble
- Thundercrack!
