= Regan Mizrahi =

American child actor

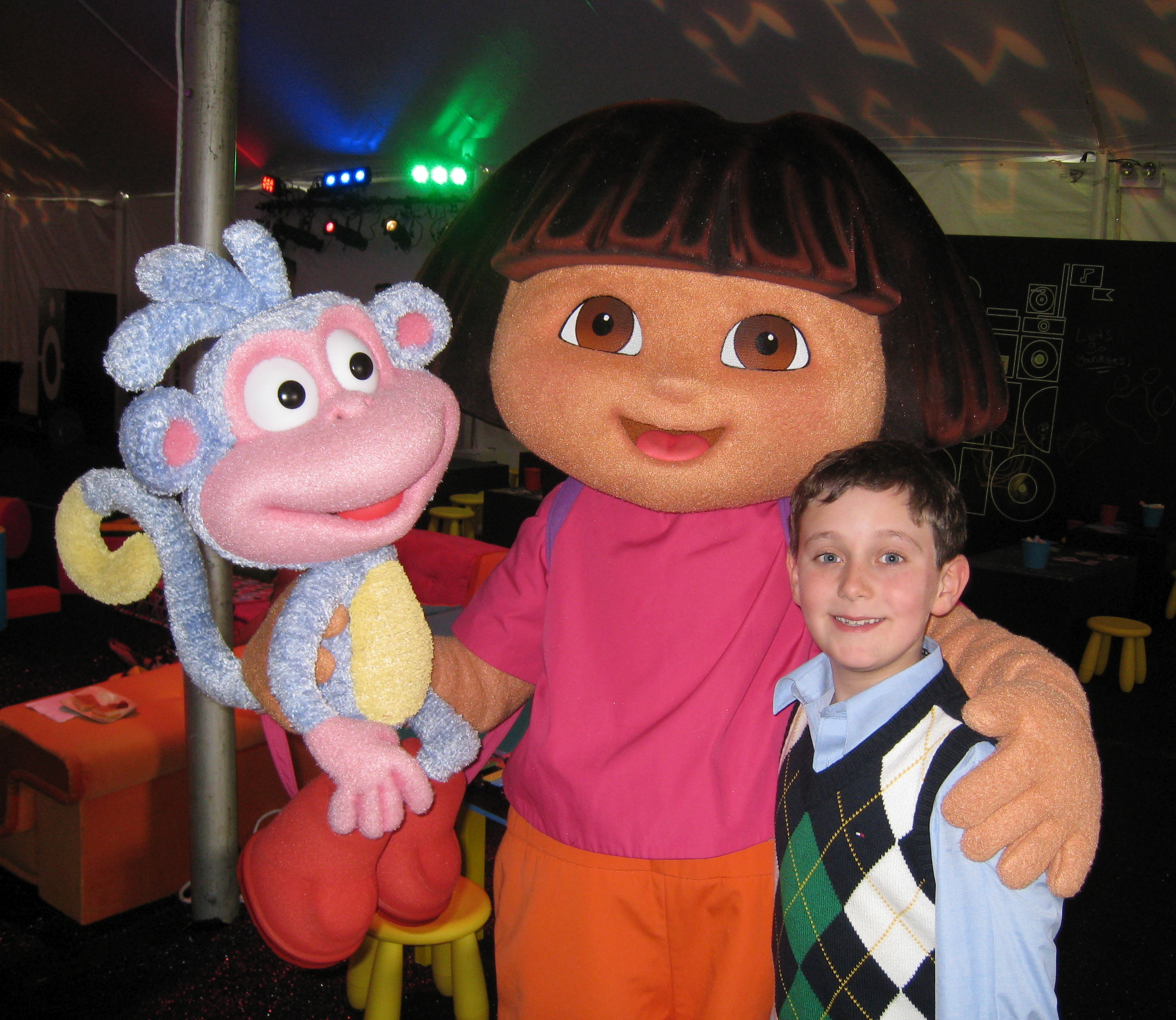
- Regan with characters Dora and Boots from Dora the Explorer
- Born: March 30, 2000 (age 25); New Jersey
- Occupation: Actor
- Years active: 2005–present

Regan Mizrahi (born March 30, 2000) is an American child actor from New Jersey, known for his role as the second voice of Boots the Monkey in the television series Dora the Explorer. He began working professionally at the age of three and has appeared in numerous national television commercials and radio ads. He is the great-grandson of radio personality Nat Hale and is a member of Mensa.

Raised in Closter, New Jersey, Mizrahi attended Northern Valley Regional High School at Demarest where he was runner-up for the 2015 Poetry Out Loud competition. Mizrahi attended the University of Pennsylvania.

Mizrahi has appeared on Rescue Me, Blue Bloods, White Collar, Human Giant, and Saturday Night Live. Some of his film work includes Ice Age: Dawn of the Dinosaurs , Nature Calls, The Pleasure of Your Company, and White Irish Drinkers.

Mizrahi is the founder of Young Performers Against Bullying, a charitable organization that raises funds and awareness for anti-bullying programs in public schools.

Regan was featured in the 34st.com article, "Spending a Day in Regan Mizrahi's Boots, Meet the Penn freshman who used to play Boots on 'Dora the Explorer.'"

== Guest star roles in TV series ==
- Saturday Night Live - NBC - "Justin Timberlake/Jimmy Fallon episode - Twin Bed" - role of "Little Cousin"
- Saturday Night Live - NBC - "Thanksgivies" - role of "Trevor"
- Blue Bloods - CBS (2012) - Episode #312 "The Job" - role of Wyatt Richmond
- Dora's Explorer Girls: Our First Concert - Nickelodeon (2011) - Boots the Monkey
- Nickelodeon Mega Music Fest - Nickelodeon (2010) - Boots the Monkey
- Saturday Night Live - NBC - "Broadview Security" digital short - role of "child intruder"
- Human Giant - MTV - two episodes 2007 - role of little Kevin
- Dora the Explorer - Nickelodeon - Boots the Monkey
- Rescue Me - FX (TV network) - two episodes (#513 and #514) - the role of Timmy
- Saturday Night Live - NBC - "Twas The Night" comedy skit with host John Malkovich
- Miss Lori and Hooper - PBS KIDS - seven episodes 2006 - 2007 - role of "classroom kid"
- White Collar - USA Network - role of "young Mozzie"

== Films ==
- 2012 Nature Calls - Kent
- 2010 White Irish Drinkers - Young Brian
- 2009 Ice Age: Dawn of the Dinosaurs - Additional Voices (voice)/adr loop group
- 2009 Old Dogs - Timmy the roof boy
- 2006 The Pleasure of Your Company aka Wedding Daze - Diner Boy

== Awards and nominations ==
Year	Award	Category	Nominated work	Result
2011	Young Artist Awards	Best Performance In a Voice-Over Role - Young Actor	Dora the Explorer	Won
2012	Young Artist Awards	Best Performance In a TV Series - Guest Starring Young Actor 11–13	White Collar	Nominated
2013	Young Artist Awards	Best Performance In a Voice-Over Role - Young Actor	Dora the Explorer	Nominated

AWARD 2016

Silver Medalist - National Spanish Exam

AWARD 2017

UNIVERSITY OF ROCHESTER - Frederick Douglass and Susan B. Anthony Award

• Demonstrated commitment to understanding and addressing difficult social issues

• Leadership and dedication to community action

• Strong grades and rigorous courses taken in the humanities and social sciences

2018 National Merit Scholarship Competition

2018 Recipient of the John Sousa Award
