= Great World of Sound =

- Directed by: Craig Zobel
- Written by: George Smith; Craig Zobel
- Produced by: David Gordon Green; Melissa Palmer; Richard A. Wright; Craig Zobel
- Starring: Pat Healy; Kene Holliday; Rebecca Mader; Robert Longstreet; Tricia Paoluccio; John Baker
- Cinematography: Adam Stone
- Edited by: Jane Rizzo; Tim Streeto
- Music by: David Wingo
- Production companies: GWS Media; Plum Pictures
- Distributed by: Magnolia Pictures
- Release date: March 30, 2007 (New Directors Festival)
- Running time: 106 minutes
- Country: United States
- Language: English

Great World of Sound is a 2007 comedy film directed by Craig Zobel. Zobel won Breakthrough Director at the Gotham Awards and the film also won the Grand Jury Award at the Atlanta Film Festival.

== Plot ==
Martin, an introverted new transplant to Charlotte, North Carolina, gets roped into a music industry talent scouting scheme called Great World of Sound. GWS is an outfit that engages in the practice of song sharking, a con where amateur musicians pay record companies to be produced. The scheme involves placing classified ads in the newspaper offering "free auditions" to aspiring musicians. The musicians are asked to meet at shabby motel rooms where they are persuaded to make an investment in their career, presumably to cover the costs of recording a demo that will be sent to radio stations. New recruits are told by Shank, the head of GWS, that if they work hard and do good business, they can expect to make $1,000 a month. Martin is paired with Clarence, an outgoing middle-aged man. The unlikely duo turn out to be a successful team for GWS, but this becomes threatened by Martin's suspicions about GWS's true nature and his efforts to help one performer and her "New National Anthem."

== Cast ==
- Pat Healy as Martin
- Kene Holliday as Clarence
- Rebecca Mader as Pam
- Robert Longstreet as Layton
- Tricia Paoluccio as Gloria
- John Baker as Shank

== Production ==
The idea for the film originated from stories Craig Zobel's father would tell him about his experiences working as a radio DJ in Atlanta in the late 1970s. Zobel said his dad worked "for a company similar to the one I ended up creating for the film–they went from town to town sharking people for money under the promise that they would make people famous in the music industry. The thing that I was really drawn to initially, was that the company also manipulated their 'record producers' into thinking they were helping the people." Zobel also said he was inspired by the Albert and David Maysles 1969 documentary Salesman, which is about door-to-door Bible salesmen.

For the audition scenes, people who truly thought they were trying out for a record deal participated. The scenes between the lead actors and the unsuspecting musicians were recorded with hidden cameras. After Zobel explained to the hopefuls that their scenes were for a film and got their consent, the footage was integrated into the final cut, resulting in a blend of fact and fiction.

== Reception ==
The film received generally positive reviews, with an 81% rating based on 43 reviews on Rotten Tomatoes. The site's critics consensus reads, "The Great World of Sound is a charming and unassuming film, thanks to breakthrough performances from Pat Healy and Kene Holiday." On Metacritic it received an average score of 72 based on 13 reviews.

Roger Ebert awarded it 3 out of 4 stars and called it "a confident, sure-handed exercise focusing on the American Dream, turned nightmare." A.O. Scott of The New York Times wrote "Mr. Holliday and Mr. Healy are nimble performers, and they help to lift Great World of Sound above its central gimmick, turning it into a subtle, funny and depressing observation of unspoken race and class tensions." Though Scott found Zobel's practice of featuring real auditionees to be ethically hazy, he acknowledged the scenes "contribute to the downbeat authenticity that is the most striking feature" of the film.

== Awards and nominations ==
At the Gotham Awards, the film was nominated for Best Feature, Breakthrough Director, and Breakthrough Actor (for Holliday). Zobel won for Breakthrough Director. At the Independent Spirit Awards, it was nominated for Best First Feature and Best Supporting Male (for Holliday). At the Atlanta Film Festival, the film won the Narrative Grand Jury Prize and Pat Healy won the Grand Jury Award for Best Actor .
