= The Music Never Stopped (film) =

- Theatrical release poster
- Directed by: Jim Kohlberg
- Written by: Gwyn Lurie; Gary Marks
- Based on: "The Last Hippie" by Oliver Sacks
- Produced by: Neal Moritz
- Starring: J.K. Simmons; Julia Ormond; Mía Maestro; Lou Taylor Pucci
- Cinematography: Stephen Kazmierski
- Edited by: Keith Reamer
- Music by: Paul Cantelon
- Production companies: Essential Pictures; Mr. Tamborine Man
- Distributed by: Roadside Attractions
- Release dates: January 20, 2011 (Sundance Film Festival); March 18, 2011 (United States)
- Running time: 105 minutes
- Country: United States
- Language: English
- Box office: $342,202

The Music Never Stopped is a 2011 American drama film directed by Jim Kohlberg, who makes his directorial debut from a script by Gwyn Lurie and Gary Marks.

It premiered at the 2011 Sundance Film Festival, and was given a limited release in the US on March 18, 2011.

== Plot ==
Henry Sawyer (J.K. Simmons) and his wife, Helen (Cara Seymour) learn that their only son, Gabriel (Lou Taylor Pucci) has been hospitalized with a brain tumor. They have not seen Gabriel in nearly twenty years; as a teenager, Gabriel left the house following an argument with his father. They learn that their son, who had been living as a homeless drifter, suffers from anterograde amnesia due to his tumor and is unable to recall much of his past or gain any new memories. Meanwhile, Henry is made redundant at his workplace, and though he is reluctant to see Gabriel often due to their prior estrangement, Helen begins working in order to pay for Gabriel's treatment, and presses Henry to visit Gabriel daily at his care facility in order to take a more active role in his progress.

Henry recalls that he and Gabriel bonded over Henry's taste in music, and after doing research that suggests that music can be beneficial to helping patients with memory loss, he enlists the help of a therapist, Dianne, to work with Gabriel. To Dianne's surprise, Gabriel, who had previously shown little signs of improvement, becomes eloquent and animated when hearing his favorite music from when he was a teenager. Using the music to prompt him to discuss his memories, it is revealed that Gabriel was named after his uncle, who died in World War II while serving with Henry. Though they were close when Gabriel was a child, they frequently get into arguments when he becomes a teenager over Gabriel's girlfriend and his reluctance to attend college. After one such argument, Henry offers to attend a concert at the high school, where Gabriel is performing with his band. Though Gabriel intends to play one of his father's favorite songs in tribute, the concert is interrupted by another student burning a flag, which Gabriel enthusiastically participates in. Henry is outraged and storms out; back at the family home, Henry rages against Gabriel for disrespecting the flag that his namesake uncle fought and died for, to which Gabriel argues that he is tired of watching his friends getting drafted and dying in Vietnam. Gabriel then runs away, and does not speak to his parents again until the present day.

At first, Henry is upset that Gabriel's progress is not a result of the music that they bonded over, but rather, the music he believed ruined Gabriel's life. At Helen's encouragement and tearful admission that she blames herself for not stopping Gabriel from leaving, Henry trades in his old music for Gabriel's tastes to make an effort to participate in Dianne's work. As a result, he and Gabriel finally connect. Henry admits to pushing Gabriel away, while Gabriel reveals that on the night of the concert, he learned that a close friend was drafted into Vietnam—and though Gabriel never learned of his fate, Henry informs him in the present day that he was killed in the war. Stunned by Gabriel's progress, Henry suggests to Dianne that Gabriel might be able to form new memories if he can connect them to music he's never heard before. Dianne tells him that it is possible, though to not get his hopes up.

Henry suffers a heart attack. While in the hospital, he wins tickets to see The Grateful Dead—Gabriel's favorite band, but who he was never able to see live—due to knowledge gained from his bonding with his son. Gabriel's doctor warns against the idea, as Henry's health is already weak, but Henry tearfully insists that he needs this chance to truly communicate with his son. The two attend the concert and have an incredible time. Gabriel hears Touch of Grey for the first time (which was released after he stopped forming new memories) and after they return to the care facility, they share a tender hug.

Not long afterwards, Henry passes away. Gabriel is upset at the news, having grown accustomed to Henry's visits. During the funeral, the priest plays what Henry claims to have been his favorite song; to the surprise of his gathered friends, it is not his old taste in music, but "Touch of Grey." Gabriel, remembering listening to the song with Henry at the concert, breaks down in tears. While leaving the gravesite, he describes to Helen the first time he heard the song, proving Henry's theory to Dianne to be correct.

== Cast ==
- J.K. Simmons as Henry Sawyer
- Julia Ormond as Dianne Daley
- Mía Maestro as Celia
- Lou Taylor Pucci as Gabriel Sawyer
- Tammy Blanchard as Tamara
- Cara Seymour as Helen Sawyer
- Scott Adsit as Doctor Biscow
- Max Antisell as Young Gabriel Sawyer

== Reception ==
On Rotten Tomatoes the film has a 67% approval rating, based on 49 reviews. On Metacritic it has a score of 60 based on reviews from 13 critics, indicating "generally favorable reviews".

Ty Burr of The Boston Globe remarked the film was "one to remember", also calling it "sentimental, yet so honest and eccentric that it rises above schmaltz". Nathan Rabin of The A.V. Club compared the film's story to The King's Speech, giving praise to J.K. Simmons and Lou Taylor Pucci and calling the film a "powerful, even shattering look at music's power to unite where it once divided".

== Music ==
=== Soundtrack ===
Original music featured in the film is by Paul Cantelon.

Additionally, the following songs were featured in the film and published as a standalone soundtrack album in 2011 on various online digital platforms, including Amazon and Apple Music.

The album features one of the original pieces composed for the film by Paul Cantelon, 'Gabriel's Theme'.

Music by the band the Grateful Dead features prominently in the soundtrack and film.

Track Listing

1. "Till There Was You" (Peggy Lee)
2. "Uncle John's Band" (Grateful Dead)
3. "Sugar Magnolia" (Live) (Grateful Dead)*
4. "I Threw It All Away" (Bob Dylan)
5. "Magic Carpet Ride" (Steppenwolf)
6. "Mellow Yellow" (Donovan)
7. "Suite: Judy Blue Eyes" (Crosby, Stills & Nash)
8. "Not Fade Away/Goin’ Down The Road Feeling Bad" (Live) (Grateful Dead)
9. "Truckin'” (Live) (Grateful Dead)*
10. "Touch Of Grey" (Live) (Grateful Dead)*
11. "Ripple" (Grateful Dead)
12. "Summer Song" (The Tulips)*
13. "Gabriel's Theme" (Paul Cantelon)

* indicates previously unreleased tracks
