= Wedding Daze =

2006 film by Michael Ian Black

- Film poster
- Directed by: Michael Ian Black
- Written by: Michael Ian Black
- Produced by: John Penotti; Jamie Gordon; Sam Hoffman; Joseph Zolfo
- Starring: Jason Biggs; Isla Fisher; Joe Pantoliano; Joanna Gleason; Edward Herrmann; Michael Weston
- Cinematography: Dan Stoloff
- Edited by: Greg Hayden; Alan Oxman
- Music by: Peter Nashel
- Production companies: Media 8 Entertainment; Handprint Entertainment
- Distributed by: Metro-Goldwyn-Mayer (United States); Pathé (United Kingdom)
- Release dates: September 10, 2006 (TIFF); June 1, 2007 (Theatrical)
- Running time: 90 minutes
- Language: English
- Box office: $11.5 million

Wedding Daze (originally titled The Pleasure of Your Company) is a 2006 American romantic comedy film written and directed by Michael Ian Black and starring Jason Biggs and Isla Fisher alongside Joe Pantoliano, Joanna Gleason, Edward Herrmann, and Michael Weston. The film follows Anderson (Biggs), who successfully proposes to stranger Katie (Fisher) after his girlfriend dies.

Wedding Daze premiered at the Toronto International Film Festival on September 10, 2006, and was released theatrically in the United Kingdom by Pathé on June 1, 2007. Metro-Goldwyn-Mayer released the film direct-to-video in the United States on January 15, 2008, after multiple delays to its wide theatrical release.

== Plot ==
Against the advice of his best friend Ted, Anderson proposes in a crowded restaurant to his girlfriend Vanessa, while dressed in a cupid costume. The shock of the unexpected proposal leads to her fatal heart attack.

Utterly devastated and distraught, Anderson quits his job and goes into mourning. A year later, he is still obsessed with his 'perfect' (and now deceased) former girlfriend. While Ted and Anderson are having lunch together in a diner, Ted points out he's been in mourning for longer than the duration of the relationship. To help him move on, Ted persuades him to give romance one more try. To placate his friend, Anderson agrees, looks around, and asks an attractive waitress named Katie to marry him. To both men's utter astonishment, she accepts his proposal.

Katie had a flashback to the previous evening, when she, her boyfriend William, her mother Lois, and stepfather Stuart were playing charades. He has her guess, 'Will you marry me?' and she isn't sure, so she visits her imprisoned dad, Smitty, for advice, which is 'Listen to your heart.' So, when she arrives at work, she tells her friends she's going to accept William. Directly afterwards, she walks into the dining area, and the Anderson proposal happens.

Anderson and Katie go for a walk, warming up to each other. She tells him her parents had a shotgun wedding in The House of Wedded Bliss in Atlantic City. Before they realize what's happening, Katie proposes to him and he accepts.

The same day she moves into his apartment, they call it taking things slow. He rigorously cleans his apartment while she rushes to her parents' to pack her bags. Katie's friend Matador drives her to Anderson's apartment and accidentally hits him. Temporarily knocked unconscious, Anderson talks to Vanessa. He promises her to be ever faithful. However, when he wakes up, he goes ahead with plans to meet Katie's parents, and brings Katie to meet his.

At Katie's mom's and stepdad's house, Anderson proves to be terrible at charades. But trying to bond with her dad, he goes to see his Jewish toy workshop, while Katie comes face-to-face with William. He's been there spying, and he desperately wants her back.

At Anderson's parents' house, things are also awkward. While his dad takes him for a walk and a pep talk, his mother tells Katie she blames Anderson for the death of her would-be daughter-in-law, Vanessa.

Meanwhile, Smitty breaks out of jail to walk Katie down the aisle. He arrives at his ex-wife Lois's house, and through their long-lost passion for each other, their love sparks again, much to Stuart's discomfort.

After an argument over Vanessa, whom Anderson hadn't told Katie about, although he'd had opportunities to do so, their relationship is on the rocks. She comes by the apartment, angrily demanding her things, and they finally declare their mutual affection.

Anderson, Katie, Ted, and the rest of the party drive to Atlantic City in a car from the car dealership where Ted works, under the pretense of test-driving the vehicle. William proceeds to assault Anderson at a rest area outside of Atlantic City. Ted's boss reports the car stolen, and a nervous Ted crashes into a police car, resulting in their arrest.

Meanwhile, Katie's parents know where they're headed and follow, stopping to rob the Tuxedo Depot in preparation for the wedding, and are subsequently arrested. They all end up in the same police station, and Anderson's parents also turn up after he calls them. Katie's parents trick the two cops on duty so the group can escape from the station after taking an officer's gun and locking them in a cell.

At this point, Anderson and Katie reestablish that they want to get married, and for the first time, the whole group is in favor. Now, in a police van, which the police officers let them use, they drive to Atlantic City, and Anderson and Katie finally get married. However, as soon as they step outside, they are all arrested. Anderson and Katie spend their honeymoon in jail.

== Cast ==
- Jason Biggs as Anderson, an unemployed loner who is still obsessed with his dead girlfriend Vanessa and flippantly proposes to Katie and
- Isla Fisher as Katie, a restaurant waitress who agrees to marry Anderson
- Michael Weston as Ted, Anderson's best friend who works at a car dealership
- Ebon Moss-Bachrach as Matador
- Edward Herrmann as Lyle
- Mark Consuelos as Morty
- Chris Diamantopoulos as William, Katie's ex-boyfriend
- Audra Blaser as Vanessa, Anderson's dead girlfriend
- Margo Martindale as Betsy
- Joanna Gleason as Lois
- Matt Malloy as Stuart
- Joe Pantoliano as Smitty
- Robert Trebor as Rabbi Feldman
- Regan Mizrahi as Diner Boy

== Production ==
The film is set in Staten Island, New York City. A lot of the scenes are set in the neighborhood of West New Brighton. The scene outside Gregorio's Florist where Anderson and Katie hug and kiss as well as all the diner scenes at King’s Arms Diner are filmed on Forest Avenue, West Brighton.

Originally titled The Pleasure of Your Company, the film's title was changed to Wedding Daze ahead of its theatrical release. Filming took place in New York in late 2005.

== Release ==
The Pleasure of Your Company premiered at the Toronto International Film Festival on September 10, 2006. The same month, Metro-Goldwyn-Mayer picked up distribution rights for the film and set it for a wide theatrical release in the United States and Canada, while also changing the film's name to Wedding Daze. The film was first set for a theatrical release on March 2, 2007, before being moved to both March 16 and March 23. After being moved again to April 6, Wedding Daze was scheduled for a theatrical release during an unspecified date in the third quarter of 2007.

In March 2007, Wedding Daze's theatrical release was moved to August 17, 2007. On June 1, the film was released theatrically in the United Kingdom by Pathé. In July 2007, Wedding Daze was again moved from its release date and rescheduled for an unspecified date in 2007. The film ultimately ended up receiving a direct-to-video domestic release on January 15, 2008. In its first week of release on home video, the film grossed $1.65 million.

== Reception ==
=== Box office ===
In the United Kingdom, Wedding Daze grossed $1.6 million during its opening weekend, ranking second at the box office behind Pirates of the Caribbean: At World's End.

=== Critical response ===
On the review aggregator website Rotten Tomatoes, 33% of 12 critics' reviews are positive.

Peter Bradshaw of The Guardian gave the film a mixed review, calling the movie "fun" while also criticizing its premise for being "very strained and weird." He praised Chris Diamantopoulos' minor role. Brian Orndorf of eFilmCritic.com gave the film a negative review, describing it as "a creation of utter inconsequence" and "a chore to sit through."

Helen O'Hara of Empire gave the film a positive review, praising the lead performances of Biggs and Fisher.
