= The Rambler (film) =

- Directed by: Calvin Reeder
- Written by: Calvin Reeder
- Produced by: Nate Bolotin; Roger M. Mayer; Christo Dimassis; James Lejsek; Clayton Young
- Starring: Dermot Mulroney; Lindsay Pulsipher; Natasha Lyonne; James Cady
- Cinematography: Dave McFarland
- Edited by: Buzz Pierce
- Music by: Scott Honea; Jed Maheu; Heather McIntosh
- Production companies: Also Known As Pictures; Brooklyn Reptyle Films; WindowLight Pictures; XYZ Films
- Distributed by: Anchor Bay Films
- Release date: January 21, 2013 (Sundance Film Festival)
- Running time: 97 minutes
- Country: United States
- Language: English

The Rambler is a 2013 American independent horror film written and directed by Calvin Reeder and starring Dermot Mulroney, Lindsay Pulsipher, Natasha Lyonne, and James Cady. The film follows a recently released prisoner known only as the Rambler as he travels through the American West in an attempt to reach his brother's ranch, encountering a succession of surreal and violent characters and events.

The film is a feature-length adaptation of Reeder's 2008 short film of the same name. It had its world premiere in the Park City at Midnight section of the 2013 Sundance Film Festival, followed by screenings at festivals including South by Southwest. Anchor Bay Films gave the film a limited theatrical release in the United States beginning on June 7, 2013.

== Plot ==
A man known only as the Rambler is released from prison and returns home to his girlfriend, Cheryl. His attempts to resume his former life are unsuccessful. After Cheryl reveals that she is pregnant by another man and their relationship collapses, the Rambler decides to accept an offer from his brother, who runs a ranch in Oregon and has promised him work and a place to stay.

The Rambler sets out hitchhiking across the American West. His journey becomes increasingly surreal as he moves through isolated towns and encounters a succession of eccentric and threatening strangers. He becomes involved with Dale, a fight promoter who places him in a series of bare-knuckle fights, including a bout against a man armed with a hook.

He repeatedly encounters a traveling scientist who claims to have invented a machine capable of recording people's dreams onto VHS tapes. The scientist travels with preserved bodies he calls mummies and demonstrates the machine on various subjects, but the process causes their heads to explode. The Rambler later encounters the scientist again and discovers that he has used the device on himself with similarly disastrous results.

During the journey the Rambler also repeatedly meets a mysterious woman known only as the Girl. She appears in different locations and circumstances, and the two develop a romantic connection. However, she is repeatedly injured or killed in apparently contradictory episodes, only to reappear later, blurring the distinction between the Rambler's dreams, hallucinations, and reality.

The Rambler is eventually picked up by a driver obsessed with the film Frankenstein and with mutilated women. The Rambler finally reaches his brother's ranch but finds himself unable to settle into his brother's domestic life and leaves again. After the Rambler and the driver encounter the badly injured Girl on the road, the driver attempts to save her. She dies and subsequently transforms into a monstrous figure as the house catches fire. The Rambler watches the house burn.

== Cast ==
- Dermot Mulroney as The Rambler
- Lindsay Pulsipher as The Girl
- Natasha Lyonne as Cheryl
- James Cady as The Scientist
- Scott Sharot as The Driver
- Paul Blott as Dale
- Robyn Reede as Roberta
- Christopher Dempsey as Bob
- Carrie Lazar as Susan
- Christo Dimassis as Kevin

== Production ==
The Rambler was developed from a 2008 short film of the same name, which screened at both the Sundance Film Festival and South by Southwest. Reeder played the title character in the short. Shortly after completing it, he began developing a feature-length version, although it took several years to secure financing.

Reeder said he never intended to reprise his role as the Rambler in the feature and always expected another actor to take the part. According to Reeder, filmmaker David Gordon Green personally contacted Dermot Mulroney on his behalf. Mulroney subsequently read the screenplay and remained attached to the project even after its financing temporarily collapsed, a period Reeder said lasted approximately nine months.

Principal photography began on April 15, 2012, in Roswell, New Mexico. The film was produced by XYZ Films, Brooklyn Reptyle Films, and AKA Pictures (Also Known As Pictures). Michael Benaroya financed the production through AKA Pictures, with Nate Bolotin, Roger M. Mayer, Christo Dimassis, James Lejsek, and Clayton Young credited as producers.

Reeder initially intended to shoot the film on Super 16 mm film. After the production was required to obtain a completion bond, however, the additional expense left insufficient funds for film stock and processing, and the production switched to digital cinematography. Reeder described the resulting film as visually broader than his earlier feature The Oregonian, emphasizing wide-open landscapes and a more expansive score.

== Release ==
Before its Sundance premiere, Anchor Bay Films acquired theatrical, home entertainment, television, and digital distribution rights for North America, the United Kingdom, and Australia.

The Rambler had its world premiere on January 21, 2013, in the Park City at Midnight section of the 2013 Sundance Film Festival. The Sundance Institute had announced the film as part of the section in November 2012, describing all of that year's Park City at Midnight selections as world premieres.

The film subsequently screened in the Midnighters section of the 2013 South by Southwest festival, with screenings on March 9, March 11, and March 14. It also screened at the Boston Underground Film Festival and at the Calgary Underground Film Festival, where it was presented as its Canadian premiere.

The film began a limited U.S. theatrical release in New York City on June 7, 2013. It opened in Los Angeles the following week and subsequently played engagements in Houston, Dallas, and Seattle.

=== Home media ===
Anchor Bay released the film on DVD and Blu-ray on June 25, 2013.

== Accolades ==
At the second Full Moon Horror and Fantasy Film Festival in Biertan, Transylvania, The Rambler received the 2013 Jury Award for Best Feature Film. The jury cited the film's exploration of the unknown, its complexity, and its distinctive cinematic world.

== Reception ==
On Rotten Tomatoes, The Rambler holds an approval rating of 33% based on 12 reviews. On Metacritic, the film has a weighted average score of 32 out of 100 based on six critics, indicating "generally unfavorable" reviews.

Amy Nicholson of the Los Angeles Times described the film as a "hallucinatory hitchhiker horror" and praised aspects of its visual presentation while criticizing its lack of narrative meaning.

Drew Hunt of Slant Magazine gave the film a positive review, describing it as "sinister, comical, aggravating, and audacious." He compared its use of dream logic to David Lynch's Inland Empire and praised Reeder's rejection of conventional narrative structure.

The film received more negative notices from several other critics. Metacritic recorded scores of 40 out of 100 from Rob Nelson of Variety, 30 from Andy Webster of The New York Times, and 20 from Justin Lowe of The Hollywood Reporter.
