= The Night Stalker (2016 film) =

2016 American drama film

- Directed by: Megan Griffiths
- Screenplay by: Megan Griffiths
- Produced by: Alisa Tager; Matthew Brady
- Starring: Lou Diamond Phillips; Bellamy Young; Chelle Sherrill; Benjamin Barrett
- Cinematography: Quyen Tran
- Edited by: Celia Beasley
- Music by: St Kilda
- Distributed by: A&E Networks
- Release date: June 4, 2016 (Seattle International Film Festival)
- Running time: 89 minutes
- Country: United States
- Language: English

The Night Stalker is a 2016 American drama film about the serial killer Richard Ramirez. It was directed by Megan Griffiths, who wrote the screenplay, and stars Lou Diamond Phillips, Bellamy Young, Chelle Sherrill, and Benjamin Barrett. The film was produced by Alisa Tager and Matthew Brady.

== Plot ==
In Texas, a drifter faces the death penalty in just a few days. His only hope is that his lawyers can persuade the serial killer Richard Ramirez to confess to the crime instead. His legal team includes Kit, who is tasked with traveling to California, and visiting Ramirez in San Quentin State Prison in an attempt to persuade him to confess. She stays in a budget hotel and spends time in a bar during her time off.

The murder in Texas took place before Ramirez's first known killing. Kit initially speaks with Ramirez by phone through glass; he refuses to reveal anything until they meet in a visitation room. There, he demands she remove her gold jewelry; he says that he is a Satanist, and gold is offensive to Satan because it is God's metal. He remains uncooperative because guards are in the room, but suggests that they can have privacy if she says she's his lawyer. Even then he remains uncooperative and insulting, demanding that she reveal personal details about herself to make herself interesting enough that she deserves to know more about him. As a child, she lived in the same neighborhood as one of Ramirez's notorious crimes, and she was obsessed with his crime spree, which was one of her inspirations to become a lawyer.

== Cast ==
- Bellamy Young as Kit
- Lou Diamond Phillips as Richard Ramirez
- Mark Kelly as Joe
- Annalisa Cochrane as Mary
- Alice Rietveld as Inez
- Zoe McLane as Julia
- Louis Herthum as Jed
- Jennifer Lafleur as Young Elena
- Austin Fryberger as Eric
- Eddie Ramos as Ruben
- Louis Fasanaro as Bar Regular
- Elester Latham as Charlie
- Evan Kishiyama as Youko
- Victoria Cruz as Motel Victim
- Bernardo Badillo as Roberto
- Chelle Sherrill as Young Kit
- Eddie Martinez as Mike Ramirez
- Samantha Neyland as Emily
- David A. Garcia as Night Stalker Capturer
- Julian Alexander as Trainer
- Andrew Ruiz as 12-year-old Richard Ramirez
- Benjamin Barrett as Richard Ramirez
- Kimberly Jürgen as Doreen / Young Doreen
- Tony Hernandez as Victor
- Mattias Ramos as Latino Man
- Gino Lee as Burnout Kid

== Release ==
The Night Stalker premiered on June 4, 2016 at the Seattle International Film Festival.
