= Steve Little (actor) =

American actor

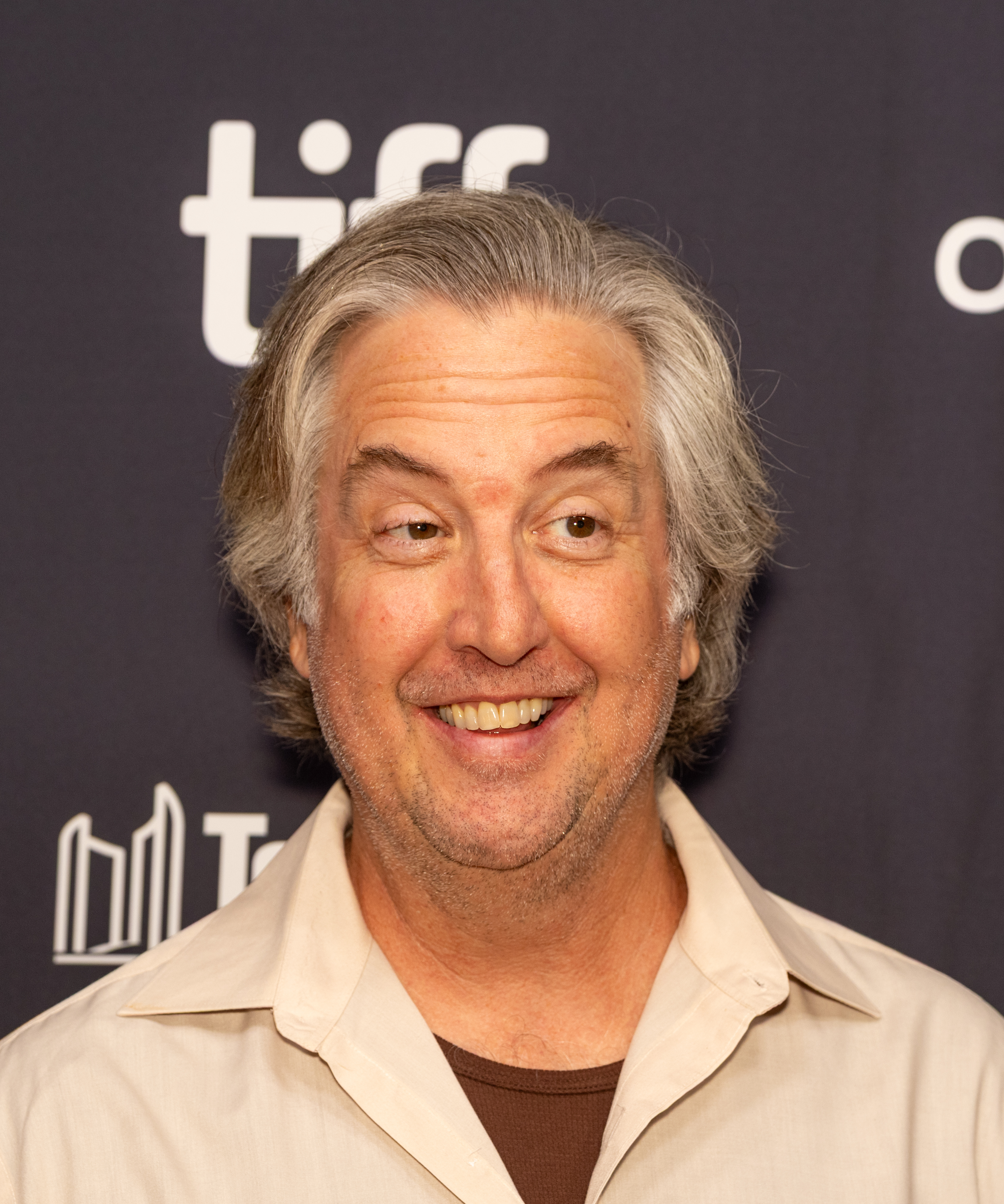
- Little at the 2025 Toronto International Film Festival
- Occupations: Actor; comedian; writer
- Years active: 1999–present

Steve Little is an American actor, comedian and writer, best known for his roles on the shows Camp Lazlo, The Marvelous Misadventures of Flapjack, Eastbound & Down, Adventure Time, The Grinder, and Haters Back Off. He also used to co-star on the Adult Swim series Neon Joe, Werewolf Hunter.

== Career ==
Little was a member of The Groundlings, an improvisational and sketch comedy troupe based in Los Angeles. Veteran animator Joe Murray encountered Little and asked him if he was interested in being a voice actor and decided that Little matched the "Dung Beetle" characters Chip and Skip on Camp Lazlo.

Following a period working as both writer and actor, he starred in the 2011 Todd Rohal film The Catechism Cataclysm. He has also voiced characters such as Dr. Barber, and Lolly Poopdeck on The Marvelous Misadventures of Flapjack, as well as The Duke of Nuts, Turtle Princess, Abracadaniel and Peppermint Butler on the Cartoon Network series Adventure Time.

Little played the recurring character Stevie Janowski, a middle-school band teacher who idolized and served as the personal assistant of the main character, Kenny Powers, on the HBO series Eastbound & Down. He hadn't met Danny McBride or the showrunners before auditioning for the role, but the family atmosphere was "very welcoming." After being cast, Little based some of Stevie's mannerisms and emotions on people he went to high school with.

Subsequent to Eastbound & Down, he appeared in series such as 30 Rock and The Office, and Romantic Encounters.

Little co-starred in two of Quentin Dupieux's surreal films, Wrong and Wrong Cops. In 2014, he starred in short film Rat Pack Rat, which won jury award at 2014 Sundance Film Festival. In 2015, he starred as Cleve Menu in the Adult Swim show Neon Joe, Werewolf Hunter.

From 2016 to 2017, he acted in the Netflix series Haters Back Off as Miranda Sings' uncle Jim alongside Colleen Ballinger and Angela Kinsey. During that same year he portrayed the character of George in the comedy horror film Another Evil.

In 2025, Little starred in Fuck My Son! by Todd Rohal.

== Voice acting ==
| Year | Title | Role |
|---|---|---|
| 2005–08 | Camp Lazlo | Chip and Skip |
| 2008–10 | The Marvelous Misadventures of Flapjack | Dr. Barber, Lolly Poopdeck, additional voices |
| 2010–18 | Adventure Time | The Duke of Nuts, Abracadaniel, Turtle Princess, Peppermint Butler, additional voices |
| 2011–12 | Secret Mountain Fort Awesome | Slog |
| 2015–20 | Mike Tyson Mysteries | Alex Schmidt, Miles Kleffman |
| 2016 | Regular Show | Spacey McSpaceTree |
| 2019 | Rocko's Modern Life: Static Cling | Cowboy, Mineman, Construction Worker |
| 2020 | The Midnight Gospel | Captain Bryce |
| 2021 | Adventure Time: Distant Lands | Turtle Princess, Peppermint Butler, Gate Guardian |
| 2023-present | Kiff | Glarbin Gloobin |
