= The Original (Westworld) =

- Westworld episode
- Episode no.: Season 1 Episode 1
- Directed by: Jonathan Nolan
- Story by: Jonathan Nolan; Lisa Joy; Michael Crichton
- Teleplay by: Jonathan Nolan; Lisa Joy
- Cinematography by: Paul Cameron
- Editing by: Stephen Semel; Marc Jozefowicz
- Production code: 276083
- Original air date: October 2, 2016
- Running time: 68 minutes

Guest appearances
- Louis Herthum as Peter Abernathy; Steven Ogg as Rebus; Michael Wincott as Old Bill; Eddie Rouse as Kissy; Brian Howe as Sheriff Pickett; Demetrious Grosse as Deputy Foss; Ptolemy Slocum as Sylvester; Leonardo Nam as Felix Lutz; Kyle Bornheimer as Clarence; Bradford Tatum as Bartender / New Peter Abernathy; Lena Georgas as Lori; Currie Graham as Craig; Trevante Rhodes as Bachelor

Episode chronology
← Previous —	Next → "Chestnut"

"The Original" is the first episode in the first season premiere of the HBO science fiction western thriller television series Westworld. The teleplay was written by series co-creators Jonathan Nolan and Lisa Joy, who also receive story credit with Michael Crichton, writer and director of the 1973 film upon which the series is based. The episode was directed by Nolan, and is dedicated to the memory of Eddie Rouse, who played Kissy.

"The Original" introduces the eponymous Western-themed amusement park from the perspectives of both the androids and the humans. It received positive reviews from critics, who praised the visuals, performances of the cast, story, thematic elements and world-building.

== Plot summary ==
In the 2050s, Delos Inc. manages and produces futuristic amusement parks in the South China Sea. These parks do not actually have rides but rather adventures and narratives for the people, with each park having a variety of different adventures that are fit for anyone. Among the most popular parks is Westworld, a huge Western-themed park where wealthy human guests can interact with lifelike android "hosts", programmed to run through a daily narrative, without memory of prior days' events, and interact with guests. As hosts are unable to harm guests, guests often live out their darkest desires, including violent, sadistic and sexual ones.

Hosts are artificially manufactured and don't exhibit some normal human reactions; for example, they don't react to flies crawling over their faces. They can be put in hibernation or into other special states by code phrases said by park operators.

Dolores says goodbye to her father Peter and travels into Sweetwater for supplies where she meets Teddy. They rekindle their old flame, and she invites him back to her farm, but when they arrive they hear shooting inside the house. They find Peter beaten by two bandits, Walter and Rebus, bragging about raping and killing his wife. Teddy shoots and kills the bandits but finds he cannot kill a third approaching figure from elsewhere, the Man in Black. The Man in Black reveals he is a guest, kills Teddy, and then drags Dolores off. He is upset she does not recognize him after thirty years of visits.

The next day, the Sweetwater sheriff host malfunctions. At the operations center in the central Mesa, they find the problem due to the recent Reveries update from park creator Dr. Robert Ford, but lead programmer Bernard suggests they leave the other hosts with Reveries in place to help debug. That night, the bandit Walter, also updated with Reveries, turns violent on his men. Park QA director Theresa orders all hosts with Reveries to be brought in and checked, using a temporary narrative of a bandit massacre to hide this from the guests. The Man in Black tracks down a specific host, kills and scalps him to find an image of a map under his scalp.

The next morning, Peter finds a guest's photograph of the outside world, and he becomes confused. He whispers something to Dolores before she leaves. In town, the massacre starts. At the Mesa, Ford learns Peter wanted to tell Dolores the true nature of the park, while head of security Ashley Stubbs interviews Dolores who says Peter only told her "These violent delights have violent ends" but does not understand its meaning. After careful analysis, all hosts but Peter and Walter are cleared to return, while Peter and Walter are put into storage.

Dolores, Peter and other hosts are periodically questioned via checklists as part of QA. Dolores is asked whether she can hurt any living being and she answers resounding "no".

The next day, Dolores begins her usual routine, unaware of the surrogate in Peter's place for her father. While watching the sunrise, she swats and kills a fly that lands on her neck.

== Production ==
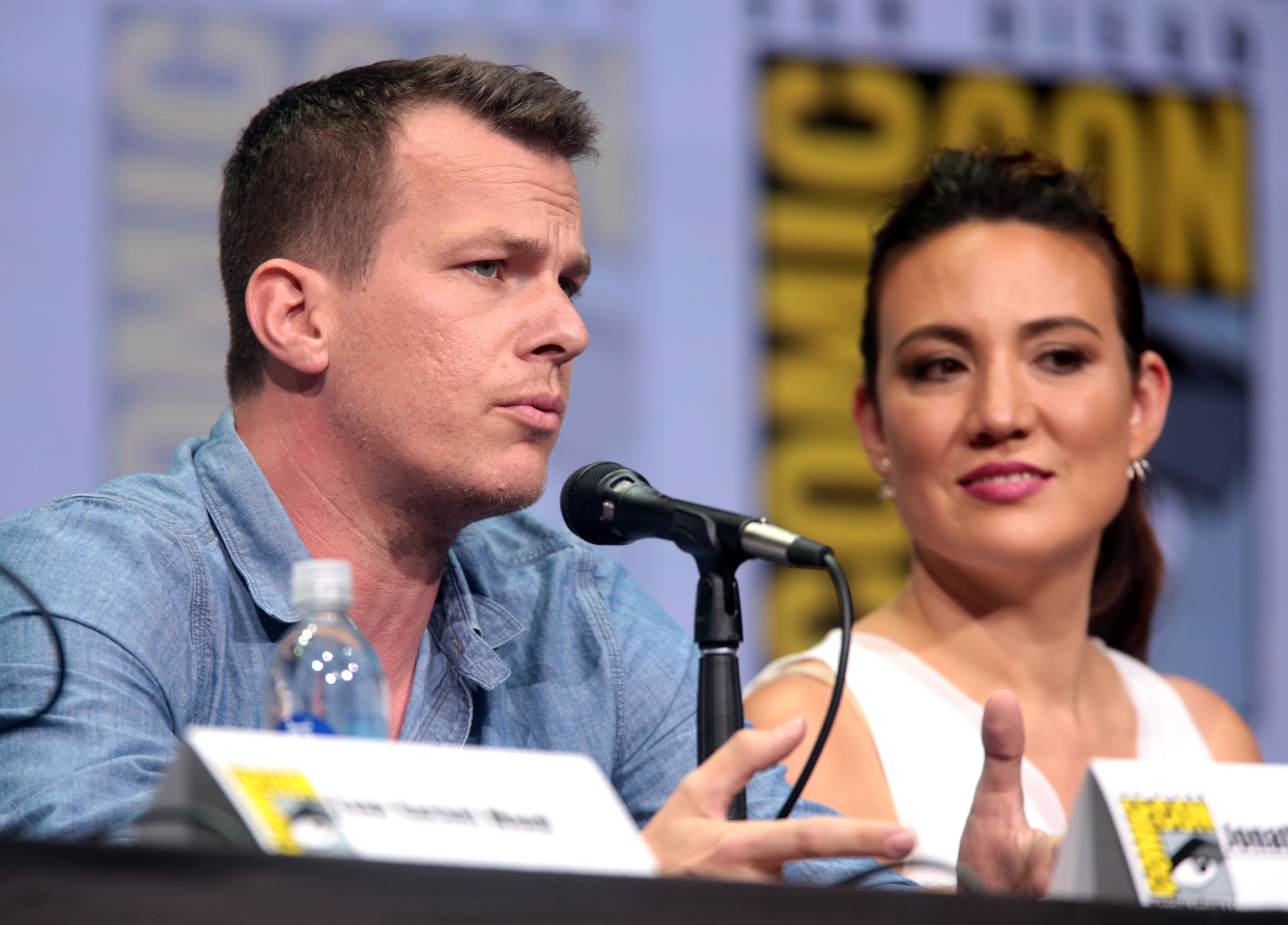
Jonathan Nolan and Lisa Joy co-wrote the episode.

"The Original" was written by series co-creators Jonathan Nolan and Lisa Joy, based on the premise of the 1973 film of the same name by Michael Crichton. The episode had a budget in the range of $25 million.

=== Filming ===
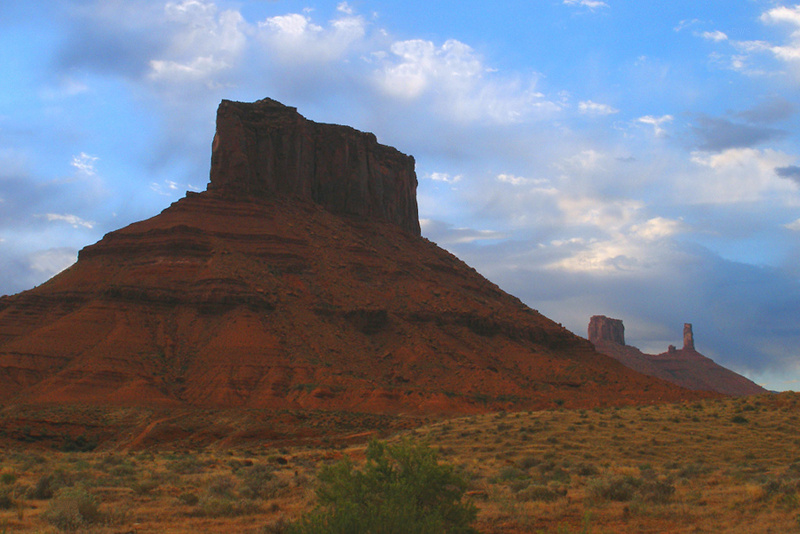
Castle Valley in Utah was one of the filming locations for the episode.

Directed by Nolan, "The Original" was filmed on August 29, 2014 in and around Los Angeles, California. Locations in California included Santa Clarita, at Melody Ranch in Newhall and at Paramount Ranch in Agoura. The episode was also filmed in southern Utah, specially Castle Valley and Fisher Valley.

=== Music ===
The score is composed by Ramin Djawadi. The episode also features piano and orchestral interpretations of Soundgarden's "Black Hole Sun" and The Rolling Stones' "Paint it Black". "Ain't No Grave" by Johnny Cash was played over the end credits.

In an interview, Djawadi spoke about the modern songs used in the episode. He said, "The show has an anachronistic feel to it, It's a Western theme park, and yet it has robots in it, so why not have modern songs? And that's a metaphor in itself, wrapped up in the overall theme of the show." Djawadi continued, "What's so great about using these pieces instead of the score is that they are known melodies, which enhances the idea that this is all scripted". He noted, "'Paint It Black' happens during a really big action scene, and it has all these great ups and downs — the shooting, the talking — and so I bring it down and then back up a bit, which was a lot of fun to arrange for the orchestra."

== Reception and legacy ==
=== Ratings ===
"The Original" was viewed by 1.96 million American households on its initial viewing. The episode also acquired a 0.8 rating in the 18–49 demographic. The premiere drew 3.3 million viewers over three airings that night and early viewing on HBO’s streaming platforms, making it the most viewed series premiere HBO has had since True Detective. In the United Kingdom, the episode was seen by 1.7 million viewers on Sky Atlantic (the channel's highest-rated broadcast that week).

=== Critical reception ===
"The Original" received critical acclaim from critics with particular praise towards the visuals, story, the performances of the cast, thematic elements, and world building. The episode currently has a score of 100% on Rotten Tomatoes and has an average rating of 9.2 out of 10 based on 26 reviews. The site's consensus reads "The Original lays the vivid playground of Westworld before us in all its detail-heavy, morality-questioning, and mystery-filled glory."

Eric Goldman of IGN wrote in his review of the episode, "HBO's Westworld makes a strong first impression with its excellent premiere, as a theme park provides the setting for a fascinating exploration of the human—and not so human—psyche." He gave the episode a 9 out of 10. Scott Tobias of The New York Times wrote in his review of the episode; "Based on the first episode of HBO's Westworld alone, creators Jonathan Nolan and Lisa Joy have built themselves a better model—which, in Crichton’s thinking, should increase the likelihood of things going awry. Crichton never invited us to think of the androids as anything more than exceptionally lifelike machines". Zack Handlen of The A.V. Club wrote in his review, "'The Original' is a terrific way to start. There are all sorts of possibilities here, and actors who don't get much to do (Thandie Newton, hello) but who'll presumably be more important as events unfold. And it's impressive to see how, with just some minor tweaking, the show manages to remake Westworld into something distinctively new." He gave the episode an A−. Liz Shannon Miller of IndieWire wrote in her review, "It's just the first episode, and already that control seems in flux as more questions arise. Can't wait to get a few more answers." She gave the episode an A−. Erik Kain of Forbes also reviewed the episode, saying, "I found the season premiere of Westworld gripping from start to finish. It ended on the perfect note, though I wish it had gone on much longer. I can’t wait for episode two, and hope desperately that this show continues to be as good as its opening episode. I love the mystery. I love the juxtaposition of two of my favorite genres—Westerns and science-fiction—and I love the sense of dread hanging over everything."

=== Accolades ===
Year	Award	Category	Nominee(s)	Result	Ref.
2016	American Society of Cinematographers	Outstanding Achievement in Cinematography in Movie, Miniseries, or Pilot for Television	Paul Cameron	Nominated	
2016	American Cinema Editors	Best Edited One Hour Series for Non-Commercial Television	Stephen Semel and Marc Jozefowicz	Nominated	
2017	Art Directors Guild	ADG Excellence in Production Design Award for One-Hour Period or Fantasy Single-Camera Series	Nathan Crowley	Won	
2017	Cinema Audio Society Awards	Outstanding Achievement in Sound Mixing – Television Series – One Hour	John Pritchett, Keith Rogers, Scott Weber, Mark Kondracki, Geordy Sincavage	Nominated	
2017	Directors Guild of America	Dramatic Series	Jonathan Nolan	Nominated	
2017	Costume Designers Guild Awards	Outstanding Period Television Series	Trish Summerville	Nominated	
2017	Primetime Emmy Awards	Outstanding Makeup for a Single-Camera Series (Non-Prosthetic)	Christien Tinsley, Myriam Arougheti, Gerald Quist, Lydia Milars, Ed French	Won	
2017	Primetime Emmy Awards	Outstanding Production Design for a Narrative Contemporary or Fantasy Program (One Hour or More)	Nathan Crowley, Naaman Marshall, Julie Ochipinti	Nominated	
2017	Primetime Emmy Awards	Outstanding Cinematography for a Single-Camera Series (One Hour)	Paul Cameron	Nominated	
2017	Primetime Emmy Awards	Outstanding Period/Fantasy Costumes for a Series, Limited Series, or Movie	Trish Summerville, Jo Kissack, Lynda Foote	Nominated	
2017	Primetime Emmy Awards	Outstanding Prosthetic Makeup for a Series, Limited Series, Movie or a Special	Christien Tinsley, Hiro Yada, Georgia Allen, Gerald Quist, Myriam Arougheti, Jason Hamer	Nominated	

=== In other media ===
It was parodied by RiffTrax, consisting of Mystery Science Theater 3000 alumni Michael J. Nelson, Kevin Murphy and Bill Corbett, on December 6, 2017.
