= Tipper Newton =

American actress and musician

- Born: Overland Park, Kansas
- Education: Columbia College Chicago
- Occupations: Actress, filmmaker, musician
- Years active: 2006-present

Tipper Newton is an American actress and musician best known for her role as Karen in The Mindy Project and Sinnomin in The Guest Book.

== Biography ==
Tipper Newton was born in Overland Park, Kansas and raised in Omaha, Nebraska. She graduated from Columbia College Chicago with a B.A. in film. On the side she performs with her power-pop band Color TV.

Newton had a recurring appearance as Karen, the girlfriend of Colette, on The Mindy Project. She made a guest appearance on Agents of S.H.I.E.L.D. as Roxy Glass in the episode "The Totally Excellent Adventures of Mack and The D".

== Filmography ==
=== Film ===
Film roles
Year	Title	Role	Notes
2006	LOL	Walter	
2007	Hannah Takes the Stairs	Minnie	
2007	The Timebox Twins	Girl	Short film
2009	The Mountain, the River and the Road	Cat	
2010	Parts + Labor	Samantha	Short film
2010	On Holiday	Shee	
2011	Uncle Kent	Party Guest	
2011	The Oregonian	Julie	
2011	The Lie	Jeannie	
2011	Captain Fork	Superfan	Short film
2012	The ABCs of Death	Baby Mama	Segment: "M is for Miscarriage"
2013	9 Full Moons	Sadie	
2013	Carlos Spills the Beans	Lady	
2014	The Lawful Truth	Carmen Michuda	
2015	Uncle Kent 2	Minnie the Housekeeper	
2015	Southbound	Jesse	Segment: "Jailbreak" and "The Way In"
2015	Review		Short film
2015	Broken Mast		Short film
2017	Brad Cuts Loose	Janine	Short film
2019	Crude Oil		Short film
2019	I Lost My Body	Librarian (voice)	English version
2020	Bad Day Sam	Sam	Short film
2022	Who Invited Them	Teeny	
2025	Fuck My Son!	Sandi	

=== Television ===
Television roles
Year	Title	Role	Notes
2007	Young American Bodies	Haley	Episode: "Maggie's Big Move"
2010	The Geniuses	Dancer	TV Pilot
2013	Cat Agent	Kitty Pittsburgh (voice)	1 episode
2015	Adventure Time	Lamp / Wine Glass / Additional Voices	Episode: "Friends Forever"
2015	Adventure Time	Emperor / Head Guard / Turtle / Guards (voice)	Episode: "On the Lam"
2016	Kino-Edwards Picture Show	Various	Main cast
2016	Take My Wife	Hotel Desk Clerk	Episode: "Holiday Special"
2017	Love	Kali	Episode: "Friends Night Out"
2017	The Mindy Project	Karen	Recurring (Seasons 5 and 6)
2017	Adam Ruins Everything	New Researcher / V.O. Researcher	Episode: "Adam Ruins Science"
2017	Curb Your Enthusiasm	Valentina	Episode: "Fatwa!"
2017-2018	The Guest Book	Sinnomin	Main cast (Season 1); Guest (Season 2; Episode: "Invisible Son")
2018	Hunky Boys Go Ding-Dong	Nancy / Librarian	TV Pilot
2019	In the Dark	Gloria	Episode: "The Graduate"
2020	Agents of S.H.I.E.L.D.	Roxy Glass	2 episodes
2020	Aunty Donna's Big Ol' House of Fun	Crying Woman/Swat/Neighbour	2 episodes
