= The Oregonian (film) =

- Theatrical release poster
- Directed by: Calvin Reeder
- Written by: Calvin Reeder
- Produced by: Roger M. Mayer; Christian Palmer; Christo Dimassis; Steven Schardt; Elana Krausz; Wen Marcoux; Ryan Adams; Scott Honea; Joey Marcoux
- Starring: Lindsay Pulsipher
- Cinematography: Ryan Adams
- Edited by: Buzz Pierce
- Music by: Scott Honea; Jed Maheu; Calvin Reeder
- Distributed by: Factory 25
- Release dates: January 24, 2011 (Sundance); June 8, 2012 (United States)
- Running time: 81 minutes
- Country: United States
- Language: English

The Oregonian is a 2011 horror film directed by Calvin Reeder. The movie premiered at the 2011 Sundance Film Festival and was given a limited release beginning on June 8, 2012, partially as a result of a successful Kickstarter campaign. The Oregonian received a DVD release in early 2013.

The film stars Lindsay Pulsipher as a young woman who, after waking up from a car crash with no recollection of what happened, journeys through a surreal landscape and meets multiple bizarre characters.

== Plot ==
The movie follows a young woman from Oregon (Lindsay Pulsipher), who gets into a car accident and as a result, finds herself in a surreal landscape. She has complete amnesia and cannot remember what has happened or even who she is. As she wanders around in an attempt to find help and safety, she comes across several increasingly bizarre people.

== Cast ==
- Lindsay Pulsipher as The Oregonian
- Robert Longstreet as Herb
- Matt Olsen as Blond Stranger
- Lynne Compton as Red Stranger
- Roger M. Mayer as Omelette Man
- Barlow Jacobs as Bud
- Tipper Newton as Julie
- Chadwick Brown as Ronnie
- Jed Maheu as Murph
- Zumi Rosow as Carlotta
- Scott Honea as James
- Christian Palmer as Handsome Deadman
- Christo Dimassis as Bud's Friend
- Mandy M Bailey as Stranger
- Meredith Binder as Stranger

== Reception ==
Critical response for The Oregonian has been mixed. On the review aggregator website Rotten Tomatoes, 44% of 9 critics' reviews are positive, with an average rating of 4.9/10. On Metacritic, the film has a weighted average score of 46 out of 100, based on 4 critics, indicating "mixed or average reviews".

Michael Nordine from Slant Magazine rated the film one and a half out of four stars, calling the film "a jumbled mess that can’t make its deliberate incoherence interesting". Dennis Harvey of Variety offered the film similar criticism, writing, "Reeder shows a knack for unsettling audiovisual textures, but once it’s clear The Oregonian will offer no real storyline or explanations, viewer patience wears thin".

The film was not without its supporters' David D'Arcy from Screen Daily commended the film's atmosphere, soundtrack, and Pulsipher's performance. David Fear of Time Out rated the film three out of five stars, writing, "though Reeder’s attempts to unnerve sometimes veer close to enfant terrible posturing, The Oregonian knows how to work its unpleasantness to primo psychotronic effect". Eric Kohn from IndieWire awarded the film a score B+, writing, "Alternately creepy, puzzling and assaulting on the senses, at best The Oregonian functions as a nightmarish headtrip with ample doses of dark comedy". Kohn, however, criticized the film's third act, which he felt 'failed to put its compelling fragments together'.
