= Yi Zhou =

Chinese artist

- 周依
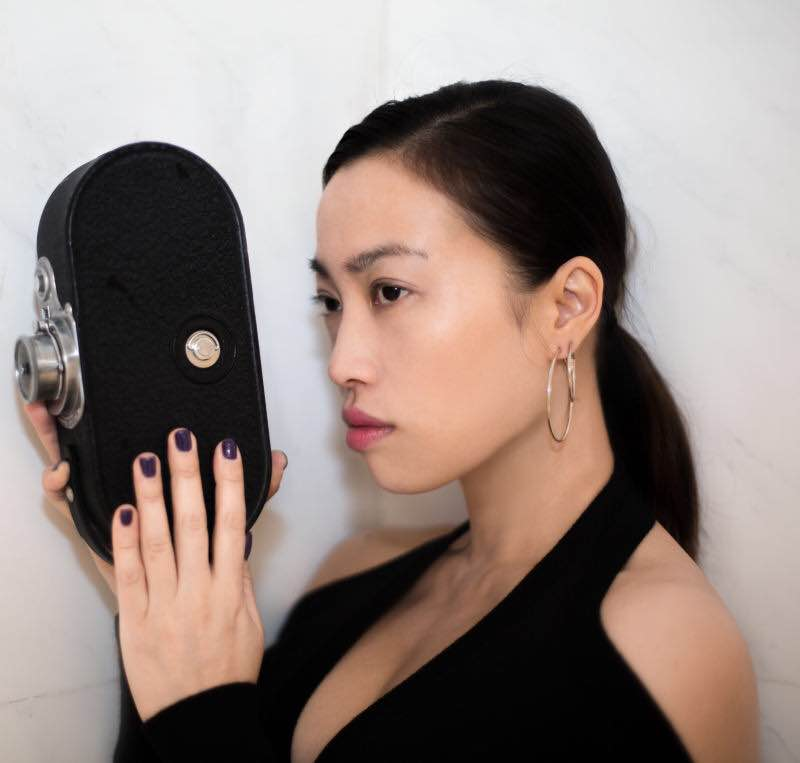
- Yi Zhou in 2017
- Born: 1978 (age 47–48); Shanghai, China
- Education: American University of Paris; London School of Economics
- Known for: Multimedia art and short films
- Website: www.yizhoustudio.com

Yi Zhou (Chinese: 周依; pinyin: Zhōu Yī) (born 1978) is a Chinese film director, writer, producer and multimedia artist.

== Early life ==
Yi Zhou was born in Shanghai in 1978. When she was nine years old, she moved to Rome. She studied at the American University of Paris and later graduated from the London School of Economics. After leaving university, she embarked on a career in Paris as an artist.

== Artistic career ==
Zhou's first major exhibit was for the Jérôme de Noirmont gallery in Paris in 2002. She installed her sculpture and video projection work Paradise in the Piazza della Signoria and the Palazzo Vecchio in Florence in 2006.

In 2008, the Comité Vendôme asked Zhou to create a public project for Place Vendôme. She created artwork based on the symbolic meaning of the Vendôme Column that gives its name to the square. Zhou created two 8-meter-high columns, located on a diagonal axis with the Vendôme Column as the central point. Each of the two new columns is composed of 1280 small towers. The project was commissioned by art historian Diana Widmaier Picasso and was presented at the World Expo in Shanghai.

In 2010, Zhou relocated back to China and founded YiZhouStudio, a branded content and creative production company based in Shanghai and Hong Kong. She has been compared to Yoko Ono and Cindy Sherman by Vogue China as an active image-maker both in front of and behind the camera. In 2011, Zhou was named art director of the Tudou video-charing website. She also serves as an art and fashion advisory member at Sina.com, which owns Sina Weibo.

From 2010 to 2011, Zhou was brand ambassador for Clarins, which also sponsored her solo show at the 54th Venice Biennale in 2011. Since 2012, she has collaborated with the Italian luxury eyewear brand Persol, as well as the luxury brands Hogan, Pringle of Scotland, and Chanel.

In 2011, her artwork DVF 2011 premiered in Beijing at Pace Gallery, commissioned by Diane von Fürstenberg for her exhibition Journey of a Dress. Instead of painting or photographing von Fürstenberg for her portrait, she created a video with music by composer Ennio Morricone, as a moving 3D portrait depicting her subject as an iconic figure from whose mouth other icons spring.

As a Chinese social media ambassador, Yi Zhou also developed a series of online portraits of key international players from the movie, fashion and art worlds, posted on Tudou.com and Weibo.com. The project introduced the celebrities to Chinese Twitter users, and showcased Zhou's approach to her work as a multimedia artist through portraits created for social media only. In September 2011, Zhou created a short film featuring herself and Nicola Formichetti, showing the work of emerging Chinese fashion designers.

In 2013, she worked with the French couture jewelry house Gripoix, designing their first artist collection, Pineapple's Secret. In the same year, her animations inspired a clothing collection by the hip French brand Each x Other, and she was hired by Iceberg to do a 360-degree clothing capsule collection. Also in 2013, she collaborated with singer Bryan Ferry for an animated work that premiered at her solo exhibition at the Vladivostok Biennale, which also was shown in 2014-2015 as part of a solo exhibition at Le Cube in Paris.

Taking a break from art to devote herself to entrepreneurial and entertainment projects, her next and most recent solo exhibition was in November 2016 at Macro Museum in Rome. In 2019, Yi Zhou launched a fashion and lifestyle brand, Global Intuition. Since late 2021, Zhou has focused on NFT creations and her feature film debut.

In 2024, Yi Zhou released her first documentary feature, In Between Stars and Scars: Masters of Cinema. The film features writer-director Cameron Crowe, cinematographers Robert Richardson and Vittorio Storaro, and production designer Dante Ferretti.

In 2024 her Los Angeles-based Into the Sun Entertainment entered into a film production and restoration joint venture with Italy's Augustus Group, called Colors of the Sun Ventures. Yi Zhou was represented by Mayhem Entertainment of Los Angeles as of 2018.

== Philanthropy ==
Zhou has also actively participated in philanthropic works such as: UN World Climate Change in South Africa UNDP rio+!, Unesco Marine Heritage World and Rush Philanthropics auction in 2015, and most recently, Natalia Vodianova’s Naked Heart Foundation by participating with artwork commissioned by Etam.

In 2022, in collaboration with the United Nations, Zhou has launched a campaign to promote peace.

== Speaking engagements and collaborations ==
Zhou has been selected by the Sundance Film Festival on three consecutive occasions.

She has also given public speeches at TEDx Paris Salon, Tedx 798 and LVMH labour day and Financial Times Luxury Talks.
