= Lindsay Pulsipher =

American actress

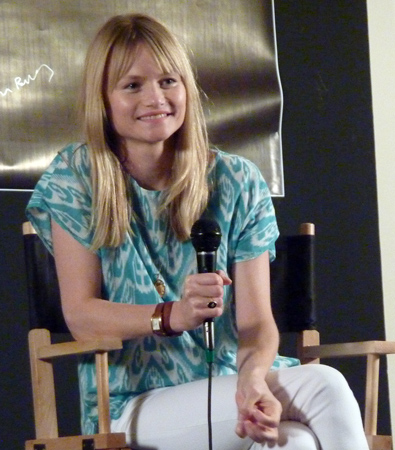
- Pulsipher in 2012
- Occupation: Actress
- Years active: 2000–present

Lindsay Pulsipher is an American actress. She has had several roles in film and television and is known for her series regular role as Rose Lawrence on A&E Network's The Beast (2009). She joined the third season of HBO's True Blood (2010), playing were-panther Crystal Norris and love interest to Jason Stackhouse. She has a recurring role as Detective Amanda Rollins’ troubled sister, Kim, on NBC's Law & Order: Special Victims Unit.

== Early life and influences ==
Pulsipher grew up in Salt Lake City, Utah, with five siblings, and was inspired to be an actor by her mother, a theater actress. As she puts it: "I used to make either my little sister or my best friend act out these plays with me. I was doing that from the time I can remember. It was always something I enjoyed doing." She was influenced by Julie Christie and Audrey Hepburn, who showed her "a whole new world as far as acting goes". Her parents were members of the Church of Jesus Christ of Latter-day Saints, but she has since stopped practicing the religion.

== Career ==
After appearing in several roles from 2000 to 2003 in the television series, Touched by an Angel, filmed in her hometown of Salt Lake City, and after starring in a couple of indie films, Pulsipher moved to Los Angeles to pursue a lifelong dream of a career in acting.

She was given several guest starring roles in popular television series including House, M.D., CSI: NY (Crime Scene Investigation: New York) and NCIS: Naval Criminal Investigative Service, and eventually received a regular role with Patrick Swayze in The Beast (2009). She took the role of Crystal Norris beginning with the third season of the True Blood (2010). She has starred in two features directed by Calvin Reeder: The Oregonian (2011), and The Rambler (2013). She guest-starred as Kim Rollins, Amanda Rollins' troubled sister on Law & Order: Special Victims Unit.

Pulsipher was confirmed as the replacement for Hilary Duff as Bonnie Parker in the remake of The Bonnie and Clyde Story, but she was later replaced with English actress Holliday Grainger.

== Quotes ==
I'm a very visual person. When I'm reading a script or if I'm preparing for a scene I really like to create the story in a visual sense. I take myself out of the character completely and almost watch the character as a spectator, if that makes sense. I'm observing the character as a third person. So I don't make it too personal so that she's her own person. I read it like I do a novel. When you read a book you create this image in your head of what these people are doing and the story in your head is more of a visual thing. I guess that I do that with scripts, too. I almost look at it as a spectator as opposed to being right in it. I know that sounds cheesy but then I feel like I can then learn from watching it if that makes sense.

== Filmography ==
=== Film ===
Year	Title	Role	Notes
2002	Jumping for Joy	Bobbie Dean	
2003	Summer Solstice	Micki	
2005	Piledriver	Michelle	Short film
2006	Little Farm	Lisa	Short film
2006	June and July	Nora	
2009	The Snake Mountain Colada	Mother Desert	Short film
2010	Do Not Disturb	Brenda	
2011	The Oregonian	The Oregonian	
2013	The Rambler	The Girl	
2013	Meth Head	Judith	
2013	How to Speak Clearly	Honey Baker	Short film
2014	Flutter	JoLynn	
2016	Officer Downe	Tiger	
2017	Last Requests	Nancy	Short film
2018	God Bless the Broken Road	Amber Hill	
2018	The Sleepover	Caroline	Short film
2019	Iron and Dirt	Her	Short film
2020	Once Upon a River	Luanne	

=== Television ===
Year	Title	Role	Notes
2000	Touched by an Angel	Young Ellen / Young Lucy	Episodes: "Buy Me a Rose", "The Grudge"
2001	Cover Me	Alison Denny	Episode: "The River"
2001	Touched by an Angel	Raver	Episode: "Heaven's Portal"
2003	Touched by an Angel	Heather	Episode: "Song for My Father"
2005	House	Team Member #1	Episode: "Kids"
2006	Masters of Horror	Tara	Episode: "Fair-Haired Child"
2007	CSI: NY	Cheryl Miller / Venus	Episode: "Down the Rabbit Hole"
2008	Eleventh Hour	Kelly Frost	Episode: "Resurrection"
2009	The Beast	Rose Lawrence	Main role, 13 episodes
2009	NCIS	Tina Ellis	Episode: "Faith"
2010	FlashForward	Adult Charlie Benford	Episode: "Future Shock"
2010	CSI: Crime Scene Investigation	Sally Rand	Episode: "Shock Waves"
2010	Chase	Melanie Robbins	Episode: "Havoc"
2010–2011	True Blood	Crystal Norris	Recurring role, 14 episodes
2011	CSI: Miami	Tara Warner	Episode: "Wheels Up"
2012	Hatfields & McCoys	Roseanna McCoy	Miniseries
2012–2020	Law & Order: Special Victims Unit	Kim Rollins	Recurring role, 5 episodes
2013	Justified	Cassie St. Cyr	Recurring role, 7 episodes
2013	Perception	Kendra Murphy	Episodes: "Wounded", "Warrior"
2015	Criminal Minds	Estelle Cosgrove	Episode: "Anonymous"
2016	American Horror Story: Hotel	Tina Black	Episode: "Battle Royale"
2016–2017	The Night Shift	Rene	3 episodes
2017	Scorpion	Michelle Bannister	Episode: "Something Burrowed, Something Blew"
2017	Fear the Walking Dead	Charlene Daley	2 episodes
2018	Shooter	June Swagger	2 episodes
2022	S.W.A.T.	Odette	Episode: Maniak
2024	Sugar		Upcoming series
