= The Guatemalan Handshake =

- Directed by: Todd Rohal
- Written by: Todd Rohal
- Produced by: Megan Griffiths; Jason Orfanon; Todd Rohal; Marissa Ronca
- Cinematography: Richie Sherman
- Edited by: Alan Canant
- Music by: David Wingo
- Production companies: Amalgamated Filmworks LLC; Brainbox Productions Inc.; Little Fat Girl Productions
- Release date: 2006
- Running time: 96 minutes
- Country: United States
- Language: English

The Guatemalan Handshake is a 2006 comedy-drama film, written and directed by Todd Rohal. It is Rohal's feature film debut. The film premiered at the 2006 Slamdance Film Festival and won the Special Jury Prize.

== Story ==
In the confusion following a massive power outage, an awkward demolition derby driver vanishes, setting in motion a series of events affecting his pregnant girlfriend, his helplessly car-less father, a pack of wild boy scouts, a lactose intolerant roller rink employee, an elderly woman in search of her lost dog, and his best friend—a ten-year-old girl named Turkeylegs.

Pieces of the mystery begin to come together as Turkeylegs sets out to find her missing friend. Cars drive circles in the dirt, a woman attends her own funeral, the sun rises sideways and an orange vehicle trades hands again and again. Everything eventually culminates in a massive demolition derby that throws all of the characters into different directions.

== Main cast ==
- Katy Haywood – Turkeylegs
- Ken Byrnes – Mr. Turnupseed
- Will Oldham – Donald Turnupseed
- Sheila Scullin – Sadie
- Rich Schreiber – Stool
- Kathleen Kennedy – Ethel Firecracker
- Cory McAbee – Spank Williams

== Accolades ==
In 2006, Rohal was named one of Filmmaker's 25 New Faces of Independent Film on the strength of The Guatemalan Handshake, his debut feature, which had won Best Film at Slamdance earlier that year.

The film won three prizes at the 2006 Torino Film Festival, including Best Director for Rohal. It shared the festival's Jury Special Prize with Honor of the Knights and the 2006 Holden award with Honor of the Knights and Zapiski putevogo obkhodchika.

- 2006 in film
