= Off the Grid: Life on the Mesa =

2007 documentary film

Off the Grid: Life on the Mesa is a 2007 documentary written and directed by Jeremy Stulberg and Randy Stulberg. The film documents a loose-knit desert community in "the Mesa", five miles from the Rio Grande and 25 miles from the nearest town. The film was a 2007 entrant into the Slamdance Film Festival for Documentary Competition Features, and it has aired on The Sundance Channel. It won the "Best of the Southwest" award at the 2007 Santa Fe Film Festival.

== Synopsis ==
The film examines a number of residents and their lives in the Mesa. One resident builds a home after his previous house burnt down during a government raid for marijuana. An alcoholic Gulf War veteran loses custody of his four children to his estranged wife in Connecticut. Another veteran struggles with cancer and chooses to remain in the Mesa rather than accept treatment. An elderly pig farmer takes in a teenage runaway, who leaves the community and later returns pregnant. A group of young vegans whom the residents call the Nowhere Kids begin robbing the homes of other residents. The community pulls together to resolve the situation peacefully, and the Nowhere Kids are allowed to remain in the Mesa. Later, they leave the Mesa on their own.

== Reception ==
Roger Moore of the Orlando Sentinel described the film as a "revealing and engaging documentary" about a "fascinating subculture". Michael Esposito of the Chicago Tribune noted the "broad range of people and ideas" covered in the film's relatively brief running time.
