= Nature Calls =

- theatrical release poster
- Directed by: Todd Rohal
- Written by: Todd Rohal
- Starring: Patton Oswalt; Johnny Knoxville; Rob Riggle; Patrice O'Neal
- Cinematography: Steve Gainer
- Edited by: Alan Canant; Nat Sanders
- Music by: Ryan Miller; Joseph Stephens
- Production companies: Troop 41 Productions; Muskat Filmed Properties
- Distributed by: Magnet Releasing
- Release date: November 9, 2012
- Running time: 79 minutes
- Country: United States
- Language: English
- Box office: $7.7 million

Nature Calls is a 2012 American comedy film, released on November 9, 2012, and the DVD version on January 22, 2013. It stars Patton Oswalt, Johnny Knoxville, Rob Riggle, and Patrice O'Neal and features Maura Tierney.

The film is the final on-screen performance of Patrice O'Neal, who died in 2011 from complications of a massive stroke.

== Plot ==
A group of children were gathered together and taken to forests for Boy Scouting in the U.S. Their parents were concerned initially but became grateful.

== Cast ==
- Patton Oswalt as Randy Stevens
- Johnny Knoxville as Kirk Stevens
- Rob Riggle as Gentry
- Maura Tierney as Janine
- Patrice O'Neal as Mr. Caldwell
- Darrell Hammond as Ranger Deakins
- Peter McRobbie as Priest
- Eddie Rouse as Little Eddie
- Regan Mizrahi as Kent
- Ivan Dimitrov as Ivan
- Joshua Ormond as Leonard
- Joseph Paul Kennedy as Gary

== Awards and honors ==
Year	Award	Category	Recipient	Result	Ref.
2013	Young Artist Award	Best Performance in a Feature Film - Supporting Young Actor Ten and Under	Joseph Paul Kennedy	Nominated	
