= The Catechism Cataclysm =

- Directed by: Todd Rohal
- Written by: Todd Rohal
- Produced by: David Gordon Green; Danny McBride; Jody Hill
- Starring: Steve Little; Robert Longstreet; Rico A. Comic; Koko Lanham; Miki Ann Maddox; Wally Dalton
- Cinematography: Benjamin Kasulke
- Edited by: Alan Canant
- Music by: Joseph Stephens
- Production company: Rough House Pictures
- Distributed by: IFC Films
- Release date: January 22, 2011 (Sundance Film Festival)
- Running time: 75 minutes
- Country: United States
- Language: English

The Catechism Cataclysm is a 2011 independent, psychotronic dark comedy film directed by Todd Rohal. The film's narrative concerns a bumbling priest named Father Billy who embarks on a camping trip with his childhood idol, Robbie.

== Cast ==
- Steve Little as Father Billy Smoortser
- Robert Longstreet as Robbie Shoemaker
- Koko Lanham as Huckleberry Finn
- Miki Ann Maddox as Tom Sawyer
- Rico A. Comic as Jim
- Wally Dalton as Father O'Herlihy
- Joe Ivy as Canoe Shop Owner
- Judy Findlay as Old Lady
- Barbara Pomer as Milagros Maria
- Enrique Olguin as Miguel
- Jay Wesley Cochran as Depressed Businessman

== Release ==
The Catechism Cataclysm was produced by Rough House Pictures (David Gordon Green, Danny McBride, and Jody Hill). The film was premiered at the 2011 Sundance Film Festival, and subsequently screened within such festivals as Maryland Film Festival.

It was acquired for distribution by IFC Films.
