= Todd Rohal =

American independent filmmaker

- Born: United States
- Occupations: Film director, screenwriter, actor
- Years active: 1997-present
- Notable work: ABCs of Death 2 Fuck My Son!

Todd Rohal is an American independent filmmaker.

== Career ==
Rohal attended filmmaking classes at Ohio University in Athens, Ohio.

Between 1997 and 2001 he directed four short films: Single Spaced (1997), Slug 660 (1998), Knuckleface Jones (1999), and Hillbilly Robot (2001). Single Spaced and Knuckleface Jones both feature actress Piper Perabo, a college friend of Rohal.

His feature films include 2006's The Guatemalan Handshake, 2011's The Catechism Cataclysm, and 2014's ABCs of Death 2.

He won the Jury Special Award for Best Film for The Guatemalan Handshake at the Slamdance Film Festival in 2006.

Rohal received the Special Jury Award for Unique Vision at the 2014 Sundance Film Festival for his short film Rat Pack Rat.

M.O.P.Z. was broadcast by Adult Swim on April 4, 2016.

The Suplex Duplex Complex was awarded Best Midnight Short at the 2017 SXSW Film Festival.

Hunky Boys Go Ding-Dong was a special pilot filled with two episode specials that Rohal produced.

== Filmography (as director) ==
- Single Spaced (1997)
- Slug 660 (1998)
- Knuckleface Jones (1999)
- Hillbilly Robot (2001)
- The Guatemalan Handshake (2006)
- The Catechism Cataclysm (2011)
- Nature Calls (2012)
- ABCs of Death 2 (2014)
- Rat Pack Rat (2014)
- Uncle Kent 2 (2015)
- M.O.P.Z. (2016)
- The Suplex Duplex Complex (2017)
- Hunky Boys Go Ding-Dong (2018)
- Your Pretty Face Is Going to Hell (2019)
- Bad Manners (2020)
- Fuck My Son! (2025)

== Filmography (as actor) ==
- Hallelujah! Gorilla Revival (2008)
- Hannah Takes the Stairs (2007)
- Mrs. Palfrey at the Claremont (2005)
- Fifth City (2003)
- Lethal Force (2001)
- Scalps (1983)
