= David Gordon Green's unrealized projects =

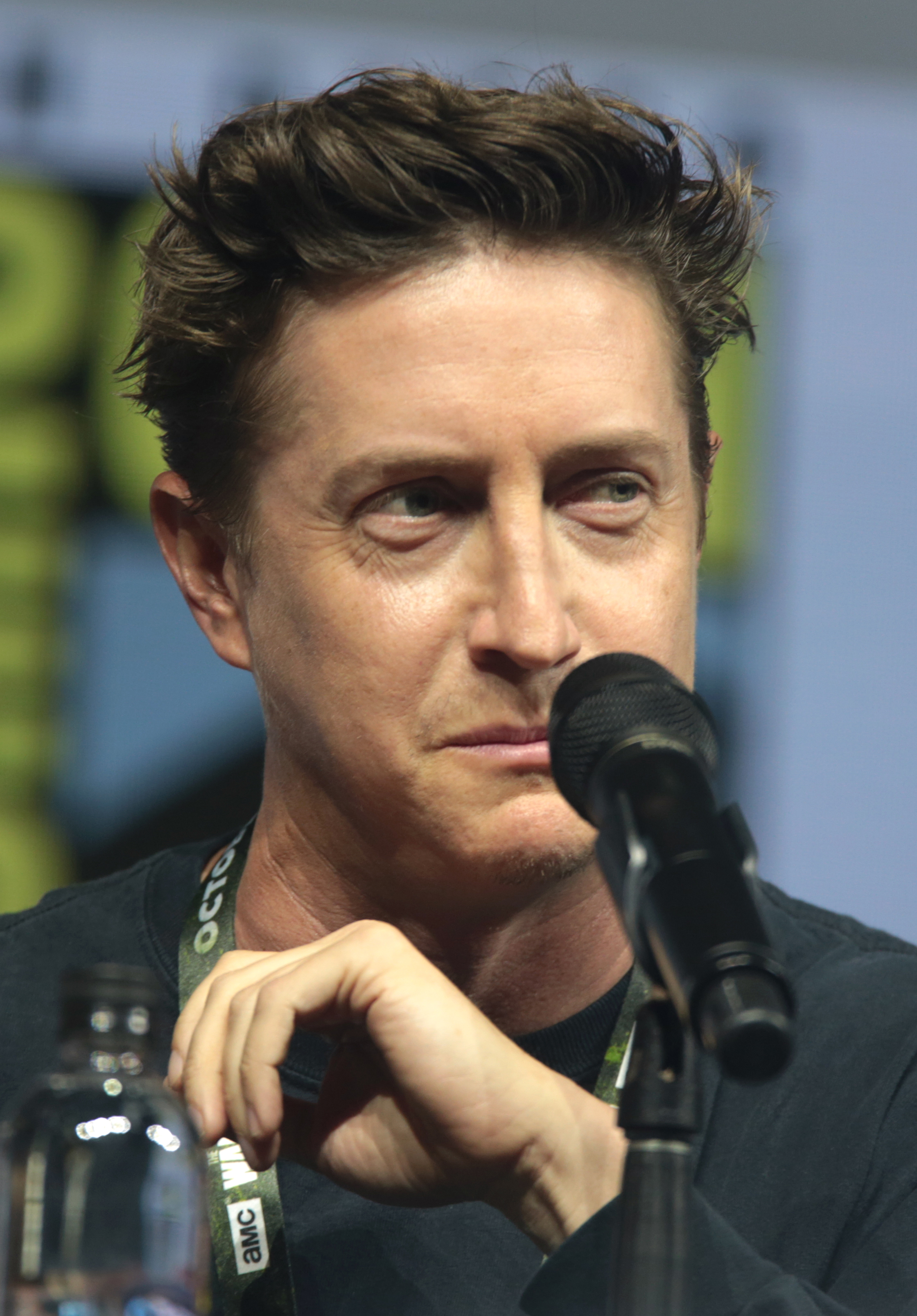
Green at the 2018 San Diego Comic-Con

During his long career, American film director David Gordon Green has worked on a number of projects which never progressed beyond the pre-production stage under his direction. Some of these productions fell in development hell or were cancelled.

== 2000s ==
=== Untitled sci-fi film ===
In September 2001, Green told The Guardian that one of his future projects was a three-hour long sci-fi epic in the vein of [Andrei] Tarkovsky. The project was apparently a starring vehicle for Paul Rudd at one point. In a 2011 interview, when asked about the project, Green said "That's the best script I've ever read. My buddy George Smith, who's one of the writers on my cartoon series Good Vibes, wrote it. I'd want to direct it or support it or produce it."

=== Untitled Western film ===
Another early project Green discussed was a "Gothic, southern epic" script about heroin addicts in the Wild West. If made, Green said he planned to relocate a West Virginia landscape on a British sound stage. Later, in 2011, Green said, "Nobody will finance that shit. I've been trying to get that made for ten years."

=== A Confederacy of Dunces ===
In November 2002, it was announced that Green was to helm a film adaptation of John Kennedy Toole's A Confederacy of Dunces for Miramax Films, which bought the film rights to the novel from Paramount Pictures in June that same year. Will Ferrell was to have portrayed Ignatius J. Reilly and Lily Tomlin, Drew Barrymore, Mos Def and Olympia Dukakis were to have co-starred. The script was written by Steven Soderbergh and Scott Kramer. It was reported in 2003 that Barrymore's production company Flower Films was to co-produce the film with Warner Bros. Principal photography was planned to occur in New Orleans in 2004. The film never came to fruition. It has been said that Hurricane Katrina played a factor in the film's cancellation.

=== The Secret Life of Bees ===
In March 2003, it was reported that Green was planning to direct a film adaptation of Sue Monk Kidd's novel The Secret Life of Bees. Then, in 2004, it was announced that Green will write and direct the film for Focus Features, with Lauren Shuler Donner serving as producer. A film was eventually released in 2008 without Green's involvement.

=== Fat Albert ===
Green admitted in a July 11, 2003 interview with MTV News that he wanted to direct a live action film adaptation of Bill Cosby's Fat Albert and the Cosby Kids. Green stated, "I’ve had two goals as far as movies are concerned forever that I can remember. One of them was to [make] Dunces, and [then] more than anything in the whole world, I really wanna do Fat Albert. I got really depressed because they were about to go into production on Fat Albert a year ago with Forest Whitaker directing, so I was super pissed." After Whitaker dropped out of Fat Albert, Green campaigned to direct the film. Green was unsuccessful. The film was instead directed by Joel Zwick and released in 2004.

=== The Precious Few ===
It was reported on July 25, 2003, that Green was working on a script of a film titled The Precious Few. Green co-wrote the script with Danny McBride. It has been said that the film is about demolition derbies. The Independent reported that had the film been greenlighted, Green was to have cast Paul Schneider as "a gay mechanic named Tess." Green said of the project in 2011, "I would love to [make it]. We’ve been around for a couple years trying to get it financed. Yeah that would be our flagship film if we can find a great international financier. I wrote it with my buddy when I was all drugged up on painkillers after having jaw surgery and somehow, in six days, we cranked out something we were really proud of.”

=== Shockproof Sydney Skate ===
It was reported in 2004 that Sydney Pollack hired Green to write a film adaptation of Marijane Meaker's Shockproof Sydney Skate. Pollack was going to direct the film, but his death in 2008 caused it to be shelved.

=== Lord Vishnu's Love Handles ===
Variety reported in July 2004 that Green was attached to direct a film adaptation of Will Clarke's Lord Vishnu's Love Handles: A Spy Novel (sort of) with Grant Morris writing. The film was to have been distributed by Paramount, but it never came to fruition. Green said of the project in 2011, "It got turned around. I think that kind of disappeared."

=== Untitled Bubba Stewart biopic ===
In 2005, Green attempted to make an untitled biopic about the life of James Stewart Jr.

=== Nerd Camp ===
Green stated in a 2005 interview with IndieWire that he was writing a script of a film titled Nerd Camp and that Seann William Scott was to star in it. Green later said in a 2006 interview that the film was "about a summer camp for geniuses." The film was to have been distributed by Universal Pictures. When asked about the fate of Nerd Camp in 2011, Green responded, "They took it away from me and Danny [McBride] before anybody knew who we were and had some other guy write it."

=== Mr. Machine ===
In 2006, Green sold a project called Mr. Machine to Universal Pictures and Imagine Entertainment. It was reported as being a throwback to the high-concept family comedies of the 1980s. Green co-wrote the script with Danny McBride, who also would have starred. In 2008, McBride told CHUD.com, "It's our take on those old Amblin films – it follows around these science fair geeks that construct this robot that gets a life of its own. It's like... I don't know, a Short Circuit zombie movie."

=== The Innocent Man ===
It was announced in March 2007 that Green was to write and direct The Innocent Man for Warner Independent Pictures and Smoke House Pictures. The film was to have been based on John Grisham's non-fiction book about Ron Williamson titled The Innocent Man: Murder and Injustice in a Small Town. According to Green, the film was shelved due to "legal problems."

=== Suspiria remake ===
In May 2007, there was talk that Green was one of the directors being considered to helm a remake of the 1977 horror classic Suspiria. Green reportedly co-wrote the script with Chris Gebert. In 2009, Empire reported that Green would shoot the film in 2010. In April 2012, it was announced that Crime Scene Pictures would produce the film. It was also reported that principal photography was to begin in September 2012. Isabelle Fuhrman was slated to play the lead in Green's remake. In addition to Fuhrman, Isabelle Huppert, Janet McTeer, Michael Nyqvist and Antje Traue were also to have appeared in the film. Green reported in 2013 that the film was in development hell due to legal issues. In 2015, it was confirmed that Green will not direct the film. Instead, Luca Guadagnino replaced Green and the film was released in 2018.

=== One in the Chamber ===
Green announced in March 2008 that he and Darius Shahmir wrote a script titled One in the Chamber; intended to kickstart a franchise of cheap, direct-to-video genre films. According to Green, the script is about "a guy going to get his kidnapped son out of prison." Green later stated in 2011 that he did not want to direct the film. Variety reported in 2017 that Oceanside Media will produce the film and that Shahmir would direct it. Variety further described it as about "an ex-Marine who finds himself deep in the jungles of Asia searching for his son who has been taken hostage by the most dangerous man in Cambodia."

=== Six Pack remake ===
In July 2008, Green told FirstShowing.net that he was working on a remake of the 1982 film Six Pack for 20th Century Fox. It was a family movie about a bunch of crazy kids that "run the show" during NASCAR races. It was reported in 2010 that Green had co-written the project, initially titled Burnin' Rubber, as an original screenplay with Barlow Jacobs, until Fox requested that it be retooled into a Six Pack remake. Attached to direct the film at the time was Tom Dey, with Kevin James given the offer to star. However, it was later reported in 2012 that Green would write and direct the film at Fox. It was never made.

=== Ice Station Zebra remake ===
FirstShowing.net also reported in July 2008 that Green mentioned writing an "Arctic warfare movie", but disclosed no further details. In August, The New York Times described this project as a "submarine adventure". It was later revealed in 2011 to be a remake of the 1968 film Ice Station Zebra, which he wrote for Warner Bros. Green traveled to the Arctic circle to conduct research with the Navy, observing "the lingo and the politics of what's going on in the arctic right now".

=== Obstruction of Justice ===
One in the Chamber was the first in a planned series of Green-produced action movies co-written with Darius Shahmir, followed by one called Obstruction of Justice which the two had also completed a script of. Green planned to release the film under a direct-to-video label specialized in low-budget productions, though it was unclear if he were to direct as well.

=== Chain of Command ===
Chain of Command was a third project that Green and Darius Shahmir were finishing writing as of August 2008. This too was apart of the proposed franchise consisting of what Green described as "cheap action movie hero kind of stuff".

=== Bite the Bullet ===
At the same time as Chain of Command, Green and writing partner Darius Shahmir were working on an action screenplay for Bite the Bullet. As with the others, Green envisioned using stuntmen instead of professional actors in order to shoot real, choreographed fight scenes, expressing his tiredness with the modern conventions of the genre "because you don't ever see where the punches are, because it's all sound design and switching cameras," he explained. "I don't care if they're good actors, I just want people who can really fight in a movie, just get a bunch of stuntmen to act in it, it'd be great." It is not known whether Green was intending on directing Bite the Bullet.

=== Freaks of the Heartland ===
It was announced in October 2008 that Green was to direct a film adaptation of Steve Niles' Dark Horse graphic novel Freaks of the Heartland for Overture Films with Peter Sattler and Geoff Davey writing. Green reported in 2011 that the film might be animated. It was reported in 2016 that Green, if available, was attached to produce and direct a television series based on Freaks of the Heartland for MTV.

== 2010s ==
=== Battling Boy ===
In May 2010, it was announced that Paramount Pictures hired Green and Josh Parkinson to rewrite the Battling Boy script. The project was to have been based on Paul Pope's graphic novel of the same name. On July 29, 2015, The Tracking Board reported that Patrick Osborne replaced Green as director of Battling Boy, while Green co-wrote the screenplay with Josh Parkinson.

=== Free Country ===
It was also announced in May 2010 that Green was eyeing to direct Parkinson's first original screenplay titled Free Country. The story was described as "a thriller with comedic elements."

=== Barefoot Bandit ===
It was reported in July 2010 that Green was to produce and direct Barefoot Bandit for 20th Century Fox. It was to have based on Taking Flight: The Hunt for a Young Outlaw, a nonfiction book by Bob Friel about the life of Colton Harris Moore. The script was written by Dustin Lance Black. In 2012, it was announced that Green dropped out of the project.

=== Untitled musical film ===
In April 2011, Green revealed a dream project of his about rival musical families in Branson, Missouri in the 1960s, adding that "If someone called me up and asked if I wanted to do Seven Brides for Seven Brothers I'd jump to the front of the line for that."

=== Q ===
In November 2011, it was announced that Green would write and direct a film adaptation of Evan Mandery's Q for Columbia Pictures. The film was to have been produced by Matt Tolmach and Pouya Shahbazian. In August 2015, the project was moved to Lionsgate Films without Green's involvement.

=== Little House on the Prairie ===
It was reported in 2012 that Green was in talks to direct a film based on Laura Ingalls Wilder's Little House on the Prairie for Sony Pictures. Abi Morgan was to have written the script. Scott Rudin was to serve as producer. Green left the project in 2014 when it was announced that Sean Durkin will direct the film.

=== Hit the Road Jack ===
In a June 2013 interview with the Special Broadcasting Service, Green expressed interest in remaking his film Prince Avalanche in Australia as an action movie and title it Hit the Road Jack. It would also have been the second remake of the 2011 Icelandic film Either Way.

=== Untitled Richard Pryor biopic ===
In August 2013, upon calling Richard Pryor his "favorite actor of all time", Green posed his interest in the idea of making a film "just about Richard Pryor when he was shooting David Lynch's Lost Highway." That role saw an MS-diagnosed Pryor in a brief scene, playing a wheelchair-bound auto shop boss.

=== Untitled horror film ===
Also in August 2013, after financing fell apart for his Suspiria remake, Green was considering helming a horror film from a script written by Craig Zobel.

=== The Line ===
In January 2014, it was announced that Green was going to direct Chris Pine in a thriller film titled The Line. According to Variety, the film is about "a border patrol agent who, after recently losing his wife and child, goes on the run with a boy whose family was recently killed by the cartel. He soon finds out both sides of the law have their sights on him and the boy." The script was written by Sang Kyu Kim.

=== Score TV series ===
In May 2014, Green was attached to direct the television series Score, a college football drama set in the 1980s. The project was written by Don Johnson, who also would have starred. While at TIFF 2024, Green teased the possibility of getting back to work on Score with Johnson.

=== Top Gun: Maverick ===
When Tom Cruise's involvement in Top Gun: Maverick was first announced, Green asked his agent to get him a meeting about directing it. "When the title for Top Gun: Maverick was circulating, I raised my hand loud to my agent and I said, 'just get me the meeting,'" he said. "But that meeting did not happen. I did not get the meeting." The job ultimately went to Joseph Kosinski, and the film opened in 2022.

=== Newsflash ===
In 2017, it was announced that Green was to direct Seth Rogen in Newsflash with Ben Jacoby writing. The film is a dramatization of Walter Cronkite's news coverage of the assassination of President John F. Kennedy. Cronkite was to have been portrayed by Rogen. Green left the project in favor of directing Halloween Kills instead.

=== Friday Night Lights ===
In 2018, it was announced that Green was in talks of directing a reboot of Friday Night Lights based on Buzz Bissinger's Friday Night Lights: A Town, a Team, and a Dream with Robert Schenkkan writing. Green backed out of the project in 2019 due to scheduling conflicts.

=== Untitled Christopher Wylie biopic ===
In July 2019, Green was in talks to direct a film about Cambridge Analytica mastermind Christopher Wylie from screenwriting team Christopher Markus and Stephen McFeely. On March 16, 2020, Paul Bettany signed on to star. The film, which had the Russo brothers and Mike Larocca attached as producers, was slated to begin production after Green finished shooting Halloween Kills, with Matt Shakman and Peter Farrelly attached to direct the movie instead of Green.

=== Hogan's Heroes sequel series ===
In September 2019, it was reported that Green's company Rough House, Village Roadshow Pictures and Albert S. Ruddy would produce a sequel series to Hogan's Heroes about the descendants of the original characters teaming up for a treasure hunt.

== 2020s ==
=== Hellraiser TV series ===
In April 2020, HBO was announced to be developing a Hellraiser television series that would serve as "an elevated continuation and expansion" of its mythology with Mark Verheiden and Michael Dougherty writing the series and Green directing several episodes.

=== Smokey and the Bandit TV series ===
In October 2020, a Smokey and the Bandit TV series remake was revealed to be in development, with a pilot written by Green and Brian Sides and also executive produced with his Rough House confederates Jody Hill, Danny McBride and Brandon James and Seth MacFarlane and Erica Huggins of Fuzzy Door.

=== Garbage Pail Kids TV series ===
In May 2021, an animated series based on the Garbage Pail Kids was announced as being in development at HBO Max with Green, Danny McBride and Josh Bycel on board as writers/co-creators. As of October 2023, the series was still in development.

=== The Exorcist: Believer sequels ===
In July 2021, when a trilogy of new Exorcist films was announced, two sequels were confirmed to be concurrently in development at Blumhouse. Green was slated to serve as director on The Exorcist: Believer, while work on the scripts with the same writing team of himself, Danny McBride, Peter Sattler and Scott Teems for the two additional films was ongoing. The first of these sequels, titled The Exorcist: Deceiver, was slated to be released in theaters on April 18, 2025. Following the poor reception of Believer, sources from The Hollywood Reporter claimed there would almost certainly be some degree of creative re-think for the next two films, and that Green recently expressed some doubt about his participation. In January 2024, Green officially stepped down from Deceiver, and the film was removed from the release schedule shortly after. In September 2024, Green detailed that his vision for both films was "ambitious", included "some pretty extraordinary backdrops" in Europe, and would have followed Ann Dowd's character.

=== Untitled Star Wars film ===
According to journalist Jeff Sneider, Green was supposedly trying to get a Star Wars film off the ground before the release of Halloween Kills, which was received poorly by critics and audiences alike. Sneider speculated that the film was a non-starter after the negative reception of both Kills and Halloween Ends. When later asked if the rumors were true, Green confirmed that he had meetings about potentially directing a Star Wars film, but conceded, "The mechanism, I think, might look at me too skeptically. Like anything, there's executives that want to know who's out there and what they're thinking. [...] But my impulses are always pretty eccentric." Accordingly, he once pitched a film to a studio by describing it as "Krull meets Barry Lyndon, with a little bit of Cabin Boy in it."

=== Untitled Disneyland film ===
It was revealed in October 2021 that Green was to helm a film at Disney Studios for Disney+ from a script by Evan Spiliotopoulos about Walt Disney's journey to building Disneyland. "It's about the brotherhood of Walt and Roy Disney," Green said, "But it's basically the creation, the destruction of Disneyland." According to Green, the project, which was still in the scripting stage, was to focus more on the creation of the park as opposed to how it changed and developed over the decades. In 2023, he told io9 that the project was "on pause right now", owing to rights issues.

=== Untitled documentary film ===
In a November 2024 interview for Deadline Hollywood, Green stated that he was in the process of developing an as-yet revealed documentary film, in addition to a comedic script and an action film.

=== All Night Long ===
In a February 2025 issue of Production Weekly, Green was attached to direct All Night Long, written by Peter Chiarelli, for Calvary Media and Richlion Productions. It was listed as "in development". The project was a Lionel Richie musical biopic, titled after the song of the same name, first announced by Walt Disney Studios in 2020.
