= Rough House Pictures =

American television and film production company

- Type: Private
- Industry: Production company
- Founded: December 2009; 16 years ago in Los Angeles, California, U.S.
- Founder: Danny McBride; David Gordon Green; Jody Hill
- Headquarters: Charleston, South Carolina, U.S.
- Website: www.roughhousepictures.com

Rough House Pictures is an American television and film production company founded by Danny McBride, David Gordon Green, and Jody Hill in 2009.

It is known for producing the television series Eastbound & Down, Vice Principals, The Righteous Gemstones, and Telemarketers, and producing the films The Sitter (2011), Arizona (2018), Halloween (2018), Halloween Kills (2021), and Halloween Ends (2022).

== History ==
In December 2009, the company was founded by American actor, comedian, screenwriter and producer Danny McBride, filmmaker David Gordon Green, and actor and filmmaker Jody Hill in Los Angeles, California. In the inception of the company, it entered a two-year first-look deal with Mandate Pictures, and Matt Reilly joined as head of production.

In August 2011, the company entered a one-year television production deal at 20th Century Fox Television. In 2016, the company entered a two-year overall deal with Home Box Office, Inc.

In July 2017, the company moved its production offices from Hollywood, Los Angeles, California to Charleston, South Carolina where the company's production, The Righteous Gemstones, is set.

== Filmography ==
=== Television ===
Year	Title	Network	Notes	Ref.
2009–2013	Eastbound & Down	HBO	with Gary Sanchez Productions and Enemy MIGs Productions	
2011	Good Vibes	MTV	with Werner Entertainment, Not the QB Pro., 6 Point Harness, Warner Horizon Television, and MTV Production Development	
2014	Chozen	FX	with Floyd County Productions and FX Productions	
2016–2017	Vice Principals	HBO	with HBO Entertainment	
2017	There's... Johnny!	Hulu (Note: There's... Johnny! was ordered by Seeso and originally scheduled to premiere on that streaming service. Following the service's closure, Hulu acquired the rights to stream the series.)	with Nuance Productions and Comedy Dynamics	
2017	Tarantula	TBS	with Rough Draft Studios, Solid Brass, and Studio T	
2019–2025	The Righteous Gemstones	HBO	with HBO Entertainment	
2023	Telemarketers	HBO	with Elara Pictures, All Facts, and HBO Documentary Films	
2024–present	Tires	Netflix	with Dad Sick Productions and AGI Entertainment	

=== Film ===
Year	Title	Director	Gross (worldwide)	Notes	Ref.
2011	The Catechism Cataclysm	Todd Rohal	—N/a		
2011	The Sitter	David Gordon Green	$34.9 million	with Michael De Luca Productions and 20th Century Fox	
2012	The Comedy	Rick Alverson	—N/a	with Greyshack Films, Glass Eye Pix, Made Bed Productions, and Jagjaguwar	
2013	Prince Avalanche	David Gordon Green	$442,313	with To Get to the Other Side, Muskat Filmed Properties, Dogfish Pictures, Lankn Partners, DreamBridge Films, and The Bear Media	
2013	Joe	David Gordon Green	$2.4 million	with Worldview Entertainment, DreamBridge Films, and Muskat Filmed Properties	
2014	Camp X-Ray	Peter Sattler	$60,581	with GNK Productions, Gotham Group, and The Young Gang	
2014	Manglehorn	David Gordon Green	$459,636	with Worldview Entertainment	
2015	Hot Sugar's Cold World	Adam Bhala Lough	—N/a		
2016	Fraud	Dean Fleischer Camp	—N/a	with Memory	
2016	Donald Cried	Kristopher Avedisian	$61,406	with Electric Chinoland	
2016	Hunter Gatherer	Josh Locy	—N/a	with Secret Intimacies, Mama Bear Studios, and Unbundled Underground	
2017	Dayveon	Amman Abbasi	—N/a	with Mama Bear Studios, Meridian Entertainment, Muskat Filmed Properties, Salem Street Entertainment, and Symbolic Exchange	
2017	Flower	Max Winkler	$380,553	with Diablo Entertainment	
2017	Gemini	Aaron Katz	$200,340	with Neon, Film Science, Syncopated Films, and Pastel Productions	
2018	The Legacy of a Whitetail Deer Hunter	Jody Hill	—N/a	with Scott Rudin Productions	
2018	Arizona	Jonathan Watson	—N/a	with Imperative Entertainment	
2018	Halloween	David Gordon Green	$259.9 million	with Blumhouse Productions, Trancas International Films, Miramax, and Universal Pictures	
2020	Fatman	Eshom Nelms; Ian Nelms	$1.7 million	with Fortitude International, Mammoth Entertainment, Sprockefeller Pictures, and Ingenious Media	
2021	Halloween Kills	David Gordon Green	$133.4 million	with Blumhouse Productions, Trancas International Films, Miramax, and Universal Pictures	
2022	Halloween Ends	David Gordon Green	$105.4 million	with Blumhouse Productions, Trancas International Films, Miramax, and Universal Pictures	
2023	The Exorcist: Believer	David Gordon Green	$133.8 million	with Blumhouse Productions and Morgan Creek Entertainment	
2024	Nutcrackers	David Gordon Green	—N/a	with Red Hour Productions and Rivulet Films	
2028	Untitled G.I. Joe film	Danny McBride	—N/a	with Hasbro Entertainment and Di Bonaventura Pictures	
