= Lisa Muskat =

American film producer

Lisa Muskat (born in New Hampshire) is an American film producer based in New York and Paris. She is known for her frequent collaborations with David Gordon Green.

Lisa Muskat has produced films by visionary directors, including David Gordon Green, Mei-Juin Chen, Jeff Nichols, Ramin Bahrani, Arielle Javitch, Craig Zobel, Amman Abbasi, Ferdinando Cito Filomarino, Paxton Winters and Luca Guadagnino.

Muskat is a member of the Academy of Motion Pictures Arts and Sciences. She is the recipient of the Sundance Producer Award and was cited as “Producer to Watch” by both Variety and Deadline. Prior to producing, Muskat was a professor at UNC’s North Carolina School of the Arts and holds a masters from UCLA School of Film and TV.

She continues giving lectures and courses - NYU Film School, Columbia University, School of Visual Arts, The New School and the Vermont College of Fine Arts. She is a Golden Shell winner.

== Filmography ==
She was a producer in all films unless otherwise noted.

=== Film ===
Year	Film	Credit	Award
2000	George Washington		
2003	All the Real Girls		
2003	Crude	Executive producer	
2004	Undertow		
2005	Man Push Cart	Executive producer	
2006	Out There		
2007	Snow Angels		
2007	Shotgun Stories		
2007	Chop Shop		
2010	Look, Stranger		
2011	The Sitter	Executive producer	
2012	Compliance		
2012	Nature Calls		
2012	See Girl Run	Executive producer	
2013	Prince Avalanche		
2013	Joe		
2014	Manglehorn		
2015	Booger Red	Executive producer	
2017	Dayveon	Executive producer	
2019	Pacified		Won the Golden Shell
2021	Beckett	Executive producer	
2022	Bones and All	Co-producer	

Thanks

Year	Film	Role
2018	Cabaret Maxime	Thanks
2019	Drita	Special thanks
