= Amman Abbasi =

Pakistani American filmmaker and composer

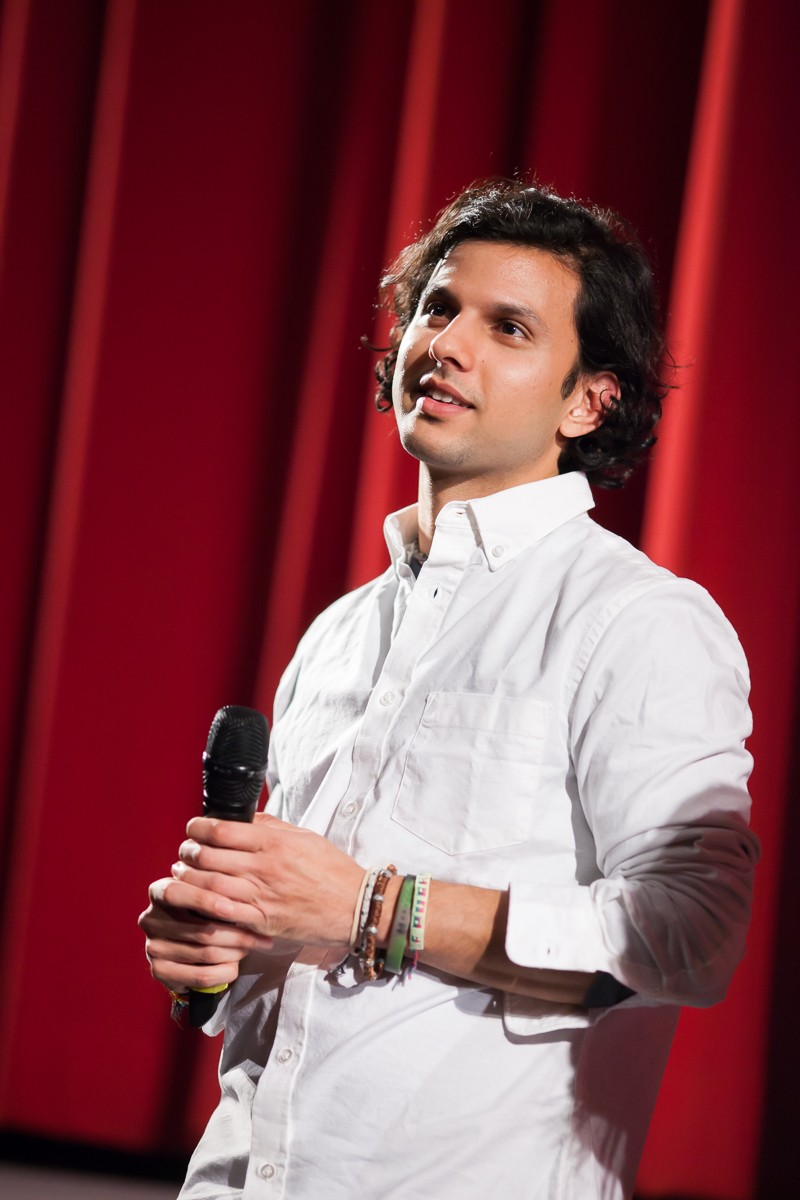
- Occupations: Film director; composer; editor
- Years active: 2009–present
- Relatives: Yousuf Abbasi (brother)

Amman Abbasi is a Pakistani American writer, director, producer, editor and composer. He was named one of Filmmaker magazine’s “25 New Faces of Independent Film” in 2016. His debut feature, Dayveon (2017), premiered at the Sundance and Berlin international film festival and received two Independent Spirit Award nominations.

His later work includes Yasmeen’s Element (2024), the score for The Exorcist: Believer (2023), and co-producing the 2026 Academy Award-nominated documentary short Armed Only with a Camera: The Life and Death of Brent Renaud.

== Early life and education ==
Abbasi grew up in Paragould and Jonesboro before his family moved to Little Rock when he was nine; he attended Hall High School and completed his senior year at Little Rock Central High School. He has cited the Dardenne brothers and Martin Scorsese as principal influences on his filmmaking.

== Career ==
=== Documentary work ===
Abbasi began his career in documentary filmmaking after dropping out of college. While in high school he met the documentarians Brent and Craig Renaud and worked with them as a cameraman on projects including their Chicago gang-violence documentary. In 2011 he travelled to Haiti for The New York Times to cover the aftermath of the 2010 Haiti earthquake; the resulting short documentary received an Alfred I. duPont–Columbia Award. He served as editor on the Renaud Brothers' series Last Chance High (2015), which was nominated for a Primetime Emmy Award for outstanding editing. He also worked as director's assistant to David Gordon Green on Manglehorn (2014) and Our Brand Is Crisis (2015).

In 2021, Abbasi directed Udaan, a short documentary commissioned as part of the Hindsight Project that follows Baneen Khan, a young woman from Karachi who relocates to rural Arkansas to begin studies at Black River Technical College. Udaan premiered at AFI Docs in 2022.

In 2026, Abbasi served as co-producer on Armed Only with a Camera: The Life and Death of Brent Renaud, which was nominated for Best Documentary Short Film at the 2026 Academy Awards.

=== Feature films ===
Abbasi's debut feature, Dayveon, tells the story of a 13-year-old African-American boy in rural Wrightsville, Arkansas who falls in with a local gang following the death of his older brother. The film was developed through the IFP Narrative Lab and was executive-produced by David Gordon Green, James Schamus and Lisa Muskat. Dayveon premiered at the 2017 Sundance Film Festival and was an official selection at the 2017 Berlin International Film Festival; it received two nominations at the 33rd Independent Spirit Awards in 2018.

Abbasi's second feature, Yasmeen's Element (2024), is a 76-minute drama set in the Hunza Valley of Gilgit-Baltistan, Pakistan. It had its world premiere at SXSW in March 2024 in the festival's Narrative Spotlight section, and was subsequently screened at the 48th São Paulo International Film Festival.

== Music ==
Abbasi's first credited score was for the 2009 documentary Warrior Champions: From Baghdad to Beijing. He has scored both his own features, Dayveon and Yasmeen's Element, and his compositions have been used in films including The Wall (2010), Tragedy (2015), Shelter (2016) and Meth Storm (2017). He served as music consultant on the Halloween film franchise, working on Halloween (2018) and Halloween Kills (2021).

In 2023, Abbasi co-composed the score for The Exorcist: Believer with David Wingo; the score received a nomination for Best Original Score in a Horror Film at the 14th Hollywood Music in Media Awards.

== Filmography ==
Year	Title	Director	Composer	Editor	Notes
2009	Warrior Champions: From Baghdad to Beijing		Yes		Documentary
2014	Manglehorn				Director's assistant
2015	Our Brand Is Crisis				Director's assistant
2015	Last Chance High			Yes	Documentary series; Emmy nomination
2017	Dayveon	Yes	Yes	Yes	Two Independent Spirit Award nominations
2018	Halloween				Music consultant
2021	Halloween Kills				Music consultant
2021	Udaan	Yes			Short documentary
2023	The Exorcist: Believer		Yes		Co-composer with David Wingo
2024	Yasmeen's Element	Yes	Yes		Feature

== Awards and nominations ==
Year	Award	Category	Work	Result
2018	33rd Independent Spirit Awards	John Cassavetes Award and Kiehl's Someone to Watch Award	Dayveon	Nominated
2023	14th Hollywood Music in Media Awards	Best Original Score in a Horror Film	The Exorcist: Believer	Nominated
