= David Wingo =

American songwriter and composer

- Genres: Soundtrack
- Occupation: Composer
- Years active: 2000s–present
- Member of: Ola Podrida
- Website: www.david-wingo.com

David Wingo is an American film and television composer. He is known for his collaborations with directors David Gordon Green, Jeff Nichols, and Jeff McIlwain (Lusine).

== Career ==
Wingo began his career writing film scores for his childhood best friend, director David Gordon Green, including George Washington (2000) and All the Real Girls (2003). His score for Take Shelter (2011), was nominated for a Discovery Of The Year Award at the World Soundtrack Awards. As the composer of the HBO dark comedy series Barry (2018–2023), he was nominated for the 2019 Emmy Award for Outstanding Music Composition for a Series (Original Dramatic Score). He has also recorded three albums with his band, Ola Podrida.

== Filmography ==
=== Film ===
Year	Title	Director	Notes
2000	George Washington	David Gordon Green	Co-composed with Michael Linnen
2001	Manic	Jordan Melamed	Co-composed with Michael Linnen
2003	All the Real Girls	David Gordon Green	Co-composed with Michael Linnen
2006	The Guatemalan Handshake	Todd Rohal	
2007	Snow Angels	David Gordon Green	Co-composed with Jeff McIlwain
2007	Great World of Sound	Craig Zobel	
2009	Gentlemen Broncos	Jared Hess	
2010	Gerrymandering	Jeff Reichert	Documentary film
2011	Take Shelter	Jeff Nichols	
2011	The Sitter	David Gordon Green	Co-composed with Jeff McIlwain
2012	Mud	Jeff Nichols	
2013	Prince Avalanche	David Gordon Green	Co-composed with Explosions in the Sky
2013	Joe	David Gordon Green	Co-composed with Jeff McIlwain
2014	Alex of Venice	Chris Messina	
2014	Manglehorn	David Gordon Green	Co-composed with Explosions in the Sky
2015	Maggie	Henry Hobson	
2015	Our Brand Is Crisis	David Gordon Green	
2016	Midnight Special	Jeff Nichols	
2016	Loving	Jeff Nichols	
2017	Brigsby Bear	Dave McCary	
2018	State Like Sleep	Meredith Danluck	Co-composed with Jeff McIlwain
2019	The Report	Scott Z. Burns	
2023	The Exorcist: Believer	David Gordon Green	Co-composed with Amman Abbasi
2023	The Bikeriders	Jeff Nichols	
2024	The A-Frame	Calvin Lee Reeder	
2025	Splitsville	Michael Angelo Covino	Co-composed with Dabney Morris

=== Television ===
Year	Title	Notes
2018–2020	Kidding	
2018–2023	Barry	2019: Emmy nominated for Outstanding Music Composition for a Series
2020	Heaven's Gate: The Cult of Cults	Documentary miniseries
2021–2023	Mayans M.C.	
