= Tim Orr =

American cinematographer (born 1968)

- Born: 1968 (age 57–58); North Carolina, U.S.
- Education: North Carolina School of the Arts
- Years active: 1998–present

Tim Orr (born 1968) is an American cinematographer.

== Filmography ==
=== Film ===
Year	Title	Director
2000	George Washington	David Gordon Green
2002	Raising Victor Vargas	Peter Sollett
2002	EvenHand	Joseph Pierson
2003	All the Real Girls	David Gordon Green
2004	Dandelion	Mark Milgard
2004	Undertow	David Gordon Green
2004	Imaginary Heroes	Dan Harris
2005	The Baxter	Michael Showalter
2005	Trust the Man	Bart Freundlich
2005	Little Manhattan	Mark Levin
2006	Off the Black	James Ponsoldt
2006	Come Early Morning	Joey Lauren Adams
2007	Snow Angels	David Gordon Green
2007	Year of the Dog	Mike White
2008	Choke	Clark Gregg
2008	Pineapple Express	David Gordon Green
2008	Sex Drive	Sean Anders
2009	Observe and Report	Jody Hill
2010	Bloodworth	Shane Dax Taylor
2011	Salvation Boulevard	George Ratliff
2011	Your Highness	David Gordon Green
2011	The Sitter	David Gordon Green
2012	Seeking a Friend for the End of the World	Lorene Scafaria
2012	Stuck in Love	Josh Boone
2013	Prince Avalanche	David Gordon Green
2013	Joe	David Gordon Green
2014	Manglehorn	David Gordon Green
2014	Cymbeline	Michael Almereyda
2014	Search Party	Scot Armstrong
2015	The World Made Straight	David Burris
2015	Z for Zachariah	Craig Zobel
2015	Our Brand Is Crisis	David Gordon Green
2016	Pee-wee's Big Holiday	John Lee
2018	A.X.L.	Oliver Daly
2018	The Professor	Wayne Roberts
2019	Poms	Zara Hayes
2020	Desperados	LP
2023	Strays	Josh Greenbaum
2025	Regretting You	Josh Boone
2026	Let's Have Kids!	Adam Sztykiel

=== Television ===
Year	Title	Director	Notes
2009	Eastbound & Down	David Gordon Green; Jody Hill; Adam McKay	5 episodes
2011	His Way	Douglas McGrath	Documentary film
2012	Local Talent	Douglas McGrath	
2014	Red Oaks	David Gordon Green	Episode "Pilot"
2015	Z: The Beginning of Everything	Tim Blake Nelson	Episode "Pilot"
2021	Dickinson		10 episodes
2022	Fleishman Is in Trouble	Shari Springer Berman; Robert Pulcini	4 episodes
2022-2023	Alaska Daily		6 episodes
2025-2026	The Four Seasons		Season 1 and season 2
2026	Vladimir	Shari Springer Berman; Robert Pulcini; Francesca Gregorini; Josephine Bornebusch	6 episodes

== Awards and nominations ==
Year	Award	Category	Title	Result
2000	Stockholm International Film Festival	Best Cinematography	George Washington	Won
2001	Film Independent Spirit Awards	Best Cinematography	George Washington	Nominated
2004	Film Independent Spirit Awards	Best Cinematography	Dandelion	Nominated
2008	Satellite Awards	Best Cinematography	Snow Angels	Nominated
