= Genre film =

Genre film may refer to:

- A film conforming to a well-defined film genre
- Genre Films, a.k.a. Kinberg Genre, a television and film production company
- Genre (1996 film), a live-action/animated short by Don Hertzfeldt

== See also ==
- Genre (disambiguation), the generic term referring to all forms of art and entertainment
- B movie (disambiguation), a generic film with minimal artistic ambitions
