= Hit the Road Jack (disambiguation) =

"Hit the Road Jack" is a 1960 song popularized by Ray Charles.

Hit the Road Jack or Hit the Road, Jack may also refer to:

- Hit the Road Jack (album), by Big Youth, 1976
- Hit the Road Jack (TV series), a 2012 British comedy series
- "Hit the Road, Jack" (Civil Wars), a 1993 television episode
- "Hit the Road Jack" (Kickin' It), a 2012 television episode
- "Hit the Road, Jack" (Roseanne), a 1997 television episode
- Hit the Road Jack, an unrealized film project proposed by David Gordon Green

== See also ==
- Hit the Road Mack, a stand-up show by Lee Mack
- Hit the Road (disambiguation)
