= David Gordon Green =

American filmmaker (born 1975)

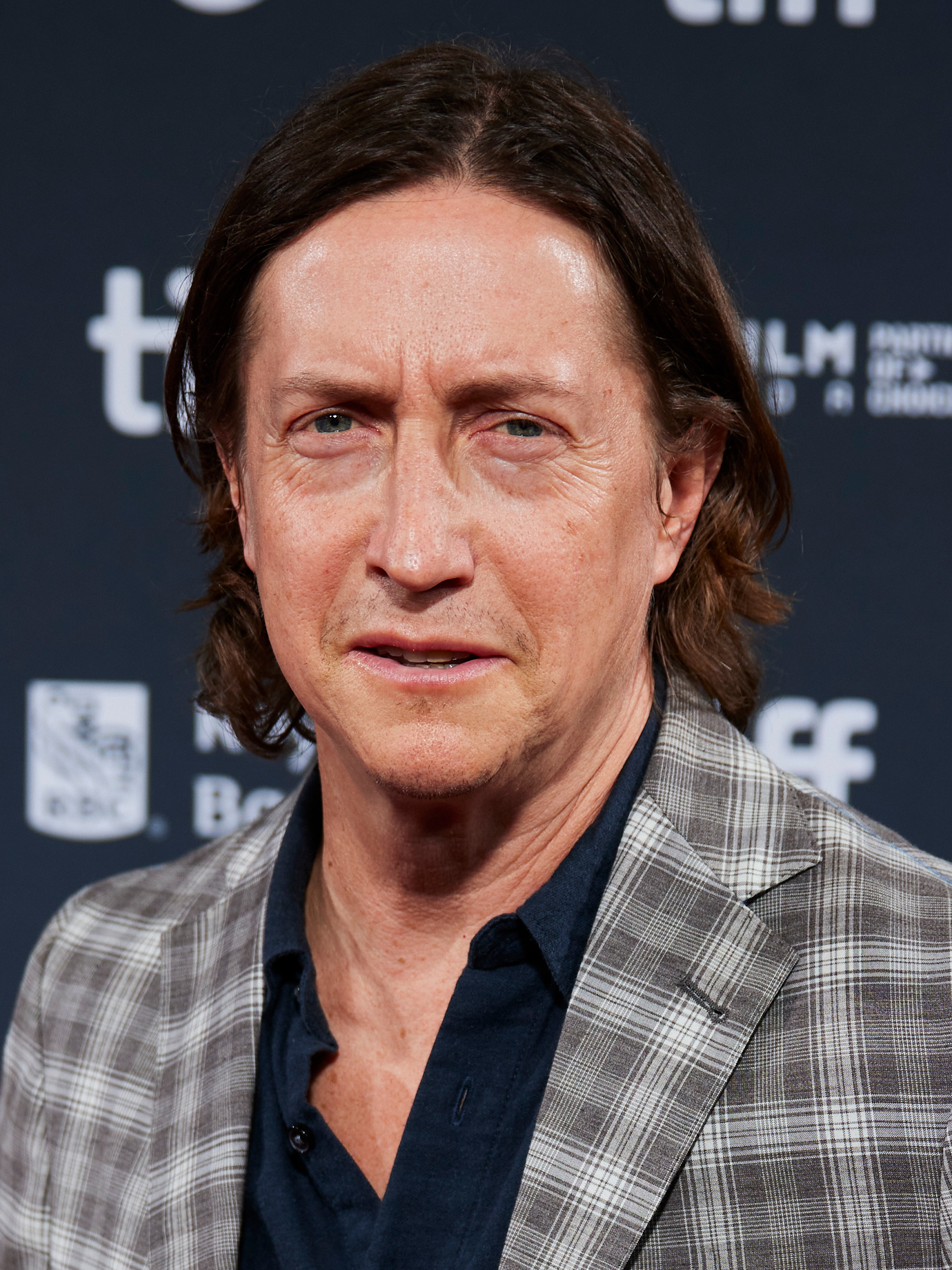
- Green at the 2024 Toronto International Film Festival
- Born: April 9, 1975 (age 51); Little Rock, Arkansas, U.S.
- Education: University of North Carolina School of the Arts
- Occupations: Film director; film producer; television producer; screenwriter
- Years active: 1997–present

David Gordon Green (born April 9, 1975) is an American filmmaker. Green began his career in 1997 and gained fame with the independent film George Washington (2000). He directed two additional independent dramas, All the Real Girls (2003) and Snow Angels (2007), as well as the thriller Undertow (2004), all of which he wrote or co-wrote.

In 2008, Green transitioned into Hollywood studio comedies, directing the films Pineapple Express (2008), Your Highness and The Sitter (both 2011). He briefly returned to his dramatic roots with the independent films Prince Avalanche (2013), Joe (2013), and Manglehorn (2014). Following this departure, he returned to studio films with Our Brand Is Crisis (2015) and Stronger (2017). Green directed a trilogy of slasher films for the Halloween franchise: Halloween (2018), Halloween Kills (2021), and Halloween Ends (2022), which he co-wrote with frequent collaborator Danny McBride. Green directed The Exorcist: Believer (2023) and the Christmas comedy Nutcrackers (2024).

Green has also directed episodes of the comedy series Eastbound & Down (2009–2013), Red Oaks (2014–17), Vice Principals (2016–17), and The Righteous Gemstones (2019–2025), on all of which he additionally served as executive producer.

== Early life ==
Green, one of four children, was born in Little Rock, Arkansas, and grew up in Richardson, Texas. His mother, Jean Ann (née Hunter), was a Lamaze instructor, and his father, Hubert Gordon Green Jr., was a medical school dean. Green attended Richardson High School, the University of Texas at Austin, and the University of North Carolina School of the Arts, where he studied film directing. He currently lives in Charleston, South Carolina.

== Career ==
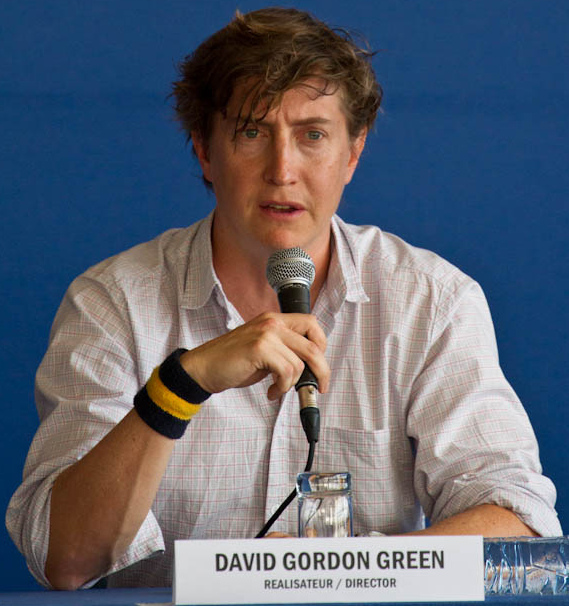
Green at the 2013 Deauville American Film Festival

As a college student, Green made the two short films, Pleasant Grove and Physical Pinball, at the North Carolina School of the Arts prior to his feature film debut in 2000, the critically acclaimed George Washington, which he both wrote and directed. He followed that with All the Real Girls in 2003 and Undertow in 2004. In 2007, he directed Snow Angels, his first adaptation, based on the Stewart O'Nan novel. The film debuted at the Sundance Film Festival and stars Sam Rockwell and Kate Beckinsale. It was released by Warner Independent Pictures.

In 2008, Green's career transitioned when he directed the Seth Rogen buddy comedy Pineapple Express, and the HBO series Eastbound & Down, for which he directed twelve episodes and served as a consulting producer. In 2011, he co-created the animated series Good Vibes and directed the comedies Your Highness and The Sitter, both of which received negative reviews.

In 2013, Green briefly returned to independent film when he directed and co-wrote Prince Avalanche and Joe. He followed these films with Manglehorn (2014), Our Brand Is Crisis (2015), and Stronger (2017).

In 2018, Green directed the horror sequel Halloween, produced by Jason Blum, executive produced by John Carpenter, and co-written by Green and Danny McBride. He also directed its sequels Halloween Kills, released in October 2021, and Halloween Ends, released in October 2022.

In December 2020, it was announced Green will direct a new installment of The Exorcist franchise which will be a direct sequel to William Friedkin's 1973 film adaptation of the 1971 novel. The Exorcist: Believer was released in October 2023. Before his death, Friedkin was asserted to have said: "the guy who made those new Halloween sequels is about to make one to my movie, The Exorcist. That's right, my signature film is about to be extended by the man who made Pineapple Express. I don't want to be around when that happens. But if there's a spirit world, and I can come back, I plan to possess David Gordon Green and make his life a living hell."

Green subsequently directed the Christmas-set comedy Nutcrackers, which premiered at the 2024 Toronto International Film Festival. Of the film, Green stated; "This movie is a lot of things. It's a comedy, it's a drama, it's a horror movie. But for me, it's a reason to dance, you know, I just wanted to start moving, move my body a little bit, and get out to the farm and kick some pig shit." Green's next film, Supermax, which began filming in August 2026, provided a comeback opportunity for star Will Smith after the 2022 Oscar slapping incident. To promote the film, Smith shared a video flaunting his expensive Christian Louboutin sneakers which his son gifted to commemorate the first day.

== Filmography ==
=== Film ===
Year	Title	Director	Writer	Producer
2000	George Washington	Yes	Yes	Yes
2003	All the Real Girls	Yes	Yes	No
2004	Undertow	Yes	Yes	No
2007	Snow Angels	Yes	Yes	No
2008	Pineapple Express	Yes	No	No
2011	Your Highness	Yes	No	No
2011	The Sitter	Yes	No	No
2013	Prince Avalanche	Yes	Yes	Yes
2013	Joe	Yes	No	Yes
2014	Manglehorn	Yes	No	Yes
2015	Our Brand Is Crisis	Yes	No	No
2016	Goat	No	Yes	No
2017	Stronger	Yes	No	No
2018	Halloween	Yes	Yes	Executive
2021	Halloween Kills	Yes	Yes	Executive
2022	Halloween Ends	Yes	Yes	Executive
2023	The Exorcist: Believer	Yes	Yes	Executive
2024	Nutcrackers	Yes	No	Executive
TBA	Supermax	Yes	No	No

Executive producer

- The Comedy (2012)
- Compliance (2012)
- Nature Calls (2012)
- See Girl Run (2012)
- Camp X-Ray (2014)
- Land Ho! (2014)
- Booger Red (2015)
- Hot Sugar's Cold World (2015)
- Donald Cried (2016)
- Fraud (2016)
- Flower (2017)
- Dayveon (2017)
- Arizona (2018)
- An Evening with Beverly Luff Linn (2018)
- The Legacy of a Whitetail Deer Hunter (2018)
- City of Joel (2018)

Producer

- Shotgun Stories (2007)
- Great World of Sound (2007)
- The Catechism Cataclysm (2011)

Actor

Year	Title	Role
2022	The Unbearable Weight of Massive Talent	Himself
2022	Bones and All	Brad
2023	I'm a Virgo	Bartender

=== Television ===
Year(s)	Title	Director	Executive Producer	Notes
2009–2013	Eastbound & Down	Yes	Yes	12 episodes
2011	Black Jack	Yes	No	Unaired TV pilot
2011	Good Vibes	No	Yes	Also writer and co-creator
2014	Chozen	No	Yes	
2014–2017	Red Oaks	Yes	Yes	6 episodes
2016–2017	Vice Principals	Yes	Yes	8 episodes
2017	Unit Zero	Yes	No	Unaired TV pilot
2017	There's... Johnny!	Yes	Yes	Episodes: "Andy Goes to Hollywood" and "Dog Day Afternoon"
2017	Tarantula	No	Yes	
2019–2025	The Righteous Gemstones	Yes	Yes	9 episodes
2019	Dickinson	Yes	Yes	Episodes: "Because I could not stop" and "I have never seen 'Volcanoes'"
2020	Mythic Quest: Raven's Banquet	Yes	Yes	Episodes: "Pilot", "The Casino" and "The Convention"
2021	The Sex Lives of College Girls	Yes	Yes	Episode: "Welcome to Essex"
2023	Telemarketers	No	Yes	
2026	Scarpetta	Yes	Yes	5 episodes
2026	Maximum Pleasure Guaranteed	Yes	Yes	Episode: "Magnets"
2026	The Hawk	Yes	Yes	4 episodes

== See also ==
- David Gordon Green's unrealized projects
