= Shotgun Stories =

- Theatrical release poster
- Directed by: Jeff Nichols
- Written by: Jeff Nichols
- Produced by: David Gordon Green; Lisa Muskat; Jeff Nichols
- Starring: Michael Shannon; Douglas Ligon; Barlow Jacobs
- Cinematography: Adam Stone
- Edited by: Steven Gonzales
- Music by: Lucero; Pyramid
- Distributed by: Multicom Entertainment Group Inc.
- Release dates: February 14, 2007 (Berlin International Film Festival); March 26, 2008 (United States)
- Running time: 92 minutes
- Country: United States
- Language: English
- Budget: $250,000
- Box office: $168,237-$284,000

Shotgun Stories is a 2007 American independent Southern Gothic revenge drama film written and directed by Jeff Nichols and produced by David Gordon Green, Lisa Muskat, and Nichols.

Nichols' feature directorial debut, the film focuses on two sets of redneck half-brothers in rural southeastern Arkansas who start a feud against each other following the death of their shared biological father, an abusive alcoholic who leaves his first family and later starts a second family after getting sober and becoming a Christian. The first set of brothers, are led by Son Hayes (portrayed by Michael Shannon), a working-class fish farmer, whereas the second set of brothers are led by Cleaman Hayes (portrayed by Michael Abbott Jr.), a middle-class cotton and soybean farmer.

Son decides to crash the funeral of the father who abandoned him and his two brothers, Kid (portrayed by Barlow Jacobs) and Boy (portrayed by Douglas Ligon), and berate his father in front of the attendees. This provokes Cleaman and his three brothers to bring wrath on his half-brothers in a feud throughout the film.

Filming took place on location in the counties of Lonoke, Pulaski, and Arkansas around the towns of England, Scott, Keo, and Stuttgart in Arkansas during 2004, on a budget of $250,000.

== Plot ==
Son Hayes wakes up and gets dressed, revealing that he has scars from a shotgun blast on his back. He meets his younger brothers, Boy and Kid, who live in a van and a tent respectively, tells them that his wife Annie has left him over his gambling habit, and invites them to live in his house. Son and Kid earn meager livings at a fish farm, where workers take bets on how Son received his scars; Boy is an unsuccessful basketball coach at the local middle school. One night, while Son is researching his gambling system, the boys' estranged mother arrives to announce that their estranged father (from whom she has long been divorced) has just died.

The brothers crash the funeral, where their father's second family is mourning. Son delivers a scathing commentary on their father, especially for callously abandoning them to be raised by their hateful mother, while going off to raise a second set of sons, forgetting, for the most part, his first set of sons. In the process, Son nearly starts a brawl with his four half-brothers. The eldest half-brother, Mark, vows revenge and starts a chain of violent confrontations. Meanwhile, Annie returns and tries to salvage her relationship with Son, but Son is unwilling to give up gambling. Kid plans on marrying his girlfriend, Cheryl, should he get an expected raise, but worries about providing for her and staying faithful. After Mark kills Boy's dog by leaving a venomous snake in its water bowl, Kid attacks and kills Mark, but is himself severely injured in the fight and dies in the hospital. Son and Boy are unaware that Mark's brothers Stephen and John were involved in the fight until after Kid's funeral, when an acquaintance named Shampoo tells them. Son then goes to their mother, who is coldly indifferent to everything that is happening, to inform her that Kid has just died, while condemning her for raising her sons to be full of hate toward their half-brothers, before leaving her for the last time.

The confrontations between the remaining brothers escalate, with Son on one side and John and Stephen Hayes on the other side unwilling to let the matter rest, despite their brother Cleaman's attempts to stop the feud. Son and Boy invade their half-brothers' farm and attack Stephen, but are interrupted and hospitalized by the remaining family and other farm workers. Annie and Cheryl are left grieving and bewildered by the continued fighting. Boy purchases a shotgun and holds Cleaman at gunpoint, but hesitates after seeing the man's sons, and leaves. Boy expresses worry that Son will kill himself trying to protect him from the half-brothers. He recalls how Son received his scars while protecting him and Kid.

The second family arms themselves with shotguns on their farm, bracing for a shootout. Boy arrives at the farm unarmed and states that he is done fighting, offering a truce. The less combative half-brothers force Stephen to accept the truce, but he worries that Son will not hold to the agreement. Afterwards, Son falls into a coma, but awakens soon after. Boy returns to check on Son, who recuperates from his injuries. The movie ends with the beginning of fall, Cleaman seeing his youngest brother John off to college, Boy coaching again, and Son living at home with Annie and their son, Carter. The final scene of the movie shows Son and Boy enjoying a peaceful afternoon on the porch with Carter.

== Cast ==
- Son Hayes – Michael Shannon
- Boy Hayes – Douglas Ligon
- Kid Hayes – Barlow Jacobs
- Nicole – Natalie Canerday
- Annie Hayes – Glenda Pannell
- Stephen Hayes – Lynnsee Provence
- Cleaman Hayes – Michael Abbott Jr.
- Mark Hayes – Travis Smith
- Shampoo Douglas – G. Alan Wilkins

== Production ==
After coming up with the concept of a modern-day feud-based revenge film after hearing the Drive-By Truckers song "Decoration Day," Nichols started work on Shotgun Stories by taking a year-long period collecting images, developing characters, locations and story points. After completing his research, he spent five months writing the script, drawing influence from Southern literary figures such as Larry Brown, Harry Crews, Flannery O'Connor, and the working-class realism of Raymond Carver. Nichols also took influence from films such as Hud, Badlands, and Tender Mercies. He had written the film with actor Michael Shannon in mind for the lead role of Son Hayes, with Nichols deciding he wanted him in every film he would ever make after seeing him in 8 Mile and High Crimes.

After completing his script in June 2004, Nichols had reached out to Shannon through Gary Hawkins, one of his former professors at the University of North Carolina School of the Arts. Hawkins had worked with Shannon before through a lab with the Sundance Institute on a project called Downtime, to which he had shown to his students at the UNCSA, including Nichols. Nichols had then asked Hawkins if he could get a hold of Shannon for him to read the script for Shotgun Stories. Impressed with Nichols' script, signed on for the film and agreed to star in it for free.

Filming took place on-location during a 21-day period in the fall of 2004, in the counties of Lonoke, Pulaski, and Arkansas around the towns of England, Scott, Keo, and Stuttgart in southeast Arkansas. The film was shot on 35 mm by his friend and film cinematographer Adam Stone, after Nichols sought advice from producer and UNCSA alum David Gordon Green after he shot George Washington on 35 mm on a production budget of $42,000.

== Critical reception ==
Shotgun Stories has positive reviews, earning an 90% rating at Rotten Tomatoes from 49 reviews, with an average rating of 7.3/10. The site's critical consensus reads: "Thanks to a talented cast and its uncommon depth, Nichols' debut manages to rise above its overly familiar plot."

It appeared on several critics' top ten lists of the best films of 2008. Bill White of the Seattle Post-Intelligencer named it the best film of 2008, Philip Martin of the Arkansas Democrat-Gazette named it the third best film of 2008, David Edelstein of New York magazine named it the eighth best film of 2008, and Roger Ebert of Chicago Sun-Times named it one of the best films of the year.
