= Snow Angels (film) =

2007 film by David Gordon Green

- Theatrical release poster
- Directed by: David Gordon Green
- Screenplay by: David Gordon Green
- Based on: Snow Angels by Stewart O'Nan
- Produced by: Dan Lindau; R. Paul Miller; Lisa Muskat; Cami Taylor
- Starring: Kate Beckinsale; Sam Rockwell; Michael Angarano; Jeanetta Arnette; Griffin Dunne; Nicky Katt; Tom Noonan; Connor Paolo
- Cinematography: Tim Orr
- Edited by: William Anderson
- Music by: David Wingo; Jeff McIlwain
- Production companies: Crossroads Films; True Love Productions
- Distributed by: Warner Independent Pictures
- Release dates: January 19, 2007 (Sundance); March 7, 2008 (United States)
- Running time: 107 minutes
- Country: United States
- Language: English
- Budget: $1.5 million
- Box office: $402,858

Snow Angels is a 2007 American independent crime drama film written and directed by David Gordon Green, based on Stewart O'Nan's 1994 novel, and starring Sam Rockwell and Kate Beckinsale. The film is centered on several characters dealing with loss of innocence during the winter in a small town in Appalachian Pennsylvania. It premiered in the dramatic competition at the 2007 Sundance Film Festival, and was released in the United States on March 7, 2008, by Warner Independent Pictures.

== Plot ==
On a cold afternoon, with snow on the ground, a high school band in a small town in Western Pennsylvania is practicing for the season's last football game, when they hear gunshots while their teacher, Mr. Chervenick, is giving instructions. The film abruptly flashes back to a few weeks before, to a Chinese restaurant that employs a high school boy named Arthur, his ex-babysitter, Annie, and her best friend, Barb. Arthur, who's a bit of a misfit, has a troubled home life caused by his constantly clashing parents, both of whom often forget about him. Annie's life isn't faring much better: she's dealing with her ill mother, is separated from her husband, Glenn, and is now raising their young daughter, Tara, on her own. Glenn is now on the wagon and becoming a born-again Christian in order to prove that he is responsible enough to spend time with Tara.

Depressed and lonely, Annie decides to betray her best friend by having an affair with Barb's husband, Nate, but finds that ruining Barb's life doesn't make her own life any happier. Desperate to prove himself and still harboring deep feelings for his estranged wife (though he suspects she is seeing someone), Glenn gets a new job and spends as much time as possible with Tara. Meanwhile, Arthur finds himself growing close to Lila, a new student at the high school who has a knack for photography.

The film focuses heavily on how people's lives can cross in a small town, especially when Tara wanders out of the house and goes missing while Annie, drained over having meaninglessly destroyed her friendship with Barb and suffering from a bad cold, falls asleep on the couch. The whole town spends hours desperately searching for Tara, before Arthur finds her body while smoking pot with his friend. To everyone's horror, Tara had fallen into open freezing water at the edge of the lake while playing and drowned, after which the open water froze over her. Glenn, distraught over the death of Tara, breaks into Annie's home with his shotgun and waits for her return. Upon Annie's return Glenn grabs her and forcibly washes her feet. Covering her mouth as she cries and screams at him, he drags a barefoot Annie by the collar into the snowy woods. With her kneeling, back turned to him, Glenn holds his gun to her head and tells her to say when she's ready (to be shot). The film ends with Glenn killing Annie and committing suicide in his truck.

== Cast ==
- Kate Beckinsale as Annie Marchand
- Sam Rockwell as Glenn Marchand
- Michael Angarano as Arthur Parkinson
- Jeannetta Arnette as Louise Parkinson
- Griffin Dunne as Don Parkinson
- Nicky Katt as Nate Petite
- Tom Noonan as Mr. Chervenick
- Connor Paolo as Warren Hardesky
- Amy Sedaris as Barb Petite
- Olivia Thirlby as Lila Raybern
- Grace Hudson as Tara Marchand

== Production ==
Filming, in-part, occurred on-location in Nova Scotia, Canada.

== Reception ==
=== Critical response ===
The film received generally positive reviews from critics. The review aggregator website Rotten Tomatoes reports a 68% approval rating with an average rating of 6.7/10 based on 112 reviews. The website's consensus reads, "With fine acting and considerable emotional depth, Snow Angels aptly captures the highs, and especially the lows of human relationships." Metacritic reported the film had an average score of 67 out of 100, based on 28 reviews.

Steven Rea of the Philadelphia Inquirer called the film "a compelling, and grim, portrait of small-town lives gone wrong", "disturbingly good", while also writing, "the film's characters get inside your skin, your soul. It's enough to make you want to cry." Richard Corliss of Time wrote, "The film's success is due in large part to actors who are both faithful to all the social minutiae and seductive enough to keep you watching." He also praised director David Gordon Green for his gift, "to show how people learn codes of affection and aggression from watching movies, but when they try to pull them off in crucial situations they come out awkward, embarrassed and futile."

The film appeared on some critics' top ten lists of the best films of 2008. Marc Mohan of The Oregonian named it the 4th best film of 2008, and Michael Phillips of the Chicago Tribune named it the 8th best film of 2008.

=== Box office ===
The film opened in limited release in the United States on March 7, 2008, and grossed $14,247 in two theaters its opening weekend.

== DVD release ==
Warner Home Video released Snow Angels on DVD on September 16, 2008, on a single disc in widescreen and full screen versions.
