= Hit the Road =

Hit the Road may refer to:

- Hit the Road (1941 film), American crime comedy film
- Hit the Road (2021 film), Iranian comedy-drama film
- Hit the Road (TV series), 2017 American comedy series
- "Hit the Road" (The Upper Hand), a 1995 television episode

== See also ==
- Hit the Road Jack (disambiguation)
- Hit the Road Running, a 1983 film
