= Undertow (2004 film) =

2004 American psychological thriller film

- Theatrical release poster
- Directed by: David Gordon Green
- Screenplay by: Joe Conway; David Gordon Green
- Story by: Terrence Malick (as Lingard Jervey)
- Produced by: Terrence Malick; Edward R. Pressman; Lisa Muskat
- Starring: Jamie Bell; Dermot Mulroney; Devon Alan; Shiri Appleby; Josh Lucas
- Cinematography: Tim Orr
- Edited by: Zene Baker; Steven Gonzales
- Music by: Philip Glass
- Production company: United Artists
- Distributed by: MGM Distribution Co.
- Release dates: September 2004 (Deauville); October 22, 2004
- Running time: 108 minutes
- Country: United States
- Language: English
- Box office: $157,000

Undertow is a 2004 American Southern Gothic psychological thriller film directed by David Gordon Green, who cowrote the film's screenplay with Joe Conway based on an original story by Terrence Malick (under the pseudonym Lingard Jervey). Starring Jamie Bell, Devon Alan, Dermot Mulroney and Josh Lucas, the film tells the story of two boys and their farmer father being pursued by a murderous uncle in rural Georgia.

The film premiered at the 2004 Deauville Film Festival, and released on October 22, 2004 in the United States. Met with a mixed response from critics, the film received special recognition for excellence in filmmaking from the National Board of Review of Motion Pictures.

== Plot ==
Following the death of his wife Audrey, John Munn (Dermot Mulroney) moves with his two sons, mid-teen Chris Munn (Jamie Bell) and adolescent Tim Munn (Devon Alan), to a pig farm in rural Drees County, Georgia, where they lead a reclusive life. Chris is a rebellious, troubled teen, resulting in frequent contact with police.

John's brother Deel (Josh Lucas) visits the family. The two boys are surprised; they do not even know of his existence. Deel wants a hoard of gold coins from John that their father left them. Deel eventually finds them. John refuses to give them to Deel. In the ensuing struggle, Deel murders him. He tries to kill Chris and Tim as well, but they escape and run away from home with the coins.

On the run, the boys meet an assortment of fairytale-like characters. Deel pursues them, eventually succeeding. Wading into a river, Chris throws away the gold coins into the water. Enraged by the loss, Deel struggles with Chris, attempting to drown him. However, Deel is fatally stabbed in the chest.

Chris appears to wake up in the hospital. There, he is reunited with Tim and their grandparents.

== Cast ==
- Jamie Bell as Chris Munn
- Dermot Mulroney as John Munn
- Devon Alan as Tim Munn
- Shiri Appleby as Violet
- Josh Lucas as Deel Munn
- Terry Loughlin as Officer Clayton
- Robert Longstreet as Bern
- Eddie Rouse as Wadsworth Pela
- Patrice Johnson as Amica Pela
- Charles "Jester" Poston as Hard Hat Dandy
- Kristen Stewart as Lila

== Reception ==
The film received mixed reviews from film critics. On Rotten Tomatoes, it holds an approval rating of 54% based on 120 reviews, with an average rating of 5.9/10. The website's critics consensus reads: "Undertow's gently fantastical elements are balanced by fully realized characters and a story with genuine, steadily accumulating emotional weight." On Metacritic, the film earned a score of 63 out of 100 based on 30 reviews.

Among the critics who gave the film a positive review were Roger Ebert, who praised the film, giving it a full four stars. He wrote of the director, "Green has a visual style that is beautiful without being pretty. We never catch him photographing anything for its scenic or decorative effect." Ebert would later place the film tenth on his list of the best films of 2004. Owen Gleiberman of Entertainment Weekly gave the film a favorable review, calling it an "art film posing as a backwoods gothic thriller." Eric Harrison of the Houston Chronicle wrote: "From its opening lines and first enigmatic image, everything about Undertow is both dreamlike and real, artfully elusive and matter-of-fact." James Berardinelli gave it three out of four stars, giving praise to the performances, writing: "Those going to Undertow expecting a thriller will find the proceedings slow going. However, those who are seduced by the characters and the setting will find that the 105 minutes pass quickly." The Washington Post's Stephen Hunter thought the film conjured up the 1955 thriller The Night of the Hunter, and wrote, "the movie builds slowly to its grinding climax, and the suspense – the standard by which a thriller must primarily be judged – is first-rate."

== Awards and nominations ==
Event	Award	Recipient	Result
2004 National Board of Review Awards	Special Recognition For Excellence In Filmmaking	Undertow	Won
2004 Deauville American Film Festival	Grand Special Prize	David Gordon Green	Nominated
2005 Young Artist Awards	Best Performance in a Feature Film: Leading Young Actor	Jamie Bell	Won
2005 Young Artist Awards	Best Performance in a Feature Film: Supporting Young Actor	Devon Alan	Won
2005 Young Artist Awards	Best Performance in a Feature Film: Supporting Young Actress	Kristen Stewart	Nominated
