= Fraud (film) =

2016 American film by Dean Fleischer-Camp

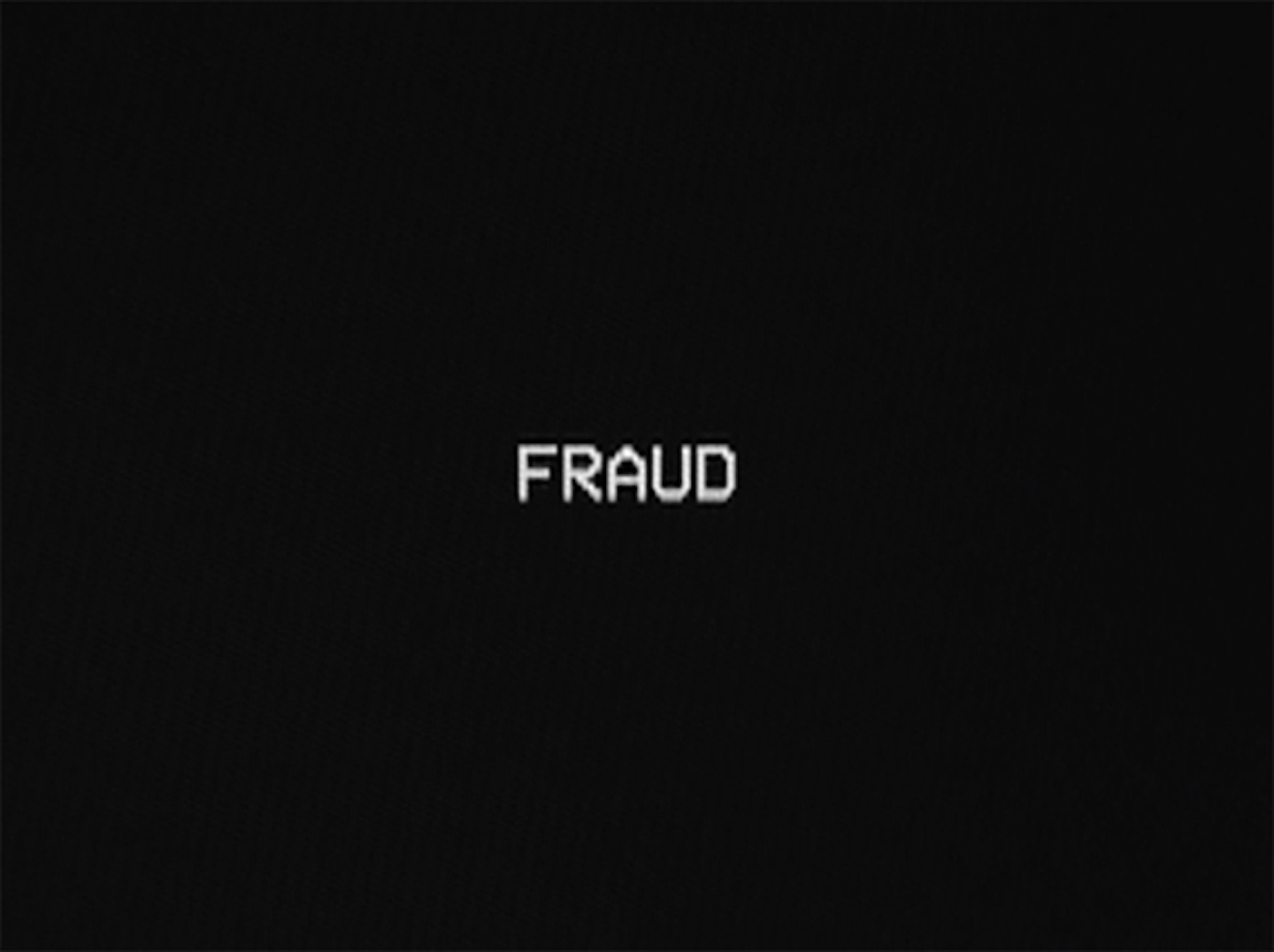
- Title card
- Directed by: Dean Fleischer-Camp
- Produced by: Riel Roch-Decter; Sebastian Pardo
- Edited by: Jonathan Rippon
- Production companies: Memory; Rough House Pictures
- Release date: May 2016
- Running time: 52 minutes
- Country: United States
- Language: English

Fraud is a 2016 conceptual collage film directed by Dean Fleischer Camp (credited at the time of release as Dean Fleischer-Camp) in his directorial debut. The film is made up of re-edited home videos uploaded to YouTube. It tells the fictional story of an average American family of four obsessively shopping at big-box stores until their increasing mountain of debt leads them to go to extremes in order to wipe the slate clean and keep the money flowing.

David Gordon Green, Jody Hill, and Danny McBride serve as executive producers through Rough House Pictures.

== Origins ==
Fleischer Camp was digging through clips on the user-generated content platform YouTube when he stumbled across over 100 hours of home video footage documenting the life of an unknown American family, the Arnolds, and uploaded to the Internet between 2008 and 2015, by the patriarch Gary. Fleischer Camp was initially hesitant to turn it into a documentary because of the effort and time required to cut the footage down to feature length.

== Release ==
The film had its world premiere at Hot Docs in May 2016 where the premiere was controversial, with arguments breaking out during post-screening Q&As between the director and members of the audience as well as amongst the audience members themselves. The film has been selected to screen at BAMcinemaFest at the Brooklyn Academy of Music in New York and the Sheffield International Documentary Festival (SIDF) in the United Kingdom.
