= Tarantula (TV series) =

- Created by: Carson Mell
- Based on: Tarantula by Carson Mell
- Starring: Carson Mell; Dan Bakkedahl; Jacob Vargas; Lauren Weedman; Steve Jones
- Composers: Jack Long w/ Alexandra Johnstone; Carl Harders
- Country of origin: United States
- Original language: English
- No. of seasons: 1
- No. of episodes: 10 (2 unaired)

Production
- Executive producers: Carson Mell; Danny McBride; Jody Hill; David Gordon Green; Brandon James; Claudia Katz; Gregg Vanzo (animation)
- Running time: 30 minutes
- Production companies: Rough Draft Studios; Rough House Pictures; Solid Brass; Studio T

Original release
- Network: TBS
- Release: December 4 – December 25, 2017

Tarantula is an American adult animated sitcom. It is adapted from a web series of the same name, which was released on YouTube by its creator, Carson Mell, from 2012 to 2015. It aired on TBS from December 4 until December 25, 2017.

On March 19, 2018, TBS canceled the series after one season. Mell has since revived and continued the original web series that the TV series was based on.

== Premise ==
A respected but uncertified tattoo artist delivers absurd yet introspective monologues about the residents of the Tierra Chula Resident Hotel and their misadventures.

== Cast ==
- Carson Mell as Echo Johnson, Booty
- Dan Bakkedahl as Lucas
- Jacob Vargas as Paja
- Lauren Weedman as Bess
- Steve Jones as Dominic

== Development ==
Creator Carson Mell has stated that the inspiration for the show and the original webseries came from his exasperation with "anti-hero" humor. Departing from the misanthropic humor of contemporary adult animation shows such as Rick and Morty, Mell instead sought "to make a show where people are nice to each other, where if you hurt someone's feelings it's a big deal."

== Episodes ==
The entire season was released on the TBS app/website on December 3, 2017.

No.	Title	Directed by	Written by	Original release date	U.S. viewers (millions)
1	"Seesaw"	Dwayne Carey-Hill	Carson Mell	Unaired (Note: This episode premiered on December 3, 2017 on TBS.com and the TBS app.)	N/A
The story begins when Echo's dog Seesaw is unjustly seized by a bureaucratic government agency, it's up to Echo and his friends to get the critter back.
2	"Mushroom Valley"	Ira Sherak	Carson Mell	Unaired	N/A
When a highfalutin scientist impugns Echo's claims of fantastic fungi, Echo and Booty set off on a journey to retrieve a specimen, and quiet the know-it-all for good.
3	"Toast of the Town"	Ken Bruce; Edmund Fong	Carson Mell	December 4, 2017	0.38
Lucas and Echo attempt to breach the gates of Hollywood when Lucas discovers a hot-shot producer ripped him off.
4	"One Weird Mama"	Crystal Chesney-Thompson	Carson Mell & Alexandra Johnstone	December 4, 2017	0.23
Bess tries to win back her daughter after her ex-husband returns.
5	"Macaroni Salad"	David Au	Carson Mell	December 11, 2017	0.38
When romantic foibles leads a friend to the edge of oblivion, Echo must retrieve the melodramatic fool from the brink.
6	"The Shade"	Ira Sherak	Sam West & Alexandra Johnstone	December 11, 2017	0.28
Echo ventures to the fabled Weird River to retrieve a man whose life is derailed by Echo's egg-frying antics
7	"Pajattery"	Dwayne Carey-Hill	Alexandra Johnstone	December 18, 2017	0.34
Echo finds out that Paja does pottery at a retirement home and Custer tries to get back into his old biker gang.
8	"Frog Flog"	David Au	Sam West	December 18, 2017	0.25
While making their own hot spring, Echo and Booty find a mystical frog.
9	"Shabzinzo"	Edmund Fong	Grant Faldereau	December 25, 2017	0.34
When Echo is wronged by a wealthy fool, he is sent a very fancy gift that instantly proves itself a burden, and sends him on a journey to rid himself of it.
10	"Pig Head"	Crystal Chesney-Thompson	Carson Mell	December 25, 2017	0.25
Echo reckons with his past.

== Broadcast ==
Prior to the television release date, the entire series was released on the TBS website and app on December 3, 2017. The series made its television debut on December 4, 2017, at 10pm on TBS.

== Ratings ==
The series premiere involved the back to back broadcast of episodes 3 and 4 as the first two episodes were not aired on broadcast television. Episode 3 attracted 380,000 viewers and episode four had 230,000 viewers.
