= B movie (disambiguation) =

A B movie is a low-budget commercial movie, but one that is not an art film.

B movie may also refer to:

== Film ==
- Movie with a B Rating, a film rating of the National Legion of Decency
- Bee Movie, a 2007 animated film produced by, co-written and starring Jerry Seinfeld
- B-Movie: Lust & Sound in West-Berlin 1979–1989, a 2015 film about the life of Mark Reeder

== Games ==
- Invasion from Beyond or B-Movie, a 1998 Sony PlayStation game

== Music ==
- B-Movie (band), an English new wave band
- B-Movie (video album), a 2004 DVD by MxPx
- "B-Movie", track by poet Gil Scott-Heron from his 1981 album Reflections
- "B Movie", a song by Elvis Costello & the Attractions from Get Happy!! 1980
