= Nutcrackers (film) =

2024 film by David Gordon Green

- Release poster
- Directed by: David Gordon Green
- Written by: Leland Douglas
- Produced by: Rob Paris; Mike Witherill; Nate Meyer
- Starring: Ben Stiller; Linda Cardellini; Homer Janson; Ulysses Janson; Atlas Janson; Arlo Janson; Toby Huss; Edi Patterson; Tim Heidecker
- Cinematography: Michael Simmonds
- Edited by: Colin Patton
- Music by: Aaron M. Fernandez Olson
- Production companies: Rivulet Films; Rough House Pictures
- Distributed by: Hulu
- Release dates: September 5, 2024 (TIFF); November 29, 2024 (United States)
- Running time: 104 minutes
- Country: United States
- Language: English

Nutcrackers is a 2024 American comedy drama film directed by David Gordon Green, written by Leland Douglas, and starring Ben Stiller. The film premiered as the opening film of the 2024 Toronto International Film Festival.

== Plot ==
Michael Maxwell is pulled away from his job in Chicago, following the death of his sister Janet and her husband Steve. In rural Ohio, he winds up having to look after his nephews Justice, Junior, Samuel, and Simon Kicklighter, as social worker Gretchen Rice looks for a foster home who will take them.

The Kicklighter kids live on a farm and are unruly children who are homeschooled and partake in dangerous recreational activities. Mike is supposed to close a realtor deal for a train yard, but his advisor Carol threatens to give the project to the untested Devin, whom Mike clearly despises.

The Kicklighter kids force Mike to think on his feet, while he in turn slowly grows accustomed to their rural living. He bonds with them about Janet who ran a dance studio in town where they learned ballet. A couple offers to take the two younger Kicklighters, but Mike refuses to separate them.

The kids vie for wealthy socialite Al Wilmington to take them in, so Mike secures an invitation to his mansion for a Christmas party. While there, Justice is revealed to be in a relationship with a girl named Mia, who also went to the dance studio.

While Mike quickly rubs elbows with everyone there, the kids end up destroying a nativity display with a golf cart that sinks in the swimming pool, souring their chances of getting fostered by Al. Mike goes to another prospect he met named Rose, but she turns out to be fostering solely for money and comes onto Mike, forcing him to turn her down.

Carol passes Mike up for Devin, angering him, but continues his search for potential foster homes. Junior, having written a "better" version of The Nutcracker ballet, inspires Mike to produce it for the local theater, not just to get funding, but also to potentially give the kids a greater chance of getting fostered. Justice initially refuses, until Mike convinces Mia to also be part of the performance.

With the performance underway, Gretchen brings up how Mike's search for a foster family has inadvertently made him attached to his nephews, something he refused to acknowledge. When he still insists that what he is doing is a good thing (calling the kids a "pain in the ass"), his words are overheard by the Kicklighters. Just as Carol calls back to inform Mike that he is needed after all, the kids disappear before the performance starts.

Mike informs everyone in attendance that the play has been cancelled, however it is revealed that the kids have moved the performance outside on the street, at their parents' memorial. Everyone delightedly watches the play while standing in the street.

During the performance, Justice stabs Mike with his prop sword as he feigns an injury. He finally comes to the realization that he loves his nephews and congratulates them, promising that he will never leave them. Everyone celebrates in the street.

During the credits, the family is shown opening presents on Christmas. Gretchen arrives on her motorcycle and Mike gives her a present. Mike is revealed to have bought Justice an ATV and the two ride off a ramp (based on an earlier comment about the kids wanting to do so). In post-credits audio, the two are revealed to have failed the jump.

== Cast ==
- Ben Stiller as Mike Maxwell
- Linda Cardellini as Gretchen Rice
- Homer Janson as Justice Kicklighter, Mike's first nephew
- Ulysses Janson as Junior Kicklighter, Mike's second nephew
- Arlo Janson as Simon Kicklighter, Mike's third nephew and Samuel's identical twin brother
- Atlas Janson as Samuel Kicklighter, Mike's fourth nephew and Simon's identical twin brother
- Toby Huss as Al Wilmington
- Edi Patterson as Rose
- Tim Heidecker as Deputy Cox
- Maren Heisler as Mia
- Alexander Louis as Gingerbread Man

== Production ==
"This movie is a lot of things. It's a comedy, it's a drama, it's a horror movie. But for me, it's a reason to dance, you know, I just wanted to start moving, move my body a little bit, and get out to the farm and kick some pig shit."

— David Gordon Green

Written by Leland Douglas and developed by Rough House Pictures, the film is directed by David Gordon Green. Ben Stiller is producing the film through Red Hour Films. Also producing are John Lesher for Red Hour Films and Rivulet Media's Rob Paris and Mike Witherill, and Rough House’s Nate Meyer. Green shot the film on 35 mm film.

Ben Stiller was revealed to be leading the cast in December 2023, his first lead film role in six years. In January 2024, Linda Cardellini, Edi Patterson, Tim Heidecker and Toby Huss joined the cast. Four real-life brothers portray Stiller's nephews in the film, with Homer, 12, Ulysses, 10, and 8-year-old twins Arlo and Atlas Janson all making their film debuts. Their mother Karey Williams was a film school classmate of Green's and scenes were filmed at their family farm in Ohio, with all the animals, except for the snake the kids put in the toilet to scare Michael (Stiller), actually theirs. All four are trained ballet dancers.

Principal photography began in Wilmington, Ohio, in late 2023 and wrapped around January 2024 outside Cincinnati.

== Release ==
Nutcrackers premiered as the opening film at the 2024 Toronto International Film Festival on September 5, 2024. A few days later, Hulu was said to be in final talks to acquire distribution rights to the film in an eight-figure deal for a Christmas release. The film was released on Hulu and on Disney+ internationally on November 29, 2024.

== Reception ==
On the review aggregator website Rotten Tomatoes, 46% of 59 critics' reviews are positive, with an average rating of 5.2/10. The website's consensus reads: "Ben Stiller's sturdy performance gives Nutcrackers some heart, but a clichéd story and indifferent execution make this holiday dramedy about as delightful as getting socks for Christmas." Metacritic, which uses a weighted average, assigned the film a score of 54 out of 100, based on 14 critics, indicating "mixed or average" reviews.
