= Good Vibes (American TV series) =

American adult animated sitcom

- Genre: Animated sitcom
- Created by: David Gordon Green; Brad Ableson; Mike Clements
- Developed by: Tom Brady; Brad Ableson; Mike Clements
- Voices of: Josh Gad; Adam Brody; Debi Mazar; Jake Busey; Tony Hale; Danny McBride; Olivia Thirlby; Alan Tudyk
- Country of origin: United States
- Original language: English
- No. of seasons: 1
- No. of episodes: 12

Production
- Executive producers: Tom Brady; Brad Ableson; David Gordon Green; Mike Clements
- Running time: 20 minutes
- Production companies: Werner Entertainment; Rough House Pictures; Not the QB Pro.; 6 Point Harness; Warner Horizon Television; MTV Production Development

Original release
- Network: MTV
- Release: October 27 – December 29, 2011

Good Vibes is an American adult animated sitcom created by David Gordon Green and Brad Ableson and Mike Clements for MTV.

The show was originally sold to Fox in 2008, and a pilot produced. When Fox passed, the producers looked for other buyers and in 2010 they received a series order at MTV.

On February 24, 2012, the series was cancelled after one season.

== Plot ==
The series follows the exploits of recent New Jersey transplant Mondo and his new best friend Woodie as they live their life in Playa Del Toro, a fictional Southern California beach town.

== Characters ==
- Montgomery "Mondo" Brando (voiced by Josh Gad): Mondo is a young overweight teenage boy from Bayonne, New Jersey.
- Woodford "Woodie" Stone (voiced by Adam Brody): Woodie is Mondo's best friend who is a lazy, laid-back and hedonistic surfer.
- Barbara "Babs" Brando (voiced by Debi Mazar): Babs is Mondo's mother.
- Winthrop Aguilera Wadska (voiced by Tony Hale): Wadska is a hyperactive, perverted, and pint-sized nerd.
- Jeena Wadska (voiced by Olivia Thirlby): Jeena is a popular and attractive girl who is Mondo's crush.
- Dirk Kirk "Turk" Turkpatrick (voiced by Jake Busey): Turk is the resident tough guy.
- Milan Stone (voiced by Kari Wahlgren): Milan is Woodie's sister.
- Voneeta Teets (voiced by Danny McBride): The sex-ed teacher at Del Toro High.
- Lonnie (voiced by Alan Tudyk): A hippie and Gulf War vet who lives in a van by the beach.
- HJ & BJ Kuntz (both voiced by Cree Summer): Identical twin sisters who are Milan's friends/entourage.

== Episodes ==
No.	Title	Directed by	Written by	Original release date	Prod. code	US viewers (millions)
1	"Pilot"	Chris Martin	David Gordon Green; Tom Brady and Christian Lander	October 27, 2011	GV101	1.598
Jersey boy Mondo moves to a laid-back Southern California beach town in the premiere of this animated comedy. He feels like an outsider until he meets Woodie, a local teen who offers to help him navigate through what life is like in his hometown.
2	"Floatopia"	Lucas Gray	Dan Lagana	November 3, 2011	GV104	1.119
The boys find out about a loophole that lets them drink alcohol on the open seas, so they throw a party off the shore.
3	"Tech Rehab"	Tyree Dillikay	Jon Silberman and Josh Silberman	November 10, 2011	GV108	1.066
The kids' parents get frustrated with the younger generation's dependence on technology, so they send the gang on a wilderness trip with a former tech addict, which goes horribly wrong.
4	"Don't Blow Your Wadska"	Ira Sherak; Brock Gallagher	Jon Silberman; Josh Silberman	November 17, 2011	GV102	0.768
Mondo finds out his crush's parents are out of town, and uses her eccentric brother to get close to her during a sleepover that goes horribly wrong. Babs and Ms. Teets go out. Absent: Milan.
5	"The D-List"	Lucas Gray	Brian Sides	December 1, 2011	GV107	N/A
Mondo accidentally drops his pants after swimming in freezing water, exposing himself to the entire school. Then, he's ranked at the bottom of "The D-List."
6	"Breast Friends"	Tyree Dillikay	Dana Min Goodman; Julia Wolou	December 1, 2011	GV103	N/A
Jeena launches a mobile breast-exam initiative, inspiring the boys to cross-dress so they can attend and observe the event.
7	"The Grass is Always Greener"	Ira Sherak; Brock Gallagher	Becca Greene	December 8, 2011	GV106	N/A
Mondo escorts Woodie's sister to her sweet-16 and gets a little too comfortable in her wealthy world.
8	"Red Tuxedo"	Brad Ableson	Jon Silberman; Josh Silberman	December 15, 2011	GV112	N/A
Mondo and Woody find out that Jeena and Turk broke up, so Mondo finds out that this is his chance to be with Jeena on the night of prom. Meanwhile, Wadska helps Mila Kunis hide from photographers and in return takes Mila to the prom. Note: According to MTV this was supposed to be the season finale, yet it aired too early.
9	"Mondo Mia!"	Greg Frankin	Jacob Young; Story by : Tom Brady, Jacob Young, Becca Greene	December 15, 2011	GV111	N/A
Mondo tries to find out the identity of his father by hacking his mother's Facebook account.
10	"Virgin Hangover"	Greg Frankin	George Smith	December 22, 2011	GV105	N/A
Mondo, Woodie and Wadska ditch school in search of a nudist beach. Absent: Milan.
11	"Surf Legend"	Brock Gallagher	Christian Lander	December 29, 2011	GV110	0.419
Woodie loses a surf competition and worries that he's lost his "stoke," so the boys turn to Woodie's surf hero, Duke Sanchez, for help conquering an infamous wave, which would bring Woodie's "stoke" back. Milan thinks she might be pregnant.
12	"Backstage Babs"	Chris Martian	George Smith	December 29, 2011	GV109	N/A
A call from the principal's office makes Babs worry that she's been too lax as a parent, so she decides to step up her parenting skills when she takes Mondo to a music festival, and helps him impress Jenna in the process. Wadska helps Turk get into the concert.

== Reception ==
Good Vibes received mixed reviews from critics. San Francisco Chronicle's David Wiegand found its writing to be "juvenile, hormonal and often pretty dang funny", while Pittsburgh Post-Gazette's Rob Owen branded it "aggressively dumb, sex-obsessed and occasionally misogynistic". Emily VanDerWerff of The A.V. Club criticized the pilot, praised later episodes and expressed optimism towards the series' future, mentioning that "this isn't a recommendation exactly—there are still a few too many problems with the surface level of the show—but the undercarriage is sound, and it wouldn't be surprising if this developed into a surprisingly sweet and winning little show given enough time".

On Metacritic the show achieved a score of 58 based on reviews from 9 critics. On Rotten Tomatoes it has a score of 70%, with an average rating of 6.15/10. It was cancelled by MTV on February 24, 2012, due to low ratings.
