= Prince Avalanche =

- Theatrical release poster
- Directed by: David Gordon Green
- Written by: David Gordon Green
- Based on: Either Way by Hafsteinn Gunnar Sigurðsson
- Produced by: Lisa Muskat; Derrick Tseng; Craig Zobel; James Belfer; David Gordon Green
- Starring: Paul Rudd; Emile Hirsch
- Cinematography: Tim Orr
- Edited by: Colin Patton
- Music by: Explosions in the Sky; David Wingo
- Production companies: To Get to the Other Side; Muskat Filmed Properties; Dogfish Pictures; Lankn Partners; DreamBridge Films; The Bear Media; Rough House Pictures
- Distributed by: Magnolia Pictures
- Release dates: January 20, 2013 (Sundance); August 9, 2013 (United States)
- Running time: 94 minutes
- Country: United States
- Language: English
- Budget: $700,000 (estimated)
- Box office: $442,313

Prince Avalanche is a 2013 American comedy-drama film written and directed by David Gordon Green and starring Paul Rudd and Emile Hirsch. The screenplay is based on the 2011 Icelandic film Either Way (Á annan veg). The film was shot in Bastrop, Texas, after the Bastrop County Complex Fire.

== Plot ==
In 1988, an odd pair of sorts, meditative and stern Alvin and his girlfriend's brother, Lance, dopey and insecure, leave the city behind to spend the summer in solitude repainting traffic lines down the center of a country highway ravaged by wildfire. As they sink into their job in the remarkable landscape, they learn more than they want to about each other and their own limitations. They regularly encounter a drunk truck driver. As Lance leaves for a weekend in the city, Alvin enjoys his solitude and explores the woods by himself. He comes across a house that has been burned to the ground by the wildfire, and encounters a woman who explains that it is her house, and she is searching in the rubble for her pilot's license.

Lance returns distraught and with a black eye, claiming to have been beat up by the boyfriend of a woman he had been courting. Lance later finds that his sister Madison, Alvin's girlfriend, has sent Alvin a Dear John letter and the couple are heard arguing on the phone about Alvin's absence and Madison's new lover.

After a brief fight the two console each other about their predicaments. Lance reveals that the real reason behind his distress is that a middle-aged woman he has been seeing is pregnant with his child, and he laments and ponders his fears of fatherhood and responsibility. Alvin encourages Lance to embrace parenthood and assures him he will be a great father, and the two form an unlikely friendship. Alvin nicknames their duo "Alvinlance."

In a final scene, they greet the truck driver, and Alvin notices the woman he had encountered earlier entering his truck, but the truck driver does not see her.

== Cast ==
- Paul Rudd as Alvin
- Emile Hirsch as Lance
- Lance LeGault as Truck Driver
- Joyce Payne as Lady

== Production ==
The idea of making Prince Avalanche came when the band Explosions in the Sky proposed the idea of making a movie with director David Gordon Green at Bastrop State Park, which was being restored following the 2011 Bastrop County Complex fire. Adapted from Hafsteinn Gunnar Sigurðsson's 2011 film Either Way, the script for Prince Avalanche consisted of roughly 65 pages – about 30 pages short of an average feature-length screenplay. From development onward, the film was fast tracked to completion. "We really didn’t have time for proper or traditional development," said Gordon Green. "We had the idea in February of 2012, we were filming in May, and sound mixing in July. It was an unusually tight production schedule." Paul Rudd joked to an Entertainment Weekly interviewer, "I found the biggest challenge of working on this was trying to stifle my alpha-male [masculinity]."

The film's entire production was done in secret; it was only announced to the public after completion in June 2012. This was at the request of the director, David Gordon Green, who wanted to get back to his independent roots after his last three films were completed by a major film studio. Principal photography for Prince Avalanche began in May 2012 and lasted for 16 days in Bastrop State Park. Because of its scale, the film was shot with a small 15-person film crew. While already mid-shoot, the film crew came across Joyce Payne, a resident of the area whose home was destroyed in the fire. Fascinated by her story, Gordon Green included her in the film. "It wasn’t scripted at all; it was something very real for her that we documented," said Gordon Green. "It ended up being pivotal. I couldn’t imagine the movie without it now."

== Release ==
Prince Avalanche premiered at the 2013 Sundance Film Festival on 20 January. It then had its international premiere in competition at the 63rd Berlin International Film Festival on 13 February 2013 where David Gordon Green won the Silver Bear for Best Director. It subsequently screened at U.S. festivals such as South by Southwest and Maryland Film Festival.

== Reception ==
Prince Avalanche received positive reviews and has an approval rating of 82% on Rotten Tomatoes based on 123 reviews with an average score of 6.90/10. The consensus states: "A step back in the right direction for director David Gordon Green, Prince Avalanche shambles amiably along with a pair of artfully low-key performances from Paul Rudd and Emile Hirsch." Metacritic gives the film a score of 73 out of 100, based on 29 critics, indicating "generally favorable reviews".

== Soundtrack ==
The soundtrack was scored by Explosions in the Sky and David Wingo.
