= B-Movie (video game) =

1998 video game

- North American cover art
- Developer: King of the Jungle
- Publisher: GT Interactive
- Platform: PlayStation
- Release: PAL: November 1998; NA: December 1998
- Genre: Action
- Mode: Single-player

B-Movie (also known as Invasion from Beyond in North America) is a PlayStation game released in 1998, developed by King of the Jungle and published by GT Interactive.

== Plot ==
This game is inspired by the science fiction B-movies from the 1950s. Martians have arrived at Earth to launch an alien invasion. Players choose aircraft to fight back at the alien invaders and save others.

== Development ==
The game was developed by King of the Jungle, a company founded in early 1995.

== Reception ==
Reception

Aggregate score
Aggregator	Score
GameRankings	62%

Review scores
Publication	Score
AllGame	2.5/5
CNET Gamecenter	7/10
Consoles +	89%
Computer and Video Games	2/5
Edge	6/10
Game Informer	6.75/10
GameSpot	7.6/10
IGN	6.5/10
Next Generation	1/5
PlayStation Official Magazine – UK	8/10
Official U.S. PlayStation Magazine	2/5

The game received "mixed or average" reviews according to the review aggregation website GameRankings.

GameSpot said, "what King of the Jungle has achieved here is impressive and bodes well for future efforts from this fledgling collection of industry veterans. [...] Invasion From Beyond arrives like a bolt out of the blue and adds an exciting new take on the 'vehicular combat' genre."

On the other hand, Next Generation said, "Don't let the cool retro box art fool you. This game deserves to be passed on, even when it's staring up from the bottom of the bargain bin."
