= The Sitter =

2011 film by David Gordon Green

- Theatrical release poster
- Directed by: David Gordon Green
- Written by: Brian Gatewood; Alessandro Tanaka
- Produced by: Michael De Luca
- Starring: Jonah Hill; Max Records; Ari Graynor; J. B. Smoove; Sam Rockwell
- Cinematography: Tim Orr
- Edited by: Craig Alpert
- Music by: Jeff McIlwain; David Wingo
- Production companies: Michael De Luca Productions; Rough House Pictures; 20th Century Fox
- Distributed by: 20th Century Fox
- Release date: December 9, 2011
- Running time: 81 minutes
- Country: United States
- Language: English
- Budget: $25 million
- Box office: $34.9 million

The Sitter is a 2011 American movie directed by David Gordon Green and written by Brian Gatewood and Alessandro Tanaka. The film follows a slacker college student (played by Jonah Hill) who, after being suspended, is forced by his mother to fill in for a babysitter that called in sick. During this time, he takes his charges along for his extensive criminal escapades.

The film is a Michael De Luca Productions and 20th Century Fox joint venture, distributed by 20th Century Fox. The film was originally scheduled to be released in theaters on August 5, 2011, but was pushed back to December 9, 2011. It received generally negative reviews from critics and grossed $34 million against its $25 million budget.

== Plot ==
Noah Griffith is an unemployed suspended college student who lives with his divorced mother in New Jersey. After Noah returns home from his sex buddy Marisa's house, his mother tells him that her plans to go to a party with her friends the Pedullas have been ruined because the Pedullas' babysitter canceled last minute. Noah takes over as babysitter to allow his mother to go out with her friends.

Noah arrives at the Pedullas' house and is introduced to the kids by their mother. The older son Slater has a severe anxiety disorder. Their daughter Blithe is obsessed with pop culture and loves to wear makeup. Their younger son Rodrigo is a pyromaniac adopted from El Salvador who likes to run away from home. As soon as their parents leave, the children start to act obnoxiously and Rodrigo smashes several vases.

Marisa calls Noah and asks him to bring cocaine to a party, saying that she'll repay him with sex afterwards. Noah immediately accepts, and he and the children leave to get the drugs from Marisa's friend. Noah meets Marisa's drug dealer Karl Fairhurst and his assistant Julio Murphy. After Karl gives the drugs to Noah, Rodrigo enters the building and claims that he has to go to the bathroom. When Noah and Rodrigo leave, Noah finds out that Rodrigo stole a baby dinosaur egg filled with cocaine from Karl's house. While attempting to get the egg back from Rodrigo, Noah accidentally breaks it, getting cocaine all over his face. Karl calls Noah and tells him that if he doesn't bring the egg back or the $10,000 he owes for the egg, he will kill him.

Not wanting to be a part of this, Slater asks Noah to take the three of them to the party where their parents are. When Noah sees his mother actually having a good time at the party, he can't bring himself to interfere, and decides to bring the kids with him. Slater then tells Noah that two twins are texting him asking him to attend a bat mitzvah for Wendy Sapperstein (a girl that goes to his school). He tells Noah that the bat mitzvah is being held at the Grand Prospect Hall. Noah then comes up with the idea that they can steal the money Wendy will receive.

At the bat mitzvah, the twins take Slater to dance while Noah steals money. Noah manages to only steal $3,000 because he's forced to leave when Rodrigo urinates on the floor. While leaving, Slater catches his best friend Clayton in a lie and tells him that he doesn't want to hang out with him anymore. They also find out that Tina, who went to high school with Noah, has stolen the car to get revenge on Noah, who went to a party at her house and threw up on her grandmother's ashes while drunk. Noah gives the $3,000 to Karl and also brings $7,000 worth of checks. Karl refuses the checks and gives Noah one more chance at getting the $7,000. He tells Noah to meet him at the party Marisa is at with the money and if he doesn't, he will kill him.

Noah goes to his dad for help, but he refuses because he now hates Noah due to him dropping out of college and just being a loser in general. An angry Noah steals his father's car keys and drives to the jewelry store his dad owns. Noah steals enough jewelry to pay back Karl, but Rodrigo blows the store up after placing a cherry bomb in the bathroom. Rodrigo throws a temper tantrum and tosses Slater's fanny pack containing his medicine out the window. Noah stops the car so Slater can get the pills. Noah tells Slater that he's not going to find them, and it is then revealed that Slater is gay, and the pills were the only thing that kept him "normal." Noah makes Slater accept the fact that he's gay, and that there is nothing wrong with it.

The group sees their stolen minivan drive by and they track it down to a club where Noah confronts Tina about stealing the car. Tina finally lets go of her anger towards Noah by punching him in the face. Noah leaves and the group head out to get the money to Karl. On the way, Noah is pulled over by police, who steal the jewelry and the cocaine that Karl originally gave him. Karl's gang tracks Noah down and attempts to kill him and the kids, but Noah manages to get away. Noah engages in a car chase with Karl and Julio. Karl's car crashes when Noah throws a cherry bomb into their van. Noah spins out and Karl holds him at gunpoint. Blithe calls Tina's gang and they beat Karl up so Noah and the kids can escape.

Noah drops Marisa off at her house and the two break up. Noah manages to get the kids home on time and they see that everything that went on that night is on the news. Their parents arrive home and they pay Noah for the night.

During the end credits, it is revealed that Noah got a new girlfriend, Slater grew up and got a job in the entertainment industry, Blithe gave up her pop culture obsession and started inventing perfumes as an adult, Rodrigo gave up being a pyromaniac, Karl was hospitalized after being beat up by Tina's gang, and Julio burned to death.

== Cast ==
- Jonah Hill as Noah Scott Griffith, a suspended college student.
- Max Records as Slater Pedulla, the neurotic oldest son of John & Amy.
- Ari Graynor as Marisa Lewis, Noah's sex buddy.
- Sam Rockwell as Karl Fairhurst, a drug lord.
- JB Smoove as Julio Murphy, Karl's right-hand man.
- Landry Bender as Blithe Pedulla, the vain, celebrity-obsessed daughter of John & Amy.
- Kevin Hernandez as Rodrigo Pedulla, the unpredictable adopted son of John & Amy.
- Kylie Bunbury as Roxanne, Noah's college classmate.
- Erin Daniels as Amy Pedulla, Slater & Blithe's biological mother and Rodrigo's adoptive mother
- D. W. Moffett as John Pedulla, Slater & Blithe's biological father and Rodrigo's adoptive father
- Jessica Hecht as Sandy Griffith, Noah's mother
- Bruce Altman as Jim Griffith, Noah's father
- Cliff "Method Man" Smith as Jacolby
- Sean Patrick Doyle as Garv, Karl's roller-skating lackey.
- Alex Wolff as Clayton, Slater's best friend
- Jack Krizmanich as Ricky Fontaine
- Samira Wiley as Tina, a girl Noah had wronged in the past.
- Nicky Katt as Officer Petite. This was Katt's final film role before his death in 2025.
- Jessica DiGiovanni as party girl (Unrated version)
- Grace Aronds as herself
- Jane Aronds as herself
- Gracie Lawrence as Wendy Sapperstein

== Reception ==
=== Box office ===
The Sitter grossed $30.4 million in the United States and Canada and $4.5 million in other territories for a total gross of $34.9 million, against a production budget of $25 million.

The film made $9.9 million in its opening weekend, finishing second at the box office behind New Year's Eve ($13 million).

=== Critical response ===
On Rotten Tomatoes the film has an approval rating of 22% based on 111 reviews, with an average rating of 4.3/10. The site's critical consensus reads, "With its recycled plot, misguided gags, and formula performance from Jonah Hill, The Sitter adds up to another disappointing entry from director David Gordon Green." On Metacritic the film has a score of 39 out of 100, based on 29 critics, indicating "generally unfavorable reviews". Audiences polled by CinemaScore gave the film an average grade of "C+" on an A+ to F scale.

Empire magazine awarded it a score of two out of five stars, saying " It never really gels except for a few spots here and there." The Guardian awarded it one out of five stars, saying "Very light on gags, and then, with an awful inevitability, very heavy on the sentimental life-lessons getting learnt by Noah and his adorable young charges. Avoid." Roger Ebert awarded it one out of four stars, saying "I don't blame Green for working in the genre. But I blame him for making a bad movie that isn't funny." The Hollywood Reporter gave the film a more mixed review, saying "The fusion works far better than Green's sword-and-sandal-and-stoners dud Your Highness, but is unlikely to connect with audiences like his previous '80s riff Pineapple Express."

=== Home media ===
The Sitter was released on DVD and Blu-ray on March 20, 2012.
