= Donald Cried =

- Theatrical release poster
- Directed by: Kristopher Avedisian
- Screenplay by: Kristopher Avedisian
- Story by: Kyle Espeleta; Jesse Wakeman
- Produced by: Allison Rose Carter; Sam Fleischner; Kyle Martin
- Starring: Kristopher Avedisian; Jesse Wakeman; Louisa Krause; Ted Arcidi
- Cinematography: Sam Fleischner
- Production companies: Electric Chinoland; Rough House Pictures
- Distributed by: The Orchard
- Release dates: March 12, 2016 (SXSW); March 3, 2017 (United States)
- Running time: 85 minutes
- Country: United States
- Language: English
- Box office: $61,406

Donald Cried is a 2016 American comedy-drama film written and directed by Kristopher Avedisian. The film stars Kristopher Avedisian, Jesse Wakeman, Louisa Krause and Ted Arcidi. The film was released on March 3, 2017, by The Orchard.

== Plot ==
A Manhattanite banker returns to his hometown to pick up an urn and forgets his wallet. He seeks help from a home across the street only to find that it is still occupied by his high school neighbor who prevents him from leaving by appealing to their historic emotional connection.

== Cast ==
- Kristopher Avedisian as Donald
- Jesse Wakeman as Peter
- Louisa Krause as Kristin
- Ted Arcidi as Corey
- Shawn Contois as Logan
- Donny Fite as Doug Deflippo
- Kate Fitzgerald as Barbara
- Jeremy Furtado as Brian Touty
- Patrick Languzzi as Barry
- Robby Morse Levy as Karen

== Release ==
The film premiered at South by Southwest on March 12, 2016. The film was released on March 3, 2017, by The Orchard.

=== Critical reception ===
On the review aggregator website Rotten Tomatoes, 89% of 38 critics' reviews are positive. The website's consensus reads: "Donald Cried's dark, squirm-inducing humor is laced with bracing honesty -- and marks writer-director-star Kris Avedisian as a filmmaker to watch." On Metacritic, the film has a weighted average score of 72 out of 100 based on 13 critics, which the site labels as "generally favorable" reviews.
