= Genre (disambiguation) =

Genre is the term for any category of literature or other forms of art or culture.

Genre may also refer to:

- Music genre, category of musical works with shared characteristics
- Genre (magazine), an American gay men monthly
- Genre (animated film), a short film by animator Don Hertzfeldt
- "Genre" (Westworld), a 2020 television episode
- Genre art, pictorial representations in any of various media that represent scenes or events from everyday life
- Genre Arts founded by Carlton Cuse

== People ==
- Julien Genre (Julien Michelle Genre) (born 1989), Italian curler
