= The Exorcist: Believer =

2023 film by David Gordon Green

- Theatrical release poster
- Directed by: David Gordon Green
- Screenplay by: Peter Sattler; David Gordon Green
- Story by: Scott Teems; Danny McBride; David Gordon Green
- Based on: Characters by William Peter Blatty
- Produced by: Jason Blum; David C. Robinson; James G. Robinson
- Starring: Leslie Odom Jr.; Lidya Jewett; Olivia O’Neill; Jennifer Nettles; Norbert Leo Butz; Ann Dowd; Ellen Burstyn
- Cinematography: Michael Simmonds
- Edited by: Tim Alverson
- Music by: David Wingo; Amman Abbasi
- Production companies: Morgan Creek Entertainment; Blumhouse Productions; Rough House Pictures
- Distributed by: Universal Pictures
- Release date: October 6, 2023
- Running time: 111 minutes
- Country: United States
- Language: English
- Budget: $30 million
- Box office: $137 million

The Exorcist: Believer is a 2023 American supernatural horror film directed by David Gordon Green, who co-wrote the screenplay with Peter Sattler from a story by Scott Teems, Danny McBride, and Green. The sixth installment in The Exorcist franchise, it serves as a legacy sequel to The Exorcist (1973). The film stars Leslie Odom Jr., Lidya Jewett, Olivia O'Neill in her film debut, Jennifer Nettles, Norbert Leo Butz, and Ann Dowd. Ellen Burstyn and Linda Blair reprise their roles from the original film. Its plot follows a photographer who must confront the apex of evil when his daughter and her best friend are possessed.

Jason Blum served as a producer on the film through his Blumhouse Productions banner, alongside David and James G. Robinson through their Morgan Creek Entertainment banner, in association with executive producers Green and McBride's Rough House Pictures. The project began as a sequel to the original film in December 2020. Universal Pictures collaborated with Peacock to acquire distribution rights in July 2021 for $400 million, with intentions of launching a new trilogy of The Exorcist films. Principal photography took place between November 2022 and March 2023 on a production budget of $30 million.

The Exorcist: Believer was released in the United States on October 6, 2023. It grossed $137 million at the box office and received negative reviews from critics. Following the film's poor reception, a planned trilogy was scrapped the following year, with the franchise being rebooted with The Exorcist: Martyrs under Mike Flanagan.

== Plot ==
In Haiti, photographer Victor Fielding and his pregnant wife Sorenne are on their honeymoon when a massive earthquake ensues. Sorenne is gravely injured, and paramedics tell Victor he must choose to save either his wife or child.

Thirteen years later, Victor has lost faith in God since Sorenne's death and raises his now-adolescent daughter Angela by himself in Georgia. One day after school, Angela ventures into the woods with her Baptist best friend Katherine West to perform a séance, attempting to contact Angela's mother. The girls go missing and a three-day manhunt ensues.

The girls are found in a barn on the third day; though traumatized, they seem relatively normal, having suffered only burns to their feet. As their conditions rapidly deteriorate, Victor admits Angela into the hospital where their nurse neighbor Ann attends to her. Ann, convinced that Angela is possessed after she reveals her knowledge of Ann's experience in the novitiate as a prospective nun and her secret abortion, gives Victor a memoir written by Chris MacNeil, who experienced a similar situation with her daughter Regan 50 years ago. (Note: As depicted in The Exorcist (1973)) Chris has spent her life researching exorcisms in every culture, becoming world-renowned for her studies. Regan became distant from her mother due to the memoir's success and has not seen her since. Victor meets with Chris, who visits Angela. Visiting Katherine's home, Chris performs a deliverance ritual on Katherine, who stabs Chris in the eyes with a cross, blinding her.

Victor, Ann, and Katherine's parents Tony and Miranda, reach out to the Church for an exorcism. Chris advises Victor to use methods from all different cultures, and the group seeks the help of Father Maddox, a local priest; Don Revans, the West family's Baptist pastor; Stuart, a Pentecostal preacher; and Dr. Beehibe, a rootwork healer. The group plans an ecumenical exorcism, but the local Catholic diocese forbids Maddox from participating as they feel the children are suffering from a psychiatric disorder.

As the group proceeds with the exorcism, the demon reveals that Victor did not choose to keep Angela thirteen years ago; he chose Sorenne but she died anyway from her injuries. The demon says they need to choose which of the girls gets to live and which one will die, and if a choice is not made, it will kill them both. While Miranda and Victor both refuse to forsake each other's child, Maddox, who has a change of heart, rejoins the group. Maddox reads from the Roman Ritual, only for the demon to telekinetically snap his neck and kill him. Victor regains his faith and begins to pray the Lord's Prayer, which he learned as a child. As Victor apologizes to Angela and uses Sorenne's scarf to attempt to strengthen her against the demon, Tony yells that he chooses to save Katherine, and Angela flatlines. The demon then reveals that the one that was chosen would be the one who dies. Katherine screams for her parents as the demon drags her to Hell, while Angela revives and reunites with Victor.

In the aftermath, Angela returns to school, Miranda and Tony mourn, and Victor visits Sorenne's grave. In the hospital, Chris is reunited with Regan, who forgives her mother.

== Cast ==
- Leslie Odom Jr. as Victor Fielding, a photographer and single father
- Lidya Jewett as Angela Fielding, Victor's daughter
- Olivia O'Neill as Katherine West, Miranda and Tony's daughter
- Jennifer Nettles as Miranda West
- Norbert Leo Butz as Tony West
- Raphael Sbarge as Pastor Don Revans
- Okwui Okpokwasili as Dr. Beehibe
- Danny McCarthy as Stuart
- E. J. Bonilla as Father Maddox
- Linda Blair as Regan MacNeil, a woman who was possessed by Pazuzu when she was young in 1973
- Ann Dowd as Ann, a nurse
- Ellen Burstyn as Chris MacNeil, the author and Regan's mother, who has witnessed exorcism rituals before
- Tracey Graves as Sorenne Fielding, Victor's deceased wife who died while giving birth to Angela
- Celeste Oliva as Detective Konik
- Lize Johnston as Lamashtu

Additionally, Helen Leahey served as the "primary source" of the demon's voice, with the final effect being created using additional voicework by J. Molière and audio processing effects by the film's sound mixer Paul Urmson.

== Production ==
=== Development ===
In August 2020, it was reported that Morgan Creek Entertainment would be producing a new installment in The Exorcist franchise. A tentative theatrical release window of 2021 was planned by the studio. Ben Pearson of /Film noted that the studio had previously stated that it would "never attempt to remake The Exorcist", but that it would also obtain the "blessings of their library titles' original creators before they move forward with new entries".

In December 2020, it was clarified that the project in development would be a sequel to the original film, with David Gordon Green in early negotiations to serve as director. Jason Blum, David Robinson and James Robinson serve as producers. In July 2021, it was reported that a trilogy of sequels were concurrently in development with Green hired to direct the first of the new installments, from a script he co-wrote with Peter Sattler, from an original story he co-wrote with Scott Teems and Danny McBride. The film is a direct sequel to The Exorcist and the story does not acknowledge the events of the other four films in the franchise.

Green, McBride, Couper Samuelson, and Stephanie Allain serve as executive producers. Prior to acquiring the series' rights from Morgan Creek Entertainment, the writing team and Blum spent early 2020 devising the story over Zoom.

The projects are joint-venture productions between Blumhouse Productions and Morgan Creek Entertainment with Universal Pictures distributing. Universal collaborated with Peacock to purchase distribution rights for $400 million total. Parts two and three of the trilogy were optioned as potential Peacock exclusive films. By October 2021, Green expressed his intentions to direct all three films, with script outlines completed for the latter two films that he co-wrote with Sattler.

The Exorcist: Believer was the last film produced by James G. Robinson before his death in February 2026.

=== Casting ===
Leslie Odom Jr. starred as a father who tracks down Chris to help his possessed child. Ann Dowd, Lidya Jewett, Olivia Marcum and Okwui Okpokwasili were also cast. Raphael Sbarge joined the cast as a pastor. Jennifer Nettles has a "primary role" in the film. Helen Leahey was cast as the main voice of the demon.

Ellen Burstyn reprised her role as Chris MacNeil from the original film. Burstyn claimed she turned down their initial offer and ultimately asked them to fund a scholarship program at Pace University to which they agreed.

Linda Blair's cameo appearance was filmed in secret and not in the script. The scene shows the first time Blair and Burstyn have communicated in years. Green stated: "I told Ellen that Linda had agreed to do this, and they were going to be reunited. It was just something that felt right, and Linda felt comfortable. She walked in, and the moment was shared by the dropped jaws of the crew. The camera operator was crying, didn't know what was happening! The moment that you see Linda take a knee and take her hand is the first time they'd communicated in many, many years. It was the first take".

=== Filming ===
In February 2022, Burstyn stated that she had completed production for her part in the film. Though Green had previously stated that he would begin work on the sequel after completing Halloween Ends (2022), given the actress' age and the risks of the COVID-19 pandemic, the production team worked with Burstyn to make sure they had her part completed for the film. Linda Blair, who portrayed Regan MacNeil in the first film, was an "advisor" on set. Green stated to Total Film that "I was really lucky to have [Blair] read the script, but she was not interested in a significant role and stepping back into that. We brought her in as an advisor because we're dealing with young people, and we want to take them to dangerous places safely".

On a production budget of $30 million, principal photography began in November 2022, in Atlanta and Savannah, Georgia. Burstyn was brought in that month for reshoots. In mid-December, production was shut down early for the holidays after Odom had an "unspecified health issue". Filming concluded in early March 2023.

== Release ==
The Exorcist: Believer was released by Universal Pictures in the United States on October 6, 2023. It was previously set for October 13, before being moved up a week earlier to avoid competition with the concert film Taylor Swift: The Eras Tour.

=== Home media ===
The film was released on digital platforms by Universal Pictures Home Entertainment on October 24, 2023; it also began streaming exclusively on Peacock in the United States on December 1, 2023. It was later followed by a Blu-ray, DVD, and 4K UHD release on December 19, 2023.

=== Theme park attraction ===
In 2025, a haunted house attraction called Universal Horror Unleashed features characters from the film.

== Reception ==
"[T]he guy who made those new Halloween sequels is about to make one to my movie, The Exorcist. That's right, my signature film is about to be extended by the man who made Pineapple Express. I don't want to be around when that happens. But if there's a spirit world, and I can come back, I plan to possess David Gordon Green and make his life a living hell."

— William Friedkin as quoted by friend and critic Ed Whitfield

=== Box office ===
The Exorcist: Believer grossed $65.5 million in the United States and Canada, and $71.4 million in other territories, for a worldwide total of $137 million.

In the United States and Canada, The Exorcist: Believer was projected to gross $30–36 million from 3,663 theaters in its opening weekend. The film made $11.8 million on its first day, including $2.9 million from Thursday night previews. It went on to debut to $26.5 million, topping the box office and being the best of the franchise, but was noted as disappointing given mid-$30 million projections and the $400 million Universal spent to acquire the rights. The film made $11 million in its second weekend, finishing second behind newcomer Taylor Swift: The Eras Tour.

=== Critical response ===
On the review aggregator website Rotten Tomatoes, 22% of 250 critics' reviews are positive, with an average rating of 4.4/10. The website's consensus reads: "The Exorcist: Believer earns points for trying to take the franchise back to its terrifying roots, but a lack of new ideas – and scares – make this an inauspicious start to a planned new trilogy." Metacritic, which uses a weighted average, assigned the film a score of 39 out of 100, based on 54 critics, indicating "generally unfavorable" reviews. Audiences polled by CinemaScore gave the film an average grade of "C" on an A+ to F scale, the same as The Exorcist III and Exorcist: The Beginning, while those polled by PostTrak gave it a 61% positive score.

Owen Gleiberman, writing for Variety, said in his review: "The Exorcist: Believer, in its superficially competent and poshly mounted way, feels about as dangerous as a crucifix dipped in a bottle of designer water". David Rooney of The Hollywood Reporter said: "Unlike Green's Halloween trilogy, which served up diminishing returns with each new installment, Believer condenses that downward trajectory into the first chapter" and called the film "hella disappointing". In Plugged In, Paul Asay praised the film for its theme of emphasizing the importance of faith and community in rescuing the oppressed. John Mulderig in the Catholic Review noted: "William Friedkin['s] Watergate-era picture ... was a fairly straightforward confrontation between Regan's tormentor and two Catholic priests...[D]riving away of the devil here, by contrast, takes on the qualities of a circus...thus promot[ing] a syncretist, humanistic and even vaguely anti-Catholic outlook that could be spiritually dangerous for anyone inclined to take it seriously. On the whole, however, this half-a-century-later follow-up is best dismissed as a bit of chaotic schlock." David Fear of Rolling Stone wrote, "There are moments in this borderline incoherent mess of a movie in which fans may be convinced that its sole purpose is to try making the original follow-up, 1977's legendarily godawful Exorcist II: The Heretic, look positively genius by comparison."

USA Today's Brian Truitt gave the film a score of three out of four. He noted Burstyn's limited screen time, writing: "Odom gets a meatier character arc than Burstyn did back in the day, and while her return isn't as integral to the story as Jamie Lee Curtis' was to the rebooted Halloween, Chris' appearance adds needed weight to the Believer narrative. [...] With a formidable Believer and two more Exorcist movies in the pipeline, though, at least this franchise still has a prayer". Olly Richards of Empire felt differently about Burstyn's role: "The role feels gimmicky rather than essential and sets the film on a cheesier path of call-backs, winks, and attempts to one-up the original. It becomes a tribute act, its own personality shrinking in the shadow of a classic".

Stephanie Zacharek, in Time, notes, "As for Green's Exorcist: Believer, which starts out strong—evoking all the reasons demons in search of a body to possess can't resist the hormonal lightning rod of adolescent girls—and ends in a dumb jumble of generic-looking zombie-girl Blumhouse special effects: I've already forgotten it. Odom is a terrific actor[:] But poor Ellen Burstyn. Long after refusing to appear in Exorcist II, she agrees to show up in this thing—as the older version of Chris, now the ultimate coastal grandma, dressed in floaty, flattering white scarves and ropes of crystal beads—only to get about 10 minutes of screen time, during which her character suffers a needless and stupid indignity. Though it's not something she could have known some 47 years ago, Burstyn said yes to the wrong Exorcist sequel. If only she'd chosen the one with poetry in its soul."

=== Accolades ===
Award	Date of ceremony	Category	Recipient(s)	Result	Ref
Hollywood Music in Media Awards	November 15th, 2023	Best Original Score in a Horror Film	David Wingo and Amman Abbasi	Nominated	
Golden Raspberry Awards	March 9th, 2024	Worst Picture	Jason Blum, David C. Robinson, and James G. Robinson	Nominated	
Golden Raspberry Awards	March 9th, 2024	Worst Director	David Gordon Green	Nominated	
Golden Raspberry Awards	March 9th, 2024	Worst Screenplay	David Gordon Green, Peter Sattler, Scott Teems, and Danny McBride	Nominated	
Golden Raspberry Awards	March 9th, 2024	Worst Screen Combo	"Any 2 Money-Grubbing Investors Who Donated to the $400 Million for Remake Rights to The Exorcist"	Nominated	
Golden Raspberry Awards	March 9th, 2024	Worst Prequel, Remake, Rip-off, or Sequel	The Exorcist: Believer	Nominated	

== Cancelled sequels and planned reboot ==
In July 2021, two sequels were confirmed to be in development with the same creative team of Green, McBride, Sattler and Teems on board. The first of these sequels, The Exorcist: Deceiver, was originally scheduled to be released in theaters on April 18, 2025. In a 2024 interview with Indiewire, David Gordon Green revealed that the second film would've been set in Europe and would focus on the character of Nurse Ann played by Ann Dowd. After the poor reception of Believer, sources from The Hollywood Reporter claimed there would almost certainly be some degree of creative re-think for the next two films, and that Green had recently expressed some doubt about his participation. In January 2024, Green stepped down from Deceiver, and the film was removed from the release schedule shortly after. By May 2024, Mike Flanagan was in talks to write, direct and produce the next Exorcist film. He was officially confirmed to be helming a new Exorcist film later that month while it was also revealed that The Exorcist: Deceiver and the planned trilogy had been officially canceled with the franchise being rebooted. The film was slated for release on March 13, 2026, before being removed from Universal's release schedule in June 2025. Flanagan then revealed in a Tumblr post that the film was not going to begin production until after he finished work on the television series adaptation of Carrie and that there was "no way it's coming out next March." The film was later rescheduled to be theatrically released on March 12, 2027.
