= Arizona (2018 film) =

2018 dark comedy thriller film directed by Jonathan Watson

- Theatrical release poster
- Directed by: Jonathan Watson
- Written by: Luke Del Tredici
- Produced by: Dan Friedkin; Ryan Friedkin; Bradley Thomas; Danny McBride; Brandon James
- Starring: Danny McBride; Rosemarie DeWitt; Luke Wilson
- Cinematography: Drew Daniels
- Edited by: Jeff Seibenick
- Music by: Joseph Stephens
- Production companies: Imperative Entertainment; Rough House Pictures
- Distributed by: RLJE Films
- Release dates: January 20, 2018 (Sundance); August 24, 2018 (United States)
- Running time: 85 minutes
- Country: United States
- Language: English

Arizona is a 2018 American dark comedy thriller film directed by Jonathan Watson and written by Luke Del Tredici. The film stars Danny McBride, Rosemarie DeWitt, Luke Wilson, Elizabeth Gillies, Kaitlin Olson, David Alan Grier, and Lolli Sorenson. It premiered at the 2018 Sundance Film Festival on January 20, 2018, and was released in theaters and through video on demand on August 24, 2018, by RLJE Films.

== Plot ==
In 2009, in the midst of the real estate housing crisis, divorced realtor Cassie Fowler resides in Harding, Arizona, with her 14-year-old daughter Morgan.

Cassie is ridiculed one morning by Gary, her aggressive boss. While Cassie is on the phone with a debt collector regarding the potential foreclosure of her own home, a client named Sonny enters the office, enraged at Gary because the house he has sold is losing value. The argument turns physical and culminates with Gary being pushed over a ledge to his death. Sonny then notices Cassie, tries to convince her not to call the authorities, then knocks her unconscious and takes her to his house.

Sonny tells her he will let her go if she promises not to tell. When Sonny decides Cassie is lying, he ties her up just as his ex-wife Vikki enters the house. An argument ensues between Sonny and Vikki, ending with Sonny striking her in the head with a golf club.

Sonny has both women tied up. After a verbal argument where Vikki highlights how much of a loser he is, Sonny bashes Vikki in the face with a granite block, killing her. Cassie tries to calm him, but when he becomes suspicious that she is lying to him over simple facts, he decides to torment her by kidnapping Morgan.

Sonny arrives at Cassie's house and tells Morgan that Cassie has been in a car accident. Suspicious, Morgan attempts to make a phone call, and Sonny forces his way in. Able to hide in the house, Morgan calls 911, but Sonny has picked up on another line and tricks her into believing he is the operator and revealing her location in the house.

Cassie has untied herself and runs to the guard shack at the entrance to the housing development. The guard is reluctant to provide assistance but lends her his cell phone. Cassie calls Scott, her ex-husband, to come and help her save Morgan. She tells him the name of the housing development, but hangs up to talk with Sheriff Coburn, who has arrived. Cassie takes him back to the house and Coburn forces his way in. Coburn is sprayed in the face with pepper spray and fatally shoots the unseen attacker, revealed to be an elderly woman and the wrong house. Sonny arrives and shoots Coburn dead. He takes Cassie at gunpoint, revealing he watched them drive by and that he lives only a few houses over. Sonny forces Cassie and Morgan to bury Vikki, but Cassie manages to hit him with a shovel, allowing time to escape.

They find the keys to the elderly woman's vehicle. As they drive towards the gate, Sonny appears in the guard's uniform, his fourth kill of the day. Sonny shoots out the vehicle's tire, causing them to crash. Cassie and Morgan flee to the first house they find with lights on, but it is an abandoned house being used to grow marijuana.

Scott and his girlfriend Kelsey arrive at the guard shack and Sonny convinces them that he is the security guard. Sonny leads them through the neighborhood and tells Scott to shout for Cassie and Morgan. Still in the house, they hear Scott and Cassie runs out. Seeing Sonny, she shouts at Scott to run over the guard, but Sonny shoots Scott dead. Kelsey manages to back the car away, but crashes into and knocks down a light pole that knocks out the electricity to the marijuana house and ignites a brush fire. While trying to retrieve a gun from the trunk to kill Sonny, the fire reaches the car and she is killed in the ensuing explosion.

Sonny chases Cassie and Morgan back into the blacked-out house. Sonny finds them and – just as he is about to shoot Cassie – Morgan shines a flashlight in his face, allowing Cassie to stab him with a pair of gardening shears. Sonny pursues them and catches Cassie at the door of the unfinished basement. After a short struggle, Cassie pushes him in, and Sonny dies from the fall. Cassie and Morgan walk out of the development, shown burning as the various fires spread.

== Cast ==
- Danny McBride as Sonny
- Rosemarie DeWitt as Cassie Fowler
- Luke Wilson as Scott Fowler
- Elizabeth Gillies as Kelsey
- Kaitlin Olson as Vikki
- David Alan Grier as Coburn
- Lolli Sorenson as Morgan Fowler
- Seth Rogen as Gary (uncredited)

== Reception ==
On Rotten Tomatoes, the film holds an approval rating of 43% based on 37 reviews, with an average rating of 5.3/10. The site's critics consensus reads, "Arizona will provide twisted thrills and ludicrous drollery for Danny McBride diehards; everyone else may seek greener pastures." At Metacritic the film has a weighted average score of 41 out of 100, based on 11 critics, indicating "mixed or average" reviews.
