= Compliance (film) =

- Theatrical release poster
- Directed by: Craig Zobel
- Written by: Craig Zobel
- Produced by: Craig Zobel; Sophia Lin; Theo Sena; Lisa Muskat; Tyler Davidson
- Starring: Ann Dowd; Dreama Walker; Pat Healy; Bill Camp
- Cinematography: Adam Stone
- Edited by: Jane Rizzo
- Music by: Heather McIntosh
- Production companies: Dogfish Pictures; Low Spark Films; Bad Cop / Bad Cop; Muskat Filmed Properties
- Distributed by: Magnolia Pictures
- Release dates: January 21, 2012 (Sundance); August 17, 2012
- Running time: 90 minutes
- Country: United States
- Language: English
- Box office: $592,116

Compliance is a 2012 American thriller film written and directed by Craig Zobel and starring Ann Dowd, Dreama Walker, Pat Healy, and Bill Camp. The plot of the movie is closely based upon the series of strip search phone call scams that took place in Mount Washington, Kentucky in 2004, although the names of the real-life figures were changed. In both the film and the real-life incident, a caller posing as a police officer convinced a restaurant manager and others to carry out unlawful and intrusive procedures on an innocent employee.

Compliance had its world premiere at the Sundance Film Festival on January 21, 2012, and was distributed by Magnolia Pictures for its general release on August 17, 2012. Dowd's performance as Sandra, the manager, won the National Board of Review Award for Best Supporting Actress.

== Plot ==
Sandra, manager of a ChickWich fast food restaurant, receives a call from someone identifying himself as Officer Daniels. He claims to be in contact with the regional manager about a customer who had money allegedly stolen by an employee that day. Daniels says that he will remain on the phone while Sandra detains the employee until the police arrive. Sandra identifies Becky as the suspect based on the description; Daniels confirms the name.

Sandra brings Becky to the restaurant office. Becky denies the theft. At Daniels' behest, Sandra searches Becky's pockets and purse and finds nothing. Telling her that the alternative is to have Becky go to jail, Daniels has her strip-search Becky in the presence of another employee, Marti. Daniels tells Sandra that he and other cops are searching Becky's home on suspicion that her brother is involved in drugs, and that Becky may be an accomplice. He has Sandra put Becky's clothes into a bag and take it to her car for inspection by the police.

Sandra insists she resume managing the restaurant as it is busy. After Daniels stipulates that a male employee watch Becky for "security reasons", another employee, Kevin, is brought in, but refuses to follow Daniels' instructions and leaves. Sandra's fiancé Van takes over; under pressure from Daniels over the beers he drank before driving to the restaurant, he has Becky perform nude jumping jacks, ostensibly to shake loose any contraband concealed in her body. After Becky protests, Daniels has Van spank her. Eventually, Becky is coerced into performing oral sex on Van. Van leaves guilt-ridden and is in turn replaced by the custodian, Harold, who is outraged by Daniels' instructions. Harold tells Sandra about Daniels' orders; she calls the regional manager, who tells her he has no idea about any investigation.

The police discover that a similar incident happened elsewhere. Daniels is identified by closed-circuit recordings and arrested; he is a family man working as a telemarketer. Becky meets an attorney to discuss options for suing Sandra. Sandra, now unemployed and no longer seeing Van, tells a journalist she is a blameless victim.

== Cast ==
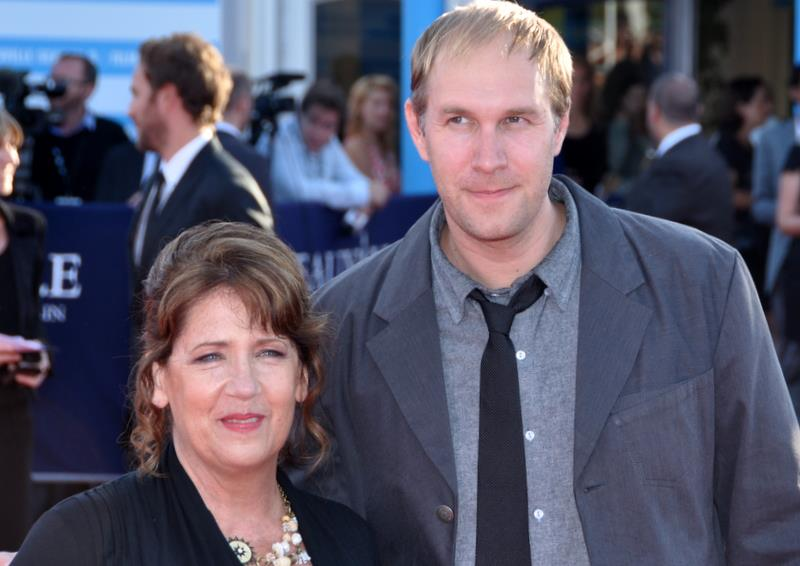
Star Ann Dowd and director Craig Zobel promoting the film at the 2012 Deauville American Film Festival.

- Ann Dowd as Sandra Frum (inspired by Donna Summers)
- Dreama Walker as Becky (inspired by Louise Ogborn)
- Pat Healy as The Caller / "Officer Daniels" (inspired by David Richard Stewart / "Officer Scott")
- Bill Camp as Van (inspired by Walter Nix, Jr.)
- Philip Ettinger as Kevin
- James McCaffrey as Detective Neals
- Ashlie Atkinson as Marti
- Stephen Payne as Harold
- Amelia Fowler as Brie
- Nikiya Mathis as Connie
- Rebecca Henderson as Lawyer

== Release ==
Compliance premiered at the 2012 Sundance Film Festival in January. The film received a limited release in the United States beginning August 17, 2012. It was released by Soda Pictures in the UK and Ireland on March 22, 2013.

== Reception ==
The film received generally positive reviews and Dowd's performance as the manipulated restaurant manager was met with critical acclaim, earning her the National Board of Review Award for Best Supporting Actress. The review aggregator website Rotten Tomatoes reports an 89% approval rating with an average rating of 7.5/10 based on 140 reviews. The website's consensus reads, "Anchored by smart, sensitive direction and strong performances, Compliance is a ripped-from-the-headlines thriller that's equal parts gripping and disturbing." On Metacritic, it has a score of 68 out of 100 based on 32 reviews, indicating "generally favorable" reviews.

At the premiere at the 2012 Sundance Film Festival, Compliance was met with controversy, as the audience's response included several walkouts and shouting matches during the film's question and answer session.

Roger Ebert of the Chicago Sun-Times gave the film three out of four stars and wrote, "Compliance encourages us to feel superior to the employees of a fast-food chicken chain in Ohio, and so we do: Audiences are said to be outraged at what the characters do, and San Francisco-based critic Omar Moore went back to more screenings to confirm that there were walk-outs. In the case of Compliance, the walk-outs aren't because it's a bad movie, but because it's all too effective at exposing the human tendency to cave in to authority."

== See also ==
- Compliance (psychology)
- Stanford prison experiment
- Asch conformity experiments
- Milgram experiment
