= Manglehorn =

2014 film

- Theatrical release poster
- Directed by: David Gordon Green
- Written by: Paul Logan
- Produced by: Lisa Muskat; David Gordon Green; Derrick Tseng; Christopher Woodrow; Molly Conners
- Starring: Al Pacino; Holly Hunter; Harmony Korine; Chris Messina
- Cinematography: Tim Orr
- Edited by: Colin Patton
- Music by: Explosions in the Sky; David Wingo
- Production companies: Worldview Entertainment; Rough House Pictures
- Distributed by: IFC Films
- Release dates: August 30, 2014 (Venice); June 19, 2015 (United States)
- Running time: 97 minutes
- Country: United States
- Language: English
- Budget: $4 million
- Box office: $459,636

Manglehorn is a 2014 American drama film directed by David Gordon Green and written by Paul Logan. The film stars Al Pacino, Holly Hunter, Harmony Korine and Chris Messina. It was selected to compete for the Golden Lion at the 71st Venice International Film Festival. The film was released in theaters by IFC Films on June 19, 2015.

== Plot ==
A.J. Manglehorn is a reclusive Texas locksmith who spends his days caring for his cat, finding comfort in his work, and lamenting a long-lost love. Enter kind-hearted bank teller Dawn, whose interest in the eccentric Manglehorn may just be able to draw him out of his shell.

== Cast ==
- Al Pacino as A.J. Manglehorn
- Holly Hunter as Dawn
- Harmony Korine as Gary
- Chris Messina as Jacob
- Marisa Varela as Patricia
- Skylar Gasper as Kylie

== Production ==
Principal photography began on November 4, 2013, in Austin, Texas, and filming lasted for twenty-five days at different locations in the city. The film was scored by Austin post-rock band Explosions in the Sky and David Wingo.

== Release ==
The film premiered in competition at the 71st Venice International Film Festival. It was also screened in the "Special Presentations" section at the 2014 Toronto International Film Festival. It was released in theaters on June 19, 2015, by IFC Films.

== Reception ==
Manglehorn received mixed reviews from critics. On Rotten Tomatoes, the film has a rating of 50%, based on 84 reviews, with a rating of 5.4/10. The consensus reads: "Manglehorn boasts a nicely understated performance from Al Pacino, but that isn't enough to compensate for a slight story and uneven script." On Metacritic, the film has a score of 56 out of 100, based on reviews from 26 critics, indicating "mixed or average" reviews.
