= Booger Red =

- Directed by: Berndt Mader
- Written by: Johnny McAllister; Berndt Mader
- Produced by: Berndt Mader
- Starring: Onur Turkel; Marija Karan
- Release date: October 2015 (Austin Film Festival)
- Running time: 96 minutes
- Country: United States
- Language: English

Booger Red is a 2015 film directed by Berndt Mader and written by Mader and Johnny McAllister. It premiered in the Spirit Theater in the Bob Bullock Museum, as part of the Austin Film Festival, in 2015.

The film documents a journalist named Onur Turkel, played by Onur Turkel, who had experienced child abuse in his past, investigating a possibly fabricated child abuse case. Its basis is a 2009 magazine article by Michael Hall, a journalist of the Texas Monthly who investigated the controversial "Mineola Swingers' Club" case in Mineola, Texas. Mader stated that he chose to make a film on the subject because "It was all just so outrageous, wild and surreal that I just had to look into it further."

The main character, Turkel, is intended to be an audience surrogate. Mader stated that he chose the actor Turkel as he could portray a "maniac". Hall stated that the main character is "a fornicating, drug-snorting, bearded wild man who bears absolutely no resemblance to me." The main character's sister-in-law, played by Marija Karan, is his main ally.

Caitlin Moore of the Austin Chronicle wrote that "is stylistically inspired by Abbas Kiarostami's Close-Up".
