= Dayveon =

- Theatrical release poster
- Directed by: Amman Abbasi
- Written by: Amman Abbasi; Steven Reneau
- Produced by: Amman Abbasi; Lachion Buckingham; Alexander Uhlmann
- Starring: Devin Blackmon; Dontrell Bright; Lachion Buckingham; Kordell Johnson; Marquell Manning; Chasity Moore
- Cinematography: Dustin Lane
- Edited by: Michael Carter; Dominic LaPerriere
- Music by: Amman Abbasi
- Production companies: Mama Bear Studios; Meridian Entertainment; Muskat Filmed Properties; Rough House Pictures; Salem Street Entertainment; Symbolic Exchange
- Distributed by: FilmRise
- Release dates: January 19, 2017 (Sundance Film Festival); September 13, 2017 (United States)
- Running time: 75 minutes
- Country: United States
- Language: English

Dayveon is a 2017 American drama film directed by Amman Abbasi and written by Amman Abbasi and Steven Reneau. The film stars Devin Blackmon, Dontrell Bright, Lachion Buckingham, Kordell Johnson, Marquell Manning and Chasity Moore. The film was released on September 13, 2017, by FilmRise.

== Plot ==
Dayveon (Devin Blackmon) is a 13-year-old struggling to cope with the death of his brother. In the sweltering Arkansas heat, Dayveon roams the street and begins to spend time with a local gang. Although his sister's boyfriend reluctantly serves as a father figure and attempts to provide support and security, Dayveon is constantly drawn towards the violence and camaraderie of his new world.

== Cast ==
- Devin Blackmon as Dayveon
- Dontrell Bright as Brian
- Lachion Buckingham as Mook
- Kordell Johnson as Brayden
- Marquell Manning as Country
- Chasity Moore as Kim
- Shavidee Trotter as Show D

== Release ==
The film premiered at the 2017 Sundance Film Festival on January 19, 2017. On January 25, 2017, FilmRise acquired distribution rights to the film. The film was released on September 13, 2017, by FilmRise.

== See also ==
- List of black films of the 2010s
- List of hood films
