= Joseph Stephens =

American songwriter

Joseph Stephens is an American multi-instrumentalist, film score composer, and songwriter. He composed music for the television show The Righteous Gemstones, the film Observe and Report, directed by Jody Hill as well as the HBO series Eastbound & Down, produced by Will Ferrell and Adam McKay’s Gary Sanchez Productions.

Stephens is also a founding member of the band Pyramid, which provided the score for Hill’s feature film debut, The Foot Fist Way. Pyramid also co-composed Shotgun Stories, from director Jeff Nichols, and composed additional music for Craig Zobel’s Great World of Sound. Additionally, Stephens contributed original Pyramid songs to two David Gordon Green films; the Sundance Film Festival Special Jury Prize-winning All the Real Girls and the critically acclaimed Undertow.

Stephens is also a member of the band City Wolf, which covered the classic Pixies’ song “Where Is My Mind?” for Observe and Report.

== Selected filmography ==
- 2020: Never Have I Ever - Season 1 - Composer
- 2020: Upload - Season 1 - Composer
- 2020: Don't Tell a Soul - Composer
- 2019: The Righteous Gemstones Season 1 - Composer
- 2019: The Last O.G. Season 2 - Composer
- 2019: Under the Eiffel Tower - Composer
- 2018: The Take Off - Composer
- 2018: The Last O.G. Season 1 - Composer
- 2018: The Legacy of a Whitetail Deer Hunter - Composer
- 2018: Arizona - Composer
- 2017: Flower - Composer
- 2017: Vice Principals Season 2 - Composer
- 2017: Shut Eye Season 2 - Composer
- 2016: Vice Principals Season 1 - Composer
- 2014: Rat Pack Rat - Composer
- 2013: Eastbound & Down Season 4 - Composer
- 2012: See Girl Run - Composer
- 2012: Eastbound & Down Season 3 - Composer
- 2011: The Catechism Cataclysm - Composer
- 2010: Eastbound & Down Season 2 - Composer
- 2009: Observe and Report - Composer
- 2009: Eastbound & Down - Composer
- 2007: Great World of Sound - Additional music by Pyramid
- 2006: The Foot Fist Way - Music by Pyramid
- 2004: Undertow - Contributed song "Monster In The Canyon"
- 2003: All the Real Girls - Contributed songs "Streets Were Raining" and "Body On Fire"
