= Pyramid (band) =

American experimental indie rock band

Pyramid is an American experimental, indie-rock band from North Carolina. Their first album The First American was released in 2005. Music from the album was used in two David Gordon Green films, All the Real Girls and Undertow. Pyramid also composed the music for Jody Hill's The Foot Fist Way, co-composed Shotgun Stories for Jeff Nichols, and added additional score to Craig Zobel's Great World of Sound.

== Discography ==
- The First American (2005)
- The First American B-sides (2007)
- Small Arms (2010)

== Soundtracks ==
- All the Real Girls (2003)
- Undertow (2004)
- The Foot Fist Way (2008)
- Shotgun Stories (2007)
- Observe and Report (2009)
- We Are Your Friends (film) (2015)

== Band members ==
- Joseph Stephens
- Ben Best
- Chris Walldorf
- Tyler Baum
- Ryan Blaine
- Ben Kennedy
- Brent Bagwell
- Kris Baucom
