= Danny McBride =

American actor and comedian (born 1976)

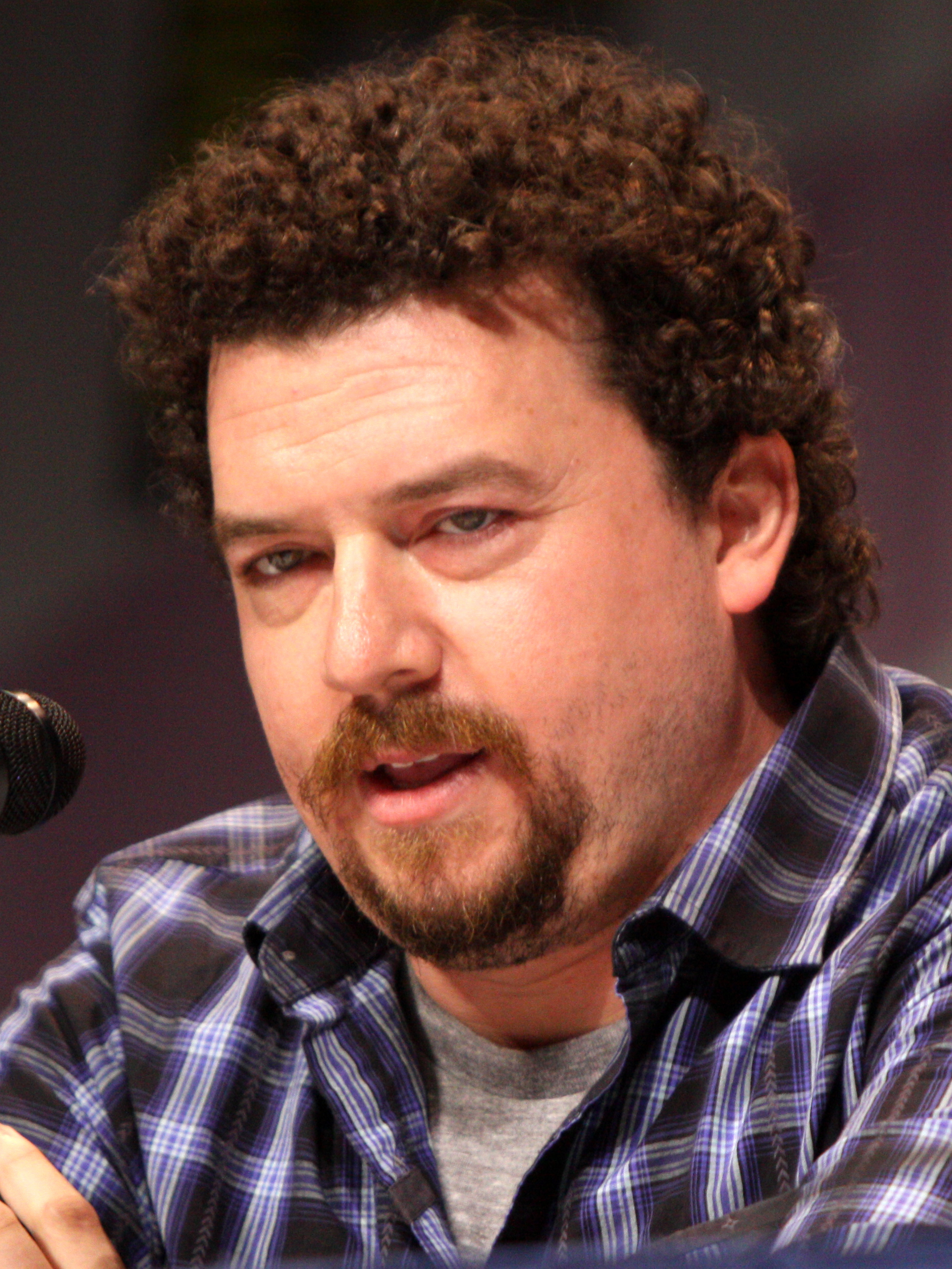
- McBride at Wondercon 2013
- Born: Daniel Richard McBride; December 29, 1976 (age 49); Statesboro, Georgia, U.S.
- Education: University of North Carolina School of the Arts (BFA)
- Occupations: Actor; comedian; writer; producer
- Years active: 2003–present
- Spouse: Gia Ruiz (m. 2010)
- Children: 2

Daniel Richard McBride (born December 29, 1976) is an American actor, comedian, screenwriter, director and producer. Known for his unique acting and writing style, the accolades he has received include nominations for a Primetime Emmy Award and four Satellite Awards.

McBride made his film debut with a supporting role in the romantic drama All the Real Girls (2003), which was directed and written by his later longtime collaborator David Gordon Green. After his first starring role in a film with The Foot Fist Way (2006), McBride gained mainstream recognition with starring roles in comedy films such as Hot Rod (2007), Pineapple Express (2008), and Tropic Thunder (2008). He had his breakout with a lead role as Kenny Powers on the HBO television series Eastbound & Down (2009–2013), which he also co-created with frequent collaborator Jody Hill. Following Eastbound & Down, McBride also starred in the films Land of the Lost (2009) and Up in the Air (2009).

In the 2010s, McBride starred in the comedy films Your Highness (2011), 30 Minutes or Less (2011), This Is the End (2013), and Aloha (2015), and had a main role as Neal Gamby on the HBO dark comedy series Vice Principals (2016–2017), which he co-created with Hill. McBride had starring voice roles in the animated feature films Despicable Me (2010), Kung Fu Panda 2 (2011), The Angry Birds Movie (2016), Sausage Party (2016), and The Angry Birds Movie 2 (2019), and played against type with starring roles in the drama film As I Lay Dying (2013) and the science fiction horror film Alien: Covenant (2017). He also provided the voice of Duane Earl, the fictional host of a conservative radio talk show in the video game Grand Theft Auto V (2013). In the late 2010s, he created and starred as Jesse Gemstone on the HBO series The Righteous Gemstones (2019–2025).

Outside of acting in and creating comedic works, McBride was a writer for Blumhouse Productions' Halloween film trilogy (2018–2022) and co-wrote the story for the supernatural horror film The Exorcist: Believer (2023). As an executive producer for the HBO true crime documentary series Telemarketers (2023), he was nominated for the Primetime Emmy Award for Outstanding Documentary or Nonfiction Series.

== Early life ==
McBride was born in Statesboro, Georgia. His mother, Kathy Rudy, and his stepfather both work at Marine Corps Base Quantico, as civilian support. McBride has Irish, Scottish, English and Jewish ancestry, with Catholic ancestors from Ulster who immigrated to Virginia in the 1870s. He was raised Baptist and has said, "church was very much part of my life when I was a kid. My parents were really involved and went all the time." His mother performed sermons in church using puppets, and McBride stated that his "interest in telling stories comes from her." He was raised in Spotsylvania County, Virginia, where he graduated from Courtland High School. He attended University of North Carolina School of the Arts in Winston-Salem, North Carolina, and became one of the "Three Flavas" along with director Jody Hill and Kris Baucom.

== Career ==
McBride was a second unit director for David Gordon Green's feature film debut George Washington, released in 2000. McBride made his acting debut in 2003, appearing in a supporting role in Green's second film All the Real Girls.

In 2006, McBride played Fred Simmons in the low-budget comedy film The Foot Fist Way, which he co-wrote with collaborators Jody Hill and Ben Best. His character later appeared in Late Night with Conan O'Brien on February 26, 2008. McBride wrote and starred in the HBO original comedy series Eastbound & Down (also a collaboration with Hill and Best), as Kenny Powers, a washed-up former major league baseball pitcher with anger management issues. The series was produced by Gary Sanchez Productions, and the pilot episode premiered in February 2009, featuring Will Ferrell and Craig Robinson.

HBO renewed the series for a second season in April 2009, and a fourth in July 2012. The series ended in November 2013. In March 2009, because of his role as Powers, he received an offer to play semi-professional baseball from the Pensacola Pelicans, a team in the American Association of Independent Professional Baseball.

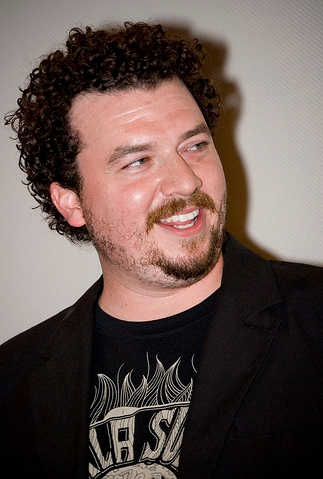
McBride in 2009 promoting the film Observe and Report

In 2010, he signed an endorsement deal with K-Swiss shoes. He played the eponymous roadie in the Tenacious D music video for "Roadie" in 2012. McBride co-created and co-starred in the HBO comedy series Vice Principals from 2016 to 2017.

McBride voiced Duane Earl, a fictional talk radio host in the 2013 video game Grand Theft Auto V. Earl is the host of Beyond Insemination, a satirical show where he converses with callers.

In 2017, McBride appeared in the prequel film Alien: Covenant, alongside Katherine Waterston, Michael Fassbender and Billy Crudup. McBride told Vanity Fair in an interview that he was both surprised and glad for the opportunity to be involved with the Alien movie since he had been a longtime fan of the franchise.

In January 2018, two trailers were released online for what was supposedly a Crocodile Dundee sequel, titled Dundee: The Son of a Legend Returns Home, and purportedly starring McBride as Brian Dundee, the son of the original Crocodile Dundee. The trailers feature cameo appearances by Australian actors Chris Hemsworth, Hugh Jackman, Russell Crowe, Margot Robbie and Ruby Rose. From the beginning, various aspects of the campaign made some publications believe that film was an elaborate hoax. It was later reported that these ads were actually part of a lead-up to a Super Bowl commercial for Tourism Australia.

McBride served as an executive producer and co-writer for the films Halloween (2018), Halloween Kills (2021) and Halloween Ends (2022), which served as one of the final films for the franchise of the same name. The sequel trilogy is directed and written by Green and produced by Jason Blum.

Since 2018, McBride has been the face of bookmaker Coral's television commercials in the United Kingdom, playing a character called "Sports Rodstein", described as "the world's biggest sports fan (although not the savviest)".

In late 2018, HBO ordered The Righteous Gemstones, from McBride and his Rough House Pictures label, straight to series. The series also stars John Goodman, Adam Devine and Edi Patterson. It follows a world-famous televangelist family with a long tradition of deviance, greed, and charitable work.

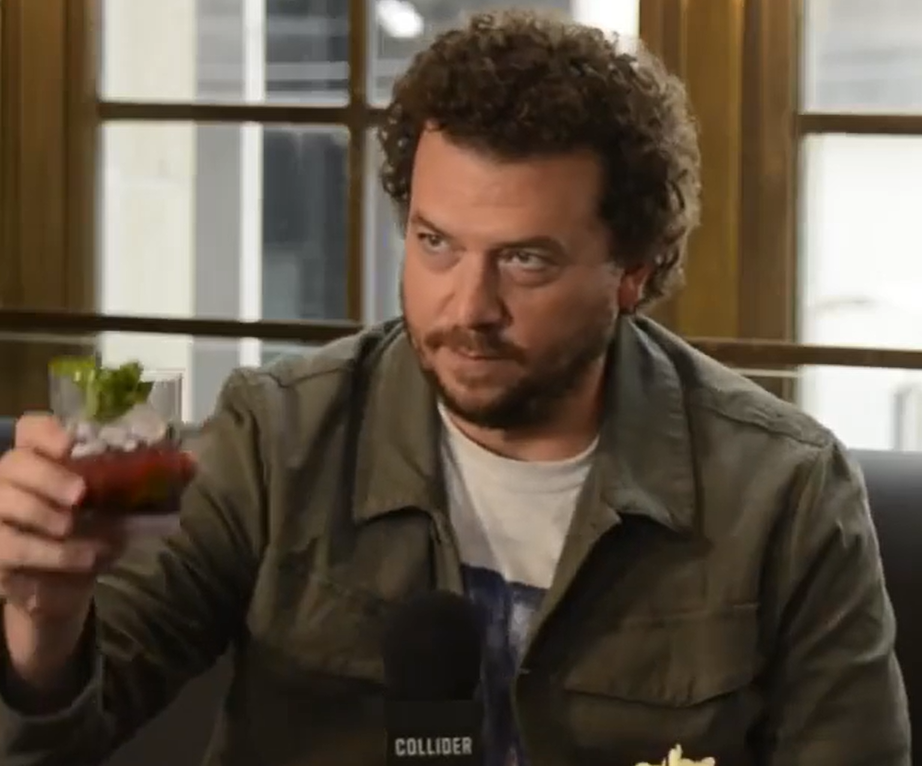
McBride celebrating at TIFF 2018

In 2021, McBride voiced Rick Mitchell in the Sony Pictures Animation film The Mitchells vs. the Machines. In 2026, McBride published a collection of short stories titled Thrilling Tales of Modern Men that explores masculinity.

McBride will make his feature directorial debut with a film based on the G.I. Joe franchise, for which he will also pen the script with The Righteous Gemstones collaborators Jeff Fradley and John Carcieri.

== Personal life ==
McBride married art director Gia Ruiz in 2010. They have a son and a daughter.

== Filmography ==
=== Film ===
Year	Title	Actor	Writer	Executive producer	Director	Role	Notes
2000	George Washington	No	No	No	2nd unit	—N/a	
2003	All the Real Girls	Yes	No	No	No	Bust-Ass	
2006	The Foot Fist Way	Yes	Yes	No	No	Fred Simmons	
2007	Hot Rod	Yes	No	No	No	Rico Brown	
2007	Superbad	Uncredited	No	No	No	Buddy at Party	
2007	The Heartbreak Kid	Yes	No	No	No	Martin	
2008	Drillbit Taylor	Yes	No	No	No	Don Armstrong	
2008	Pineapple Express	Yes	No	No	No	Red	
2008	Tropic Thunder	Yes	No	No	No	Cody Underwood	
2009	Fanboys	Uncredited	No	No	No	Head of Security	
2009	Observe and Report	Yes	No	No	No	Caucasian Crackhead	
2009	Land of the Lost	Yes	No	No	No	Will Stanton	
2009	Up in the Air	Yes	No	No	No	Jim Miller	
2010	Despicable Me	Yes	No	No	No	Fred McDade (voice)	
2010	Due Date	Yes	No	No	No	Lonnie	
2011	Your Highness	Yes	Yes	Yes	No	Thadeous	
2011	Fight for Your Right Revisited	Yes	No	No	No	MCA	Short film
2011	Kung Fu Panda 2	Yes	No	No	No	Wolf Boss (voice)	
2011	30 Minutes or Less	Yes	No	No	No	Dwayne King	
2011	The Catechism Cataclysm	No	No	Yes	No	—N/a	Producer
2012	The Comedy	No	No	Yes	No	—N/a	
2013	As I Lay Dying	Yes	No	No	No	Vernon Tull	
2013	This Is the End	Yes	No	No	No	Himself	
2013	Prince Avalanche	No	No	Yes	No	—N/a	
2013	Joe	No	No	Yes	No	—N/a	
2013	Manglehorn	No	No	Yes	No	—N/a	
2014	The Sound and the Fury	Yes	No	No	No	Police Sheriff	
2014	Don Verdean	Yes	No	No	No	Tony Lazarus	
2015	Aloha	Yes	No	No	No	Colonel Lacy	
2015	Hell and Back	Yes	No	No	No	Orpheus (voice)	
2015	Rock the Kasbah	Yes	No	No	No	Nick	
2015	The D Train	No	No	Yes	No	—N/a	
2016	The Angry Birds Movie	Yes	No	No	No	Bomb (voice)	
2016	Sausage Party	Yes	No	No	No	Honey Mustard (voice)	
2016	In Dubious Battle	Yes	No	No	No	Tramp	
2016	Donald Cried	No	No	Yes	No	—N/a	
2016	Masterminds	No	No	Yes	No	—N/a	
2017	Alien: Covenant - Prologue: Last Supper	Yes	No	No	No	Tennessee Faris	Short film
2017	Alien: Covenant	Yes	No	No	No	Tennessee Faris	
2017	The Disaster Artist	Yes	No	No	No	Himself	
2017	Dayveon	No	No	Yes	No	—N/a	
2017	Flower	No	No	Yes	No	—N/a	
2018	Arizona	Yes	No	No	No	Sonny	Also producer
2018	The Legacy of a Whitetail Deer Hunter	Yes	Yes	Yes	No	Don	
2018	Halloween	No	Yes	Yes	No	—N/a	
2019	The Angry Birds Movie 2	Yes	No	No	No	Bomb (voice)	
2019	Zeroville	Yes	No	No	No	Financier	
2020	Fatman	No	No	Yes	No	—N/a	
2021	The Mitchells vs. the Machines	Yes	No	No	No	Rick Mitchell (voice)	
2021	Halloween Kills	No	Yes	Yes	No	—N/a	
2022	Halloween Ends	No	Yes	Yes	No	—N/a	
2023	The Exorcist: Believer	No	Story	Yes	No	—N/a	
2026	The Angry Birds Movie 3	Yes	No	No	No	Bomb (voice)	
2028	Untitled G.I. Joe movie †	TBA	Yes	TBA	Yes	—N/a	Pre-production

=== Television ===
Year	Title	Actor	Director	Writer	Executive Producer	Creator	Role	Notes
2009–2013	Eastbound & Down	Yes	No	Yes	Yes	Yes	Kenny Powers	29 episodes
2011	Good Vibes	Yes	No	No	No	No	Voneeta Teets (voice)	12 episodes
2013	Clear History	Yes	No	No	No	No	Frank	Television film
2014	Chozen	Yes	No	No	Yes	No	Jimmy (voice)	8 episodes
2016	Animals	Yes	No	No	No	No	Gregory (voice)	Episode: "Turkeys"
2016–2017	Vice Principals	Yes	Yes	Yes	Yes	Yes	Neal Gamby	18 episodes and directed 2 episodes
2019–2025	The Righteous Gemstones	Yes	Yes	Yes	Yes	Yes	Jesse Gemstone	36 episodes and directed 7 episodes
2023	Telemarketers	No	No	No	Executive	No	—N/a	

=== Music videos ===
Year	Title	Artist(s)	Role	Notes
2011	"Make Some Noise"	The Beastie Boys	MCA	
2012	"Roadie"	Tenacious D	Sebastian / "The Roadie"	
2013	"YOLO"	The Lonely Island featuring Adam Levine and Kendrick Lamar	Drug dealer	Cameo

=== Video games ===
Year	Title	Role	Notes	Ref.
2013	Grand Theft Auto V	Duane Earl	Voice role	

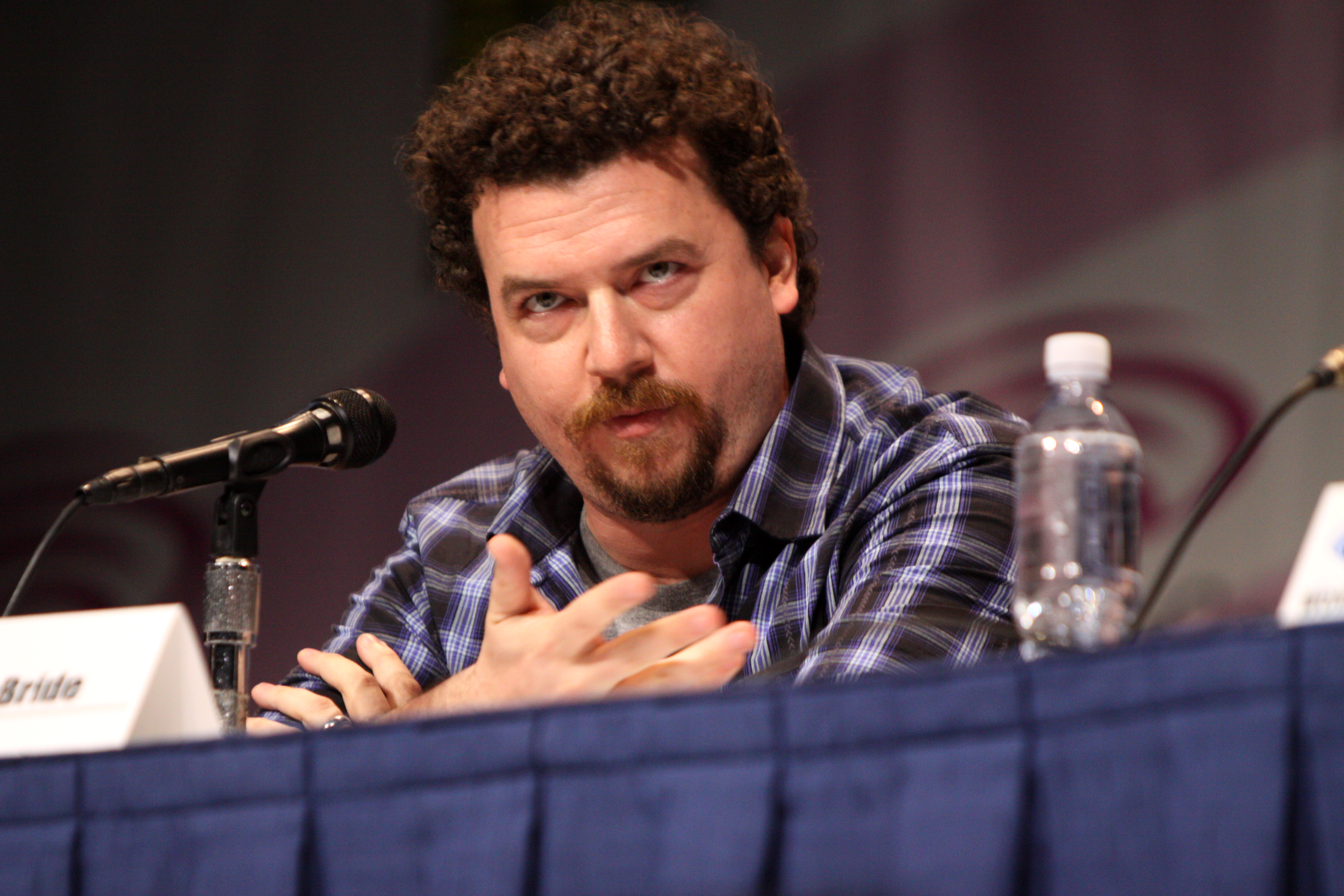
McBride at the 2013 WonderCon, Anaheim, California

=== Awards and nominations ===
Year	Award	Category	Nominated work	Result
2008	Austin Film Critics Association	Breakthrough Artist Award	Pineapple Express, The Foot Fist Way, Tropic Thunder	Won
2008	Detroit Film Critics Society	Best Newcomer	Pineapple Express	Nominated
2009	MTV Movie & TV Awards	Best Fight (shared with James Franco and Seth Rogen)	Pineapple Express	Nominated
2009	Satellite Awards	Best Actor – Television Series Musical or Comedy	Eastbound & Down	Nominated
2009	Teen Choice Awards	Choice TV: Male Breakout Star	Eastbound & Down	Nominated
2009	Washington D.C. Area Film Critics Association	Best Ensemble	Up in the Air	Nominated
2009	Awards Circuit Community Awards	Best Cast Ensemble	Up in the Air	Nominated
2010	Satellite Awards	Best Actor – Television Series Musical or Comedy	Eastbound & Down	Nominated
2010	Writers Guild of America	Episodic Comedy	Eastbound & Down	Nominated
2010	Central Ohio Film Critics Association	Best Ensemble	Up in the Air	Nominated
2010	Denver Film Critics Society	Best Acting Ensemble	Up in the Air	Nominated
2010	Gold Derby Awards	Ensemble Cast	Up in the Air	Nominated
2014	American Comedy Awards	Comedy Supporting Actor – Film	This is the End	Nominated
2014	MTV Movie & TV Awards	Best WTF Moment (shared with Channing Tatum)	This is the End	Nominated
2016	SXSW Film Festival	Episodic	Vice Principals	Won
2016	Behind the Voice Actors Awards	Best Vocal Ensemble in a Feature Film	Hell and Back	Nominated
2017	The BAM Awards	Best Cast	The Disaster Artist	Nominated
2018	Fright Meter Awards	Best Screenplay	Halloween	Nominated
2019	Satellite Awards	Best Actor – Television Series Musical or Comedy	The Righteous Gemstones	Nominated
2019	IGN Summer Movie Awards	Best TV Ensemble	The Righteous Gemstones	Nominated
2019	Hollywood Music in Media Awards	Best Original Song – TV Show/Limited Series	The Righteous Gemstones	Nominated
2019	North Carolina Film Critics Association	Tar Heel Award	Halloween	Nominated
2022	Austin Film Critics Association	Best Voice Acting/Animated/Digital Performance	The Mitchells vs. the Machines	Nominated
2022	North Carolina Film Critics Association	Best Vocal Performance in Animation or Mixed Media	The Mitchells vs. the Machines	Nominated
2022	Hawaii Film Critics Society	Best Vocal/Motion Capture Performance	The Mitchells vs. the Machines	Nominated
2022	Hollywood Critics Association Television Awards	Best Writing in a Broadcast Network or Cable Series – Comedy	The Righteous Gemstones	Nominated
2022	Hollywood Critics Association Television Awards	Best Directing in a Broadcast Network or Cable Series – Comedy	The Righteous Gemstones	Nominated
2023	Satellite Awards	Best Actor – Television Series Musical or Comedy	The Righteous Gemstones	Nominated
2023	Gotham Awards	Breakthrough Series – Over 40 Minutes	Telemarketers	Nominated
2024	International Documentary Association	Best Episodic Series	Telemarketers	Nominated
2024	Primetime Emmy Awards	Outstanding Documentary or Nonfiction Series	Telemarketers	Nominated
