= Second unit =

Filmmaking team

A second unit is a discrete team of filmmakers tasked with filming shots or sequences of a production, separate from the main or "first" unit. The second unit often shoots simultaneously with the other unit or units, allowing the filming stage of production to be completed faster.

== Function ==
The functions of the second unit vary, but typically the first unit films the key face-to-face drama between the principal actors. Two frequent ways a second unit is used are:

- Action sequences: Action sequences are often filmed in discrete locations, using stunt performers rather than the principal cast, and requiring significantly different filming arrangements than ordinary scenes. Therefore, they are an opportunity for second-unit shooting.
- "Pick-ups": After the main unit has finished on a set or location, there may be shots that require some or all of this setting as background but that do not require the principal actors. The shots may include close-ups, inserts, cutaways, and establishing shots.

In both of these scenarios, the purpose of the second unit is to make the most efficient use of some of the resources that are expensive or scarce in film production: actors' and directors' shooting time, sound stage usage, and the cost of sets which may have been built on stages.

The work of second units should not be confused with multiple-camera setups, where several cameras film the same scene simultaneously. Large productions may have multiple second units. Although filmmakers may refer to having "three or four units working", each unit would be called an "additional second unit"; usually, none would be described as the third or fourth unit.

== Directors ==
The second unit has its own director and cinematographer. A key skill for a second unit director is to follow the style set by the film's primary director. Peter MacDonald, who has directed second unit on multiple films, has said, "The most important thing about any second unit is that you can't tell the difference between the second unit and the first unit. It must have the stamp of the first unit, both in photography and the style of direction... You try to copy what the first unit does as much as possible. You mustn't be on an ego trip and try to do your own style, because your material has to cut into theirs and it mustn't jar, it must fit in exactly so no-one can tell the difference." Brett Ratner, commenting about Conrad E. Palmisano, who directed second unit for him on multiple occasions said, "He has the understanding of what it takes to create a great action sequence and never deviate from the story or the tone of the film."

Occasionally, some second unit directors work with certain directors on several projects like Allan L. Graf, who directed second unit for Walter Hill on several of his films, as well as Eric B. Schwab working with Brian De Palma on his films. Certain films also may have more than one second unit director. Examples include The Departed, Superman Returns, The Expendables, Spider-Man, Spider-Man 2, Spider-Man 3, X-Men: The Last Stand, X-Men: First Class, Captain America: Civil War, Blade: Trinity, Transformers: The Last Knight, Cowboys & Aliens, Minority Report, and Bad Boys For Life.

Christopher Nolan, Quentin Tarantino, Paul Thomas Anderson, Mike Judge, and Stephen Hopkins are among directors who do not use second units in their films. Sometimes, if a film has no second unit, another person will only direct a sequence. An example is Robert Shaye, who directed the melting staircase sequence of Wes Craven’s A Nightmare on Elm Street, which he produced, as well as having two uncredited voice roles as the television newsreader and the KRGR radio broadcaster. Occasionally, there is an uncredited co-director on a project, for example in Up in Smoke, where Tommy Chong, in addition to co-writing and co-starring in the film, co-directed the film uncredited alongside Lou Adler. That also happened with George Lucas, who directed the Vietnam War scenes in More American Graffiti for Bill L. Norton and directed reshoots on Red Tails for Anthony Hemingway, in addition to serving as executive producer. Sometimes, actors get a start serving as second unit director, like Danny McBride, who served as second unit director for David Gordon Green on George Washington, before making his acting debut in Green’s next film, All the Real Girls.

There have been times when the stunt coordinator is not the second unit director. An example is John A. Stoneham, Jr. He served as stunt coordinator on Four Brothers, Shooter, Dawn of the Dead, and Total Recall, but Doug R. Coleman, Jeff Habberstad, Clay Staub, and Spiro Razatos respectively, directed second unit as opposed to Stoneham, Jr. Stoneham, Jr. served as stunt coordinator on Mean Girls, Bridesmaids, and Super 8, but no second unit was used during the filming on any of the three films.

Because second units often film scenes with stunts and special effects in action movies, the jobs of stunt coordinator and visual effects supervisor often get combined with that of the second unit director. Unlike an assistant director, who is second-in-command to the main director, a second unit director operates independently. Thus working as a second unit director can be a stepping stone for aspiring directors to gain experience. Other times, directors may return to predominantly working as second unit directors for the remainder of their career.
