= Collette Wolfe =

American actress

- Occupation: Actress
- Years active: 2006–present
- Spouse(s): Jody Hill (m. 2012; div. 2013)
- Children: 1

Collette Wolfe is an American actress known for her roles in films including Observe and Report (2009), Hot Tub Time Machine (2010), and Young Adult (2011).

== Early life ==
Wolfe was raised in Virginia, where she was the King George Fall Festival Pageant Queen of 1997. She graduated from King George High School and later attended Virginia Tech.

== Career ==
Wolfe made her film debut in The Foot Fist Way (2006). She later starred as Nell in Observe and Report (2009). In September 2009, she was cast as Jill in the short-lived NBC sitcom 100 Questions, succeeding Joy Suprano, who played the role in the pilot episode. She had a recurring role in the ABC series Cougar Town. In 2011, she signed up for the NBC pilot Lovelives, but the series was not picked up. She co-starred in the never-aired 2013 mid-season replacement (four episodes filmed) Next Caller. In June 2015, she was cast in the recurring role of improv teacher Dorothy Durwood in the FXX sitcom You're the Worst. In 2016, she was cast in a recurring role on TNT's Good Behavior.

== Personal life ==
Wolfe was in a long-term relationship with writer-director Jody Hill, and appeared in his films Observe and Report and The Foot Fist Way. They married in 2012 in Cabo San Lucas, but divorced in 2013. In 2021, Wolfe announced the birth of her son on Instagram.

== Filmography ==
=== Film ===
Year	Title	Role	Notes
2006	The Foot Fist Way	Denise	
2007	Great World of Sound	Airline Employee	
2007	The Wager	Reporter #4	
2008	Semi-Pro	Melinda	
2008	Four Christmases	Cindy	
2009	17 Again	Wendy	
2009	Observe and Report	Nell	
2010	Hot Tub Time Machine	Kelly Yates	
2010	The Etiquette Ninjas	-	Short
2011	Young Adult	Sandra Freehauf	
2012	The Babymakers	Allison	
2012	The Pilgrim & the Private Eye	Student Film Director	Short
2013	Devil's Knot	Glori Shettles	
2014	Play Nice	Raquel Jacobs	
2014	Interstellar	Ms. Hanley	
2015	Hot Tub Time Machine 2	Kelly Yates Dorchen	
2015	A Beautiful Now	Ella	
2016	Second Nature	Amanda Maxwell	

=== Television ===
Year	Title	Role	Notes
2009	Reaper	Olivia	Episode: "The Home Stretch"
2009	Greek	Kiki	Episode: "Dearly Beloved"
2010	How I Met Your Mother	Sarah	Episode: "Zoo or False"
2010	100 Questions	Jill	Main Cast
2010	Eastbound & Down	Home Buyer	Episode: "Chapter 13"
2010–11	Cougar Town	Kirsten	Recurring Cast: Season 2
2011	Traffic Light	Michelle	Episode: "All the Precedent's Men"
2011	Friends with Benefits	Megan Harriman	Episode: "The Benefit of Forgetting"
2012	Fetching	Liza	Main Cast
2013	The Office	Alice	Episode: "Moving On"
2013	Mad Men	Brenda	Episode: "Collaborators"
2013	Royal Pains	Greer	Episode: "Chock Full O' Nuts"
2013	Next Caller	Stella	Main Cast
2014	Things You Shouldn't Say Past Midnight	Nancy	Recurring Cast
2015	Your Family or Mine	Shawni Durnin	Recurring Cast
2015–16	You're the Worst	Dorothy Durwood	Recurring Cast: Season 2-3
2016–17	Good Behavior	Tiffany Dash	Recurring Cast: Season 1
2018	Grey's Anatomy	Karin Taylor	Episode: "Personal Jesus"
2018	A.P. Bio	Meredith	Recurring Cast: Season 1
2019	Shameless	Tessa	Episode: "Debbie Might Be A Prostitute"
2023	Quantum Leap	Margie Brandis	Episode: "Let Them Play"
