= Zene Baker =

American film editor

- Occupation: Film editor
- Years active: 1998–present

Zene Baker (/ˈziːn/ ZEEN) is an American film editor. A native of Raleigh, North Carolina, Baker is a 1998 graduate of The North Carolina School of the Arts where he received a Bachelor of Fine Arts in film editing. Baker is best known as the editor of Seth Rogen's films Observe and Report, 50/50, This Is the End, Neighbors, The Interview, The Night Before and Neighbors 2: Sorority Rising

In addition, Baker was also an editor on WandaVision, Thor: Ragnarok, and edited Seeking a Friend for the End of the World. He is currently represented by WME Agency https://www.wmeagency.com/expertise/production/ .

== Filmography ==
Year	Film	Director	Other notes
2000	George Washington	David Gordon Green	with Steven Gonzales
2002	Civil Brand	Neema Barnette	
2003	All the Real Girls	David Gordon Green	with Steven Gonzales
2004	Undertow	David Gordon Green	with Steven Gonzales
2006	The Foot Fist Way	Jody Hill	
2007	Shanghai Kiss	Kern Konwiser & David Ren	
2007	Ping Pong Playa	Jessica Yu	
2007	The Babysitters	David Ross	
2008	The Haunting of Molly Hartley	Mickey Liddell	
2009	Brief Interviews with Hideous Men	John Krasinski	
2009	Observe and Report	Jody Hill	
2009	Greek	Several	3 episodes
2010	Yeardley	Heath C. Michaels	
2011	50/50	Jonathan Levine	
2012	Seeking a Friend for the End of the World	Lorene Scafaria	
2012	Five	Jennifer Aniston, Patty Jenkins, Alicia Keys, and Demi Moore	TV movie
2013	This Is the End	Seth Rogen and Evan Goldberg	
2014	Neighbors	Nicholas Stoller	
2014	The Interview	Seth Rogen and Evan Goldberg	
2015	The Night Before	Jonathan Levine	
2016	Neighbors 2: Sorority Rising	Nicholas Stoller	
2017	Snatched	Jonathan Levine	with Melissa Bretherton
2017	Thor: Ragnarok	Taika Waititi	with Joel Negron
2019	Men in Black: International	F. Gary Gray	with Christian Wagner
2021	WandaVision	Matt Shakman	with Tim Roche & Nona Khodai
2022	She-Hulk: Attorney at Law	Kat Coiro	with Jamie Gross & Stacey Schroeder
2026	Rolling Loud: The Movie	Jeremy Garelick	
