= Your Highness =

2011 film by David Gordon Green

- Theatrical release poster
- Directed by: David Gordon Green
- Written by: Danny McBride; Ben Best
- Produced by: Scott Stuber
- Starring: Danny McBride; James Franco; Natalie Portman; Zooey Deschanel; Justin Theroux; Toby Jones; Damian Lewis
- Cinematography: Tim Orr
- Edited by: Craig Alpert
- Music by: Steve Jablonsky
- Production companies: Stuber Pictures; Universal Pictures
- Distributed by: Universal Pictures
- Release date: April 8, 2011
- Running time: 102 minutes
- Country: United States
- Language: English
- Budget: $50 million
- Box office: $28 million

Your Highness is a 2011 American stoner comic fantasy film directed by David Gordon Green. It stars Danny McBride, James Franco, Natalie Portman, Zooey Deschanel, and Justin Theroux. Written by McBride and Ben Best, the film was released on April 8, 2011 by Universal Pictures. It follows an arrogant prince and his brother on a quest to stop a sorcerer, rescue the kidnapped princess, and save their father's kingdom. The film received negative reviews from critics and was a box office bomb, grossing $28 million worldwide against a $50 million budget.

== Plot ==
Thadeous and Fabious are sons of King Tallious in the Kingdom of Mourne. Fabious is dashing and skilled and Thadeous is lazy and ineffectual. While celebrating victory over the evil sorcerer, Leezar, who has been ravaging Tallious's kingdom, Fabious presents Princess Belladonna, whom he has freed from a tower and wishes to marry.

Though his brother makes him best man, Thadeous skips the wedding after overhearing Fabious' Knights Elite, led by Boremont, talk about him negatively. The wedding is then crashed by Leezar, who admits being the one who placed Belladonna in the tower. Leezar kidnaps her again and flees. Returning to the castle with his servant and best friend Courtney, Thadeous is given an ultimatum: join Fabious on his quest to rescue Belladonna or be banished.

Visiting the Great Wize Wizard, Thadeous and Fabious learn that Leezar's goal is to fulfill a prophecy: a warlock having sex with a virgin when the two moons converge, will impregnate her with a dragon that will allow him to take over King Tallious' kingdom. To destroy Leezar, they are given a magic compass that will lead them to the Blade of Unicorn, located within a labyrinth. On the way there, they learn Fabious's eunuch slave, Julie, has been informing Leezar of their progress and the Knights Elite are serving the warlock.

After the knights are killed and he escapes, Fabious sends his mechanical bird Simon to warn the king of the betrayal by the Knights Elite, requesting reinforcements. Thadeous, Fabious and Courtney are captured by wild women led by the savage warlord Marteetee, who imprisons them in an arena, where Fabious kills off Marteetee's finest warrior. In retaliation, Marteetee summons a hydra-like monster to kill them. The brothers are rescued by Isabel, a warrior seeking revenge for her father's murder at Marteetee's hands.

Later that night, Thadeous learns Isabel is also after Leezar to avenge the slaughter of her brothers. The next day, the party learns too late that Isabel stole the compass from Thadeous. Fabious, finally angered by his brother's selfishness, decides to find the Blade of Unicorn alone. Thadeous and Courtney go to a tavern, where they find Isabel and retrieve the compass. Finding that his brother has been captured by Leezar's men, Thadeous wins Isabel over as they join forces, entering the labyrinth where they encounter a Minotaur.

After becoming separated from the others, Thadeous retrieves the Blade of Unicorn and slays the Minotaur. Thadeous and his group make their way to Leezar's castle and free Fabious, giving him the Blade. As the others kill off Julie, Boremont and his men and Leezar's three witches, Fabious impales Leezar with the Blade of Unicorn, preventing him from raping Belladonna.

After their victory, Isabel leaves for another quest and the heroes return home. Some time later, Fabious and Belladonna marry, while Thadeous is approached by a returning Isabel, who reveals that she has fallen in love with him. However, for them to have sex, he must first slay the witch who has cast a spell on her, locking her in a chastity belt. Though not in the mood to go out, Isabel's suggestion convinces him to go on a new adventure.

== Cast ==
- Danny McBride as Prince Thadeous
- James Franco as Prince Fabious
- Natalie Portman as Princess Isabel
- Zooey Deschanel as Princess Belladonna
- Justin Theroux as Leezar
- Toby Jones as Julie
- Charles Dance as King Tallious
- Damian Lewis as Boremont
- Rasmus Hardiker as Courtney
- Simon Farnaby as Manious the Bold
- DeObia Oparei as Thundarian
- Matyelok Gibbs, Angela Pleasence, and Anna Barry as Helinda, Sariah, and Marlyne, Leezar's three Mothers
- John Fricker as Marteetee
- Kiran Shah as Tiniest One
- Caroline Grace-Cassidy as Handmaiden
- Rhian Sugden, Amii Grove and Madison Welch as Forest Women
- Iga Wyrwał as Regina
- Charles Shaughnessy as Narrator / Soul of the Maze

== Production ==
The film had been a passion project of David Gordon Green's for a long time, with him later calling it, "an entirely self-indulgent dream project for the 11-year-old in me." Although marketed as a spoof of '80s fantasy movies, Green has said that this was not his intent. Instead, he hoped to, with star Danny McBride, "put our stamp on it and bring our sensibility to it, but work within the genre." Early on, according to Green, Universal was nervous about the prospects of the film, believing it to be a parody. However, their minds were eased when discussing the casting, "and that we weren't filling it with comedian cameos." Filming began in the summer of 2009 in Northern Ireland, at historic locations such as Dunluce Castle, Cairncastle and Shane's Castle, and it concluded in October 2009.

Although Green wanted to make the film epic in scale, they were hampered by a limited budget. Ad libbing and improv were encouraged on set, although Green has implied that the extent of this has been exaggerated, adding, "There was definitely more of a script here than anything I've ever worked on". Still, at least one notable part of the backstory was improvised, which was the idea that the Wizard molested James Franco's character as a youth. McBride has said that he was certain that the scene where this was revealed would be cut, and he was shocked when it appeared in the final film. Much of the cast employed British-style accents despite the film's comedic fantasy setting, reflecting the longstanding convention of using British accents in medieval and fantasy-inspired productions.

== Music ==
The musical score for Your Highness was composed by Steve Jablonsky, conducted by Nick Glennie-Smith, performed by the Hollywood Studio Symphony, and released by Varèse Sarabande label on April 5, 2011.

== Marketing ==
A red-band trailer was released on IGN and Funny or Die. On December 21, 2010, a green-band trailer was released online, and shown before screenings of Little Fockers and The Dilemma.

On March 23, 2011, a second red-band trailer was released.

== Reception ==
=== Box office ===
Your Highness opened on April 8, 2011, in 2,772 theaters nationwide and made $9,360,020 in its opening weekend, ranking number six in the domestic box office. By the end of its run, the film had grossed $21,596,445 in the United States and Canada and $6,417,288 internationally for a worldwide total of $28,013,733.

=== Critical reception ===
Your Highness received negative reviews from critics. On Rotten Tomatoes, the film holds a rating of 27%, based on 182 reviews, with an average rating of 4.27/10. The site's critical consensus reads, "Big budgets and costumes in service of scatalogical jokes may seem funny on paper, but in execution this is a highly monotonous romp that registers only occasional laughs." On Metacritic, the film has a score of 31 out of 100, based on 33 critics, indicating "generally unfavorable reviews". Audiences polled by CinemaScore gave the film an average grade of "C+" on an A+ to F scale.

Roger Ebert gave the film one star out of four, calling it "juvenile excrescence that feels like the work of 11-year-old boys in love with dungeons, dragons, warrior women, pot, boobs and four-letter words," further stating, "that this is the work of David Gordon Green beggars the imagination." Entertainment Weekly gave it a C+, with Natalie Portman favorably reviewed as "fierce and funny as a babe warrior...good with dirty words". The L.A. Times noted that the lowbrow humor is "sometimes witless and sometimes winning comedy...begins with grade-school-level graffiti being scrawled across storybook pages and goes up and down from there. Still, the fun can be infectious...a farce within a farce...tawdry tale of the bothered and bewildered Kingdom of Mourne".

David Edelstein of New York magazine gave a favorable review, describing the film as "a cunning weave of low and high". Yahoo! described the "Raunchy Sex Comedy Wrapped Up in a Noble Quest" as "overall, sets and scenery were fantastic and photography was incredible...a awesome, piece of foolishness wrapped up as a Period Piece...more in common with American Pie than it did to Lord of the Rings. Richard Corliss, who admired McBride's and Green's earlier work, said he felt a "kind of head-swiveling awe in Your Highness's concentration of aimless inanity, in the purity of its devotion to its own louche principles. Like members of some post-Dadaist collective, the filmmakers have dedicated themselves to memorializing every first, wrong impulse that popped into their heads, while ruthlessly excising any vestige of wit or narrative niceties as being too linear, dude."

James Franco received a Razzie nomination for Worst Supporting Actor for the film, losing to Al Pacino in Jack and Jill.

James Franco would later poke fun at the film's poor reception during his Comedy Central Roast, saying, "I agreed to do this roast because I wanted to do something I've never done before — something that has zero artistic value, something nobody will remember three months from now, something that's offensive, homophobic, and stars horrifically untalented people, and something that's only a big deal to a handful of teenage stoners on Twitter. You might say, 'James, didn't you just describe Your Highness?' I wouldn't know, I didn't see Your Highness." On his first-ever interview on The Howard Stern Show to promote the film Spring Breakers, Franco was surprised to hear Stern compliment Your Highness, asking incredulously, "You liked that?" He attributed the film's lackluster performance to its "tricky" blend of lowbrow humor and medieval swords and sorcerers, a combination that hadn't worked well since Monty Python and the Holy Grail.
