= Pretty Bird =

- Directed by: Paul Schneider
- Written by: Paul Schneider
- Starring: Billy Crudup; Paul Giamatti; Kristen Wiig; David Hornsby; Garret Dillahunt; Denis O'Hare
- Cinematography: Igor Martinovic
- Edited by: Annette Davey
- Music by: Wim Mertens
- Production company: Sound Pictures
- Release date: January 20, 2008 (Sundance)
- Running time: 120 minutes
- Country: United States
- Language: English
- Budget: $3.75 million

Pretty Bird is a 2008 American comedy film. It competed in the Dramatic Competition at the 2008 Sundance Film Festival and was released on DVD in the United States on June 29, 2010.

== Plot ==
A sweet-natured guy enlists his best friend, and an engineer who lost his job and has an attitude problem, to help him create and market his idea for a rocket-powered belt. The entrepreneur never loses his confidence the idea will work even though he runs into problems that include finding investors and disagreements with his engineer.

== Cast ==
- Billy Crudup as Curtis Prentiss
- Paul Giamatti as Rick Honeycutt
- David Hornsby as Kenny Owenby
- Kristen Wiig as Mandy Riddle
- Elizabeth Marvel as Tonya Honeycutt
- Denis O'Hare as Chuck Stutters
- Garret Dillahunt as Carson Thrash
- James Wetzel as Dennis
- Anna Camp as Becca French
- Nate Mooney as Randy Pendler
- Aasif Mandvi as Ted the Banker
- Adam LeFevre as Phil the Neighbor
- Lennon Parham as Woman with Beef

== Reception ==
Rotten Tomatoes gives the film a score of 20% based on reviews from 5 critics.

Robert Koehler of Variety criticized the film as being "overly calculated" and predictable, noting that the only bright spot in the film was its soundtrack. Duane Byrge of The Hollywood Reporter wrote ""Pretty Bird flaps one comic wing and one dramatic wing, but this slight-framed bird never soars and ultimately crashes under the weight of its excessive thematic ballast".

== Bibliography ==
- Rosenberg, Adam (June 30, 2010). "Paul Giamatti Finally Unveils Sundance '08 Dark Comedy 'Pretty Bird'". Archived from the original on August 16, 2021.
