= On the Downlow =

- Theatrical poster
- Directed by: Tadeo Garcia
- Written by: Tadeo Garcia, Roger B. Domian
- Produced by: Tadeo Garcia
- Starring: Michael Cortez; Tony Sancho
- Cinematography: Chris Buzek; Tadeo Garcia
- Edited by: Roger B. Domian; Tadeo Garcia
- Music by: Gregory Martin
- Production company: Iconoclast Films
- Release date: 2004
- Running time: 81 minutes
- Country: United States
- Languages: English, Spanish

On the Downlow is the first film directed by Tadeo Garcia, released in 2004. It is a low-budget film starring Michael Cortez and Tony Sancho.

It was released on DVD on January 9, 2007.

The film was expanded from director Tadeo Garcia's 2000 short film Broken Warning.

== Synopsis ==
On the Downlow is a love story set in Little Village, Chicago, between Angel (Michael Cortez) and Isaac (Tony Sancho), two warm, supportive and sensitive young men. Their affection to each other is shown through a long kiss in a dark alley in Chicago and, later on, in a musical sequence in the film. Isaac also questions his sexuality in a long confession with a priest in the church.

Angel, in order to be with his secret lover Isaac, gives up his allegiance to his former Latin Kings gang and pledges to Isaac's Southside Chicago's Two Six gang led by Reaper (Donato Cruz) after a cruel initiation beating. Although the film uses the names of actual gangs in the area, the introduction to the film says there is no direct relationship to the actual gang names used.

When Reaper is later informed that Angel is an ex-gang member of the rival Latin Kings gang, he decides that Isaac should kill him. Issac desperately tries to arrange for him and Angel to escape Chicago but the inevitable happens and the gang captures Angel. When Isaac refuses to execute Angel, Reaper does it. Isaac then kills Reaper and commits suicide.

== Cast ==
- Michael Cortez as Angel
- Tony Sancho as Isaac
- Donato Cruz as Reaper
- Beatriz Jamaica as Angel's Mother
- Carmen Cenko as Isaac's Mother

in alphabetical order

- Felipe Camacho as Priest (credited as Phil Camacho)
- Eric Ambriz as Jimmy
- Jimmy Borras Jr. as Niko
- Juan Castaneda as Hector
- Eddie Cruz as Esau
- Jason R. Davis as Store Customer
- Jeff Docherty as Dorvak's Partner
- Perry Flores as Officer Dorvak
- Russell Foster as Man in Yard
- Ricardo Garcia as Jesus
- Nicolas Gomez as Ozzy
- Brian Parenti as Pinto
- Adelina Quinones as Laura
- Octavio Rivas as Raul
- Jonathan Rodriquez as Adam
- Pricilla Santiago as Burger Joint Girl
- Roberto Soto as Store Owner
- Tatiana Suarez-Pico as Mother on Stairs
- Andrew Todaro as Mike

== Awards ==
- Won "Best Narrative Feature Film" at the New York Newfest Film Festival.

== Critical reception ==
Variety wrote in its review, "Broadening the thematic horizon of gay features isn't enough to compensate for pedestrian handling, as witnessed by "On the Down Low," an amateurish if well-intentioned attempt to merge a Latino gang theme with doomed gay love. An original subject is hampered by poor timing and by-the-numbers scene set-ups."
