= Carlos Lopez (stuntman) =

American stunt performer

Carlos Lopez IV (June 26, 1989 – October 2, 2014) was an American stunt performer.

== Biography ==
Born in North Carolina, Lopez's credits included Olympus Has Fallen (2013), The Hunger Games: Catching Fire (2013), 22 Jump Street (2014), Teenage Mutant Ninja Turtles (2014) and John Wick (2014), as well as the TV series The Vampire Diaries (2009-2017) and Banshee (2013-2016). He also played Henry in the 2006 martial arts comedy film, The Foot Fist Way.

Lopez held a second degree black belt in karate, and was a member of North Carolina's Stuntman Association. While on vacation in Portugal on October 2, 2014, Lopez accidentally fell from a balcony, resulting in his death. The first two episodes, "Into the Ring" and "Cut Man", of Marvel's 2015 Daredevil TV series were dedicated to his memory. He was 25 years old.
