= 50 Ways to Leave Your Lover (film) =

- Film poster with an alternative title
- Directed by: Jordan Hawley
- Screenplay by: Jordan Hawley
- Produced by: J. Todd Harris; Jordan Hawley
- Starring: Paul Schneider
- Cinematography: Dino Parks
- Edited by: James Witker
- Music by: Jeff Burns; Stephen Trask
- Production companies: Davis Entertainment Filmworks; March 7th Productions Limited
- Distributed by: New Line Cinema
- Release date: May 6, 2004 (Tribeca)
- Running time: 95 minutes
- Country: United States
- Language: English

50 Ways to Leave Your Lover is a 2004 American romantic comedy film written and directed by Jordan Hawley and starring Paul Schneider.

== Cast ==
- Paul Schneider as Owen McCabe
- Jennifer Westfeldt as Val
- Poppy Montgomery as Allison
- Tori Spelling as Stephanie
- Fred Willard as Bucky Brandt
- Dorian Missick as Rob
- Elya Baskin as Dr. Stepniak

== Reception ==
The film has a 60% rating based on 5 reviews on Rotten Tomatoes.
