= Steven Gonzales =

American film editor

- Occupation: Film editor
- Years active: 1998 - Present

Steven Gonzales is an American film editor. Best known for his work on independent films, Gonzales is a 1998 graduate of The North Carolina School of the Arts School of Filmmaking where he now works as Head of Post-Production. He edited or co-edited films such as George Washington, All the Real Girls, Undertow, and Shotgun Stories.

== Filmography ==
Year	Film	Director	Other notes
2000	George Washington	David Gordon Green	with Zene Baker
2002	The Rough South of Larry Brown	Gary Hawkins	
2003	All the Real Girls	David Gordon Green	with Zene Baker
2003	Rhythm of the Saints	Sarah Rogacki	
2004	Chicks 101	Lovinder Gill	
2004	Undertow	David Gordon Green	with Zene Baker
2005	Bittersweet Place	Alexandra Brodsky	
2007	Shotgun Stories	Jeff Nichols	
2008	Train Wreck	Andrew Lane	
