= Paul Schneider (actor) =

American film actor

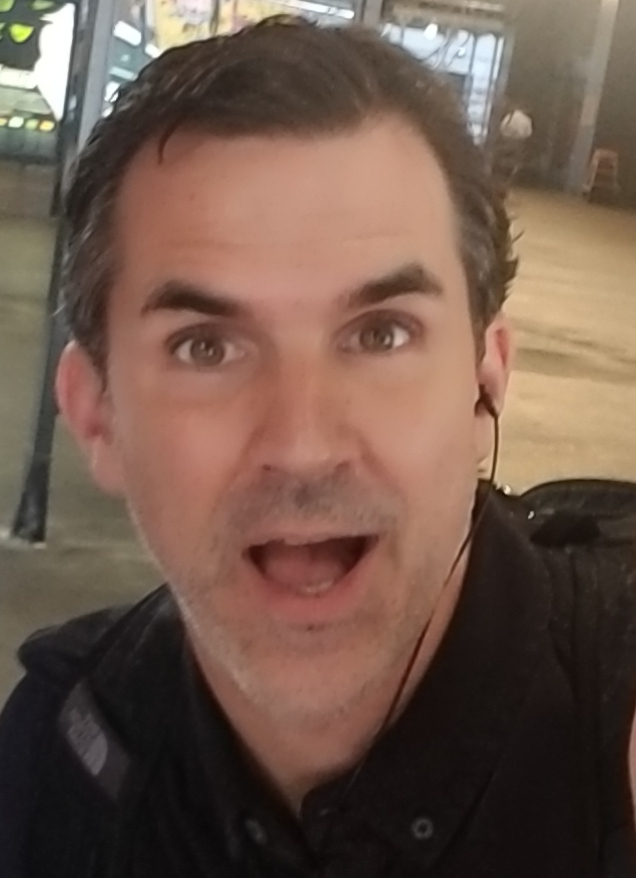
- Schneider in July 2018
- Born: Paul Andrew Schneider; March 16, 1976 (age 50); Asheville, North Carolina, U.S.
- Education: University of North Carolina School of the Arts (BFA)
- Occupation: Actor
- Years active: 1996–present
- Spouse: Theresa Avila (m. 2016)
- Children: 2

Paul Andrew Schneider (born March 16, 1976) is an American actor best known for his portrayal of Dick Liddil in the epic western film The Assassination of Jesse James by the Coward Robert Ford (2007) and his lead role as Mark Brendanawicz on the first and second seasons of the NBC political satirical sitcom Parks and Recreation (2009–10). He also appeared in lead roles in the romantic drama film All the Real Girls (2003) and the comedy film The Babymakers (2012), the former of which he co-wrote with David Gordon Green and was nominated for the Gotham Independent Film Award for Breakthrough Performer.

He has since appeared in supporting roles in films such as Elizabethtown (2005), Lars and the Real Girl (2007), Away We Go (2009), Water for Elephants (2011), Hello Carter (2013), Rules Don't Apply (2016), Brothers by Blood (2020), and American Murderer (2022). For his portrayal of Charles Armitage Brown in the biographical romantic drama film Bright Star (2009), Schneider won the National Society of Film Critics Award for Best Supporting Actor. He was also awarded Best Actor in a Narrative Feature at the Tribeca Film Festival for his performance in the romantic comedy drama film Goodbye to All That (2014).

== Early life ==
Schneider was born and raised in Asheville, North Carolina. He graduated from the University of North Carolina School of the Arts.

== Career ==
In 2000, Schneider made his film debut in David Gordon Green's George Washington and starred in All the Real Girls. As research for his role as Jesse Baylor in Elizabethtown, director Cameron Crowe suggested that Schneider tour with the band My Morning Jacket for five days. Schneider accompanied the band to concerts held in such locations as Irving Plaza, the Webster Theater, the Theater of the Living Arts, and Stone Pony Landing.

After Elizabethtown, Schneider had supporting roles in The Family Stone and Live Free or Die. In 2007, he portrayed Gus Lindstrom in Lars and the Real Girl and Dick Liddil in The Assassination of Jesse James by the Coward Robert Ford. That year, he was named one of "Ten Actors to Watch" by Variety. In 2008, he made his directorial debut with the independent film Pretty Bird. Also in 2008, Schneider played President William Henry Harrison in episode No. 4 of the web series Drunk History.

In 2009, Schneider appeared as Charles Armitage Brown in Bright Star, for which he won the Best Supporting Actor Award from the National Society of Film Critics. The award was shared with Christoph Waltz for Inglourious Basterds. He portrayed Courtney Farlander in Away We Go.

In arguably his most mainstream role, Schneider co-starred as Mark Brendanawicz in the NBC series Parks and Recreation, appearing in the first two seasons from 2009 to 2010 before leaving the series. In an April 2014 interview with ScreenCrush, Schneider said that he had felt sidelined:

That experience was very strange for me. You know, I signed up for a specific character that was changed in mid-season. And it became a character with a lot less to do. And, all of a sudden, I was kind of confused and kind of having a lot less to do.

In 2018, Schneider made his Broadway debut in Young Jean Lee's play Straight White Men as Matt. Schneider's performance earned praise, with The New York Times critic Jesse Green singling him out as one of the highlights of the production.

== Personal life ==
On April 16, 2016, Schneider married Theresa Avila, an occupational therapist and co-founder of The World Lens Foundation, of which Schneider is a board member. The couple have two daughters, Lou and Rae. Schneider is an Innocence Project Ambassador.

== Filmography ==
=== Film ===
Year	Title	Role	Notes
1997	Pleasant Grove	Bedford	Short film
1998	Physical Pinball		Short film
2000	George Washington	Rico Rice	
2003	Security, Colorado	Paul	Filmed in the Dogme 95 style.
2003	All the Real Girls	Paul	Also writer
2003	Crude	Gabe	
2004	50 Ways to Leave Your Lover	Owen McCabe	
2005	Elizabethtown	Jesse Baylor	
2005	The Family Stone	Brad Stevenson	
2006	Live Free or Die	Jeff Lagrand	
2007	The Assassination of Jesse James by the Coward Robert Ford	Dick Liddil	
2007	Lars and the Real Girl	Gus	
2008	Pretty Bird	Beach Dog Jogger	Also writer, director
2009	Bright Star	Charles Armitage Brown	
2009	Away We Go	Courtney Farlander	
2011	Water for Elephants	Charlie O'Brien	
2011	Beloved	Henderson	
2012	The Flowers of War	Terry	
2012	The Babymakers	Tommy Macklin	
2013	Hello Carter	Aaron	
2014	Goodbye to All That	Otto Wall	
2014	Black Eyed Dog		
2014	Straight Men/Same Bed		Short film Writer, director, producer
2015	The Daughter	Christian	
2016	Café Society	Steve	
2016	Rules Don't Apply	Richard Miskin	
2020	Brothers by Blood	Jimmy	
2021	A House on the Bayou	John Chambers	
2022	Abandoned	Dr. Carver	
2022	American Murderer	David Brown	
2025	Train Dreams	Apostle Frank	
2025	Xeno	Chase	
2027	The Families Stone	Brad Stevenson	Filming

=== Television ===
Year	Title	Role	Notes
2003	Third Watch	Thomas Warner	Guest role; 3 episodes
2008	Drunk History	William Henry Harrison	Episode No. 4
2009–2010	Parks and Recreation	Mark Brendanawicz	Main role (seasons 1–2); 30 episodes
2012	The Newsroom	Brian Brenner	Guest role; 2 episodes
2014	The Divide	Clark Rylance	Main role; 6 episodes
2016	The Tunnel	Artem Baturin	Guest role; 4 episodes
2016	Channel Zero: Candle Cove	Mike Painter	Main role; 6 episodes
2017	Chance	Ryan Winter	Main role (season 2); 9 episodes
2018	The Assassination of Gianni Versace: American Crime Story	Paul Beck	Episode: "Ascent"
2020	Tales from the Loop	George	6 episodes
2020	NOS4A2	Jonathan "The Hourglass" Beckett	3 episodes
2022	A Friend of the Family	Marty	Episode: "Revelation"
2023	Law & Order	Daniel Strawn	Episode: "Bias"
2023	Florida Man	Officer Andy Boone	Recurring role
2025	The Righteous Gemstones	Officer Powell	Episode: "Prelude"
2025	The Runarounds	Henry Kinney	3 episodes
2025	Murdaugh: Death in the Family	Billy	4 episodes
2026	Cape Fear	Grayson	Recurring role
2026	The Lowdown	Chili Franks	Episode: “Whiskey Bent and Hell Bound”

== Awards and nominations ==
Year	Award	Category	Work	Result
2003	Gotham Awards	Breakthrough Actor	All the Real Girls	Nominated
2004	Chlotrudis Awards	Best Original Screenplay (shared with David Gordon Green)	All the Real Girls	Nominated
2008	Sundance Film Festival	Dramatic	Pretty Bird	Nominated
2009	Alliance of Women Film Journalists	Best Supporting Actor	Bright Star	Nominated
2009	Hollywood Film Awards	Spotlight Award		Won
2009	Indiewire Critics' Poll	Best Supporting Performance	Bright Star	Nominated
2009	San Diego Film Critics Society Awards	Dramatic	Pretty Bird	Nominated
2009	Village Voice Film Poll	Best Supporting Actor	Bright Star	Nominated
2010	National Society of Film Critics Awards	Best Supporting Actor	Bright Star	Won
2012	RiverRun International Film Festival	Emerging Master		Won
2014	Tribeca Film Festival	Best Actor in a Narrative Feature	Goodbye to All That	Won
2017	Fangoria Chainsaw Awards	Best TV Actor	Channel Zero: Candle Cove	Nominated
