= Kenny Powers (Eastbound & Down) =

- Eastbound & Down character
- First appearance: "Chapter 1"; Eastbound & Down; February 15, 2009
- Last appearance: "Chapter 29"; November 17, 2013
- Portrayed by: Danny McBride

In-universe information
- Nicknames: The People's Champion, The Shelby Sensation, The Reverse Apache Master, The Man with the Golden Dick, Doctor Cock & Balls, Kenny "Fucking" Powers, La Flama Blanca, El Hombre Negro, The Bulletproof Tiger, The Team Leader
- Occupation: Professional baseball pitcher
- Religion: Christian
- Nationality: American

Kenny Powers is a fictional baseball player in the HBO television comedy series Eastbound & Down. The main protagonist of the series, and an antihero, he is portrayed by Danny McBride. He is portrayed as a once dominant, now washed-up baseball pitcher, whose poor work ethic, ego, and short temper ended his professional career. In season one of the series, Powers becomes a substitute physical education teacher while attempting to make a return to Major League Baseball.

Writing for the The New York Times, critic Jon Caramanica described Powers as foul-mouthed, smug, and self-serving; mostly concerned with elevating his own celebrity. Caramanica stated Powers was a rebuke to the more complicated antiheros seen on TV, stating: "The show has served as an implicit rebuke to those who want television to grapple with unlikable, complicated characters. Kenny isn’t complicated, and that’s exactly what made him likable." A commentator described Powers as "equal parts chest-thumping buffoon and insecure wimp".

After polling more than 500 actors, showrunners, and others in the TV industry, The New York Times named Eastbound and Down one of the 100 greatest TV shows of the 21st century, with The Times praising McBride's depiction of the unrepentant, obnoxious, crass Powers.

== Character biography ==
As a 19-year-old closing pitcher, Powers enjoys a spectacular Major League debut, leading Atlanta to the World Series. But Powers' abrasive personality leads him to trouble as he bounces from Atlanta to New York, then to San Francisco, Boston, and finally Seattle in subsequent years. Powers quickly wears out his welcome everywhere he goes, enraging fans with inflammatory statements as his fastball rapidly loses velocity. He tries to compensate for this weakness by using steroids to improve his performance, but in less than seven years he finds his Major League Baseball career over. Lost for direction, he goes back to his hometown of Shelby, North Carolina to accept a job as a substitute physical education teacher at his former school, Jefferson Davis Middle School. He simultaneously tries to win back the affections of former flame April Buchanon (Katy Mixon) while also trying to earn another shot at the majors. He eventually flees to Mexico in shame when his planned Major League comeback fails to materialize.

After laying low in Mexico and playing in an independent league, Kenny finally gets an opportunity for redemption when he's signed by the Myrtle Beach Mermen, the minor league affiliate of the Texas baseball organization. Though still prone to unpredictable and abrasive behavior, Powers manages to keep it together long enough to achieve his dream and he gets called up to pitch in the majors again. However, Powers fakes his own death, believing it is the only way to win back April's heart.

Years after Kenny fakes his death (which he was arrested for) he lives a quiet and unassuming life in suburbia with his wife April and two children as an employee of a car rental company. Upon meeting his old sports colleague Guy Young (Ken Marino), Kenny, who is fed up with his boring life, quits his job and gets his friend to offer him a guest spot on his show The Sports Sesh. After an embarrassing first appearance, Kenny trains to be better and verbally knocks the current wild card football star of the show until he quits, and Kenny received thunderous applause.

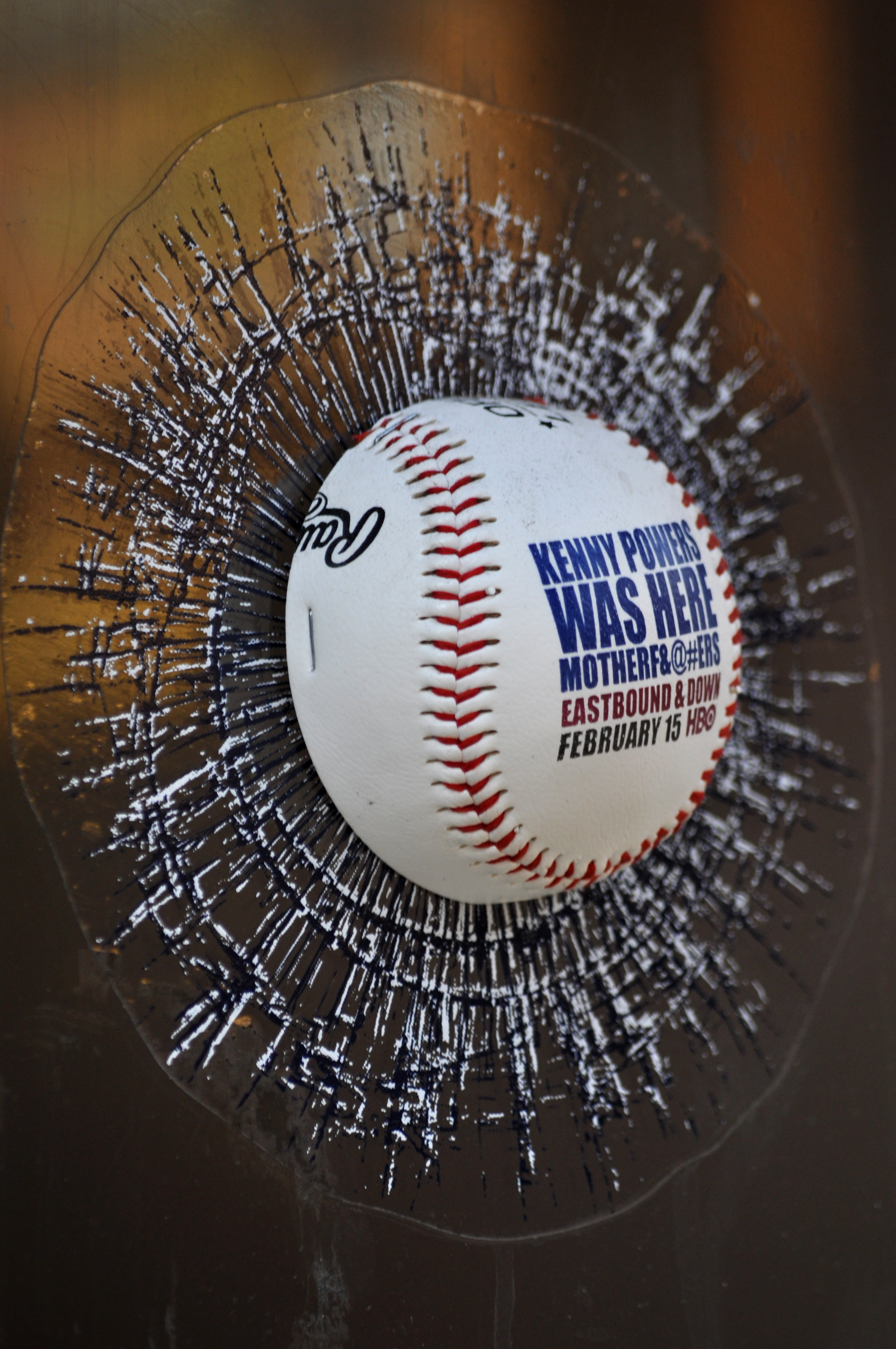
Baseball promoting Eastbound & Down

== Advertisement ==
In 2010, athletic shoe brand K-Swiss began an ad campaign featuring Kenny Powers as the new spokesperson for K-Swiss. The athletic shoe brand teamed up with advertizing agency 72andSunny to create the ads, where in 2011, Powers beomes K-Swiss CEO after a hostile takeover. The campaign focuses on the new Tubes line of K-Swiss shoes, and featured Powers with other K-Swiss athletes including MMA fighter Urijah Faber and American Football player Patrick Willis. K-Swiss reportedly saw a 250% increase in online sales after the ads featuring Powers.
