= The Babymakers =

- Theatrical release poster
- Directed by: Jay Chandrasekhar
- Written by: Peter Gaulke; Gerry Swallow
- Produced by: Jay Chandrasekhar; Jason Blum; Brian Kavanaugh-Jones
- Starring: Paul Schneider; Olivia Munn; Kevin Heffernan; Nat Faxon; Aisha Tyler; Constance Zimmer
- Cinematography: Frank G. DeMarco
- Edited by: Brad Katz
- Music by: Edward Shearmur
- Production companies: Blumhouse Productions; Duck Attack Films; Alliance Films; Automatik Entertainment; IM Global
- Distributed by: Millennium Entertainment
- Release date: August 3, 2012
- Running time: 98 minutes
- Country: United States
- Language: English
- Budget: $2.5 million
- Box office: $475,511

The Babymakers is a 2012 American comedy film directed by Jay Chandrasekhar, and starring Paul Schneider, Olivia Munn and Kevin Heffernan. Chandrasekhar and Heffernan are both members of Broken Lizard. The film received a limited release on August 3, 2012, in theaters and on video on demand services. It received a DVD and Blu-ray release September 18, 2012.

== Plot ==
After trying everything to get his wife Audrey (Munn) pregnant, Tommy (Schneider) suspects that he may be infertile. He recruits his friend (Heffernan) to help him rob a sperm bank where he once made a donation.

== Cast ==
- Paul Schneider as Tommy Macklin
- Olivia Munn as Audrey Macklin
- Wood Harris as Darrell
- Kevin Heffernan as Wade
- Nat Faxon as Zig-Zag
- Jay Chandrasekhar as Ron Jon
- Constance Zimmer as Mona
- Aisha Tyler as Karen
- Jude Ciccolella as Coach Stubbs
- Tom Wright as Butcher
- Tommy Dewey as Todd
- Sharon Maughan as Dr. Roberts
- Tony Sancho as Pedro
- Philippe Brenninkmeyer as Dr. Vickery
- Helena Mattsson as Tanya
- Desi Lydic as Julie
- Bill Fagerbakke as Clark
- Jeanne Sakata as Wanda
- Hayes MacArthur as Leslie Jenkins
- Marc Evan Jackson as Jefferey
- Collette Wolfe as Allison
- Miles Fisher as Groom
- Noureen DeWulf as Bride
- Rick Overton as Officer Raspler
- M. C. Gainey as Officer Malloy
- Candace Smith as Roxie
- Lindsey Kraft as Greta

== Reception ==
The film has received largely negative reviews. Review aggregation website Rotten Tomatoes gives a score of 8% based on 51 reviews, and an average rating of 3.5/10. The critical consensus states: "The Babymakers mistakes raunch for humor and, despite a few sporadic laughs, wastes its otherwise capable cast on gross-out gags and misfired one-liners."

Roger Ebert gave the film 1 star out of 4.
