= Tony Sancho =

American actor

- Occupation: Actor

Tony Sancho is an American stage and film / television actor based in Los Angeles best known for his lead role as Isaac in Tadeo Garcia's debut film On the Downlow also featuring starring Michael Cortez as Angel.

== Biography ==
Tony Sancho has a background on the theatre stage as member of Teatro Vista, the only Equity Latino theatre company in the Midwest. He played the role of Ritchie Valens in Buddy: The Buddy Holly Story that played on the Drury Lane Theater, as Lazado in the Teatro Vista production of Octavio Solis's Dreamlandia that played in the Victory Gardens Theater. He played Cheche in Nilo Cruz's Anna in the Tropics at the Goodman Theatre, as well as productions at Remy Bumppo, Steppenwolf, The Journeymen Theater Company and Pegasus Players.

In 2010, he took part in Los Angeles in Octavio Solis's play Lydia in the role of Rene. The play was a production of Yale Repertory Theatre. He also took part in Muthafucker with Hat at the Ojai Playwrights Conference and in Need Theatre's production of Michael John Garces' The Web.

His film credits besides the award-winning On the Downlow include television credits in episodes of ER and The Forgotten.

== Theatre ==
(selective)

- Buddy: The Buddy Holly Story as Ritchie Valens {Teatro Vista]
- Dreamlandia [Teatro Vista]
- Anna in the Tropics as Cheche
- Lydia as Rene [Yale Repertory Theatre]
- The Web [Need Theatre]

== Filmography ==
- 2004: On the Downlow as Isaac
- 2005: The Trouble with Dee Dee as Busboy
- 2011: Hospitality as waiter (short)
- 2012: The Babymakers as Pedro

Television

- 2007: ER (TV series) in 1 episode "Patients" as Emilio
- 2010: The Forgotten (TV series) in 1 episode "Living Doe" as Darryl Diaz
- 2017-18: Snowfall (TV series) in 6 episode as Stomper
