= Thrilling Tales of Modern Men =

2026 collection of stories by Danny McBride

- First edition cover
- Author: Danny McBride
- Language: English
- Genre: Short story collection
- Publisher: Random House
- Publication date: June 23, 2026
- Publication place: United States
- Media type: Print (hardcover), e-book, audiobook
- Pages: 368
- ISBN: 9780593594759

Thrilling Tales of Modern Men is a collection of ten short stories by the actor and comedian Danny McBride. First published on June 23, 2026 by Random House, the stories center on men struggling with their identity. David Marchese of The New York Times described McBride as a "storyteller interested in entertaining while also poking at what makes men tick and then go boom."

== Background ==
Prior to embarking on the novel, McBride had written approximately 80 episodes of television, and he started seriously considering a book during the COVID-19 pandemic, after recently finishing a season of The Righteous Gemstones. He was attracted to the brevity and flexibility of short stories, telling The Ringer: "I just wanted to tell a lot of different stories. It was too hard to commit to just one." McBride described the depiction of manhood in Cormac McCarthy's Blood Meridian as an inspiration, stating that McCarthy's "manhood is measured by ability to act, withstand and commit violence."

Random House obtained the rights to McBride's book in 2023.

== Reception ==
Nick Martin of The Defector called McBride a skilled writer who can manage perspectives from multiple characters. Martin, however, viewed the stories as suffering from a disconnect with their settings, writing: "Without a deeper sense of where these people are from, there's no unique sense of dialogue or prose from story to story."

== Contents ==
#	Title	Synopsis
1	"The Illusionist"	Divorcee and father of two, Greg finds himself in a funk. He quits his job to pursue a vocation as a magician, with the goal of performing a stunt that involves suspending himself in a glass box for thirty days at the local mall. In the process, he upsets another local magician.
2	"RoboCare™"	An old widower, George, reluctantly receives a prototype of a robot from the company RoboCare after his children decide that he needs help around the house. George, however, resents the robot, finding it strange and unnecessary. He struggles to adapt to the machine, coming into increasing friction with it.
3	"The Vicious Kind"	Seth is underemployed after getting laid off from a job in software engineering, while also experiencing strain with his wife and son. When an unknown person parks a boat in the field across from his house, Seth trains his ire on the vessel. One night in a fit of rage, he smashes it with an axe. He must then cover his tracks and deal with the aftermath.
4	"The Book Burner"	Dwayne burns copies of a newly released novel at several bookstores and then flees the scene. The cover of the book depicts a family trapped in a car by a wild animal. Dwayne believes that the author, Marcus, based the book on his family's real-life tragedy involving an escaped tiger. The aggrieved Dwayne seeks revenge on Marcus.
5	"The Institute of Men"	Mitchie, who works in an auto-parts store, is beginning to lose his hair in middle age. Upset with his appearance, he goes on a whim to a facility called the Institute of Men that promises to restore his hair. The "treatment" at the Institute involves several strange practices, such as answering personal questions about himself and eating a worm. Following the visit, his hair successfully regrows rapidly, giving Mitchie new confidence. However, the new hair comes with dangerous strings attached.
6	"Last Night of the Runaway Adventure"	Two thirteen-year-old boys, Burt and Ben, have been on the run from home for several weeks. Burt elects to return home, while Ben plans to make his way to California. At home, Burt faces challenges reintegrating with his parents and classmates, while worrying about the fate of Ben.
7	"Gerald's Wife"	Gerald and his wife Tracy are at a house party. Tracy, who does not feel appreciated in the friend group, finds fault with many of the guests and makes backhanded compliments. When no one is looking, she smashes another woman's phone but the incident is caught on a nanny cam.
8	"Mr. Liptrapp's Sword"	A high school history teacher, Mr. Liptrapp, is metal detecting near the site of a Civil War battlefield when he finds a sword that belonged to a general. A wealthy collector gets wind of the find and when Liptrapp won't part with it, he turns to force. The sword seems to have a mind of its own and supernatural powers.
9	"Fun Run"	Phil is at a work conference, when he meets Denny, another attendee who makes strange remarks and dominates conversations. The conference attendees move to a bar, and Phil reluctantly car pools with Denny. Denny soon initiates a sick game with Phil and reveals he is unemployed and was crashing the conference.
10	"Dad's Way: A Hilarious '90s Sitcom"	Mike is an aging movie star, who formerly played the father in a family sitcom. A reunion of the sitcom brings Mike back with the actors who played his wife and children.
