= Observe and Report =

- Theatrical release poster
- Directed by: Jody Hill
- Written by: Jody Hill
- Produced by: Donald De Line
- Starring: Seth Rogen; Anna Faris; Michael Peña; Ray Liotta
- Cinematography: Tim Orr
- Edited by: Zene Baker
- Music by: Joseph Stephens
- Production companies: Legendary Pictures; De Line Pictures
- Distributed by: Warner Bros. Pictures
- Release dates: March 16, 2009 (SXSW); April 10, 2009 (United States)
- Running time: 86 minutes
- Country: United States
- Language: English
- Budget: $18 million
- Box office: $27 million

Observe and Report is a 2009 American black crime comedy film written and directed by Jody Hill and starring Seth Rogen, Anna Faris, and Ray Liotta. It follows a mentally unstable vigilante mall cop who attempts to join the police academy and pursues a flasher tormenting female visitors to the mall where he works. It premiered at SXSW on March 16, 2009, and was released by Warner Bros. Pictures on April 10, 2009, and received mixed reviews from critics, while it grossed $27 million against an $18 million budget.

== Plot ==
An anonymous flasher exposes himself to shoppers in the Forest Ridge Mall parking lot. The head of mall security, Ronnie Barnhardt, makes it his mission to apprehend the offender. But while he is ostensibly well-intentioned and valiant in his own mind, in reality, Ronnie is emotionally unstable and has vigilante tendencies. Ronnie apparently experiences bipolar disorder and delusions of grandeur and displays violent ideation, among other problems.

The criminal activity at the mall continues as the flasher exposes himself to makeup counter worker Brandi and a masked robber causes property damage at a shoe store. In both instances, police Detective Harrison arrives to investigate. He and Ronnie dislike each other, as Ronnie believes Harrison is usurping his authority and the detective believes that Ronnie is disrupting the investigation.

Ronnie decides to take steps to become a police officer. As part of his preparations, he decides to do a ride-along with Harrison. The detective tricks him into walking into the most dangerous part of town and drives off. Ronnie confronts and assaults several drug dealers, victoriously returning to the police station with a dealer's son and thanking Harrison for the opportunity to prove himself.

Emboldened, Ronnie arranges a date with Brandi. On their date, she sees him taking a clonazepam for mental health reasons and assumes that he takes them recreationally. She asks him to share and he gives her the entire bottle, believing he no longer needs it.

Ronnie passes the background check and physical examination for the police officer job, but fails the psychological examination. Nell, a friendly food court worker, tearfully tells Ronnie that her coworker Trina and boss Roger tease her for having her leg in a cast. Ronnie beats Roger up and warns him and Trina not to harass Nell again.

Depressed, Ronnie is persuaded by fellow security officer Dennis to spend the day doing a wide variety of drugs and assaulting skateboarding teenagers. At the end of the day, Dennis reveals that he is the one who has been stealing from the mall. Ronnie insists this is wrong and, after a brief argument, Dennis knocks him unconscious and flees.

Ronnie decides to go undercover to catch the flasher, but when he catches Brandi having sex with Harrison in the parking lot, he confronts her in front of onlookers at the mall the next day, blowing his cover and destroying a display case. The police are summoned and Ronnie fights them off, defeating the regular officers, until he is overpowered by Harrison and arrested.

A few days later, Ronnie's mother gives him a postcard from Dennis in Mexico, who respects Ronnie for caring so much. Ronnie returns to the mall, despondent that he no longer works security. He discovers that Nell's cast has been removed. She kisses him, just before the flasher arrives and exposes himself to them in the food court.

After a brief chase, Ronnie incapacitates the flasher by shooting him in the shoulder. As he picks the bleeding flasher up, Brandi thanks him, but he rejects and publicly humiliates her for sleeping with Harrison. Ronnie brings the flasher to the police station, gloating that he has won by apprehending him. He is interviewed by the local news, having regained his job and begun dating Nell.

== Cast ==
- Seth Rogen as Ronnie Barnhardt
- Ray Liotta as Detective Harrison
- Collette Wolfe as Nell Jones
- Anna Faris as Brandi Gaffney
- Michael Peña as Dennis Chavante
- Jesse Plemons as Charles Gaffney
- Aziz Ansari as Saddamn
- Dan Bakkedahl as Mark
- John Yuan as John Yuen
- Matthew Yuan as Matt Yuen
- Celia Weston as Mrs. Barnhardt
- Randy Gambill as Pervert
- Patton Oswalt as Roger
- Ben Best as Detective Okarski
- Danny McBride as Caucasian Crackhead
- Lauren Miller as Trina
- Alston Brown as Bruce
- Cody Midthunder as D-Rock

== Production ==
The film was shot on location in the largely abandoned Winrock Shopping Center in Albuquerque, New Mexico. Filming began around May 2008.

At the request of the studio, during the test screening stage the filmmakers created a version of the film that was toned down, but that was scrapped as the test screening scores for the new version were lower than the original.

=== Writing ===
Observe and Report was written and directed by Jody Hill. The megalomaniac, manic-depressive security guard Ronnie has been compared to Travis Bickle in Martin Scorsese's Taxi Driver; Hill has mentioned it and also Scorsese's The King of Comedy as significant influences.

The film has drawn some attention for having a plot revolving around a "mall cop" like the 2009 family comedy Paul Blart: Mall Cop. Seth Rogen, in an interview with GQ, noted his awareness of another "mall cop" movie being made:

We knew the whole time, actually. And we're friends with those guys, so we would literally send each other pictures of the wardrobe, just to make sure we weren't stepping on each other's toes. They're totally different movies.

However, in 2019, Rogen expressed anger at his discovery that Paul Blart: Mall Cop had "gotten the script and ripped us off, even though they're very different movies...One way or another I'm not thrilled with Paul Blart: Mall Cop in relation to how Observe and Report was received."

In comparing the two, Observe and Report was dubbed by some reviewers as "the dark mall cop movie".

== Reception ==
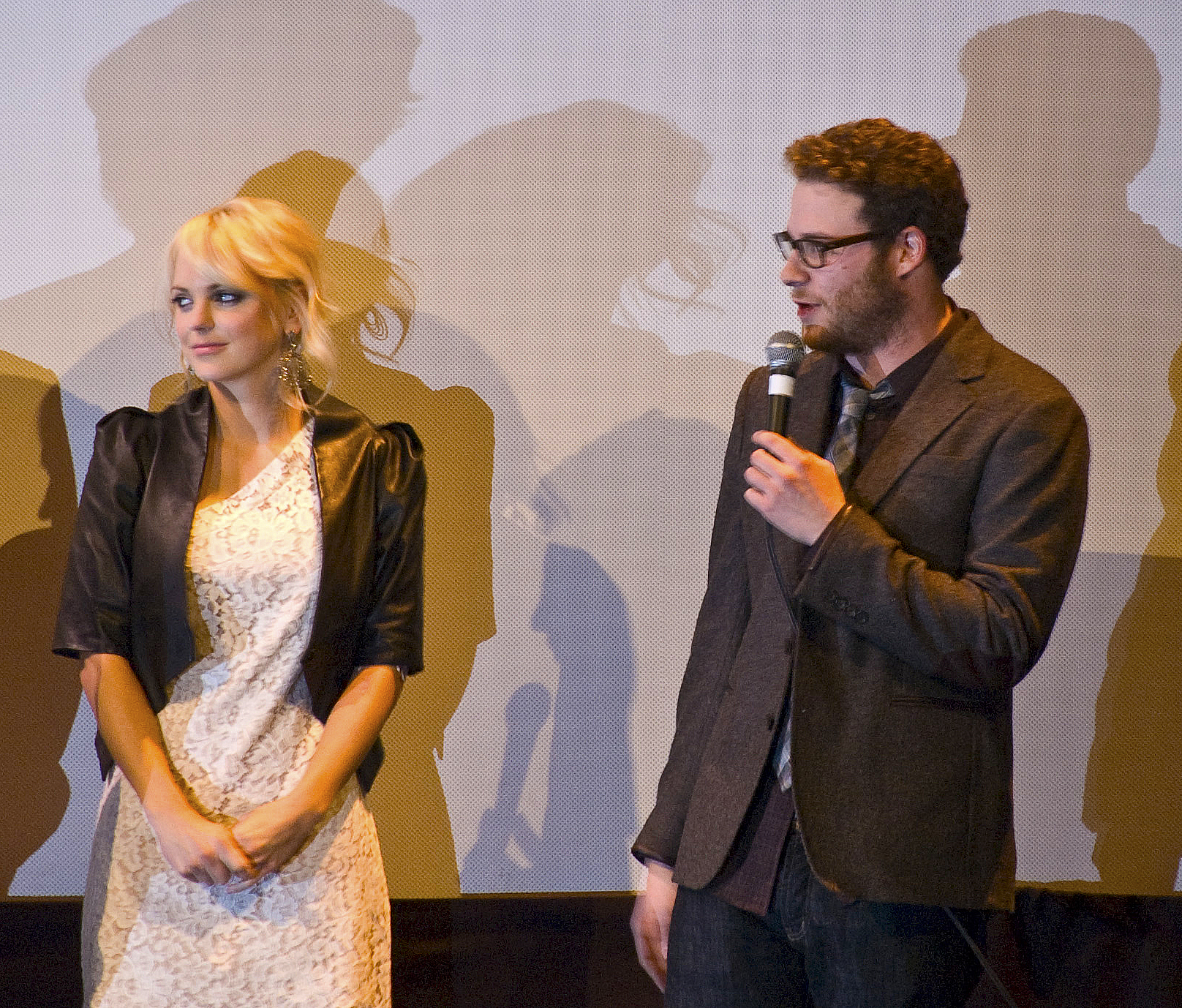
Anna Faris and Seth Rogen fielding questions at the film's premiere at the 2009 South by Southwest Festival

=== Critical response ===
On Rotten Tomatoes, the film holds an approval rating of 51% based on 211 reviews, with an average rating of 5.60/10. The site's critics consensus reads: "Though it has a mean streak, and does not cater to all tastes, Observe and Report has gut-busting laughs and a fully committed Seth Rogen in irresistible form." On Metacritic, the film received a weighted average score of 54 out of 100, based on 35 critics, indicating "mixed or average reviews". Audiences polled by CinemaScore gave the film an average grade of "C" on an A+ to F scale.

Peter Travers of Rolling Stone gave the film a rating of three out of four stars, saying, "Hill is fearless at pushing hot buttons: date rape, shooting up and worse," and "Rogen is nutso hilarious, nailing every note of mirth and malice." Conversely, Peter Bradshaw of The Guardian awarded the movie one star out of five and disparaged Rogen's performance, writing "for Seth Rogen fans like me, this charmless, heavy-handed and cynical comedy is an uncomfortable experience." Paul Byrnes wrote in, "Much of the movie is just plain vicious. At best, it's sad and grotesque, rather than hilarious," while Manohla Dargis of The New York Times stated "if you thought Abu Ghraib was a laugh riot you might love Observe and Report." She continued, "It's far better and certainly easier ... to sit back and relax and enjoy the show. That, after all, is precisely what Hollywood banks on each time it manufactures a new entertainment for a public that—as the stupid, violent characters who hold up a mirror to that public indicate—it views with contempt."

The film drew criticism for its comic portrayal of date rape from a number of notable publications, including Vulture, The Sydney Morning Herald, and The New York Times. On their date, Brandi drinks copious amounts of alcohol at the restaurant and afterward asks Ronnie for a bottle of his prescription medication, clonazepam, a combination which leaves Brandi so incapacitated that she can neither stand on her own nor open her eyes. Despite the fact that Brandi is clearly inebriated and unfit to give consent, Ronnie kisses her after she vomits and engages in intercourse with her as she lies motionless on the bed, stopping once he notices she appears to be unconscious, before Brandi asks him why he stopped.

During an interview on The Howard Stern Show, Rogen stated he was disappointed by the film's overall reception, but proud that "the only two people who liked it" were Stern and David Letterman.

=== Box office ===
The film grossed $11 million in its opening weekend (an average of $4,085 at 2,727 theaters), finishing in fourth place, behind Hannah Montana: The Movie, Fast & Furious, and Monsters vs. Aliens (also featuring Rogen). It ultimately grossed $27 million at the box office. To date, it is the third lowest-grossing film of Rogen's starring career, before Take this Waltz and The Interview.

== Release ==
The film was released on April 10, 2009, in the United States.

=== Home media ===
The film was released on DVD and Blu-ray on September 22, 2009.

== Soundtrack ==
Observe and Report: Original Motion Picture Soundtrack

Soundtrack album by Various Artists
- Released: April 7, 2009
- Genre: Soundtrack
- Label: New Line Records

Observe and Report: Original Motion Picture Soundtrack was released on April 7, 2009, by New Line Records.

1. "When I Paint My Masterpiece" by The Band – 4:18
2. "The Man" by Patto – 6:07
3. "Lightsabre Cocksucking Blues" by McLusky – 1:51
4. "Sittin' Back Easy" by Patto – 3:35
5. "Brain" by The Action – 2:59
6. "Over Under Sideways Down" by The Yardbirds – 2:22
7. "Dwarves Must Die" by Dwarves – 1:23
8. "Help Is on Its Way" by Little River Band – 4:00
9. "Where Is My Mind?" by City Wolf – 4:27
10. "Babyteeth" by Pyramid – 4:10
11. "Observe and Report Score Suite" by Joseph Stephens – 4:04
12. "Super Freek (Remix)" by Amanda Blank, Nina Cream So Supa, and Aaron LaCrate – 2:26

The Queen songs "It's Late" and "The Hero" are featured in the film but not included on the soundtrack.

== See also ==
- Paul Blart: Mall Cop
- Paul Blart: Mall Cop 2
- Twin films
