= All the Real Girls =

2003 film by David Gordon Green

- Theatrical release poster
- Directed by: David Gordon Green
- Screenplay by: David Gordon Green
- Story by: David Gordon Green; Paul Schneider
- Produced by: Jean Doumanian; Lisa Muskat
- Starring: Paul Schneider; Zooey Deschanel; Patricia Clarkson; Shea Whigham
- Cinematography: Tim Orr
- Edited by: Zene Baker; Steven Gonzales
- Music by: Michael Linnen; David Wingo
- Production companies: Jasmine Productions; Jean Doumanian Productions; Muskat Filmed Properties
- Distributed by: Sony Pictures Classics
- Release dates: January 19, 2003 (Sundance); February 14, 2003 (United States)
- Running time: 108 minutes
- Country: United States
- Language: English
- Budget: $1 million
- Box office: $579,986

All the Real Girls is a 2003 American romantic drama film written and directed by David Gordon Green from an original story by Green and Paul Schneider. The film stars Schneider, Zooey Deschanel, Shea Whigham and Patricia Clarkson. It is about the romance between a young womanizer and his best friend's sexually inexperienced younger sister in the Appalachian countryside of Western North Carolina. The film premiered at the Sundance Film Festival on January 19, 2003. It was well-received by critics and was nominated for several film festival awards, with Green winning a Special Jury Prize at Sundance.

== Plot ==
Paul is a young womanizer who lives in the small town of Marshall, North Carolina, and earns a living fixing cars for his uncle Leland. He still lives with his mother, Elvira, who works as a clown cheering up children at the local hospital.

Paul often hangs out with his friends: self-proclaimed partner-in-crime Tip, Bo, and Bust-Ass. Among his friends, Paul has a reputation as a ladies' man and is not known for being involved in long-term relationships; most of his romances last only a few weeks, and he has slept with nearly every girl in town.

Paul begins to reach a point where he would like to lead a different life when he meets Noel, Tip’s teenage sister who has returned home after attending boarding school and works at a factory in Asheville. Noel is more thoughtful and mature than the girls Paul is used to. They begin a relationship in private. When Tip hears rumors of Paul and Noel being together, he furiously confronts Paul and wants to know if he is having sex with Noel. Paul refuses to answer, and when their friends try to pull them away from fighting, Tip takes out his anger by beating up another guy.

Paul continues to see Noel despite the rift with Tip. After they make out on a bed one night, Noel wants to go further but Paul stops her. He gets off the bed and tells her that he does not want to hurt her like he has hurt so many other girls. He tenderly expresses to her that he did not expect to like her so much after she returned, but he feels he can be real with her, and he is worried about what she thinks of his reputation. She tells him she is a virgin, and she trusts him.

Later, Noel asks Paul if they can spend the night in a motel. She emotionally tells him about a set of scars on her side: a few years earlier, her dad had let her drive their boat on a lake, but she was careless and ran over a boy in the water. She fell on the deck in horror and began clawing at her skin with a fishhook. Noel says she just wanted to feel pain for what she had done, and Paul comforts her. They go out swimming near the motel that night, then return to the room and make a tent with the sheets on the bed. When he returns home, Paul's mother is waiting by her bed, disappointed because he forgot to return her car, causing her to ride her bike to a disabled child's party tardily.

Paul later finds Tip sitting along the river in town. He asks Paul to do right by Noel, withholding his anger at how much the two of them used to sleep with women without a care. Then he reveals that he got a local girl pregnant, which has sent him on a drinking bender. Paul asks if he loves the girl, and Tip guesses he does. Meanwhile, Bust-Ass, who has an interest in Noel, starts becoming friendly with her. Noel tells Paul that she will be spending the weekend at a friend's lake house.

When Noel returns, she has come back with a short new haircut. When Paul notices she has a hesitant air about her, she says something happened while she was away. She painfully admits she slept with another guy, and Paul is heartbroken, resulting in a breakup.

At the bar one night, a drunken Paul sees Noel come in with Bust-Ass. They are just friends, but the sight of them together incenses Paul and he causes a scene. Noel is annoyed with Paul’s behavior, but after he apologizes, she takes him back to her place and they have sex.

Sometime later, Paul and Noel are no longer seeing each other but remain on friendly terms. Paul still has some lingering heartache over his first love but has emerged out of the relationship a better person thanks to Noel and tries to move on.

== Cast ==
- Paul Schneider as Paul
- Zooey Deschanel as Noel
- Shea Whigham as Tip
- Danny McBride as Bust-Ass
- Patricia Clarkson as Elvira
- Benjamin Mouton as Uncle Leland
- Maurice Compte as Bo
- Heather McComb as Mary-Margaret
- Matthew Chapman as Strong Bad

== Production ==
=== Development ===
Feeling unseen by the romance films released at the time, David Gordon Green and Paul Schneider conceived and began writing All the Real Girls during the late 1990s. Green sought to make a film that was both "contemporary" and "how it feels when you get your gut in a knot". After working on George Washington, Green had several projects he intended to pursue, including a science fiction film and a western film. However, when funding failed to come through for either project, Green got a job at a doorknob factory before turning back to All the Real Girls, a movie he felt "obligated" to make while in his youth and "while these feelings were still fresh and these wounds were still bleeding". Before partnering with Jean Doumanian and Lisa Muskat, a studio had offered Green a larger budget to produce the film. Green would pass due to the studio wanting to cast Freddie Prinze Jr. instead of Schneider.

=== Pre-production ===
The crew for All the Real Girls was mostly the same as that of George Washington, most members of which were colleagues from University of North Carolina School of the Arts. Schneider, whose background was mostly in editing, takes on the film's leading role. Feeling closely related to the character of Paul, he said, "All you need to do is to have grown up in North Carolina and had your heart broken, and you're good to go." For the character of Noel, Green and Schneider strived to get the casting "right". Zooey Deschanel was cast, after Green and Schneider felt she embodied how they envisioned the character, and for elevating the material they had written for her. Danny McBride, who served as a second unit director on George Washington, was cast in the supporting role in his acting debut in this film.

=== Filming ===
Principal photography for the film was underway in the fall of 2001 in Marshall and Asheville, North Carolina. During production, Green allowed the actors to take scenes in different directions from where the script initially went. This led to the film to take on a new "life of its own". Green also felt to stray away from genre cliches and scenes that had largely been done before. Instead he opted to focus on "unique magical moments". These decisions resulted in the first forty pages of the script being discarded from the final film, including a scene where Paul and Noel meet for the first time.

== Reception ==
=== Box office ===
All the Real Girls was given a limited release on February 14, 2003. It played in six theaters, bringing in $39,714 in its opening weekend. It grossed $579,986 on a $1 million budget.

=== Critical response ===
The film received positive reviews. On Rotten Tomatoes, it has an approval rating of 71%, based on 115 reviews, with an average rating of 6.9/10. The site's consensus states, "Has enough honest moments to warrant a look." On Metacritic, it has a score of 71 out of 100, based on 36 critics, indicating "generally favorable" reviews.

Roger Ebert of the Chicago Sun Times said “Green is 27, old enough to be jaded, but he has the soul of a romantic poet. Wordsworth, after all, was 36 when he published, ‘The Rainbow comes and goes and lovely as the Rose.’ How many guys that age would have that kind of nerve today?” He gave the film a four out of four star rating.

=== Awards and nominations ===
The film was nominated for awards at several different film festivals globally. Green was nominated for the Grand Jury Prize at the Sundance Film Festival, and ended up winning the Special Jury Prize for Emotional Truth, as did Patricia Clarkson for Outstanding Performance. Zooey Deschanel was nominated for Best Female Lead at the 2004 Independent Spirit Awards and Best Actress at the 2004 Mar del Plata Film Festival.
