= The Foot Fist Way =

2006 film by Jody Hill

- Theatrical release poster
- Directed by: Jody Hill
- Written by: Jody Hill; Danny McBride; Ben Best
- Produced by: Erin Gates; Jody Hill; Robbie Hill; Jennifer Chikes
- Starring: Danny McBride
- Cinematography: Brian Mandle
- Edited by: Zene Baker; Jeff Seibenick
- Music by: Pyramid
- Production companies: MTV Films; Gary Sanchez Productions; You Know I Can't Kiss You, Inc.
- Distributed by: Paramount Vantage
- Release dates: January 2006 (Sundance); May 30, 2008 (United States)
- Running time: 85 minutes
- Country: United States
- Language: English
- Budget: $79,000
- Box office: $245,292

The Foot Fist Way is a 2006 American martial arts black comedy film directed by Jody Hill and starring Danny McBride. The film was produced by Gary Sanchez Productions that picked up distribution rights to the film and hoped for it to achieve a Napoleon Dynamite-like success.

== Plot ==
Fred Simmons is a fourth-degree black belt in Taekwondo who runs his own dojang in a small North Carolina town. He styles himself a big shot, driving a Ferrari and extolling the virtues of Taekwondo to potential new students, but loses his confidence after he discovers that his wife, Suzie gave her boss a handjob after a drunken office party. In order to restore his confidence, he attends a martial arts expo.

He meets his idol, B movie action star Chuck "the Truck" Wallace, who in reality turns out to be a dirty and drunken mess. After nearly brawling with Chuck's seedy friends, Fred persuades Chuck to make an appearance at his upcoming Taekwondo belt test and then parties with his friends and students in Chuck's hotel room. Fred returns home and sells his Ferrari to pay Chuck's $10,000 appearance fee. Shortly thereafter, Suzie returns to Fred after losing her job.

On the night before the belt test, Fred catches Suzie having sex with Chuck on his own couch. Fred challenges Chuck to a fight, but is eventually beaten and driven off. The next morning, Suzie once again asks to be taken back, but Fred rejects her and urinates on his wedding ring. Fred arrives at the test late, battered and bruised, but with his confidence restored. When Chuck arrives for his appearance, Fred challenges him to a martial arts demonstration of board breaking, which he wins. At the following belt ceremony, Fred reads a new student pledge that he has written, which outlines the goals and responsibilities of Taekwondo.

== Cast ==
- Danny McBride as Fred Simmons, a black belt and instructor of Taekwondo in a small southern town.
- Ben Best as Chuck "The Truck" Wallace, a B movie action star. Best is also a member of the music band Pyramid, who supplied songs to the film's soundtrack. Other members of the band played bit parts as Chuck's friends at his party.
- Mary Jane Bostic as Suzie Simmons, Fred's unfaithful, spandex-clad wife.
- Spencer Moreno as Julio, Fred's overweight adolescent second-in-command at the dojang.
- Carlos Lopez IV as Henry, a meek youth who finds self-confidence through Taekwondo.
- Jody Hill as Mike McAlister, Fred's intense friend and fellow Taekwondo black belt.
- Collette Wolfe as Denise
- Jonathan M Ewart as Charles

All martial artists in the film, excluding McBride and Best, were played by true Taekwondo practitioners, many from Concord Taekwondo in Concord, North Carolina.

== Promotion ==
On February 26, 2008, McBride appeared as Fred Simmons on Late Night with Conan O'Brien. Many viewers were unfamiliar with either Fred or McBride and as a result there was initially much speculation as to whether the seemingly disastrous Tae Kwon Do demonstration, during which Fred asked for a "redo" after a failed block-splitting attempt and awkward interview, during which he repeatedly lashed out at fellow guest Will Ferrell for dancing around in a sexual nature during his interview segment earlier, were real or staged. Among the only immediate clues to suggest the interview was a setup was when the website for the film was flashed onscreen during the interview.

== Critical response ==
The Foot Fist Way received mixed reviews from critics. On Rotten Tomatoes, the film has a 53% approval rating, based on 83 reviews, with an average rating of 5.5/10. The site's critical consensus reads, "The rough edges and biting humor of this martial arts comedy will keep audiences laughing and cringing in turns." On Metacritic, the film has a score of 63 out of 100, based on 22 critics, indicating "generally favorable reviews".

John Anderson of Variety gave the film a fairly positive review, stating that the film is "crying out to be discovered by midnight movie mavens".

== Home media ==
The film was released on DVD on February 10, 2009, by Paramount Home Entertainment.

== Soundtrack ==
The digital-only soundtrack was released in May 2008 by Lakeshore Entertainment and features fifteen songs by the band, Pyramid, of which "The Foot Fist Way" writer and actor, Ben Best was a member. The band, Kung Flude, features current Electric Frankenstein singer, Johnny Flude.

“The Foot Fist Way” soundtrack track list

1. “Put To The Test” – Pyramid
2. “Dog Wild Heaven” – Pyramid
3. “That’s What They Call Them” – Pyramid
4. "Hi Ya” – Kung Flude
5. “The Handjob Lament” – Pyramid
6. "Sex Prowl” – Pyramid
7. "Sad Ferrari” – Pyramid
8. "Mike’s Theme” – Pyramid
9. "Mother’s Day” – Sexual Warriors
10. "Ode To Ude” – Pyramid
11. "I Control Your Rock N’ Roll” – Kung Flude
12. "Elevate” – Pyramid
13. "Walkin On” – Birds of Avalon
14. "Not Really Feeling This Party” – Uno Dose
15. "Sea Lung” – Dynamite Brothers
16. "Flesh Tiger” – Dynamite Brothers & Pyramid
17. "The Ballad Of The Blow Job” – Dynamite Brothers
18. "Seven Rings Of Pain” – Pyramid
19. "Guts” – Pyramid
20. "Anthem” – Dynamite Brothers
21. "Confidence” – Pyramid
22. "Sleep Walkin Again” – Dynamite Brothers
23. "Trendels” – Pyramid
24. "Sack O’ Locks” – Dynamite Brothers
25. "Drunk Bed Dance” – Pyramid
