= Eastbound & Down =

American television series

- Promotional poster
- Genre: Sports comedy
- Created by: Ben Best; Jody Hill; Danny McBride
- Written by: Jody Hill; Danny McBride; Shawn D. Harwell (seasons 1–2); Various (seasons 1 & 3–4)
- Starring: Danny McBride; Steve Little; Katy Mixon; John Hawkes; Will Ferrell; Jennifer Irwin; Craig Robinson; Andrew Daly; Ben Best; Ana de la Reguera; Michael Peña; Marco Rodríguez; Efren Ramirez; Elizabeth De Razzo; Ken Marino; Tim Heidecker; Tyler Palmer; Jillian Bell
- Opening theme: "Going Down" by Freddie King
- Composers: Wayne Kramer; Joseph Stephens
- Country of origin: United States
- Original language: English
- No. of seasons: 4
- No. of episodes: 29

Production
- Executive producers: Will Ferrell; Adam McKay; Chris Henchy; Jody Hill; Danny McBride; Ben Best; Stephanie Laing; David Gordon Green
- Producer: Stephanie Laing
- Running time: 30 minutes
- Production companies: Rough House Pictures; Gary Sanchez Productions; Enemy MIGs Productions

Original release
- Network: HBO
- Release: February 15, 2009 – November 17, 2013

Eastbound & Down is an American sports comedy television series that was broadcast on HBO, and created by Ben Best, Jody Hill and Danny McBride. It stars McBride as Kenny Powers, a former professional baseball pitcher who, after a career downturn in the major leagues, is forced to return to his hometown middle school in Shelby, North Carolina, as a substitute physical education teacher.

Producers Will Ferrell and Adam McKay received an order for six episodes for the first season from HBO. The series was produced by Ferrell's production company, Gary Sanchez Productions. The show premiered February 15, 2009. Its second season, consisting of seven episodes, began on September 26, 2010. On October 27, HBO announced it was renewing the show for a third season. At PaleyFest 2011, it was announced that the third season, which premiered on February 19, 2012, would be the last. In July 2012, HBO picked up the comedy series for a fourth season of eight episodes.

On June 6, 2013, HBO announced that the fourth season would be the show's last. The fourth season premiered on September 29, 2013, and ended its run on November 17, 2013.

== Plot ==
Years after he turned his back on his hometown, Kenny Powers, a burned-out major league ballplayer who "forced himself into retirement by the depths of his own jerkiness" returns to sub teach physical education at his old middle school. Still trying to reclaim his fame, he starts on a comeback—righting his previous wrongs along the way—only to unwittingly sabotage his own efforts.

While not based on the life of former Major League Baseball relief pitcher John Rocker, the show's creators do cite Rocker's attitude as an inspiration. Former major league pitcher Mitch "Wild Thing" Williams has often been cited as the inspiration for the Powers character, though Williams himself has disavowed any connection. Explaining the tone of the show, McBride has stated that he and his fellow co-creators had intended to "make fun of a South where you could learn an ancient martial art like Taekwondo in a shopping center next to a tanning salon."

== Cast ==
=== Main cast ===
- Danny McBride as Kenny Powers
- Steve Little as Steven Bernard "Stevie" Janowski
- Katy Mixon as April Buchanon (seasons 1 & 4, recurring seasons 2–3)
- John Hawkes as Dustin Powers (season 1, recurring seasons 2–4)
- Jennifer Irwin as Cassie Powers (season 1, recurring seasons 2–4)
- Andy Daly as Terrence Cutler (season 1, recurring seasons 2–3)
- Ben Best as Clegg (season 1, recurring season 2)
- Elizabeth De Razzo as Maria Janowski (seasons 2–4)
- Ana de la Reguera as Vida (season 2)
- Michael Peña as Sebastian Cisneros (season 2)
- Marco Rodríguez as Roger Hernandez (season 2)
- Efren Ramirez as Catuey (season 2)
- Ken Marino as Guy Young (season 4)
- Tim Heidecker as Gene (season 4)
- Jillian Bell as Dixie (season 4)

=== Recurring cast ===
- Adam Scott as Pat Anderson (seasons 1–2)
- Will Ferrell as Ashley Schaeffer (season 1, season 3)
- Craig Robinson as Reg Mackworthy (season 1, season 3)
- Sylvia Jefferies as Tracy (seasons 1–2)
- Bo Mitchell as Wayne Powers (seasons 1–4)
- Ethan Alexander McGee as Dustin Powers Jr. (seasons 1-4)
- Don Johnson as Eduardo Sanchez Powers (seasons 2–3)
- Marlene Forte as Soledad Sanchez (season 2)
- Erick Chavarria as Casper (seasons 2–3)
- Matthew McConaughey as Roy McDaniel (seasons 2–3)
- Jerry Minor as Jamie Laing (seasons 2–4)
- Deep Roy as Aaron (season 2)
- Joaquin Cosío as Hector (season 2)
- Eduardo "Piolín" Sotelo as Announcer (season 2)
- Alex ter Avest as Andrea (season 3)
- Jason Sudeikis as Shane Gerald/Cole Gerald (season 3)
- Jon Michael Hill as Darnell (season 3)
- Ike Barinholtz as Ivan Dochenko (season 3)
- Lily Tomlin as Tammy Powers (season 3)
- Jon Reep as Jed Forney (season 4)
- Omar Dorsey as Dontel Benjamin (season 4)

== Episodes ==
Season	Episodes	Originally released	
Season	Episodes	First released	Last released
1	6	February 15, 2009	March 22, 2009
2	7	September 26, 2010	November 7, 2010
3	8	February 19, 2012	April 15, 2012
4	8	September 29, 2013	November 17, 2013

=== Season 1 (2009) ===
No. overall	No. in season	Title	Directed by	Written by	Original release date	U.S. viewers (millions)
1	1	"Chapter 1"	Jody Hill	Ben T. Best & Jody L. Hill & Danny R. McBride	February 15, 2009	0.671
Kenny Powers, a brash former baseball pitcher whose career has fizzled out, returns to his hometown but immediately discovers that he is not as respected as he had hoped. He becomes a substitute gym teacher at his former middle school while planning his return to the majors. Power's former teenage flame, April Buchanon, is now teaching at the same school. The montage in the intro features the song "Death Is the Answer" by Early Man, and also featured in the episode is "Your Touch" by The Black Keys, "Changed the Locks" by Lucinda Williams, and "Black Betty" by Ram Jam.
2	2	"Chapter 2"	David Gordon Green	Ben T. Best & Jody L. Hill & Danny R. McBride	February 22, 2009	N/A
Kenny Powers tries to cash in by becoming the spokesman for a luxury car dealership. After an embarrassing scene at the dealership, Powers acquires a sidekick in the form of music teacher Stevie Janowski. Powers appears at a school dance and declares his love for April while high on ecstasy. Features guest appearance of Will Ferrell. Features the song "Vamp" by Trentemoller. End credits music is "The Organist Entertains" by Tindersticks.
3	3	"Chapter 3"	David Gordon Green	Ben T. Best & Jody L. Hill & Danny R. McBride	March 1, 2009	N/A
After Kenny sets Stevie up to take the rap for his own alcohol-fueled car crash, Kenny hires Stevie as his assistant. Thinking it's worth a lot of money, Kenny has his sister-in-law Cassie list memorabilia from his baseball career on eBay, and he begins training and using steroids again. Features the song "For The Rest of Your Life" by Drug Rug.
4	4	"Chapter 4"	David Gordon Green	Shawn D. Harwell & Jody L. Hill & Danny R. McBride	March 8, 2009	N/A
Stevie puts together a DVD of Kenny's greatest moments in the hopes that the major leagues will notice. Later, Kenny attends a barbecue with his "fuck buddy" Tracy at April and Terrence's house where his romantic feelings for April intensify, and she shows the first signs of reciprocation, but an awkward moment gives them pause. Tracy gets Terrence, April's fiance and Kenny's boss, drunk, and he calls Kenny out for being a has-been in front of Stevie, April, Tracy, and all of their friends. Features the songs "Your Touch" by The Black Keys, "Fuck'd up" by Memphis rapper Lil Wyte and "Somerset House" by Stuart A. Staples.
5	5	"Chapter 5"	Adam McKay	Shawn D. Harwell & Jody L. Hill & Danny R. McBride	March 15, 2009	0.950
Thanks largely to Terrence's words, Kenny decides to give up on his dream of returning to professional baseball. Meanwhile, arrogant car dealer Ashley comes back into the picture, along with the player who ended Kenny's career, Reg Mackworthy, whose own career has been sidelined thanks to gambling charges. Features guest appearances of Will Ferrell, Craig Robinson and Gina Gershon. Features the songs "Pour Man'" by Lee Hazlewood and "Love Will Turn You Around" by Kenny Rogers.
6	6	"Chapter 6"	Jody Hill	Shawn D. Harwell & Jody L. Hill & Danny R. McBride	March 22, 2009	0.904
Kenny gets a contract offer from a member of Tampa's front office and in true Kenny Powers fashion, he subsequently burns a few bridges. The Tampa Bay Rays become the first MLB team to lend their official logo to the show; it appears on the 'black' credit card that the team representative presents as his credentials. Just before he leaves town to sign his contract, Powers receives a phone call from the team representative with bad news; he wasn't authorized to offer Powers a contract and did so only because he was high on cocaine. With his major league comeback over before it began, Powers is crushed. Too proud to tell April and his family, he leaves everyone with the assumption that his baseball career is still back on track. He dumps April at a gas stop and is last seen driving away with a troubled look on his face. Features the song "Sky Pilot" by The Animals, "I Remember" by Chris Brokaw along with the instrumental to Johnny Greaseball's "Amazing" featuring a sample from Shawn Lee's Ping Pong Orchestra.

=== Season 2 (2010) ===
No. overall	No. in season	Title	Directed by	Written by	Original release date	U.S. viewers (millions)
7	1	"Chapter 7"	Jody Hill	Shawn D. Harwell & Jody Hill & Danny R. McBride	September 26, 2010	1.68
Kenny resurfaces in Mexico under an alias and with a passion for cockfighting, but draws the attention of a baseball manager who wonders if Kenny Powers can still pitch. Features the songs "Bell Black Ocean" by Mark Lanegan and "Goin' Down South" by R.L. Burnside.
8	2	"Chapter 8"	Jody Hill	Shawn D. Harwell & Jody Hill & Danny R. McBride	October 3, 2010	1.54
Charros owner Sebastian Cisneros agrees to pull out all the stops in promoting Kenny Powersʼ return to organized baseball, but Kenny loses motivation after learning a secret about April from an old friend. Features the songs "Real American" by Rick Derringer and "I'm Not the One" by The Black Keys.
9	3	"Chapter 9"	David Gordon Green	Shawn D. Harwell & Jody Hill & Danny R. McBride	October 10, 2010	1.24
Puzzled by the Mexican fansʼ lukewarm reception, Kenny starts a grassroots PR campaign to burnish his image, but it takes a vintage Powers flare-up to bring the crowd to its feet. Kenny makes inroads with Vida by inviting her to Sebastianʼs yacht party. End credits music is "Hubbards Hill" by Tindersticks.
10	4	"Chapter 10"	Jody Hill	Shawn D. Harwell & Jody Hill & Danny R. McBride	October 17, 2010	1.17
Though Charros fans respond to Kenny, he is warned by Roger about the perils of showboating. Kenny learns he has serious competition in his courtship of Vida. Features the Richard Swift songs "Field Painting" and "Knee-High Boogie Blues."
11	5	"Chapter 11"	David Gordon Green	Shawn D. Harwell & Jody Hill & Danny R. McBride	October 24, 2010	1.44
Kenny considers a new full-time life working in Mexico. Features the song "Let's Go Everywhere" by Medeski, Martin and Wood. End credits music is "I Heard It Through the Grapevine" by The Slits.
12	6	"Chapter 12"	David Gordon Green	Shawn D. Harwell & Jody Hill & Danny R. McBride	October 31, 2010	1.06
Kenny settles some old scores and shows Mexico what heʼs really made of. End credits music is "Comforting Sounds" by Mew.
13	7	"Chapter 13"	Jody Hill	Shawn D. Harwell & Jody Hill & Danny R. McBride	November 7, 2010	1.35
Kenny and Stevie return to Shelby with Maria and Kenny asks where to find April at the school. However, it turns out she has started to work at real estate, and Kenny is surprised when a furious April wants him out of her life, and noticing she is pregnant, assuming it was with another man. Defeated, he publishes his memoir, and orders Stevie to give a copy to April, before heading off to Myrtle Beach to play for the Mermen. Just as he's about to leave, April tells Kenny that the child is actually his, and they head off to eat. Features The Dead Weather songs "Blue Blood Blues" and "Hustle and Cuss", as well as "Ask the Dust" by Soulsavers, and "Think I'm Coming Down" by Lee Hazlewood. End credits music is "He's Alright" by Kurt Vile.

=== Season 3 (2012) ===
No. overall	No. in season	Title	Directed by	Written by	Original release date	U.S. viewers (millions)
14	1	"Chapter 14"	Jody Hill	Jody Hill & Danny R. McBride & Josh Parkinson	February 19, 2012	1.27
After a great start to his season with the Myrtle Beach Mermen, Kenny returns home for his son's first birthday. April then comes to Myrtle Beach and after a night out with Kenny, she leaves him with more than just a hangover.
15	2	"Chapter 15"	David Gordon Green	Jody Hill & Danny R. McBride & Harris Wittels	February 26, 2012	1.10
Kenny attempts to track down April to no avail and also fails in pawning Toby off on his brother. Realizing he will need help if he is to raise his child, Kenny tries to convince Stevie to rejoin him. However, he must first rescue Stevie from the clutches of his new employer, a vengeful Ashley Schaeffer.
16	3	"Chapter 16"	Jody Hill	John Carcieri & Jody Hill & Danny R. McBride	March 4, 2012	0.882
Pro scout Roy McDaniel arrives in Myrtle Beach to ask Kenny to mentor Ivan Dochenko, a promising young Russian pitching prospect. Stevie lays down the ground rules for his return to Kenny's team while grappling with Shane and Kenny's relationship.
17	4	"Chapter 17"	David Gordon Green	Jody Hill & Danny R. McBride & Josh Parkinson	March 11, 2012	0.990
Kenny thinks his son Toby is cursed and might be to blame for a recent run of bad luck, and later tries to bond with Shane's puritanical family. Meanwhile, Stevie is racked with guilt.
18	5	"Chapter 18"	Jody Hill	Jody Hill & Danny R. McBride & Harris Wittels	March 18, 2012	0.725
Kenny is shocked when he receives some unexpected visitors, and in a desperate attempt to regain control over his team, he plans the ultimate Independence Day celebration. Stevie struggles with his guilt and makes a confession.
19	6	"Chapter 19"	David Gordon Green	John Carcieri & Jody Hill & Danny R. McBride	March 25, 2012	0.975
Stevie continues to grieve over what he has lost, while Kenny attempts to come to terms with the challenging responsibilities he faces as a father and as a man. He decides to take his chances with a brand new pitch.
20	7	"Chapter 20"	Jody Hill	John Carcieri & Jody Hill & Danny R. McBride	April 8, 2012	1.15
Desperate to return to the mound, Kenny attempts to get back in the good graces of his manager, but his quest for redemption is complicated by several unseen obstacles. A broken-hearted Stevie tries to win back Maria's love.
21	8	"Chapter 21"	Jody Hill	Jody Hill & Danny R. McBride & Josh Parkinson	April 15, 2012	1.14
While Kenny attempts to handle the current path his life seems to be taking, an unanticipated and suspicious turn of events changes the future he was certain he had as a minor-league pitcher with the Myrtle Beach Mermen.

=== Season 4 (2013) ===
No. overall	No. in season	Title	Directed by	Written by	Original release date	U.S. viewers (millions)
22	1	"Chapter 22"	Jody Hill	Hayes Davenport & Jody Hill & Danny R. McBride	September 29, 2013	0.693
After faking his death, Kenny Powers is now a family man—with his wife, April, two little kids and a home in the suburbs. He works at a car rental company, and encounters Guy Young, another former baseball player who runs a successful sports-talk show. Kenny is invited for a night out with Guy and other former sports stars friends, and decides that he would like to pursue fame once again.
23	2	"Chapter 23"	Jody Hill	Jody Hill & Danny R. McBride & Carson Mell	October 6, 2013	0.820
Kenny discusses a career move with Guy Young and tries to coax Stevie back to the Powers team.
24	3	"Chapter 24"	David Gordon Green	John Carcieri & Jody Hill & Danny R. McBride	October 13, 2013	0.753
An overnight trip to a water park is a wholesome treat from Kenny to his family and friends, but it sets the stage for an evening of debauchery.
25	4	"Chapter 25"	David Gordon Green	Jody Hill & Danny R. McBride & Justin Nowell	October 20, 2013	N/A
Kenny makes good on a threat to Gene. Stevie finds Kenny a charity to promote for Guy's dragon boat race. Toby uses his dad as a role model to summon the courage to feed his new pet.
26	5	"Chapter 26"	Jody Hill	Hayes Davenport & Jody Hill & Danny R. McBride	October 27, 2013	0.776
April convinces Kenny to attend couples therapy. Kenny and Stevie lay out a business plan to take advantage of the former's resurgence.
27	6	"Chapter 27"	David Gordon Green	Jody Hill & Danny R. McBride & Carson Mell	November 3, 2013	N/A
Kenny gets rattled when Guy introduces a new wild card to the show. Stevie recruits Maria to help promote Kenny's side business. April reaches the end of her rope with "Famous Kenny."
28	7	"Chapter 28"	Jody Hill	John Carcieri & Jody Hill & Danny R. McBride	November 10, 2013	N/A
Kenny finds his personal travails taking a toll at work. Stevie keeps up appearances in the face of adversity. Dustin and Cassie help Kenny learn a valuable Christmas lesson.
29	8	"Chapter 29"	Jody Hill	John Carcieri & Jody Hill & Danny R. McBride	November 17, 2013	0.899
At his boss' insistence, Kenny returns a favor. Stevie offers revisions to Kenny's life story. April weighs a big decision.

== Production ==
Production on the second season of the show began in May 2010. The setting moved to Mexico, with shooting actually occurring in Gurabo, Puerto Rico. The new season brought several changes to the cast, including new faces Michael Peña and Ana de la Reguera, who play the owner of a Mexican baseball team and Kenny's new love interest, respectively. Don Johnson appeared in the role of Kenny's father, whom Kenny and Stevie managed to track down in Mexico. All of the supporting cast from the first season are absent or only make cameo appearances, with the only exception being Steve Little as Stevie Janowski, who follows Kenny to Mexico. Ben Best is not a writer for Season 2 but returns in a small role as Clegg. Adam Scott returns in two episodes as the now cocaine-free baseball executive Pat Anderson.

Actor Deep Roy joined the cast as Aaron, one of Kenny's new Mexican sidekicks. The Mexican baseball team owned by Peña's character Sebastian Cisneros, the Charros, is coached by Roger Hernandez, played by actor Marco Rodriguez. Co-director Jody Hill described the season as "a cross between the films Amores perros and The Bad News Bears". Hill directed four episodes in season two, while David Gordon Green directed three.

Season 2 premiered on September 26, 2010. Vice magazine reported on August 31, 2010 that "it's worthy of the original and is its own different, more somber beast." The writers had considered setting the second season in America; according to McBride, "at one point, we considered opening on a shot of the big sombrero at South of the Border, so you think Kenny's in Mexico. And then he would have said [voice-over tone], 'I went down to the butthole of the Carolinas.' [laughs] We actually thought about setting the entire season in Myrtle Beach instead of in Mexico. I gotta say, the Myrtle Beach idea was pretty brilliant. It would have really been something. Maybe he ends up there next season. [beat] Who knows?"

Season 3 saw Jason Sudeikis join the cast, and the returns of Matthew McConaughey as Texas scout Roy McDaniel, and Will Ferrell who reprised his role as car salesman Ashley Schaeffer. Ike Barinholtz also joined the cast as Ivan, a Russian pitcher who serves as Kenny's competition. The show was filmed in Myrtle Beach, South Carolina at TicketReturn.com Field and features Kenny as a member of a minor league baseball team called Myrtle Beach Mermen.

== Reception ==
Eastbound & Down was met with critical acclaim during its run. On Rotten Tomatoes, the first season of the show has a rating of 60%, based on 15 reviews, with an average rating of 7.3/10. The site's consensus reads, "Eastbound & Down might be too profane and obnoxious for some, but its broad humor and irreverent vibe make for some great comic moments." Metacritic gave season 1 a "generally favorable" average score of 62 out of 100, based 16 critics, and seasons 2 and 3 scores of 89 and 83 out of 100, respectively, both indicating "universal acclaim". The fourth and final season of the show holds a perfect 100% rating on Rotten Tomatoes, based on 11 critics.
