= George Washington (film) =

2000 film by David Gordon Green

- The Criterion Collection DVD cover
- Directed by: David Gordon Green
- Written by: David Gordon Green
- Produced by: Sam Froelich; David Gordon Green; Sacha W. Mueller; Lisa Muskat
- Starring: Candace Evanofski; Curtis Cotton III; Donald Holden; Damian Jewan Lee; Rachael Handy; Paul Schneider
- Cinematography: Tim Orr
- Edited by: Zene Baker; Steven Gonzales
- Music by: Michael Linnen; David Wingo
- Production companies: Youandwhatarmy Filmed Challenges; Blue Moon Film Productions; Down Home Entertainment
- Distributed by: Cowboy Pictures
- Release dates: February 11, 2000 (Berlinale); October 27, 2000 (United States)
- Running time: 90 minutes
- Country: United States
- Language: English
- Budget: $42,000
- Box office: $283,846

George Washington is a 2000 American independent Southern Gothic coming-of-age drama film written and directed by David Gordon Green in his directorial debut.

The film focuses on two groups, five multi-racial preteen friends and a laidback crew of blue collar railroad workers during a hot summer in an decaying small rural town in North Carolina and their reactions to the accidental death of a young boy in the community.

Filming took place on location in Winston-Salem, North Carolina, and primarily used local non-actors in the film's cast. The film premiered at the 50th Berlin International Film Festival and received critical acclaim.

== Plot ==
The film follows a group of kids growing up in a depressed rural town in North Carolina, as seen through the eyes of 12-year-old Nasia. After breaking up with her show-off boyfriend Buddy, she withdraws from her delinquent friends and becomes romantically interested in a strange, introverted boy named George Richardson, who is burdened by the fact that his skull never hardened after birth. Tragedy strikes when George accidentally kills Buddy, and he and his friends, Vernon and Sonya, fearing punishment, decide to hide Buddy's body. In the event's aftermath, George takes up the unlikely role of town hero.

== Cast ==
- Candace Evanofski as Nasia
- Curtis Cotton III as Buddy
- Donald Holden as George Richardson
- Damian Jewan Lee as Vernon
- Rachael Handy as Sonya
- Paul Schneider as Rico Rice
- Eddie Rouse as Damascus
- Janet Taylor as Aunt Ruth

== Production ==
George Washington marked David Gordon Green's feature film debut as a screenwriter, film director and film producer. It was also the first feature film role for actor Eddie Rouse.

== Reception ==
The film has an 84% approval rating on Rotten Tomatoes based on 63 reviews, with an average rating of 7.4/10. The website's critical consensus reads, "Languid and melancholy, George Washington is a carefully observed rumination on adolescence and rural life." On Metacritic, the film has a weighted average score of 82 out of 100, based on 19 critics, indicating “universal acclaim.” Roger Ebert of the Chicago Sun-Times selected it as one of the ten best films of 2000, as did Time and New York Times critic Elvis Mitchell.

In Roger Ebert's four star review, he called the cinematography by Tim Orr the best of the year, also writing "it is not about plot, but about memory and regret. It remembers a summer that was not a happy summer, but there will never again be a summer so intensely felt, so alive, so valuable." Jonathan Rosenbaum of the Chicago Reader gave the film a favorable review, writing "You have to bring a lot of yourself to this film if you want it to give something back, but the rewards are considerable." Mick LaSalle of the San Francisco Chronicle called it "a director's baby from the opening frames" and "not like any other movie. That, in itself, makes it something to see. Writer-director David Gordon Green, in his feature debut, has created a visually and emotionally consistent universe." Rolling Stone's Peter Travers called David Gordon Green "a writer and director of rare grace and feeling", whose directorial debut is of "startling originality that will haunt you for a good, long time." Peter Bradshaw of the The Guardian, praised the film's authenticity of the portrayal of poverty-stricken North Carolina, and compared Green to filmmaker Terrence Malick and Southern literature writers William Faulkner and Mark Twain.

Joe Leydon of Variety was one of ten critics (out of 56) to give the film a negative review, calling it an "undistinguished and uninvolving attempt to offer a rural spin on Kids".
