= Jody Hill =

American director and screenwriter

- Born: October 15, 1976 (age 49); Concord, North Carolina, U.S.
- Occupations: Director; producer; screenwriter; actor
- Years active: 2006–present
- Spouse: Collette Wolfe (m. 2012; div. 2013) Dominique Sharpe (m. 2021)

Jody Hill (born October 15, 1976) is an American director, producer, screenwriter, and actor. In 2006, he directed, co-wrote, co-produced and co-starred in his first film, The Foot Fist Way, which he based on his experience as a Taekwondo black belt and instructor. His follow-up film, Observe and Report, stars Seth Rogen and was released on April 10, 2009. Hill is co-creator, director and executive producer of the HBO series Eastbound & Down, Vice Principals, and The Righteous Gemstones.

== Career ==
Hill's first film, The Foot Fist Way, was seen by Will Ferrell and Adam McKay who bought the distributing rights to the film. Subsequently, Hill was invited to the set of Knocked Up where he met future collaborator Seth Rogen. Hill was asked to do a cameo appearance with writing partner Ben Best in Rogen's next film Superbad as Tut Long John Silver. Hill later cast Rogen as the leading man in his film, Observe and Report, which opened at number 4 at the box office. The role of Ronnie was written specifically for Rogen.

In 2009, Hill directed The Avett Brothers music video "Slight Figure of Speech", which featured Wolfe and Andy Daly. The following year he directed the parody music video Swagger Wagon as part of ad agency Saatchi & Saatchi's campaign for the Sienna SE minivan from Toyota.

In 2009, Hill co-created the HBO show Eastbound & Down, on which he acted as executive producer and directed 16 episodes. The show finished its fourth and final season in 2013.

In 2014, Hill and McBride created and began preparing the comedy series Vice Principals for HBO.

From 2019 to 2025, Hill portrayed the character Levi and directed 8 episodes of The Righteous Gemstones.

== Personal life ==
Hill is a graduate of the University of North Carolina School of the Arts. Hill was in a long-term relationship with actress Collette Wolfe, who appeared in his movies Observe and Report and The Foot Fist Way. The couple eventually married in 2012 in Cabo San Lucas, and divorced in 2013. He has been married to Dominique Sharpe since October 16, 2021.

== Filmography ==
=== Film ===
| Year | Film | Credited as | | | | |
| Year | Film | Director | Writer | Producer | Actor | Notes |
|---|---|---|---|---|---|---|
| 2006 | The Foot Fist Way | Yes | Yes | Yes | Yes | Mike McAlister |
| 2009 | Observe and Report | Yes | Yes | No | No | |
| 2018 | The Legacy of a Whitetail Deer Hunter | Yes | Yes | Yes | No | Executive producer |
| TBA | Famous | Yes | No | No | No | Filming |

=== Television ===
| Year | Program | Credited as | | | | |
| Year | Program | Director | Writer | Executive Producer | Actor | Notes |
|---|---|---|---|---|---|---|
| 2009 | Eastbound and Down | Yes | Yes | Yes | Yes | Also Creator |
| 2009 | Real Comedy: Observe and Report | No | No | No | Yes | Himself |
| 2016 | Vice Principals | Yes | Yes | Yes | No | Also Creator |
| 2019 | The Righteous Gemstones | Yes | No | Yes | Yes | Levi (recurring character) |
| 2022 | Peacemaker | Yes | No | No | No | Episode: "Chapter 4: The Choad Less Traveled" |

Acting credits

| Year | Title | Role | Notes |
|---|---|---|---|
| 2007 | Superbad | Tut Long John Silver | |
| 2019–2025 | The Righteous Gemstones | Levi | Recurring Role |
