= Nobody's Stronger Than Forgiveness =

- Task episode
- Episode no.: Season 1 Episode 3
- Directed by: Salli Richardson-Whitfield
- Written by: Brad Ingelsby
- Cinematography by: Elie Smolkin
- Editing by: Amy E. Duddleston
- Original air date: September 21, 2025
- Running time: 61 minutes

Guest appearances
- Isaach De Bankolé as Daniel Georges; Stephanie Kurtzuba as Donna; Margarita Levieva as Eryn; Colin Bates as Shane McReynolds; Dominic Colón as Breaker; Ben Doherty as Sam; Oliver Eisenson as Wyatt Prendergast; Kennedy Moyer as Harper Prendergast; Elvis Nolasco as Freddy Frias; Mickey Sumner as Shelley Driscoll; Mireille Enos as Susan Brandis

Episode chronology
| ← Previous "Family Statements" | Next → "All Roads" |

"Nobody's Stronger Than Forgiveness" is the third episode of the American crime drama television series Task. The episode was written by series creator Brad Ingelsby, and directed by executive producer Salli Richardson-Whitfield. It was first broadcast on HBO in the United States on September 21, 2025, and also was available on HBO Max on the same date.

The series is set in Delaware County, Pennsylvania, and follows an FBI agent, Tom Brandis, who is put in charge of a task force to end a string of violent robberies of biker gang "trap houses" undertaken by an unassuming family man, Robbie Prendergrast. In the episode, Robbie and his accomplice Cliff try to find ways to sell the fentanyl they found during their last robbery, in which three gang members and their friend "Peaches" were killed, while Tom finds a new lead in the case.

According to Nielsen Media Research, the episode was seen by an estimated 0.259 million household viewers and gained a 0.04 ratings share among adults aged 18–49. The episode received mostly positive reviews from critics, who praised the performances and climax.

== Plot ==
Confronted by Maeve about Sam, Robbie admits that he has been robbing Dark Hearts trap houses. He wants revenge for the murder of his brother Billy by Jayson, and he is ashamed of his inability to provide a better life for his children, who have been motherless since his wife walked out on them. He tells Maeve that he will get more than a million dollars from the latest robbery, which will allow all of them to leave the situation behind.

Jayson and Perry visit Freddie Frias, a Philadelphia drug kingpin who has done business with the Dark Hearts. They ask for his help in recovering the stolen fentanyl, warning him that if this is not done other criminal gangs will encroach on their territory and eventually on his as well. He demands a 50% discount on purchasing the fentanyl in return for his aid. Meanwhile, Robbie and Cliff meet with their secret source within the Dark Hearts, Jayson's wife Eryn, who has been providing them with information to facilitate their robberies. She warns them that trying to sell the fentanyl now will alert the Dark Hearts and place them all in even greater danger. Without other options, Robbie and Cliff visit Cliff's friend from prison, Ray Lyman, for help in moving the fentanyl. He promises to contact Lee Whitehead, a man tied to Colombians who are competitors of the Dark Hearts.

Emily visits her brother Ethan in prison. He is remorseful about causing Susan's death and resigned to whatever happens at his upcoming sentencing hearing. He is aware that Tom came to the prison to deliver his suit for the hearing but refused to visit him.

Tom and his team learn that one of the guns used to shoot the Dark Hearts members who died in the latest trap house robbery was also used by the Dark Hearts themselves during a shooting in Reading back in 2017, suggesting that the gun was procured from a Dark Hearts member who is in league with the robbers. Tom and Anthony approach Jayson and Perry to ask for assistance in locating Sam, but are rudely rebuffed. Aleah and Lizzie meet with co-workers of Kenny "Peaches" Pollard at a tree surgery business to offer a reward for information about those who abducted Sam. A co-worker, Denny, reveals that Kenny bragged about robbing trap houses with Cliff, who used to work at the same company. Aleah and Lizzie report to Tom, and he decides to raid Cliff's house right away in hopes of rescuing Sam.

That night the task force enters Cliff's house and finds that it is being burgled by two masked intruders. A fight occurs in which Tom suffers a concussion, Lizzie freezes when her help is needed, and Tom's assailant is finally subdued by Anthony. The burglars are Ray and his wife Shelley, who have broken in to steal the fentanyl to sell themselves. Aleah convinces Shelley to confess after disclosing her own experience with domestic abuse. Ray admits that he promised to contact Cliff for a meet-up with Whitehead, but is unable to remember Robbie's name. Using Ray's phone, Tom sets up a meeting with Cliff for the next night.

Robbie drives Cliff home, but when they see the neighborhood is surrounded by police they realize Cliff has been identified as one of the trap house robbers and cannot return there. Robbie proposes that after selling the fentanyl they will depart for Canada. Tom is driven home by Aleah after refusing treatment for his head injury, to the dismay of his daughter Sara. Sara apologizes for her part in the argument with Tom and Emily about Emily's plans to speak up for Ethan at his sentencing hearing. Tom tells her that he cannot forgive Ethan for causing Susan's death and does not want him to come back. Emily, just returning home, overhears this and is distraught.

In the morning, Tom is informed by Agent Easley that shortly after the raid on Cliff's house a car was parked nearby belonging to Dark Hearts Lieutenant Brandon Symentz - suggesting that someone on Tom's team leaked information to the Dark Hearts. As the team convenes, Tom looks at each one, wondering if he or she could be responsible for the leak.

== Production ==
=== Development ===
The episode was written by series creator Brad Ingelsby, and directed by executive producer Salli Richardson-Whitfield. This marked Ingelsby's third writing credit, and Richardson-Whitfield's first directing credit.

=== Writing ===
Thuso Mbedu explained that the scene where Aleah confesses her past with Shelley was part of her audition, "A lot went into just crafting that moment [while shooting], because again, I don't want to play into what I think would pull on certain heart strings at any moment. It was actually [important] for me to try to lean away from the tears more than anything. And I was able to collaborate with Salli [Richardson-Whitfield] because she directed that episode in a way that was meaningful." She added, "This is a character who's lived through this trauma, but it's her first time talking about it. It's not a weapon that she uses to gain an up in investigations. She is still reconciling within herself but is using it to help others."

=== Filming ===
According to Richardson-Whitfield, the raid sequence and chase were used to show how Lizzie struggles with her position, "We know that she's nervous. We know she's going through different things. And we have to remind the actor, I have to remind myself, let's not forget these story points."

== Reception ==
=== Viewers ===
In its original American broadcast, "Nobody's Stronger Than Forgiveness" was seen by an estimated 0.259 million household viewers with a 0.04 in the 18–49 demographics. This means that 0.04 percent of all households with televisions watched the episode. This was a 19% increase in viewership from the previous episode, which was seen by an estimated 0.217 million household viewers with a 0.02 in the 18–49 demographics.

=== Critical reviews ===
"Nobody's Stronger Than Forgiveness" earned mostly positive reviews from critics. Caroline Siede of The A.V. Club gave the episode a "B+" grade and wrote, "Individually, I like pretty much every scene we get in “Nobody's Stronger Than Forgiveness.” But, taken together, I'm not sure they add up to a particularly cohesive episode — even in a “this is one chapter of a seven-hour movie” way."

Grace Byron of Vulture gave the episode a 3 star rating out of 5 and wrote, "After a strong second episode, Task backs down on its most compelling elements and works overtime to set up what will inevitably be its second wind. Mare of Easttown was often like this, too, continually rewriting its rules as it went, but Task usually feels top-heavy with exposition, relying too heavily on its powerhouse actors." Josh Rosenberg of Esquire wrote, "Wouldn't you believe it, Task spends the end of episode 3 turning the dial up another notch to 12. We were already at 11 with the missing boy chase last episode. Now, with the news that there might be a mole in Tom's task force, we're at 12."

Helena Hunt of The Ringer wrote, "Task might have made viewers feel like they were in on the loyalties and identities of all the key players from the get-go; after all, we've known for a while who's responsible for the robberies and how the gang's and the FBI's investigations are going." Carly Lane of Collider gave the episode an 8 out of 10 rating and wrote, "This week's episode, "Nobody's Stronger Than Forgiveness," written by Ingelsby and directed by Salli Richardson Whitfield, crafts an even more tangled web around the show's ensemble, making a collision course feel all but inevitable."

=== Accolades ===
TVLine named Tom Pelphrey the "Performer of the Week" for the week of September 27, 2025, for his performance in the episode. The site wrote, "Robbie worked hard to unload the drugs he suddenly had on his hands, and Pelphrey let us see the absolute mountain of pressure weighing down on Robbie's shoulders. Then his eyes got wide and dreamy as Robbie opened up to Cliff about his dreams of escaping to Canada. But we keep coming back to that scene in the car, which just underlined how fascinating a character Pelphrey has created in Robbie — and how damn riveting Task has become each week."
