= Vagrants (Task) =

- Task episode
- Episode no.: Season 1 Episode 5
- Directed by: Jeremiah Zagar
- Story by: Brad Ingelsby; David Obzud
- Teleplay by: Brad Ingelsby
- Cinematography by: Alex Disenhof
- Editing by: Keiko Deguchi
- Original air date: October 5, 2025
- Running time: 62 minutes

Guest appearances
- Stephanie Kurtzuba as Donna; Margarita Levieva as Eryn; Mickey Sumner as Shelley Driscoll; Colin Bates as Shane McReynolds; Dominic Colón as Breaker; Ben Doherty as Sam; Elvis Nolasco as Freddy Frias

Episode chronology
← Previous "All Roads"	Next → "Out beyond ideas of wrongdoing and rightdoing, there is a river."

"Vagrants" is the fifth episode of the American crime drama television series Task. The episode was written by series creator Brad Ingelsby from a story by Ingelsby and David Obzud, and directed by executive producer Jeremiah Zagar. It was first broadcast on HBO in the United States on October 5, 2025, and also was available on HBO Max on the same date.

The series is set in Delaware County, Pennsylvania, and follows an FBI agent, Tom Brandis, who is put in charge of a task force to end a string of violent robberies of biker gang "trap houses" undertaken by an unassuming family man, Robbie Prendergrast. In the episode, Robbie sets off a new plan to flee, while Tom gains a new lead in Sam's kidnapping.

According to Nielsen Media Research, the episode was seen by an estimated 0.307 million household viewers and gained a 0.04 ratings share among adults aged 18–49. The episode received critical acclaim, who praised the scenes between Tom and Robbie, performances, and cliffhanger.

== Plot ==
The morning after Cliff's death, Robbie bursts into Ray's house to confront him for setting up the meeting at which Cliff was attacked by the Dark Hearts. Ray is absent, and Shelley reveals the FBI arrested him two days ago, raising the question of who actually set up the meeting with Cliff. Shelley offers to connect Robbie with someone who can help move the fentanyl, but Robbie is cautious about trusting her.

Perry and Jayson return to Jayson's house after disposing of Cliff's remains. While there, Perry secretly places a tracking device on Eryn’s car. He then visits Maeve, claiming he wants her father Billy's club jacket for an upcoming gathering at which the club's "fallen brothers" will be commemorated. She hides Sam in a shed, and Perry is unaware that Sam is there. Before he leaves, however, Perry notices a photo of Robbie and Cliff in the kitchen.

Robbie meets with Eryn. When she tells him Jayson came home that morning "covered in blood," Robbie realizes Cliff has been killed by the Dark Hearts and is overwhelmed with shock and grief. He leaves her to take the fentanyl to Freddie, who pretends to be interested but secretly alerts Jayson.

Alexander Jovanovic, the pedestrian who was beaten by Robbie, visits the FBI to help their sketch artist create a picture of Robbie. DNA analysis reveals that the bucket Sam left behind at the pond where the altercation between Robbie and Alexander took place belonged to a young woman named Maeve Prendergrast. Tom realizes that Billy Prendergrast, the murdered Dark Hearts member he was told about by Agent Easley, was Maeve's father and that she is somehow connected to the trap house robberies.

Tom passes this information to Grasso. Grasso, however, secretly meets Jayson to get Ray's phone back from him, revealing he is Jayson's informant within the task force and he provided Jayson with the phone so that Jayson could trap and kill Cliff. Grasso tells Jayson Sam is still alive. Jayson discloses that Freddie just called about a meeting Robbie wants in order to resolve the matter of the fentanyl.

Following Eryn by means of the tracking device, Perry sees Robbie driving away from his meeting with her. Perry confronts Eryn at the lake where she and Robbie talked and threatens her for lying to him; when she tries to flee, he accidentally drowns her while trying to prevent her from calling out to some nearby hikers.

Tom drives to Maeve's address to pursue the connection between her and those who kidnapped Sam. He finds Robbie there, pretends that he is working on the "cold case" of Billy's murder, and asks for a sample of Billy's DNA, playing for time because Grasso is on route to the house. Robbie becomes suspicious and holds Tom at gunpoint. He forces Tom to drive them away in his car before Grasso can get there. Both men drop their pretenses and speak frankly about their personal losses. Robbie orders Tom to leave the freeway and stop the car in an isolated patch of woods. Rather than shoot Tom, he begs Tom to do all he can to protect Maeve, then tells him to walk into the woods while he returns to the car and leaves. Maeve takes Sam to the police station and agrees to talk to Kath McGinty, but the interview is interrupted when Aleah and Lizzie report Grasso has called from Maeve's and said Tom's car is there but Tom is missing. Kath and the two task force members head out immediately in search of Tom.

After crossing the woods, Tom arrives at Locust Lake State Park, where he finds a number of families picnicking. He borrows a phone to talk to Emily and Sara, who are both delighted he is safe. He is later picked up by McGinty and the task force, and they drive to the last known location of Robbie's car, a spot near a remote cabin that once belonged to Billy. They arm themselves and walk off to search for Robbie. Robbie arrives at the cabin, unaware that the Dark Hearts, tipped off by Freddie, are coming. As Robbie stands by a nearby lake, deep in thought, Tom confronts him from a distance at gunpoint. He asks Robbie to surrender, but, unwilling to do so, Robbie raises his gun at Tom.

== Production ==
=== Development ===
The episode was written by series creator Brad Ingelsby from a story by Ingelsby and David Obzud, and directed by executive producer Jeremiah Zagar. This marked Ingelsby's fifth writing credit, Obzud's second writing credit, and Zagar's third directing credit.

=== Writing ===
Ingelsby said that as he considered the real identity of the FBI informant, he picked Grasso "because he's sort of a lapsed Catholic who still wants to believe. He's almost always asking Tom, “Hey, convince me. I've left the church.” Maybe [the church] let him down in a way. That's what I always felt in Grasso—a guy that was striving to believe. But there's such a shame in him."

On the car conversation between Tom and Robbie, Tom Pelphrey explained, "What's really beautiful about it is that the scene that Brad wrote is a very surface-level scene. They're not talking about any of the important things that they're actually thinking about. They're not showing how they're feeling about the things that are really happening."

Jamie McShane explained that Perry had no intention of killing Eryn, adding "He tells her that he gave her a clean way out of her situation, and now they have to handle it differently. When he tells her to go, he's telling her that he's taking her back to confess to Jayson, who will find his own way to deal with her. When she runs away, he's trying to get her until he realizes that those kids are up [on the cliff] partying and playing, and Eryn is just screaming bloody murder. He tries to get her to be quiet while he's looking up at the kids, and he's just not fully realizing what he's doing. When it hits him, he's horrified, but then within that moment, the gangster mentality clicks inside."

== Reception ==
=== Viewers ===
In its original American broadcast, "Vagrants" was seen by an estimated 0.307 million household viewers with a 0.04 in the 18–49 demographics. This means that 0.04 percent of all households with televisions watched the episode. This was a 18% increase in viewership from the previous episode, which was seen by an estimated 0.260 million household viewers with a 0.03 in the 18–49 demographics.

=== Critical reviews ===
"Vagrants" received critical acclaim. Caroline Siede of The A.V. Club gave the episode an "A" grade and wrote, "While Task hasn't exactly been a slow burn so far, it's followed something of a familiar rhythm each week: a bunch of moody character scenes, a tense action/suspense set piece in the third act, and a denouement with some sort of cliffhanger to set up the next episode. Here, however, the show explodes that structure in a thrilling, destabilizing way. If this were all happening in a season finale, it would be exciting but expected. But with two episodes left to go, it genuinely feels like anything can happen in “Vagrants,” right up through its cliffhanger climax."

Grace Byron of Vulture gave the episode a 3 star rating out of 5 and wrote, "This week's episode is bottom-heavy. The first half feels strained by the sheer number of characters it has to weed through in order to set up the show's final act. We're due for more action and less preamble. It seems like I may be in the critical minority here, but just because we want a good watering-hole show does not automatically mean Task is a good watering-hole show. It's a stopgap. Like the third lukewarm coffee of an afternoon — the taste is just there, just beyond reach." Josh Rosenberg of Esquire wrote, "With the two pointing their guns at each other and Tom yelling, “It's over,” it's one heckuva cliff-hanger to wait out until next week. Scratch that. It might just be the best cliff-hanger of the year."

Helena Hunt of The Ringer wrote, "Tom and Robbie's scenes together surely aren't quite as eventful as the standoff that's brewing between the FBI and the Dark Hearts. But it's the real payoff Task has been building to, and it'll hang over everything that happens next." Carly Lane of Collider gave the episode a 9 out of 10 rating and wrote, "the results are as devastating to watch as they are seemingly inevitable, given the way this show has been going so far. But even that character's fate isn't as surprising as what plays out in the episode's back half."

=== Accolades ===
TVLine named Mark Ruffalo the "Performer of the Week" for the week of October 11, 2025, for his performance in the episode. The site wrote, "Tom was spared in the end, and a beautiful look of wistful gratitude crossed Ruffalo's face as Tom walked up to families enjoying the lake, blissfully unaware. The episode wrapped up with a tense standoff between Tom and Robbie, guns pointed at each other — and we can honestly say we don't want either of them to pull the trigger. Ruffalo might not be playing a giant green punching machine this time, but his finely calibrated work as Tom this week packed a serious gut-punch just the same."
