= A Still Small Voice (Task) =

- Task episode
- Episode no.: Season 1 Episode 7
- Directed by: Jeremiah Zagar
- Written by: Brad Ingelsby
- Cinematography by: Alex Disenhof
- Editing by: Keiko Deguchi; Amy E. Duddleston
- Original air date: October 19, 2025
- Running time: 58 minutes

Guest appearances
- Isaach de Bankolé as Daniel Georges; Stephanie Kurtzuba as Donna; Margarita Levieva as Eryn; Ben Doherty as Sam; Oliver Eisenson as Wyatt Prendergrast; Kennedy Moyer as Harper Prendergrast; Dominic Colón as Breaker; Brian Goodman as Vincent Hawkes; Ian Merrill Peakes as Matt Kerrigan; Raphael Sbarge as Michael Dorsey; Mireille Enos as Susan Brandis

Episode chronology
← Previous "Out beyond ideas of wrongdoing and rightdoing, there is a river."	Next → —

"A Still Small Voice" is the seventh episode and first season finale of the American crime drama television series Task. The episode was written by series creator Brad Ingelsby and directed by executive producer Jeremiah Zagar. It was first broadcast on HBO in the United States on October 19, 2025, and was also available on HBO Max on the same date.

The series is set in Delaware County, Pennsylvania, and follows an FBI agent, Tom Brandis, who is put in charge of a task force to end a string of violent robberies of biker gang "trap houses" undertaken by an unassuming family man, Robbie Prendergrast. In the episode, Tom and Aleah look for evidence to prove Grasso is the source of the leak in the task force, Grasso struggles to deal with his feelings of guilt, Perry is under pressure to turn on Jayson, and Jayson tries desperately to find the money, unaware that the Dark Hearts are hunting him.

According to Nielsen Media Research, the episode was seen by an estimated 0.442 million household viewers and gained a 0.05 ratings share among adults aged 18–49. The episode received highly positive reviews that considered it a fitting closure to the storylines and praised the cast's performances.

== Plot ==
Tom tells Aleah that Grasso was accused of leaking information to the Dark Hearts several years ago. He says he believes Grasso was the source of the leak to the Dark Hearts about their current investigation as well, but that their options are limited because they have no real evidence. She persuades Tom that the two of them should go to Wissahickon Park to look for such evidence. When they visit the park the next morning, they find the stolen car Cliff was driving when the Dark Hearts attacked him. In the car, they find the phone he was using at the time. They ask Kathleen to get Ray Lyman's phone so that they can prove it was used by Grasso to direct Cliff to that location. Kathleen obliges. They discover that a different phone has been substituted in evidence for Ray's phone, and that this different phone made calls from Grasso's neighborhood.

Grasso visits his sister Frankie. He tells her that "some things are going to come out" about him because he has been involved in wrongdoing that got a young woman killed. To her dismay, he admits that this wrongdoing is the source of the money he has provided to help their family, including her, in recent years. He says he can no longer live with his actions and plans to turn himself in.

Meanwhile, Eryn's body is found in the lake, where she was drowned by Perry. A chain with Perry's initials is clutched in her hand.

Vincent meets with Chief Dorsey. He tells Dorsey that due to the killing of an FBI task force member in the shootout, they must "cut ties" with anyone involved in the task force's investigation. Dorsey agrees and indicates he plans to kill Grasso and make it look like a suicide. Perry, hiding with Jayson at an isolated house owned by Donna's late mother, calls Vincent to find out "where I stand." Vincent tells him that he must kill Jayson by the next morning if he is not to face retribution from the Dark Hearts. Perry arms himself with a knife for the purpose, but cannot bring himself to kill his protege.

Vincent visits Donna. She discloses that she overheard Breaker talking with Jayson about going to see Maeve, who is Billy's daughter and Robbie's niece. Pressed by Vincent, Donna tells him where Perry and Jayson are hiding, and Vincent sends his henchmen to deal with them.

Breaker calls Jayson to reveal that Eryn's body has been found, along with evidence that Perry killed her. Perry, swimming nearby, sees Vincent's people approaching and tries to warn Jayson, but Jayson stabs him to death and then flees.

Chief Dorsey goes to Grasso's house to carry out his plan, but Grasso surprises him and holds him at gunpoint. Dorsey tells Grasso that the Dark Hearts would seek out Maeve. As they talk, Vincent arrives and shoots both Dorsey and Grasso, killing Dorsey and wounding Grasso. Grasso returns fire, killing Vincent. Grasso drives off to intervene, unaware that Kathleen is monitoring his phone and has alerted Tom.

Grasso arrives at Maeve's house, bleeding badly from his wound but able to warn her to leave immediately with the children. She is intercepted by Jayson and Breaker, who force her to reveal where she has hidden the money. Tom and Aleah arrive and enter the house looking for Maeve. Aleah is attacked by Breaker, but after a prolonged struggle, manages to shoot him. Jayson tries to escape with the money by using Maeve to shield himself from Tom and Aleah. The wounded Grasso has hidden in Jayson's car; he surprises Jayson and shoots him dead, saving Maeve.

Grasso is taken to the hospital to recover. Kathleen is told by her boss in no uncertain terms to close the case. Tom visits Grasso, who asks whether Tom, the former priest, will give him "a penance" for what he has done. Tom replies that he has never given anyone a penance because he believes people punish themselves enough for their sins. Tom decides not to tell anyone about the bag of money he found when Jayson was killed. Weeks later, Maeve takes Harper and Wyatt, and they leave town to start a new life.

At home, Tom makes peace with Emily, promising he will always keep her safe. Tom, Emily and Sara attend Ethan's sentencing hearing, where Tom has decided to make a "family impact statement." He states that despite the many challenges of dealing with Ethan's mental illness and despite Ethan's actions that caused his wife's death, he forgives and loves him and will welcome him back to their home when his sentence is over. Ethan listens silently, tears running down his face.

Some time later, Tom is informed that a foster family has taken an interest in Sam. Father Daniel urges him to think about whether it would be best for Sam to remain with the Brandis family, given the problems they may have to deal with in the future. Tom decides that it is best for Sam to have a new family. After Sam leaves, Tom repaints Ethan's room, where Sam has been staying, making it ready for the time when Ethan will come home.

== Production ==
=== Development ===
The episode was written by series creator Brad Ingelsby and directed by executive producer Jeremiah Zagar. This marked Ingelsby's seventh writing credit and Zagar's fourth directing credit.

=== Writing ===
Brad Ingelsby said that it was important for Tom to deliver the family statement, "If Emily gets on the stand and says she wants Ethan to come home, the fracture between the sisters will be even greater. It's his journey, over the course of the show. He has to get rid of the anger toward his son. All of what's happened has brought him a level of clarity he didn't have. In that moment, he realizes he has to give the statement and forgive his son." He also explained Tom's decision to let Sam live with another family, "I'm sure we'll get some pushback because I felt like an audience would want Tom to keep the kid, but I felt really, really passionate that he couldn't keep the kid. That's not what the show was about. This was about a guy who had to get the home ready for his son, and if he kept Sam, then we were betraying what the show was about, in a way."

Fabien Frankel said that Grasso's actions in the episode do not necessarily count as a redemption, "It doesn't exonerate him from what he's done. He's still responsible for all of that stuff. At least he's tried to do right by what he's done, but I don't see that as a clear conscience at all." He also stated that Tom's explanation was "the option that's the most difficult to choose." Sam Keeley said that Jayson's actions were based on impulse, which led to his character's death, "A character like Jayson belongs in a different time. He doesn't really fit in with the rules of modern society, and the club allows him a way to act on his basic needs and instincts. So retrieving that money was a way to stay in that and provide for his family and avenge his own honor and stay good with the club."

On the fight scene, Emilia Jones commented, "My adrenaline was so high... Jeremiah [Zagar], the director, was just like, 'I'm holding my breath, check the gate. We’ve got it. I don't want to see it again'... it's the end of the show, so you want people to feel that way. You want people to be kind of holding their breath." She also added, "Although Robbie burdened Maeve with a lot of responsibility, she knew that she still had someone who was looking out for her. So it's an absolute huge loss. I think that Maeve had come to the realization that Robbie's heart was always in the right place. No matter what he did, he was trying to protect his family." She also mentioned that she had hope that she would have a much better life, "I hope that with Robbie's help and the money, she can really start to think about herself and put herself and the kids first, and they can have a really comfortable life where she doesn't have to worry."

== Reception ==
=== Viewers ===
In its original American broadcast, "A Still Small Voice" was seen by an estimated 0.442 million household viewers with a 0.05 in the 18–49 demographics. This means that 0.05 percent of all households with televisions watched the episode. This was a 10% increase in viewership from the previous episode, which was seen by an estimated 0.401 million household viewers with a 0.05 in the 18–49 demographics.

=== Critical reviews ===
"A Still Small Voice" received highly positive reviews from critics. Caroline Siede of The A.V. Club gave the episode a "B+" grade and wrote, "when I think back on Task, I suspect that what will linger with me won't be the plot holes, but the unexpectedly gentle tone this intense show has found for itself. This is an episode where a surprise apartment shoot-out and a conversation about dog walking both feel equally impactful. And that's an impressive balancing act."

Grace Byron of Vulture gave the episode a 3 star rating out of 5 and wrote, "Often, Task struggled to match its ideals to its plot, but it was still a show worth watching. It will inevitably end up on many year-end lists and deservedly so. Like the family men at its core, it wasn't always perfect, but it was enough." Josh Rosenberg of Esquire wrote, "Task never answers those questions directly. How could you? But Ingelsby certainly throws Tom through as much hell as he can before his protagonist comes to a final realization. It's not easy, but we must try to put the past behind us and forgive. It's the only way forward."

Helena Hunt of The Ringer wrote, "Task was a quieter and often more meditative show, its greatness in all those in-between moments and hushed conversations. The show also didn't lean quite as hard into the specificities of Wawa and Fruit Ninja and the cluttered, cozy homes of Delco, but what it lacked in throwaway details it made up for with questions bigger than all of us: redemption, forgiveness, and how we give it to the ones who need it the most because, at least on the surface, they're the ones who deserve it the least." Carly Lane of Collider gave the episode an almost perfect 9 out of 10 rating and wrote, "This week's episode, "A Still Small Voice," written by Ingelsby and directed by Jeremiah Zagar, is more about tying up every remaining thread before the end, a quieter epilogue that leaves almost no stone unturned while providing a bittersweet resolution to a story that began with bloody vengeance."
