= Family Statements =

- Task episode
- Episode no.: Season 1 Episode 2
- Directed by: Jeremiah Zagar
- Written by: Brad Ingelsby
- Cinematography by: Alex Disenhof
- Editing by: Keiko Deguchi
- Original air date: September 14, 2025
- Running time: 59 minutes

Guest appearances
- Stephanie Kurtzuba as Donna; Margarita Levieva as Eryn; Colin Bates as Shane McReynolds; Dominic Colón as Breaker; Ben Doherty as Sam; Oliver Eisenson as Wyatt Prendergast; Kennedy Moyer as Harper Prendergast; Ian Merrill Peakes as Matt Kerrigan; Coral Peña as Meg Coyle

Episode chronology
← Previous "Crossings"	Next → "Nobody's Stronger Than Forgiveness"

"Family Statements" is the second episode of the American crime drama television series Task. The episode was written by series creator Brad Ingelsby, and directed by executive producer Jeremiah Zagar. It was first broadcast on HBO in the United States on September 14, 2025, and also was available on HBO Max on the same date.

The series is set in Delaware County, Pennsylvania, and follows an FBI agent, Tom Brandis who is put in charge of a task force to end a string of violent robberies undertaken by an unassuming family man, Robbie Prendergast. In the episode, Tom's task force begins investigating the events at the shootout, while Robbie must figure out how to proceed.

According to Nielsen Media Research, the episode was seen by an estimated 0.217 million household viewers and gained a 0.02 ratings share among adults aged 18–49. The episode received mostly positive reviews from critics, who praised the performances, intrigue and climax.

== Plot ==
Jayson, a volatile senior member of the Dark Hearts, learns about the shootout at Deric's house. Perry, the gang's leader, pays him a visit, expressing his frustration over the publicity, the robbery, and the missing child, Sam. Jayson discloses that while they lost their drug shipment, he believes the gang was after cash, not drugs. Jayson explains that the gang will need to sell the drugs to a buyer. Perry and Jayson then come to an agreement to set a trap. Both know that the FBI is on their trail, but Jayson promises to distract Tom.

Robbie and Cliff find that the duffel bag does not contain money but instead holds wrapped fentanyl. Faced with a increasingly difficult situation, Robbie opts to sell the drugs while Cliff criticizes Robbie for his poor choices during and after the robbery. Robbie assures Cliff that everything will turn out fine and tells him to buy test strips to assess the potency. Robbie is forced take care of Sam while they consider their next moves, telling Maeve that Sam is the son of a friend. As Maeve looks after Sam, she realizes he is the missing child. Meanwhile, it is revealed that Robbie's brother was a Dark Hearts member before being killed by his own crew. Tom and his task force discuss Sam and his upbringing, highlighting drug abuse and child neglect by his parents. They interrogate Peaches' family, whose real name is Kenny Pollard. Peaches' fiancé is devastated to learn about his criminal history and refuses to make any statements. While probing into the Dark Hearts, they discover the connection between the Dark Hearts and fentanyl trafficking and further suspect that the robbers had inside help. After finding out about Peaches' role in the heist, the Dark Hearts take revenge on his family.

During a therapy session, Emily discusses Tom's drinking and its impact on their relationship, as well as Ethan. She discloses that Ethan was always troubled but had a passion for sports. When Tom motivated Ethan to play on a school sports team, Ethan was devastated when he wasn't passed the ball during a game and he ran away from home. Emily admits her concerns about the possibility of Ethan being released but acknowledges his mental health challenges developed before they were adopted. While she wants to honor her adoptive family's wishes not to testify, she doubts Ethan will receive the necessary help in prison.

Later, Emily dines with Tom and his biological daughter, Sara, to discuss Ethan's impending sentencing. They get into a heated debate about whether to testify at the sentencing, with Emily explaining her reasons for wanting to testify and Sara vehemently objecting. The argument reaches a climax when a grief-stricken Sara reveals that Ethan threw Tom's wife and her own mother, Susan, down the stairs, breaking her neck. Sara asks Tom how he would feel if Ethan is released early, but he is unable to respond. Emily leaves in tears after Sara heartlessly rejects her as a family member. Angry and upset, Tom reprimands Sara and sets out to find Emily.

Maeve takes Sam shopping, leaving him at the market while she heads to her nearby job to contact the authorities and report Sam's sighting. When the authorities arrive, Maeve goes back to her car, only to find Sam there, having come back early. She attempts to evade the authorities by saying she saw the child, but Tom insists she return to identify him. She identifies another child, causing the authorities to leave with the wrong information. Maeve goes home with Sam, angrily reprimanding Robbie for their situation.

== Production ==
=== Development ===
The episode was written by series creator Brad Ingelsby, and directed by executive producer Jeremiah Zagar. This marked Ingelsby's second writing credit, and Zagar's second directing credit.

=== Writing ===
Regarding Maeve's actions in the episode, Emilia Jones explained, "It's a realization for Maeve that her whole world has just come crashing down. You know, Maeve's really stuck. She was losing her sense of identity before this happened. So this is a moment for her where she's at the end of her tether and it's really quite sad."

== Reception ==
=== Viewers ===
In its original American broadcast, "Family Statements" was seen by an estimated 0.217 million household viewers with a 0.02 in the 18–49 demographics. This means that 0.02 percent of all households with televisions watched the episode. This was a slight increase in viewership from the previous episode, which was seen by an estimated 0.214 million household viewers with a 0.02 in the 18–49 demographics.

=== Critical reviews ===
"Family Statements" earned mostly positive reviews from critics. Caroline Siede of The A.V. Club gave the episode a "B+" grade and wrote, "after a slow-burn, character-centric debut, “Family Statements” kicks the season into high gear with more than enough story to fill seven episodes. After the first installment narrowed its focus to the parallel stories of Mark Ruffalo's FBI Agent Tom Brandis and Tom Pelphrey's burglar/kidnapper Robbie Prendergast, this second one expands out to a whole world of organized crime."

Grace Byron of Vulture gave the episode a 4 star rating out of 5 and wrote, "A good crime show should feel like the toxic, luxurious relief of a well-earned cigarette break. “God, I needed this,” you sigh as you swill a nice, cold drink with your one hand while you exhale a nice cloud of smoke. Luckily, that’s precisely how “Family Statements” feels, a solid-world building effort by Brad Ingelsby that’s primarily interested in driving the plot forward. A truly expert crime serial knows how to build atmosphere, dangle new clues, and complicate our detective's troubled family life."

Josh Rosenberg of Esquire wrote, "All these characters know is drama. There's no way Tom could watch the local news or even own a TV. He listens to baseball games on the radio, for god's sake! That's all he can handle. Task might break him... if it doesn't break me first." Carly Lane of Collider gave the episode a 9 out of 10 rating and wrote, "We're only two episodes in to Brad Ingelsby's new series Task, and already the HBO crime drama is carving out a different niche for itself from its award-winning predecessor."

Helena Hunt of The Ringer wrote, "We can assume that Robbie — along with whoever his informant is — has been getting his own ill-advised payback against the club by stealing their money and now their drugs. But by getting his little form of revenge, he’s put his own family up against a bigger, more brutal one." Carissa Pavlica of TV Fanatic gave the episode a 4.15 star rating out of 5 and wrote, "The good news? The pace is sharper, the stakes higher, and the sense of dread nearly constant. The bad news? For Robbie, at least, everything that can go wrong is already starting to go wrong."
