= All Roads =

- Task episode
- Episode no.: Season 1 Episode 4
- Directed by: Salli Richardson-Whitfield
- Story by: Brad Ingelsby; David Obzud
- Teleplay by: Brad Ingelsby
- Cinematography by: Elie Smolkin
- Editing by: Keiko Deguchi
- Original air date: September 28, 2025
- Running time: 61 minutes

Guest appearances
- Stephanie Kurtzuba as Donna; Margarita Levieva as Eryn; Colin Bates as Shane McReynolds; Dominic Colón as Breaker; Ben Doherty as Sam; Oliver Eisenson as Wyatt Prendergast; Brian Goodman as Vincent Hawkes; Jack Kesy as Billy Prendergrast; Kennedy Moyer as Harper Prendergrast; Coral Peña as Meg Coyle; Raphael Sbarge as Chief Dorsey

Episode chronology
← Previous "Nobody's Stronger Than Forgiveness"	Next → "Vagrants"

"All Roads" is the fourth episode of the American crime drama television series Task. The episode was written by series creator Brad Ingelsby from a story by Ingelsby and David Obzud, and directed by executive producer Salli Richardson-Whitfield. It was first broadcast on HBO in the United States on September 28, 2025, and also was available on HBO Max on the same date.

The series is set in Delaware County, Pennsylvania, and follows an FBI agent, Tom Brandis, who is put in charge of a task force to end a string of violent robberies of biker gang "trap houses" undertaken by an unassuming family man, Robbie Prendergrast. In the episode, Tom and the task force attempt to lure Robbie's partner Cliff to a meeting to arrest him, while the Dark Hearts biker gang attempts to find him to interrogate him about his source within their gang.

According to Nielsen Media Research, the episode was seen by an estimated 0.260 million household viewers and gained a 0.03 ratings share among adults aged 18–49. The episode received mostly positive reviews from critics, who praised the tension, character development and third act.

== Plot ==
Tom and the task force meet with Grasso's chief, Michael Dorsey, and his men to plan a sting operation to catch Cliff and hopefully locate Sam. Using Ray Lyman's phone they have set up a meeting with Cliff that night at a local park, making Cliff and Robbie believe a buyer for the fentanyl will meet them there to exchange the goods for cash. The task force and Dorsey's men will conceal themselves in and around the park and arrest Cliff when he arrives.

Perry is visited by Vincent, another member of the "Mother Club," the 12 national leaders of the Dark Hearts. Vincent tells him the Mother Club has voted to terminate Jayson due to his failure to stop the trap house robberies. Desperate to save Jayson, Perry meets with Shane, part of the Delaware County club, after learning he has been acting strangely; Perry wonders whether Shane knows something that will lead to the robbers' confederate within the Dark Hearts. Shane reveals that many members of the local club have been unhappy since the execution of Billy Prendergrast because it was not, as Perry had been told, for embezzling the club's money. Instead, Jayson murdered Billy after hearing he had been sleeping with Eryn and then made up the embezzlement story for Perry's benefit. Furious, Perry brutally beats Jayson for his actions, but indicates he intends to continue trying to save him. Jayson tells Perry about the task force's plan to lure Cliff to a meeting and arrest him. Perry visits Eryn to question her about what Shane told him and accuse her of being in league with the robbers, motivated by her anger at Billy's killing. Eryn admits to an affair with Billy but denies she intended to leave Jayson or that she has betrayed the club. Perry appears to accept her story.

At FBI headquarters Tom tells Kath about the possible leak in the task force. She tells him to proceed as planned nevertheless. When he leaves, she calls someone and says "We may have a problem."

Robbie reminisces over happier times with Billy and his family at the old quarry where they often went swimming before Billy died and Robbie's wife left. Robbie goes to see Bartosz, a trucker friend of Billy, who is to help him and Cliff get to Canada. He leaves Sam and Cliff in the car. While Cliff dozes Sam walks over to a nearby pond and is spotted by a pedestrian, a man who wants to know why such a young child is there alone. Robbie returns to find Sam and an altercation occurs, ending with the pedestrian trying to take Robbie's photo and Robbie beating him up and leaving with Sam.

Robbie tells Maeve about his plan to relocate the family to Canada, but she refuses to cooperate, telling him to take Sam to the police the following day or she will do it herself.

That night, the task force and Dorsey's people position themselves in the park to await Cliff. A car shows up near the meeting location and Tom orders everyone to intercept it. However, it proves to be a couple looking for their dog. Cliff is nowhere to be seen, and having lost the element of surprise the operation is called off. Meanwhile, Cliff has driven to a different location to meet the buyer on instructions from Jayson, who has somehow obtained Ray's phone. Cliff is attacked by Jayson and the Dark Hearts, having just enough time to alert Robbie by phone before his car is forced off the road.

The Dark Hearts torture Cliff for information about his source within their club but he tells them nothing, and they find nothing in his car except a small part of the missing fentanyl shipment and a handgun. Frustrated, Jayson uses plastic wrap to suffocate Cliff to death.

Looking through old photo albums, Perry sees a picture of Billy and Maeve, with the former wearing the gun identified in the trap house shootout - the same gun just found in Cliff's car. Emily, having drank too much at a party with her coworkers, arrives home and lashes out at Tom for the conversation she overheard about Ethan. The following morning, Tom receives an e-mail with a new lead: the pedestrian who saw Sam has sent the FBI a photo of Sam with Robbie, though Robbie's face is obscured.

== Production ==
=== Development ===
The episode was written by series creator Brad Ingelsby from a story by Ingelsby and David Obzud, and directed by executive producer Salli Richardson-Whitfield. This marked Ingelsby's fourth writing credit, and Richardson-Whitfield's second directing credit.

=== Writing ===
Regarding Cliff's decision to rather die than expose Robbie, Raúl Castillo said, "[Dogs are] loyal and they're true and that's very meaningful for him and his friendship to Robbie is one of the only pure and real things that he has." He added, "having Tom [Pelphrey] to play with was the greatest thing. I could just look at Tom in the eyes, and I knew that there was absolute trust and care. I was in good hands, always, with him." For his death scene, director Richardson-Whitfield said that they had a stunt performer but Castillo insisted on doing it himself. She said, "I really think it's a testimony to the trust he had for his fellow actors, for the crew, that we would protect him. Whenever your actor can do it all, it's better... It definitely, I think, gives you a visceral feeling."

== Reception ==
=== Viewers ===
In its original American broadcast, "All Roads" was seen by an estimated 0.260 million household viewers with a 0.03 in the 18–49 demographics. This means that 0.03 percent of all households with televisions watched the episode. This was a slight increase in viewership from the previous episode, which was seen by an estimated 0.259 million household viewers with a 0.04 in the 18–49 demographics.

=== Critical reviews ===
"All Roads" earned mostly positive reviews from critics. Caroline Siede of The A.V. Club gave the episode a "B+" grade and wrote, "honestly, I'd much rather just get to know these characters as people rather than keep them opaque for the sake of mystery. Task is at its best when it’s a character drama first and an FBI crime procedural second. “All Roads” helps bring the Dark Hearts side of the show into that character-driven place. Hopefully the task force can get the same treatment."

Grace Byron of Vulture gave the episode a 3 star rating out of 5 and wrote, "I feel confident in saying this is not the Zeitgeisty show that Brad Ingelsby's previous juggernaut was. It's a delicate character balancing act that isn't always paying off. Luckily, it's not all bad. It's a nice entry into the fall weather, replete with the typical high amount of empty prop coffee cups appearing at stakeouts, study sessions, and police debriefings."

Megan McCluskey of Time wrote, "As this week's episode of Task came to an upsetting close, there was no denying the walls seemed to be closing in on Robbie. But, given there are still three installments of the HBO crime drama to go, we have to assume things won't pan out exactly like they currently seem they might." Josh Rosenberg of Esquire wrote, "This is all mighty suspicious behavior, if you ask me! Either Task didn't think the audience would catch it, or I just figured it out. Your move, Ingelsby."

Helena Hunt of The Ringer wrote, "PSP Lizzie Stover recognizes that she might be the one to get in someone's way or make a critical error that lets the bad guys go free. But she's got that double edge of shame and shamelessness that comes from knowing who you are and wanting to be better. And despite all her faults, that, at least, is something to admire." Carly Lane of Collider gave the episode an 8 out of 10 rating and wrote, "This week's episode, "All Roads," written by Ingelsby and directed by Salli Richardson Whitfield, ratchets up the danger for everyone, especially when no character quite knows who they can really trust."

=== Accolades ===
TVLine named Alison Oliver as an honorable mention for the "Performer of the Week" for the week of October 4, 2025, for her performance in the episode. The site wrote, "On a show as grim and violent as HBO's Task is, we'll take our moments of levity anywhere we can get them, and Alison Oliver gave us a welcome dose of comic relief this week as state trooper Lizzie hit the local bar scene, wincing after a shot of Jaeger and happily singing along when her favorite song came on: Gwen Stefani's “The Sweet Escape.” Oliver added a subtle touch of melancholy to Lizzie as well, when she marveled at Aleah's sharpshooting skills and confessed to being a bit jealous of her: “I feel like I don’t know what my, like, one thing is.” Task has been great at reminding us that its cops aren't robotic crime-solvers; they have fears and flaws of their own. Lizzie may not be a perfect cop, but Oliver's endearingly awkward portrayal has reminded us that she's still perfectly human."
