= Cheli, Iran =

Cheli or Chali or Choli or Chaly (Persian: چلي or چالي) in Iran, may refer to:

- Chali, Heris, East Azerbaijan Province
- Chali, Malekan, East Azerbaijan Province
- Cheli-ye Olya, Golestan Province
- Chali, Hamadan
- Choli, Khuzestan
- Chali, Kohgiluyeh and Boyer-Ahmad
- Chali, Kurdistan (چالي - Chālī)
- Chali, Mazandaran (چالي - Chālī)
