= Crossings (Task) =

- Task episode
- Episode no.: Season 1 Episode 1
- Directed by: Jeremiah Zagar
- Written by: Brad Ingelsby
- Cinematography by: Alex Disenhof
- Editing by: Amy E. Duddleston
- Original air date: September 7, 2025
- Running time: 65 minutes

Guest appearances
- Isaach De Bankolé as Daniel Georges; Ben Doherty as Sam; Oliver Eisenson as Wyatt Prendergast; Michael Maize as Deric Nance; Kennedy Moyer as Harper Prendergast; Ian Merrill Peakes

Episode chronology
← Previous —	Next → "Family Statements"

"Crossings" is the series premiere of the American crime drama television series Task. The episode was written by series creator Brad Ingelsby, and directed by executive producer Jeremiah Zagar. It was first broadcast on HBO in the United States on September 7, 2025, and also was available on HBO Max on the same date.

The series is set in Delaware County, Pennsylvania, and follows an FBI agent, Tom Brandis who is put in charge of a task force to end a string of violent robberies undertaken by an unassuming family man, Robbie Prendergast.

According to Nielsen Media Research, the episode was seen by an estimated 0.214 million household viewers and gained a 0.02 ratings share among adults aged 18–49. The episode received mostly positive reviews from critics, who praised the performances, characters and shootout sequence.

== Plot ==
In Delaware County, Pennsylvania, FBI field agent Tom Brandis resides with his adopted daughter Emily. Once a priest, he became an agent and turned to alcohol after his son Ethan was found guilty of a federal offense involving the family. He maintains a friendship with priest Daniel Georges, who also questions Tom's new direction.

Robbie Prendergast and his close friend Cliff Broward work as garbage truck drivers. Robbie lives in his late brother's home, where his niece Maeve assists in caring for his children, Wyatt and Harper. Dissatisfied with their lives, Robbie and Cliff plan to rob a trap house that night, enlisting the help of their friend Peaches. The three successfully steal the money. Upon returning home, Robbie has a confrontation with Maeve, who is upset and frustrated because she sacrificed her lifestyle to take care of Robbie's kids after his ex left and never came back.

Tom's supervisor, Kathleen McGinty, updates him on multiple trap house robberies occurring throughout the counties, where many of these robberies are committed by a rogue gang osentensibly linked to a biker gang known as Dark Hearts. She cautions Tom that if this rogue gang is not apprehended, turf wars will only intensify. Since Kathleen confesses that she is being forced to retire, Tom reluctantly agrees to head a task force that includes State Trooper Elizabeth "Lizzie" Stover, Sergeant Detective Aleah Clinton, and County Detective Anthony Grasso. Following their meeting, Tom sets up a seized stash house which acts as the headquarters for the task force.

Later that night, after surveilling another trap house, Robbie, Cliff, and Peaches try to rob a dealer named Deric. However, Deric's girlfriend manages to pull off Peaches' mask, and Deric recognizes Robbie's voice. When a friend of Deric's shows up, a shootout breaks out, resulting in the deaths of the biker and Peaches. Deric manages to escape from his handcuffs. Robbie and Cliff are then forced to kill Deric and his girlfriend when they attempt to fight back. While discussing their next move, Robbie and Cliff remove their masks and are unexpectedly confronted by Deric's son, Sam.

In the early morning, Tom and the task force arrive at the house. They find the bodies but see no trace of Sam. Robbie and Cliff return home, with Robbie carrying a sleeping Sam inside.

== Production ==
=== Development ===
The episode was written by series creator Brad Ingelsby, and directed by executive producer Jeremiah Zagar.

=== Writing ===
Tom Pelphrey said that Robbie's criminal life is based on his need to supply for his family, "He's doing what he needs to do, obviously, to take care of his family. And in the meantime, the people picking up the tab, none of us are shedding any tears over it. So considering the difficult situation that Robbie's in and the circumstances, I have no problem with the way he is doing it." He also addressed his character's perception of a father figure, "he's always trying in a way that just I love. To me that's so beautiful and unique and honest. I was very moved reading Robbie."

Brad Ingelsby said the shootout was essential because "it lets an audience know that everything is on the table. So quickly they kill off a character we've come to like? Guess who else is on the chopping block? That was a decision we made early on. Owen brings so much to that character in such a short amount of time. It sets up the stakes of the piece. It helps to introduce this idea to the audience that everything is on the table in a show like this." He added, "We did a similar thing in Mare where the body doesn't turn up until the very end of the first episode. In Task, it's kind of a character piece, and at the very end, the plot takes hold."

Regarding Robbie's decision to take Sam to his house, Pelphrey explained, "Ultimately I think it was the best choice of a bunch of bad choices. There's one option that would never be on the table with Robbie, which is, you know, I don't even need to say it." Ingelsby also said, "there's a practical side to Robbie taking the kid... ‘If the cops come and get him, he's going to be able to point us out.' I also think there's a code that Robbie has. He has his own personal code. He'll do certain things, but not others."

== Reception ==
=== Viewers ===
In its original American broadcast, "Crossings" was seen by an estimated 0.214 million household viewers with a 0.02 in the 18–49 demographics. This means that 0.02 percent of all households with televisions watched the episode.

HBO later reported that the episode was seen by 3.1 million viewers across HBO and HBO Max on its first three days.

=== Critical reviews ===
"Crossings" earned mostly positive reviews from critics. Caroline Siede of The A.V. Club gave the episode a "B+" grade and wrote, "Where Mare Of Easttown was a show about motherhood, repression, and redemption, Task seems interested in fatherhood, faith, and grief. Those are slightly more common themes for the crime-drama genre. But this premiere suggests Ingelsby has a perspective (and a cast) that could make them feel fresh again."

Grace Byron of Vulture gave the episode a 3 star rating out of 5 and wrote, "While the premiere has a lot to set up in terms of the chase that will come in the proceeding episodes, it's the crisis of masculinity and male loneliness that is the strongest current running through Task — the failure of men to shoulder the obligations in their family life. But Ingelsby provides an empathetic approach; his men are surprisingly gentle, eager, almost puppy-dog-like in their dogged desires."

Josh Rosenberg of Esquire wrote, "Faith and forgiveness will likely define many of the characters' arcs as I recap this new crime drama for the next two months. We're dealing with heavy family trauma here. And somehow, the premiere deftly balances these serious subject matters with characters who sound like they're gargling marbles." Carly Lane of Collider gave the episode a 9 out of 10 rating and wrote, "Task, which drops its first episode tonight on HBO, may not be Mare of Easttown Season 2, but it has a lot to offer in its own right — star power, a compelling dual narrative, and a look into a much darker underbelly that Ingelsby's previous series only lightly scratched at. "Crossings," written by Ingelsby and directed by Jeremiah Zagar, is an hour that doesn't waste any time setting up its story, as well as the two men who will anchor it."

Helena Hunt of The Ringer wrote, "the end of “Crossings” spells real trouble for Robbie, proving that maybe it is better to wallow in your problems rather than take action to solve them, at least if that action involves robbing a motorcycle gang called the Dark Hearts. I expect Tom and Robbie to ride a seesaw of misery throughout the season; I'm a little (a lot) scared to find out who comes out on top, but I for one can't wait for the rest of this dark ride through Delaware County's trash routes and ganglands." Carissa Pavlica of TV Fanatic gave the episode a 3.25 star rating out of 5 and wrote, "The premiere is bloated, repetitive, and occasionally condescending, but beneath that is a taut thriller waiting to break free. If the series can shed the indulgence and focus on the escalating clash between Tom and Robbie, it could evolve into something truly compelling."
