= Salli =

Salli may refer to:

== People ==
=== Given name ===
- Salli Karuna (1902–1987), Finnish film actress
- Salli Richardson (born 1967), American actress and director
- Salli Saffioti (born 1976), American actress
- Salli Setta (born 1965), American restaurateur and businesswoman
- Salli Terri (1922–1996), singer
- Salli Wills, Australian artistic gymnast

=== Surname ===
- Ebru Şallı, Turkish celebrity
- Edgar Salli, Cameroonian football player
- Janne Salli (born 1977), Finnish football player
- Yousaf Salli, Pakistani socialite

== Places ==
- Salli, Armenia
- Salli, Iran
- Puka Salli, Bolivia
- Q'illu Salli, Bolivia

== Astronomy ==
- Salli family, an asteroid family
- 1715 Salli, minor planet

== Other ==
- SALLI, Finnish sex trade union
- Salli, 2024 upcoming Taiwanese film starring Esther Liu and Austin Lin

== See also ==
- Sali (disambiguation)
- Sally (disambiguation)
