= Out beyond ideas of wrongdoing and rightdoing, there is a river. =

- Task episode
- Episode no.: Season 1 Episode 6
- Directed by: Salli Richardson-Whitfield
- Story by: Brad Ingelsby; David Obzud
- Teleplay by: Brad Ingelsby
- Cinematography by: Elie Smolkin
- Editing by: Amy E. Duddleston
- Original air date: October 12, 2025
- Running time: 59 minutes

Guest appearances
- Stephanie Kurtzuba as Donna; Mickey Sumner as Shelley Driscoll; Dominic Colón as Breaker; Jack Kesy as Billy Prendergast; Raphael Sbarge as Michael Dorsey; Colin Bates as Shane McReynolds; Ben Doherty as Sam; Oliver Eisenson as Wyatt Prendergrast; Kennedy Moyer as Harper Prendergrast

Episode chronology
← Previous "Vagrants"	Next → "A Still Small Voice"

"Out beyond ideas of wrongdoing and rightdoing, there is a river." is the sixth episode of the American crime drama television series Task. The episode was written by series creator Brad Ingelsby from a story by Ingelsby and David Obzud, and directed by executive producer Salli Richardson-Whitfield. It was first broadcast on HBO in the United States on October 12, 2025, and also was available on HBO Max on the same date.

The series is set in Delaware County, Pennsylvania, and follows an FBI agent, Tom Brandis, who is put in charge of a task force to end a string of violent robberies of biker gang "trap houses" undertaken by an unassuming family man, Robbie Prendergrast. In the episode, the task force and the Dark Hearts finally come to grips with each other when both groups track Robbie to his brother Billy's cabin.

According to Nielsen Media Research, the episode was seen by an estimated 0.401 million household viewers and gained a 0.05 ratings share among adults aged 18–49. The episode received critical acclaim, with critics praising the shootout sequence, character development, closure to Robbie's arc, and performances.

== Plot ==
The task force and the Dark Hearts converge on Billy's cabin, each group looking for Robbie there and each unaware that the other is coming. When they spot each other in the woods nearby, Perry orders his men to turn around and leave, but Jayson, determined to recover the missing fentanyl, ignores him and starts shooting, causing the task force to respond. Tom, under fire from Dark Hearts members, is rescued by Robbie, who takes him to the cabin and asks him to stay while he escapes with the duffel bag containing the fentanyl. Perry reaches the cabin and he and Tom have a brutal, hand to hand fight which both men barely survive. With Perry lying on the floor stunned, Tom leaves to go after Robbie. Jayson reaches Robbie first. After Robbie throws the bag in the river, Jayson, out of ammunition, grapples fiercely with him. Robbie gains the advantage, but Jayson then pulls a knife and stabs him. Before he can finish Robbie, Tom arrives and Jayson is forced to flee. Tom gets Robbie to a police car which has just shown up and orders the officer to speed them to a hospital, but Robbie dies in Tom's arms before they can reach help.

Kathleen receives a gunshot wound in the shoulder and asks that one of the other team members go back to their car and use the police radio to call for assistance. Lizzie volunteers, but she and Grasso must evade members of the Dark Hearts to get to the car. She suffers temporary hearing loss after Grasso fires his gun close to her head. When Shane appears and aims his gun at them, Lizzie, instead of freezing as she has in the past, shoots him down, despite Grasso's pleas to stand aside. She then heads for the car at a nearby bridge. Perry and Jayson are escaping over the bridge in one of the Dark Hearts' vehicles, and Lizzie, unable to hear the vehicle coming toward her, is struck by it and fatally wounded. Perry and Jayson race away as Aleah fires through their windshield but does not succeed in stopping them. A devastated Grasso and Aleah stay with Lizzie in her dying moments.

As the remaining task force members wait for news of Kathleen at the hospital, Kathleen's FBI supervisor arrives to tell them to stand down. The Bureau will investigate the shootings, he tells them, and their assignment is now over.

Tom meets with Maeve at the police station where she is being held after bringing Sam in. He tells her of Robbie's death, and asks for help in the case. Maeve unwittingly provides a vital clue when she mentions that Cliff was told to go to a meeting at Wissahickon Park, rather than Bailey Park as the task force had arranged. Tom now understands that someone who knew about the meeting he had set up with Cliff secretly changed the location so that the Dark Hearts could abduct Cliff.

Maeve admits she called the FBI tip line about Sam and left him near the arcade in the hope they would pick him up; she relates that her plan went wrong and she took Sam back with her for fear she would be arrested and Robbie's children would be left on their own. Keeping his promise to Robbie, Tom persuades the prosecutor handling her case that she should not face charges. Maeve is released, and reunites with Wyatt and Harper. After visiting Sam at a juvenile detention center where he is being kept for lack of a better alternative, Tom decides to take him home, to the surprise of Emily and Sara. Jayson and Perry hide out at Donna's house, and that night, they return to the woods to search for the duffel bag Robbie threw in the river.

Tom visits Kathleen, who is now recovering from her wound at home. He presses her on why the FBI OPS unit is investigating the task force in a manner that goes well beyond the Bureau's standard investigation of an officer-involved shooting. She admits that when Tom told her there could be a leak within the task force, she checked on all task force members and found that Grasso was suspected of leaking information to the Dark Hearts during a previous assignment several years ago. Tom is incensed that Lizzie may have been killed because of Grasso's actions, but Kathleen tells him to let the OPS investigation "run its course."

Tom goes to see Grasso at his home. Tom suggests to him that if the Dark Hearts had not been enabled to use Ray's phone to change the meeting with Cliff, and the task force had taken Cliff into custody at Bailey Park instead, the shootout that just took place would never have happened and Lizzie would still be alive. Grasso seems very troubled by this, but stops short of admitting that he has been helping the Dark Hearts. As Tom leaves he tells Grasso, "I'm coming for you."

Tom next visits Aleah. She indignantly demands answers about the OPS investigation, feeling that the Bureau is implying the team did something wrong. Tom, intending to enlist her help in dealing with Grasso, tells her, "We got a lot to talk about."

Jayson and Perry recover Robbie's duffel bag from the river, but find it contains nothing but old magazines. Meanwhile, Maeve is visited by Shelley, who hands over a bag of cash, revealing that Robbie planned the woods meeting as a decoy and previously sold the drugs with Shelley's help.

== Production ==
=== Development ===
The episode was written by series creator Brad Ingelsby from a story by Ingelsby and David Obzud, and directed by executive producer Salli Richardson-Whitfield. This marked Ingelsby's sixth writing credit, Obzud's third writing credit, and Richardson-Whitfield's third directing credit.

The episode's title is a reference to the poem A Great Wagon by the Persian poet Rumi.

=== Writing ===
Tom Pelphrey commented on Robbie's death, "He's not interested in any unnecessary suffering. He doesn't want anybody to be hurt or killed … it's admirable the discipline of that and he follows that through to the end, because that's at the core of who he is." Mark Ruffalo said that Tom's empathy was pivotal to the scene, believing that despite his bad actions, he did not consider Robbie to be a bad person, saying "The time he spends with Robbie, he's surprised by his level of humanity, and he understands the need for revenge, loss, justice, and retribution. Things that transcend the law, which is a human thing. He has a lot of care for him in the short time they're together. He loves him, and when he dies, he sees a soul. There's an idea of last rites, baptized, and being saved, that there's no way to get to heaven, let's say, without those things."

Ingelsby explained the decision to kill off Lizzie in the episode, "The impact Lizzie leaves on the group is a profound one. What her death does is it adds a tremendous amount of guilt, in terms of Grasso's storyline. He thought he was able to manage all these things, he had this house of cards he constantly tended to, and now the house of cards has fallen down, and he's left with the guilt and shame." Alison Oliver added, "I felt like so many odds were against her. She was on her own, she was either going to get killed or wait for someone to save her, or she was going to have to just take it into her own hands and solve it, or figure it out, what she was going to do, and she does, and once you sort of make that step, then you're like, ‘Oh, I can do anything.’"

Ingelsby also commented on Grasso's actions, "I felt like the show had to subvert expectations at times. As a viewer, if I saw these scenes, I would get excited because I would go, ‘Oh, I thought those were going to be where the show was ending.’ It braces you for something completely different. Why not do something that's unexpected and hopefully still emotional? Hopefully at the end of Episode Six, we still have enough investment from the audience to carry us through see what's going to happen in Seven." Regarding the final scene with Tom, Fabien Frankel commented, "The idea is that it's Grasso's last stand. It's a true moment of defiance, even if he knows in his subconscious that he is going to turn himself in already by that point."

== Reception ==
=== Viewers ===
In its original American broadcast, "Out beyond ideas of wrongdoing and rightdoing, there is a river." was seen by an estimated 0.401 million household viewers with a 0.05 in the 18–49 demographics. This means that 0.05 percent of all households with televisions watched the episode. This was a 30% increase in viewership from the previous episode, which was seen by an estimated 0.307 million household viewers with a 0.04 in the 18–49 demographics.

=== Critical reviews ===
"Out beyond ideas of wrongdoing and rightdoing, there is a river." received critical acclaim. Caroline Siede of The A.V. Club gave the episode an "A–" grade and wrote, "There are few moves more baller than a long-delayed title drop and boy does Task earn it this week. The opening 18 minutes of this penultimate episode are a non-stop action thriller where the tension barely lets up even as we track the emotional arcs of half a dozen characters. Earlier in the season I complained about Task's ensemble being too large and its structure being too amorphous. But it turns out Brad Ingelsby was playing an ingenuous long game, setting up story arcs like dominoes only to let them fall in perfect synchronicity in the climax."

Grace Byron of Vulture gave the episode a 3 star rating out of 5 and wrote, "The losses are felt, yes, but they’re not as shocking or painful as Mare of Easttown. Perhaps the show needed a different marketing tactic. It’s just impossible not to compare the two shows, even though I admire the fact that Task is trying to do something different. This new show has just given us far too many mixed signals to remain hopeful." Josh Rosenberg of Esquire wrote, "Episode 6 feels worse than dropping all your red cherry-flavored water ice on your new white shoes, but that's what happens when you jostle the cup around as much as Task has for the past five episodes. We saw the signs. It was inevitable — and Task is still damn good TV. But that doesn't make it hurt any less."

Helena Hunt of The Ringer wrote, "The penultimate episode of Task brought the guns-blazing firestorm everyone had been anticipating — and some deaths that we'd surely all hoped would never happen. After a season of buildup, the Dark Hearts, the FBI task force, and Robbie Prendergrast all converge in Bushkill, and a melee, naturally, ensues." Carly Lane of Collider gave the episode a perfect 10 out of 10 rating and wrote, "What proves shocking in this week's hour, titled "Out beyond ideas of wrongdoing and rightdoing, there is a river," written by Ingelsby and masterfully directed by Salli Richardson Whitfield, is that one of the show's most faultless parties gets caught in the crossfire — and the ripple effects will definitely be felt heading into Task's conclusion."
