= Chaly =

Chaly may refer to:

- Chaly (surname)
- Chaly Jones (born 1977)
- Shali, East Azerbaijan
- Cheli, Iran (disambiguation) (various places)
- "Chaly", mascot of the band, Overkill, a skeletal bat with a skull-like face
