= Shali =

Shali or Shalli may refer to:

== Places ==
- Shali, Afghanistan, an inhabited locality in Afghanistan
- Shali, Bhutan, an inhabited locality in Bhutan
- Shali, Egypt, medieval city ruins in Egypt
- Shali, East Azerbaijan, a village in East Azerbaijan Province, Iran
- Shali, Kohgiluyeh and Boyer-Ahmad, a village in Kohgiluyeh and Boyer-Ahmad Province, Iran
- Shali, Chechen Republic, a town in Shalinsky District of the Chechen Republic in Russia
- Shali, Republic of Tatarstan, a rural selo in Pestrechinsky District of the Republic of Tatarstan in Russia
- Shali River, a river on which the census town of Beliatore in India stands

== People ==
- Shali Shen, researcher who first isolated the HEPACAM gene
- Sally Chen (born 1948), actress playing Tian's mother in Dark Tales, a Hong Kong television drama
- Yu Sha-li, who played Shagu in The Brave Archer 2, a 1978 Hong Kong movie

== Characters ==
- Shali, alternative name of Shalia, a character from The World God Only Knows manga

== See also ==
- Sali (disambiguation)
- Shalinsky (disambiguation)
