= Cheli (disambiguation) =

Cheli is jargon found in Madrid, Spain.

Cheli may also refer to:

- Cheli (surname)
- Cheli (footballer) (born 1979), Spanish footballer
- Cheli, a former name of Jinghong
- Cheli, Iran (disambiguation)
