= Sali =

Sali may refer to:

== Places ==
- Sali, Algeria, a town and commune in Reggane District, Adrar Province, south-central Algeria
- Sali, Croatia, a village and a municipality in Zadar County, Croatia
- Sali, Ethiopia, a town in Lay Gayint in the Amhara Region of Ethiopia
- Shali, East Azerbaijan, also Sali, a village in Heris County, East Azerbaijan Province, Iran
- Sali-ye Bozorg, also known as Sālī, a village in Khorramabad County, Lorestan Province, Iran
- Sali-ye Kuchek, also known as Salī, a village in Khorramabad County, Lorestan Province, Iran
- Saly, also known as Sali, a seaside resort area in Thiès Region on the Petite Côte of Senegal

== Rivers ==
- Salí River, Argentina
- Sali River (West Bengal)

== People ==
=== People with the given name ===
- Sali Noyan (13th-century), Mongol general
- Sali Berisha (born 1944), former president and prime minister of Albania
- Sali Herman (1898-1993), Swiss-born Australian artist
- Sali Kelmendi (1947–2015), Albanian politician
- Sali Subam (born 1955), Papua New Guinean politician
- Sali Turan (born 1949), Turkish painter

=== People with the surname ===
- Baba Sali (Rabbi Israel Abuhatzeira; 1890-1984), Moroccan rabbi
- Bill Sali (born 1954), American politician
- Hamsiraji Marusi Sali (died 2004), Filipino terrorist
- Jainal Antel Sali Jr. (1964-2007), Filipino terrorist
- Safee Sali (born 1984), Malaysian footballer
- Negiat Sali (born 1953), Romanian economist
- Ziynet Sali (born 1975), Turkish Cypriot singer

== Other uses ==
- Sali (weapon), a traditional Fijian war club

== See also ==
- Salii, the "leaping priests" of Ancient Rome
- Salli (disambiguation)
- Sally (disambiguation)
- Shali (disambiguation)
