= Shalinsky =

Shalinsky (masculine), Shalinskaya (feminine), or Shalinskoye (neuter) may refer to:

== Places ==
- Shalinsky District, several districts in Russia
- Shalinsky Urban Okrug, a municipal formation which a part of Shalinsky District in Sverdlovsk Oblast, Russia is incorporated as
- Shalinskoye Urban Settlement, a municipal formation which Shali Town Administration in Shalinsky District of the Chechen Republic, Russia is incorporated as
- Shalinskoye (rural locality), a rural locality (a selo) in Mansky District of Krasnoyarsk Krai, Russia

== People ==
- Sander Shalinsky, a manager of RyanDan, a Canadian musical duo

== See also ==
- Shali (disambiguation)
- Mortimer Griffin and Shalinsky, a 1985 Academy Award-winning short film
