= Shalinsky District =

Location of the Chechen Republic in Russia

Location of Sverdlovsk Oblast in Russia

Shalinsky District is the name of several administrative and municipal districts in Russia:

- Shalinsky District, Chechen Republic, an administrative and municipal district of the Chechen Republic
- Shalinsky District, Sverdlovsk Oblast, an administrative district of Sverdlovsk Oblast

== See also ==
- Shalinsky (disambiguation)
