= Sioux City (film) =

- Directed by: Lou Diamond Phillips
- Written by: L. Virginia Browne
- Produced by: Brian Rix
- Starring: Lou Diamond Phillips; Salli Richardson; Bill Allen; Tantoo Cardinal; Gary Farmer; John Dye Ralph Waite
- Cinematography: James W. Wrenn
- Edited by: Mark Fitzgerald
- Music by: Christopher Lindsay
- Production companies: Cabin Fever Films; Facets Films
- Distributed by: IRS Media
- Release date: 1994
- Running time: 102 minutes
- Country: United States
- Language: English

Sioux City is a 1994 American mystery drama film directed by and starring Lou Diamond Phillips, with Gary Farmer, Tantoo Cardinal. It was Phillips' directorial debut.

It was filmed in Santa Clarita, California.

== Plot overview ==
Dr. Jesse Rainfeather Goldman (Lou Diamond Phillips) is a young doctor of Lakota Sioux heritage and was adopted by a wealthy Jewish couple as a child in Beverly Hills, California. He knows almost nothing of Native American traditions due to his upbringing. While doing an internship, he receives an amulet from the Lakota reservation in South Sioux City, Nebraska from his biological mother. Jesse, intrigued, travels to Sioux City, his birthplace, to learn why she sent it. On arriving, his mother's body is uncovered in the smoldering remains of her home. Jesse then begins looking into her mysterious death. While doing so, he gets to know people from the Lakota tribe and learn about the tribe's customs.

== Plot summary ==
Dr. Jesse Rainfeather Goldman (Lou Diamond Phillips) is an emergency room doctor living with his adoptive Jewish parents Douglas (Adam Roarke) and Leah Goldman (Melinda Dillon) in Beverly Hills, California. Going maverick with another physician's patient by removing her from all prescribed medications, he is put on forced leave instead of a suspension, effective after his shift is over.

His adoptive parents host a lavish party for his birthday. When a strange amulet of feathers and bones arrives in a box, Leah tells Jesse it's a birthday gift from his biological mother Dawn Rainfeather (Tantoo Cardinal). A note in the box says that Dawn wants to see Jesse for the first time in years. He begins to experience vivid flashbacks to his early violent childhood. Jesse follows the postmark to the Brown Rock reservation in South Sioux City, Nebraska, where he discovers that Dawn was killed in a recent fire.

At the South Sioux City police station, he presents the ruse of being a trustee handling Dawns estate. Deputy Larkin is overtly hostile towards Jesse and stonewalls him when Jesse asks him questions about his mother's death, insisting that Dawn died in a house fire and dismisses Dawn as being drunk and probably setting the fire. Upon spying into her open file, Jesse's medical training enables him to spot bullet holes in Dawn's body when he sees morgue photos of Dawn's corpse. Larkin catches Jesse, but not before Jesse steals one of the autopsy photos. Senior Deputy, Drew McDermott, hears the commotion and comes out to investigate. Jesse tells him that he wants to report Dawn's death as a homicide. Drew stands behind Larkin, but promises to look into the allegations.

He goes into a local Native American post where he meets the owner, Jolene. She takes him to a valley to scatter Dawns ashes and tells him what she knew about Dawn.

A day or two later, Jesse, before he walks into his motel room, sees that the door is ajar. Upon walking inside, he discovers that his room has been ransacked, and the autopsy photo that he had in his possession is gone.

He immediately recognizes that one of Drew's deputies was responsible for the break in. Livid, he goes to the station to confront Drew, who in turn shows him the missing autopsy photo. It quickly escalates into Jesse accusing Drew of covering up the truth about Dawn's murder. Fuming, Drew seizes Jesse by his hair and warning him to stand down. Jesse warns Drew that he'd destroy his career if he didn't take his hands off of him. When asked why Jesse was concerned over the death of “some dead Indian” Jesse reveals to Drew that Dawn was his mother.

Out on the town, Jesse encounters the kind of overt racism that he never experienced in privileged Beverly Hills. Denied a table at an upscale restaurant, The Final Edition, Allison, a young reporter, secures both of them a table by pretending to be his date. She quickly becomes smitten with Jesse.

What Jesse doesn't realize is that Deputy and Larkin have been stalking him. Larkin, who had been trying for some time to get Allison interested in him, becomes livid when he sees Allison leave with Jesse.

They return to Allison's apartment, where Allison informs Jesse that Dawn was rumored to be an alcoholic prostitute. She attempts to become intimate with Jesse. For reasons he can't articulate just yet, Jesse declines Allison's affections. Before he leaves, he reveals to Allison that Dawn was his mother

Snooping for clues, Jesse goes into a Native American bar and meets the local medicine man—his grandfather Clifford Rainfeather (Apesanahkwat)—who upon hearing Jesse's inquiring about his mother's death immediately realizes that Jesse is his grandson. He proceeds to inform Jesse that everything that he'd been told about his mother's death had been a lie.

Jesse leaves the bar to return to his motel room. Larkin and Dawes, hot on his trail, shoots out his tires, disabling the car, and forcing him to attempt to flee on foot. They viciously beat him and saturate him with whiskey. They then dump him into a ravine and leave him for dead.

One of the workers at Clifford's bar, Russell, discovers Jesse and has him taken, with Clifford's help, to an isolated cave, knowing that Jesses attackers would come back to finish the job if they knew he'd survived the brutal attack. Which is why they refused to take him to a white hospital. Delirious from fever and the beating, he continues to have more flashbacks from his early childhood. Clifford, Russell, and Jolene set his broken arm, and stabilize his condition.

Once he recovers sufficiently after his fever breaks and he can move around, Jolene takes him to her house. Jesse reveals his bitterness over his mother giving him up and an angry Jolene defends her, stating that he had no idea what it was like to be a Native American woman. However, the two quickly fall in love.

Meanwhile, Allison, whose been looking for him, discovers his disappearance and letters from Jesses parents, who are also concerned. Discovering that he is at Jolene's, who is openly hostile towards Allison, Allison shows her the letters to try to persuade her to let her see Jesse. Jesse comes outside and Allison recoils in horror when she sees the severity of his injuries. Clearly having been told by Jesse who his attackers were and that he believed that Drew ordered the attack, Allison goes to the deputy's office. Here it is revealed that Drew is her father and she confronts him about the beating. He becomes angry, believing that Jesse seduced her and interrogates her as to whether or not she slept with Jesse. She angrily refuses to answer him.

Meanwhile Larkin and Dawes discover that Jesse survived the attack and quickly panic, knowing that Jesse can identify them.

Jesse is now more determined than ever to learn what really happened to his mother. He decides to engage in an old Native American rite of passage called “standing out.” Through visions and objects belonging to his mother, he would learn the truth. Clifford was concerned over the isolated location that wasn't Native American land anymore.

We see a discussion between Drew and Larkin, revealing that in fact that Drew was responsible for ordering the beating that almost cost Jesse his life. Angry at Larkins sloppiness over covering his own tracks, this time Drew insisted on being present to finish Jesse off. They already know that Jesse is standing out and that he'd be alone and isolated. Allison, who didn't believe her father, had been following them. She follows them to the police station and waits till they leave. She goes into her father's office where, looking through her father's desk, she finds a secret compartment containing an amulet and a photo of Jesses mother. Devastated it dawns on her that. Not only did her father had many years ago an intimate relationship with Dawn, Drew was Jesses biological father and Jesse was her half brother. She returns to Jolene realizing that her father intended with Larkin to murder Jesse. She shows Jolene the amulet and photo.

During standing out, Jesse also learns that Drew is his biological father. He also learns that Larkin killed his mother on Drews orders. His mother loved his father absolutely and that was why she gave up Jesse for adoption. He now understood that Allison was his half sister and that he'd instinctively known.

Larkin arrives and is pushed off of a cliff by Russell.

Drew shows up to kill Jesse. Jesse confronts him with the truth, enraged of Drew's dismissal of the Native American ceremony of marriage to Dawn. How she gave him up because shed loved Drew utterly. Drew stated that Jesse was alive because of her choice that he'd never acknowledge an illegitimate Native American child as his son. Drew attacks Jesse revealing his utter disgust and hatred for him. He's about to shoot Jesse when Allison shows up with Jolene firing a warning shot. Devastated and heartbroken over her father's betrayal and how his own son meant nothing to him, her grief causes her to unravel. Drew manages to distract her and tries to shoot Jesse again. Russell shoots Drew seriously injuring him.

A couple of days later, a guilt ridden Jesse tries to make amends with Allison. He wants to be part of her life as her brother. However she is too traumatized to be able to accept his offer, saying maybe someday. As he leaves she stops him to give him the amulet that belonged to his mother.

Russell had discovered Jesses car and had it repaired. Jesse knowing that his home was with his adoptive parents wants Jolene to come with him. She doesn't want him to leave but doesn't want to leave her home either. However months later, Jesse now working in a clinic that he founded to provide healthcare for Native Americans in Los Angeles, she shows up and they begin to resume their relationship.

== Production ==
Lou Diamond Phillips cowrote and performed two songs for the movie's soundtrack, Cry of the Wounded Eagle with Charlie Daniels and Find Your Way Home with Chris Lindsey.
