= Task (TV series) =

2025 American crime drama television series

- Promotional poster
- Genre: Crime drama
- Created by: Brad Ingelsby
- Starring: Mark Ruffalo; Tom Pelphrey; Emilia Jones; Fabien Frankel; Thuso Mbedu; Raúl Castillo; Alison Oliver; Owen Teague; Silvia Dionicio; Martha Plimpton; Jamie McShane; Sam Keeley; Phoebe Fox
- Music by: Dan Deacon
- Country of origin: United States
- Original language: English
- No. of seasons: 1
- No. of episodes: 7

Production
- Executive producers: Brad Inglesby; Mark Roybal; Jeremiah Zagar; Salli Richardson Whitfield; Mark Ruffalo; Ron Schmidt; David Crockett; Paul Lee
- Producers: Gabrielle Mahon; Holly Rymon
- Production location: Pennsylvania
- Cinematography: Alex Disenhof; Elie Smolkin
- Editors: Amy E. Duddelston; Keiko Deguchi
- Running time: 58–65 minutes
- Production companies: Low Dweller Productions; Public Record; wiip; HBO Entertainment

Original release
- Network: HBO
- Release: September 7, 2025 – present

Related
- Mare of Easttown

Task is an American crime drama television series created and written by Brad Ingelsby for HBO. The series is set in the working-class suburbs of Philadelphia, Pennsylvania, where an FBI agent heads a Task Force to put an end to a string of violent robberies of drug houses. The first season premiered on September 7, 2025; it consisted of seven episodes. The first season cast includes Mark Ruffalo, Tom Pelphrey, Emilia Jones, Thuso Mbedu, Raúl Castillo, Jamie McShane, Sam Keeley, Fabien Frankel, Alison Oliver, Silvia Dionicio, and Martha Plimpton.

Task received positive reviews from critics. The series received six Primetime Emmy Award nominations, including acting nominations for Ruffalo and Pelphrey. Pelphrey won the Primetime Emmy Award for Outstanding Supporting Actor in a Drama Series.

Originally billed as a limited series, its strong reception led to Task being renewed in November 2025 for a second season. Ruffalo, Plimpton and Dionicio return for the second season. A number of new cast members were added to the show for season two, including Mahershala Ali.

== Premise ==
Philadelphia-based FBI agent Tom Brandis is put in charge of a task force investigating a string of violent robberies against stash houses run by outlaw motorcycle gangs.

== Cast ==
=== Main ===
- Mark Ruffalo as Tom Brandis, an FBI agent and former Catholic priest ordered to head up a task force investigating a series of armed robberies, returning to field duty after taking time off due to a family tragedy
- Tom Pelphrey as Robbie Prendergrast, a garbage collector for J&W Sanitation who robs "trap houses" operated by drug gangs in the Philadelphia area
- Emilia Jones as Maeve Prendergrast, Robbie's 21-year-old niece who has been saddled with the raising of Robbie's young children since the departure of his wife almost a year earlier
- Fabien Frankel as Anthony Grasso, a Delaware County detective who joins the task force Tom sets up to investigate the robberies
- Thuso Mbedu as Aleah Clinton, a no-nonsense Chester detective sergeant who joins Tom's task force
- Raúl Castillo as Cliff Broward, Robbie's friend and co-worker who joins in the trap house robberies
- Alison Oliver as Lizzie Stover, an inexperienced PSP trooper on Tom's task force
- Owen Teague as Kenny "Peaches" Pollard, Robbie and Cliff's accomplice in the trap house robberies
- Silvia Dionicio as Emily Brandis, Tom's adopted daughter and biological sister of Ethan, Tom's adopted son
- Martha Plimpton as Kathleen McGinty, FBI Supervisory Senior Resident in Charge and Tom's superior officer
- Jamie McShane as Perry Dorazo, one of the national leaders of the Dark Hearts motorcycle gang whose trap houses are the target of most of the robberies
- Sam Keeley as Jayson Wilkes, Perry's protegé and a volatile member of the Dark Hearts who heads their operations in Delaware County.
- Phoebe Fox as Sara, Tom's biological daughter and adoptive sister to Emily and Ethan

=== Recurring ===
- Ben Doherty as Sam, Derek's young son
- Oliver Eisenson as Wyatt Prendergrast, Robbie's son
- Kennedy Moyer as Harper Prendergrast, Robbie's daughter
- Stephanie Kurtzuba as Donna
- Margarita Levieva as Eryn, Jayson's romantic partner who was previously involved with Robbie's brother Billy
- Colin Bates as Shane McReynolds, a mechanic and member of the Dark Hearts
- Dominic Colón as Derek 'Breaker'
- Robert Berlin as Julius, a Dark Hearts lieutenant

=== Guest ===
- Isaach de Bankolé as Daniel Georges, a Catholic priest and Tom's longtime friend
- Michael Maize as Deric Nance, a Dark Hearts member who runs one of the gang's trap houses in Delaware County
- Raphael Sbarge as Michael Dorsey, chief of detectives of the Delaware County Criminal Investigation Division and Anthony Grasso's boss
- Mickey Sumner as Shelley Driscoll, the partner of Robbie and Cliff's friend Ray Lyman
- Brian Goodman as Vincent Hawkes, one of the 12 national leaders of the Dark Hearts who make up the gang's "Mother Club"
- Elvis Nolasco as Freddy Frias, a Dominican drug kingpin in Philadelphia who does business with the Dark Hearts
- Coral Peña as Meg Coyle, a counselor at Emily's school
- Mireille Enos as Susan Brandis, Tom's wife who was killed by their adopted son Ethan
- Jack Kesy as Billy Prendergast, Robbie's deceased brother and Maeve's father, a member of the Dark Hearts who was murdered by Jayson after his affair with Eryn was discovered
- Lilli Kay as Frankie Grasso, Anthony Grasso's sister
- Andrew Russel as Ethan, Tom's adopted son and Emily's biological brother, who is currently incarcerated for the killing of Susan, Tom's wife.

== Episodes ==
No.	Title	Directed by	Written by	Original release date	U.S. viewers (millions)
1	"Crossings"	Jeremiah Zagar	Brad Ingelsby	September 7, 2025	0.214
In Delaware County, Pennsylvania, Tom Brandis, a former Catholic priest turned FBI agent, is working as a recruiter for the Bureau, having taken time off from field work after a recent family tragedy. His superior, Kathleen McGinty, insists he return to head a task force investigating a series of robberies of "trap houses" run by the Dark Hearts, a dangerous and well-organized motorcycle gang. The task force includes State Trooper Lizzie Stover, Chester city detective Aleah Clinton, and Delaware County detective Anthony Grasso. Meanwhile, Robbie Prendergrast resides in his deceased brother's house with his two young children and his brother's daughter Maeve; he has a strained relationship with Maeve, who has been saddled with looking after his young children since his wife walked out on them almost a year earlier. Robbie and his friend Cliff Broward use their jobs as waste collectors to plan robberies of the trap houses, determining when the cash from drug sales is likely to be on hand. Their robberies are facilitated by someone who seems to have inside information about the Dark Hearts' operation. Robbie, Cliff, and their friend Peaches attempt to rob a trap house belonging to Dark Hearts member Derek where they have been told a large amount of cash is being kept. The heist goes horribly wrong when another gang member unexpectedly arrives at the house. A shootout ensues, leading to the deaths of all three bikers present as well as Peaches. When Derek's young son, Sam, appears, Robbie, wishing to shield him from witnessing his parents' deaths and to protect himself and Cliff from arrest, takes Sam to his own home.
2	"Family Statements"	Jeremiah Zagar	Brad Ingelsby	September 14, 2025	0.217
Jayson, the president of the Dark Hearts Delaware County chapter, learns about the fatal home invasion and kidnapping. His mentor Perry Dorazo, one of the gang's national leaders, arrives to warn him that the other leaders want the child found and the robbers held accountable. Robbie and Cliff learn that the duffel bag they took from Derek's house is filled with pure fentanyl rather than the cash they expected. Robbie must now figure out what to do with both the drugs and Sam. Maeve learns the truth about Sam's identity when he mentions the name of his father, Derek, a name she recognizes. Fearing the Dark Hearts and knowing that the police are searching for Sam, she leaves him at a store near the arcade where she works and makes an anonymous call to the FBI tip line. Instead of being picked up by the police, however, Sam sneaks back to her car. When Tom arrives in response to her call, Maeve deliberately misleads him and goes home with Sam. She angrily confronts Robbie about the situation.
3	"Nobody's Stronger Than Forgiveness"	Salli Richardson Whitfield	Brad Ingelsby	September 21, 2025	0.259
Confronted by Maeve, Robbie confesses to stealing from the Dark Hearts as an act of revenge for the murder of his brother Billy at the hands of Jayson. Jayson and Perry approach Freddie Frias, a drug kingpin in Philadelphia who has previously collaborated with the Dark Hearts, to seek his assistance in retrieving the stolen fentanyl, but Freddie insists on a significant discount on the price in return. Meanwhile, Tom and his team discover that one of the guns used in the fatal trap house heist was also used by the Dark Hearts themselves in a shooting incident years before, suggesting that the weapon belongs to a Dark Hearts member who is working with Robbie and Cliff. It is revealed that Eryn, Jayson's girlfriend (and former lover of Billy), is Robbie's secret source within the Dark Hearts. Cliff and Robbie meet with Ray, Cliff's former prison cellmate, who appears eager to help them move the fentanyl. The task force receive a tip that Cliff is one of the trap house robbers. That night, the task force enter Cliff's home in the hope of rescuing Sam but find Ray and his wife Shelley in the process of burgling the place. A fight ensues in which Tom receives a concussion, Lizzie freezes just when her help is needed, Shelley escapes, and Ray is finally subdued by Grasso. Ray's parole is revoked and he is sent back to prison. Tom uses Ray's phone to text Cliff to arrange a meeting for the sale of the fentanyl, planning to arrest him when he shows up. As Robbie drives Cliff home that night, they find the house surrounded by police. Realizing that Cliff has been identified as one of the robbers, they go back to Robbie's. The next morning, Agent Easley informs Tom that shortly after the raid on Cliff's home a vehicle belonging to a Dark Hearts Lieutenant was seen in Cliff's neighborhood. Tom realizes that someone on his team has leaked information to the Dark Hearts.
4	"All Roads"	Salli Richardson Whitfield	Teleplay by : Brad Ingelsby; Story by : Brad Ingelsby & Dave Obzud	September 28, 2025	0.260
Tom and his team work with Chief Dorsey and the men of the Delaware County force to plan the arrest of Cliff when he shows up at the meeting Tom set up using Ray's phone. Perry is told by Vincent, one of the other national leaders of the biker gang, that the leaders have decided to get rid of Jayson for failing to deal with the trap house robberies. Perry questions Shane, a Delaware County Dark Hearts member. He learns that Jayson killed Billy Prendergrast because he was having an affair with Eryn, then falsely told Perry that Billy had stolen from the club. Perry angrily confronts Jayson and later Eryn about what really happened with Billy. Eryn admits the affair but denies betraying the club. At FBI headquarters, Tom tells Kathleen he suspects there is a leak in his team. When he leaves, Kath makes a call on her personal phone and tells someone, "We may have a problem." Robbie visits a friend of Billy's who may help get him and Cliff to Canada once the fentanyl is sold. When Sam wanders off and attracts the attention of a pedestrian, Robbie knocks the man down and flees the scene with the boy. Maeve refuses to join Robbie's Canada plan, insisting that she will take Sam to the police the next day if Robbie does not. Tom's sting operation fails when a couple looking for their dog shows up at the meeting site rather than Cliff. Unknown to Tom, Cliff has been redirected by Jayson, now in possession of Ray's phone, to a different location. Cliff is ambushed by the Dark Hearts and is killed after they find part of the missing fentanyl and a gun in his car. Perry discovers a photo link between Billy and the gun from the trap house shootout. Emily drinks too much at a party, then argues with Tom bitterly about her and Ethan. The next morning, Tom receives a lead: a photo from the pedestrian Robbie assaulted showing Sam with Robbie, though Robbie's face is obscured.
5	"Vagrants"	Jeremiah Zagar	Teleplay by : Brad Ingelsby; Story by : Brad Ingelsby & Dave Obzud	October 5, 2025	0.307
The morning after Cliff's death, Robbie attempts to confront Ray about the meeting at which Cliff was ambushed but learns from Shelley, Ray's partner, that Ray was arrested two days ago and could not have set up the meeting. Shelley offers Robbie help in selling the fentanyl. Perry and Jayson dispose of Cliff's remains, and Perry secretly plants a tracking device on Eryn's car. Perry later visits Maeve under the pretext of borrowing her late father's club jacket for a memorial, unaware that Sam is hiding nearby. Robbie meets Eryn and realizes that Cliff has been killed. He takes the fentanyl to Freddie, who expresses interest but secretly tips off Jayson. The FBI sketch artist produces a drawing of Robbie after talking to the pedestrian Robbie attacked. Grasso is revealed as the leak in the task force when he meets with Jayson to recover the phone that was used to trap Cliff. Emily and Sarah reconcile, with Sarah revealing that she is separated from her husband. Perry tracks Eryn to her meeting with Robbie, and after confronting her, kills her when she tries to escape. Tom visits the Prendergrast house to question Maeve after finding out her connection to Billy, but instead finds Robbie preparing to leave for the meeting in Bushkill with Freddie. Growing suspicious, Robbie forces Tom to leave with him before Grasso, who is on the way there, can arrive. Tom, believing Robbie means to kill him, asks for the opportunity to speak with his children first, but Robbie releases Tom in the woods, imploring him to protect Maeve. Maeve takes Sam to the police, but her interview with Kath is cut short when Kath learns of Tom's disappearance. Tom walks to a nearby park, contacts his family, and is then picked up by the task force. As the task force and the Dark Hearts converge in Bushkill, Robbie arrives, only to be confronted by Tom. As Tom points a gun at him, he refuses Tom's demand to surrender.
6	"Out beyond ideas of wrongdoing and rightdoing, there is a river."	Salli Richardson Whitfield	Teleplay by : Brad Ingelsby; Story by : Brad Ingelsby & Dave Obzud	October 12, 2025	0.401
A shootout occurs between Robbie, the FBI, and the Dark Hearts. Kathleen is shot in the chest but survives. Robbie throws the stolen fentanyl in the river and engages in a fistfight with Jayson, who stabs him before fleeing when Tom intervenes. Lizzie is killed when she is struck by Perry and Jayson's truck as they escape. On the way to the hospital, Robbie succumbs to his injury in Tom's arms. As Sam is back in custody, the task force is disbanded, and the case is passed on to other FBI officers, though the leak is still being investigated. Grasso's superior threatens him to keep quiet about the leak. Tom informs Maeve about Robbie's death and presses her for details about Robbie's plan for the drug meetup on the night Cliff was killed. Tom visits Sam at a government childcare facility and decides to foster him. Maeve is released from FBI custody and reunites with Robbie's kids. Kath informs Tom that Grasso is the leak, and reassures him that Perry and Jayson will be found soon. Jayson is concerned about Eryn's disappearance and continues to make calls to other gang members despite Perry's warnings. Tom goes to Grasso's house and confronts him about his role in the drug meetup, but Grasso denies it. Tom enlists Aleah to help prove Grasso's wrongdoing. Perry and Jayson find Robbie's bag of drugs washed up in the river, but it is filled with magazines; Shell helped Robbie sell the drugs, and she drops off a bag of money to Maeve.
7	"A Still Small Voice"	Jeremiah Zagar	Brad Ingelsby	October 19, 2025	0.442
To protect their interests, the Dark Hearts cut ties with their police contacts and pressure Perry to kill Jayson. Perry prepares to kill Jayson with a fishing knife, but balks. Grasso visits his sister and confesses that his choice to be a dirty cop got Lizzie killed, and how he plans to turn himself in. Authorities find Eryn's body in the quarry with Perry's necklace clutched in her hand. Perry deduces that the money from the drug sale must be with Maeve, who has hidden the money away. Donna overhears their conversation on the phone and sends the leader of the Dark Hearts after them to protect Maeve. Jayson learns of Perry's role in Eryn's drowning death, kills Perry, and runs off. Emily and Sarah bond with Sam. Aleah, Tom, and Kath make progress on unveiling Grasso's betrayal. Grasso's superior Michael, working with the leader of the Dark Hearts, goes to Grasso's house with a plan to kill him in an "accident". Grasso pulls a gun on him, and superior reveals their plan to get the money from Maeve before he is shot in the head by Vincent, the leader of the Dark Hearts, who is then shot by Grasso. Grasso, who is bleeding out from a bullet wound, drives to Maeve's house to warn her, with Aleah and Tom in pursuit. Maeve attempts to flee, but is confronted by Jayson, who tries to take her and the money before being shot and killed by Grasso. Tom comforts Maeve and pretends not to see the bag of money, and Grasso recovers in the hospital. Tom, Emily, and Sarah attend Ethan's sentencing, and Tom gives a moving family impact statement, forgiving Ethan and inviting him to come home once he is released. Sam is adopted by a new family, Maeve sells the house and she, Wyatt and Harper move away from Delco, and Tom looks hopeful for a new life.

== Production ==
=== Development ===
In June 2023, it was announced HBO had greenlit the series, with Brad Ingelsby serving as creator and writer, and Jeremiah Zagar set to direct multiple episodes. In December 2023, it was announced Salli Richardson-Whitfield would also direct multiple episodes and serve as an executive producer. In November 2024, the series's title, Task, was announced. Originally billed as a miniseries, on November 20, 2025, HBO renewed the series for a second season. On June 22, 2026, HBO announced Georgi Banks-Davies, Clare Kilner, and Kitty Green would serve as directors for the second season, joining returning director Richardson-Whitfield.

=== Casting ===
==== Season 1 ====
After initial choice Michael Keaton had to withdraw due to scheduling conflicts, Mark Ruffalo was announced in June 2023 to star in the series. In December 2023, Tom Pelphrey, Emilia Jones, Thuso Mbedu, Raúl Castillo, Jamie McShane, Sam Keeley, Fabien Frankel and Alison Oliver joined the cast of the series. In March 2024, Owen Teague, Dominic Colón, Margarita Levieva, Raphael Sbarge, Mickey Sumner, Elvis Nolasco, Brian Goodman, Colin Bates, Isaach de Bankolé, Phoebe Fox, Silvia Dionicio and Coral Peña joined the cast in recurring roles. In November 2024, Martha Plimpton and Mireille Enos were announced as part of the cast.

==== Season 2 ====
In March 2026, Mahershala Ali was cast as part of the starring cast for the second season. In May 2026, Harry Melling, Adam Nagaitis and Aminah Nieves joined the cast of the second season. In June 2026, Édgar Ramírez was cast for the second season. In July 2026, Julianne Nicholson was announced to be reprising her role from Ingelsby's other series, Mare of Easttown (2021), revealing that these series are set in the same universe. Also in July, it was confirmed Plimpton and Dionicio would return for the second season, reprising their roles. In August 2026, Tim Blake Nelson, Jharrel Jerome, Brían F. O'Byrne, Kevin Dunn, Bethlehem Million, Stephanie Sigman, Alaíde, Rocío Guzmán, and Regina Nava joined the second season, while Andrew Russel was announced to reprise his role as Ethan Brandis. In September 2026, Rose Rollins was cast as a series regular, while Carol Santiago was cast in a recurring capacity.

=== Filming ===
Principal photography of season one of began in Delaware County, Pennsylvania and Philadelphia in March 2024. Filming of season two of began in July 2026, with filming occurring in Manayunk, Philadelphia and parts of Delaware and Chester Counties.

== Release ==
Task premiered on HBO on September 7, 2025. Episodes were released weekly; there were a total of seven episodes in season one.

== Reception ==
=== Critical response ===
The review aggregator website Rotten Tomatoes reported a 96% approval rating, with an average rating of 7.95/10, based on 83 critic reviews. The website's critics consensus reads: "Mark Ruffalo and Tom Pelphrey are superb in Task, a culturally-specific crime story that's unrelentingly bleak but equally riveting." Metacritic, which uses a weighted average, gave a score of 77 out of 100, based on 34 critics, indicating "generally favorable" reviews.

=== Awards and nominations ===
Year	Award	Category	Recipient(s)	Result	Ref.
2025	American Film Institute Awards	Top 10 Television Programs	Task	Won (Note: This award does not have a single winner, but recognizes multiple programs.)	
2026	American Society of Cinematographers	Episode of a One-Hour Regular Series	Alex Disenhof (for "Crossings")	Won (Note: Tied with Christophe Nuyens for Andor (Episode: "I Have Friends Everywhere"))	
2025	Astra Creative Arts Awards	Best Hairstyling	Task	Nominated	
2025	Astra Creative Arts Awards	Best Score	Task	Nominated	
2026	Astra TV Awards	Best Actor in a Drama Series	Mark Ruffalo	Nominated	
2026	Astra TV Awards	Best Supporting Actor in a Drama Series	Tom Pelphrey	Nominated	
2026	Astra TV Awards	Best Supporting Actress in a Drama Series	Emilia Jones	Nominated	
2026	Astra TV Awards	Best Writing in a Drama Series	Brad Ingelsby (for "A Still Small Voice")	Nominated	
2026	British Academy Television Awards	Best Supporting Actress	Emilia Jones	Nominated	
2026	British Society of Cinematographers	Best Cinematography in a Television Drama (International/Streaming)	Alex Disenhof (for "Crossings")	Nominated	
2026	Critics' Choice Awards	Best Drama Series	Task	Nominated	
2026	Critics' Choice Awards	Best Actor in a Drama Series	Mark Ruffalo	Nominated	
2026	Critics' Choice Awards	Best Supporting Actor in a Drama Series	Tom Pelphrey	Nominated	
2026	Critics' Choice Super Awards	Best Action Series, Limited Series, or Made-for-TV Movie	Task	Won	
2026	Critics' Choice Super Awards	Best Actor in an Action Series, Limited Series, or Made-for-TV Movie	Mark Ruffalo	Nominated	
2026	Dorian TV Awards	Best TV Performance – Drama	Mark Ruffalo	Nominated	
2026	Golden Globe Awards	Best Performance by a Male Actor in a Television Series – Drama	Mark Ruffalo	Nominated	
2026	Golden Reel Awards	Outstanding Achievement in Sound Editing – Broadcast Long Form Dialogue / ADR	Lidia Tamplenizza, Michael McMenomy, and Mar Heredia (for "Vagrants")	Nominated	
2026	Golden Trailer Awards	Best Thriller TrailerByte for a TV/Streaming Series	"Carousel" (HBO Max / HBO Marketing AV)	Nominated	
2026	Gotham TV Awards	Breakthrough Drama Series	Brad Ingelsby, David Crockett, Paul Lee, Mark Roybal, Mark Ruffalo, Ron Schmidt, Salli Richardson-Whitfield, and Jeremiah Zagar	Nominated	
2026	Gotham TV Awards	Outstanding Supporting Performance in a Drama Series	Tom Pelphrey	Nominated	
2026	Guild of Music Supervisors Awards	Best Music Supervision in a Trailer (Series)	Anny Colvin (for "Season 1 – Official Trailer")	Nominated	
2026	Irish Film & Television Awards	Best Supporting Actress – Drama	Alison Oliver	Won	
2026	MacGuffin Awards	Television Miniseries	Susannah McCarthy	Nominated	
2026	Primetime Emmy Awards	Outstanding Lead Actor in a Drama Series	Mark Ruffalo	Nominated	
2026	Primetime Emmy Awards	Outstanding Supporting Actor in a Drama Series	Tom Pelphrey	Won	
2026	Primetime Emmy Awards	Outstanding Directing for a Drama Series	Salli Richardson-Whitfield (for "Out beyond ideas of wrongdoing and rightdoing, there is a river.")	Nominated	
2026	Primetime Emmy Awards	Outstanding Writing for a Drama Series	Brad Ingelsby (for "A Still Small Voice")	Nominated	
2026	Primetime Creative Arts Emmy Awards	Outstanding Cinematography for a Series (One Hour)	Alex Disenhof (for "Crossings")	Nominated	
2026	Primetime Creative Arts Emmy Awards	Outstanding Picture Editing for a Drama Series	Keiko Deguchi and Amy E. Duddleston (for "A Still Small Voice")	Nominated	
2026	Satellite Awards	Best Actor in a Series – Drama or Genre	Mark Ruffalo	Nominated	
2025	Screen Awards	Best TV Series	Task	Nominated	
2025	Screen Awards	Best New TV Series Debut	Task	Nominated	
2026	TCA Awards	Outstanding Achievement in Drama	Task	Nominated	
2026	Writers Guild of America Awards	New Series	Brad Ingelsby and David Obzud	Nominated	
2026	Writers Guild of America Awards	Episodic Drama	Brad Ingelsby (for "A Still Small Voice")	Nominated	
