= Run All Night (film) =

- Theatrical release poster
- Directed by: Jaume Collet-Serra
- Written by: Brad Ingelsby
- Produced by: Roy Lee; Michael Tadross; Brooklyn Weaver
- Starring: Liam Neeson; Joel Kinnaman; Vincent D'Onofrio; Nick Nolte; Bruce McGill; Genesis Rodriguez; Common; Ed Harris
- Cinematography: Martin Ruhe
- Edited by: Dirk Westervelt
- Music by: Junkie XL
- Production companies: RatPac-Dune Entertainment; Energy Entertainment; Vertigo Entertainment
- Distributed by: Warner Bros. Pictures
- Release dates: March 9, 2015 (New York City); March 13, 2015 (United States)
- Running time: 114 minutes
- Country: United States
- Language: English
- Budget: $50–61.6 million
- Box office: $71.6 million

Run All Night is a 2015 American action thriller film directed by Jaume Collet-Serra and written by Brad Ingelsby. The film stars Liam Neeson, Joel Kinnaman, Common, and Ed Harris and follows an ex-Irish Mob hitman who goes on the run with his estranged adult son after he is forced to kill the son of a mobster boss. It also marks the third collaboration between Liam Neeson and Jaume Collet-Serra after Unknown and Non-Stop.

It was released in the United States on March 13, 2015, received mixed reviews from critics and grossed $71.6 million worldwide.

== Plot ==
Haunted by his past, ex-Irish Mob hitman Jimmy "The Gravedigger" Conlon has become an angry drunk. His son Michael 'Mike' Conlon, a chauffeur and retired professional boxer who mentors at-risk kids at the local gym, is disgusted by his father's actions and refuses to call him "Dad" or involve him in the lives of his daughters.

Jimmy's old boss and closest friend, Shawn Maguire, rejects an offer to allow the sale of Albanian heroin in his territory. The Albanians demand that Danny, Shawn's son, who took a large fee to arrange the deal, return their money now. Mike drives the two Albanian creditors to Danny's house. But Danny and his friend double cross and shoot the Albanians, one of whom is shot dead by Danny outside. This is witnessed by Mike and his mentee boxer, Legs, who captures the shooting on his phone. Danny spots Mike and attempts to kill him but he escapes. Danny does not notice Legs.

Jimmy requests Mike, at Shawn's behest, to not expose Danny and leaves to negotiate with Shawn. As he is leaving, Jimmy spots Danny's car and goes inside to find him about to shoot Mike. Jimmy shoots Danny then calls Shawn to inform him of his son's death. Shawn sends two corrupt NYPD officers to pick up Mike and kill him, but Jimmy rescues him and shoots one of the corrupt cops before taking Mike to his family. Before they can get on the subway, Jimmy and Frank fight in a washroom until Jimmy strangles Frank with a towel.

Jimmy meets Shawn and tells him that it was Danny who was about to kill Mike, and that he might have to speak to the NYPD about his criminal past. Shawn says that the cops care nothing for Jimmy's information, and tells Jimmy he will kill Mike and his family in revenge, then let Jimmy die.

Jimmy sends Mike's family to a remote cabin and takes Mike with him to retrieve proof of his innocence, but Andrew Price, an assassin contracted by Shawn, intercepts them first. Jimmy is able to subdue him, but is wounded in the fight. Jimmy later contacts Detective Harding, a cop who has not been able to prove Jimmy's role in a long list of homicides. Harding says that witnesses claim Mike was the shooter and not Danny. Jimmy makes a deal with Harding, he will prove Mike is innocent and then turn himself in with a list of all the people he murdered in his mob career.

The two hide at the house of Jimmy's brother Eddie. An incensed Eddie reveals that Jimmy is loyal only to Shawn — he once killed his own cousin to prevent him testifying against Shawn and will do the same to Mike. Disgusted and unwilling to trust his father, Mike returns to his family. Seeking to end the blood feud, Jimmy attacks Shawn's hideout and kills him and his gang. At the same time, Legs visits Harding with the video of the murder of the second Albanian and Harding has the ballistics on Danny's gun checked to confirm the video.

Mike arrives at the cabin and alerts the police to his location. Jimmy soon arrives, and Mike finally introduces him to his grandchildren. Price arrives and attacks the cabin, shooting Jimmy and then hunting down Mike and his family. Mike is cornered by Price, but Jimmy kills him. The police arrive and confirm Legs' evidence has cleared Mike just as Jimmy dies, holding the list of his past victims for Harding as promised.

In the epilogue, Mike is back working as a boxing trainer and chauffeur and living happily with his wife and daughters. He looks wistfully at a photo of himself and Jimmy from long ago before heading to work.

== Cast ==
- Liam Neeson as Jimmy 'The Gravedigger' Conlon
- Joel Kinnaman as Mike Conlon
- Ed Harris as Shawn Maguire
- Common as Andrew Price
- Vincent D'Onofrio as Detective John Harding
- James Martinez as Detective Oscar Torres
- Boyd Holbrook as Danny Maguire
- Patricia Kalember as Rose Maguire
- Bruce McGill as Pat Mullen
- Genesis Rodriguez as Gabriela Conlon
- Giulia Cicciari as Catelyn Conlon
- Carrington Meyer as Lily Conlon
- Gavin-Keith Umeh as Officer Randle
- Malcolm Goodwin as Officer Colston
- Beau Knapp as Kenan Boyle
- Lois Smith as Margaret Conlon, Jimmy's mother
- Aubrey Joseph as Curtis 'Legs' Banks
- Lisa Branch as Angela Banks
- Holt McCallany as Frank
- Daniel Stewart Sherman as Brendan
- John Cenatiempo as Paul
- Andy Murray as Tommy
- Roderick Hill as Billy Conlon
- Jessica Ecklund as Frank's wife
- Radivoje Bukvić as Victor Grezda
- Tony Naumovski as Samir
- Dan Domingues as Uncle Ricky
- Dennis Duswalt as Dirty Cop
- Nick Nolte (uncredited) as Eddie Conlon

== Production ==
In January 2012, Warner Bros. acquired Brad Ingelsby's script The All-Nighter for a six-figure sum. During the following November, Liam Neeson entered negotiations to star in the film and became a lock in January 2013. At this time, director Jaume Collet-Serra became attached to the film and the title was changed to Run All Night.

Principal photography began on October 3, 2013.

=== Music ===
The musical score for Run All Night was composed by Junkie XL. Discussing the leitmotifs, Junkie XL said, "I thought it was much more interesting to look at this movie from an emotional point of view instead of from an actioner point of view." The score was recorded at the Eastwood Scoring Stage at Warner Bros. Studios, featuring a 70-piece string orchestra and a large low brass ensemble. A soundtrack album was released on March 10, 2015, through WaterTower Music.

Instrumentation:

- String: violins, violas, cellos, double basses (70 players)
- Brass: 12 French horns, 8 trombones, bass trombones, cimbasso

Other songs featured in the film include:

- "Christmas Auld Lang Syne" by Bobby Darin
- "You Spin Me Round (Like a Record)" by Dope
- "Nasty" by Nas
- "No Way Out" by Dope
- "Fairytale of New York" (feat. Kristy MacColl) by The Pogues

== Reception ==
=== Home media ===
The film was released on DVD and Blu-ray on June 16, 2015.

=== Box office ===
Run All Night grossed $26.5 million in the United States and Canada, and $45.1 million in other territories, for a worldwide total of $71.56 million, against a budget of $50 million.

In its opening weekend, the film grossed $11 million from 3,171 theaters, finishing second at the box office behind Cinderella ($70.1 million). The audience was 52% female (considered high for an all-male cast action film) and 86% over the age of 25. It fell 54.3% to $5 million in its second weekend, finishing third.

=== Critical response ===
On the review aggregator website Rotten Tomatoes, 59% of 189 critics' reviews are positive, with an average rating of 5.7/10. The website's consensus reads: "Liam Neeson is in typically fine form, but Run All Night suffers from a convoluted plot and workmanlike execution." Metacritic, which uses a weighted average, assigned the film a score of 59 out of 100, based on 34 critics, indicating "mixed or average" reviews. Audiences polled by CinemaScore, gave the film an average grade of "A−" on an A+ to F scale.
