= Cheli (surname) =

Cheli is an Italian surname. Notable people with the surname include:

- Alberto Cheli (born 1951), Italian singer-songwriter and composer
- Éric Chéli (born 1966), French former racing driver
- Giovanni Cheli (1918–2013), Italian Catholic archbishop and cardinal
- Maurizio Cheli (born 1959), Italian air force officer and astronaut
- Ralph Cheli (1919–1944), United States Army Air Forces officer and Medal of Honor recipient
