= Sali-ye Kuchek =

Sali-ye Kuchek سالي كوچك
- Village
- Location within Iran
- Coordinates: 33°20′52″N 48°25′03″E
- Country: Iran
- Province: Lorestan
- County: Khorramabad
- Bakhsh: Central
- Rural District: Koregah-e Sharqi

Population (2006)
  - Total: 102
- Time zone: UTC+3:30 (IRST)
  - Summer (DST): UTC+4:30 (IRDT)

Sali-ye Kuchek (Persian: سالي كوچك, also Romanized as Salī-ye Kūchek; also known as Salī) is a village in Koregah-e Sharqi Rural District, in the Central District of Khorramabad County, Lorestan Province, Iran. At the 2006 census, its population was 102, in 19 families.
