= Chalelu =

Village in Iran

Chalelu چاللو
- Village
- Location within Iran
- Coordinates: 37°14′21″N 46°16′24″E
- Country: Iran
- Province: East Azerbaijan
- County: Malekan
- Bakhsh: Central
- Rural District: Gavdul-e Sharqi

Population (2006)
  - Total: 42
- Time zone: UTC+3:30 (IRST)
  - Summer (DST): UTC+4:30 (IRDT)

Chalelu (Persian: چاللو, also Romanized as Chālelū; also known as Chālī) is a village in Gavdul-e Sharqi Rural District, in the Central District of Malekan County, East Azerbaijan Province, Iran. At the 2006 census, its population was 42, in 10 families.
