= Elvis Nolasco =

American actor

- Born: New York, New York, U.S.

Elvis Nolasco is an American actor, best known for his roles in the MGM+ crime drama Godfather of Harlem and the ABC anthology series American Crime.

== Biography ==
Nolasco was born and raised in New York City and is of Dominican descent.

Nolasco has made appearances in a number of Spike Lee films including Clockers, Oldboy, and Da Sweet Blood of Jesus.

In 2015, Nolasco portrayed Carter Nix in the first season of American Crime. He returned for the second season to play Chris Dixon, a public school principal.

His latest production work includes the 2022 short fantasy film, Ro & the Stardust, which received noteworthy awards during the 2022 DTLA Film Festival and the Philadelphia Film Festival. In 2018, Nolasco successfully made his directorial debut at the Pan African Film Festival (PAFF) in Los Angeles for his short film, Time 2 Surrender, of which he wrote, produced, directed, and starred in. The film was purchased by FOX Soul TV.

Nolasco can also be seen starring in bilingual films including the 2021 crime drama, Sinaliento, where he was awarded "Best Actor" for his lead role at the 10th Annual Dominican Film Festival In New York.

In 2023, viewers have seen Nolasco playing Nat Pettigrew in Season 3 of Godfather of Harlem, and Jorge Ramirez, a Bakersfield, CA man who was wrongfully killed during a 2013 officer-involved shooting, in docuseries, Killing County.

== Filmography ==
Film and TV performances
Year	Title	Role	Notes
1994	I Like It Like That	Tito	
1995	New York Undercover	Oscar	Episode: "Olde Tyme Religion"
1995	Clockers	Horace	
1995	Law & Order	Dennis	Episode: "Hot Pursuit"
1996	Dance of the Quantum Cats	Miguel	
1996	I'm Not Rappaport	Driver	
1997	Prime Time	Moody	
1997	NYPD Blue	Trevor Botsford	Episode: "The Truth Is Out There"
2000	Third Watch	Hard Brother	Episode: "Four Days"
2002	Rock Steady	Sunshine	
2004	Law & Order: SVU	Andre	Episode: "Mean"
2004	107 Street	Richard	
2005	Miracle's Boys	Abe	3 episodes
2005	Secuestro	Jefe	
2006	The Wannabe	Crime Stoppers Caller #1	
2008	Che	Partygoer #4	
2011	Da Brick	The Real	
2011	Futurestates	Bato	Episode: "White"
2012	Mango Bajito	Jefe	And associate producer
2013	Oldboy	Cortez	
2014	Suddenly	Census Pollster	
2014	Da Sweet Blood of Jesus	Lafayette Hightower	
2015–2016	American Crime	Carter Nix (season 1); Chris Dixon (season 2)	Series regular (seasons 1 and 2)
2017	Roxanne Roxanne	Ray	
2017	Claws	Detective Chip Lauderdale	Recurring role
2017	She's Gotta Have It	Papo "Da Mayor"	Recurring role
2018	All American	J.P. Keating	Recurring role
2019	David Makes Man	Tio-Teo	Recurring role
2019	Godfather of Harlem	Nat Pettigrew	Recurring role
2024	Mr. Crocket	Mr. Crocket	Lead role
2024	Carved	A.J	
2025	Task	Freddy Frias	Miniseries
