= Salli Richardson-Whitfield =

American actress and television director (born 1967)

Salli Richardson
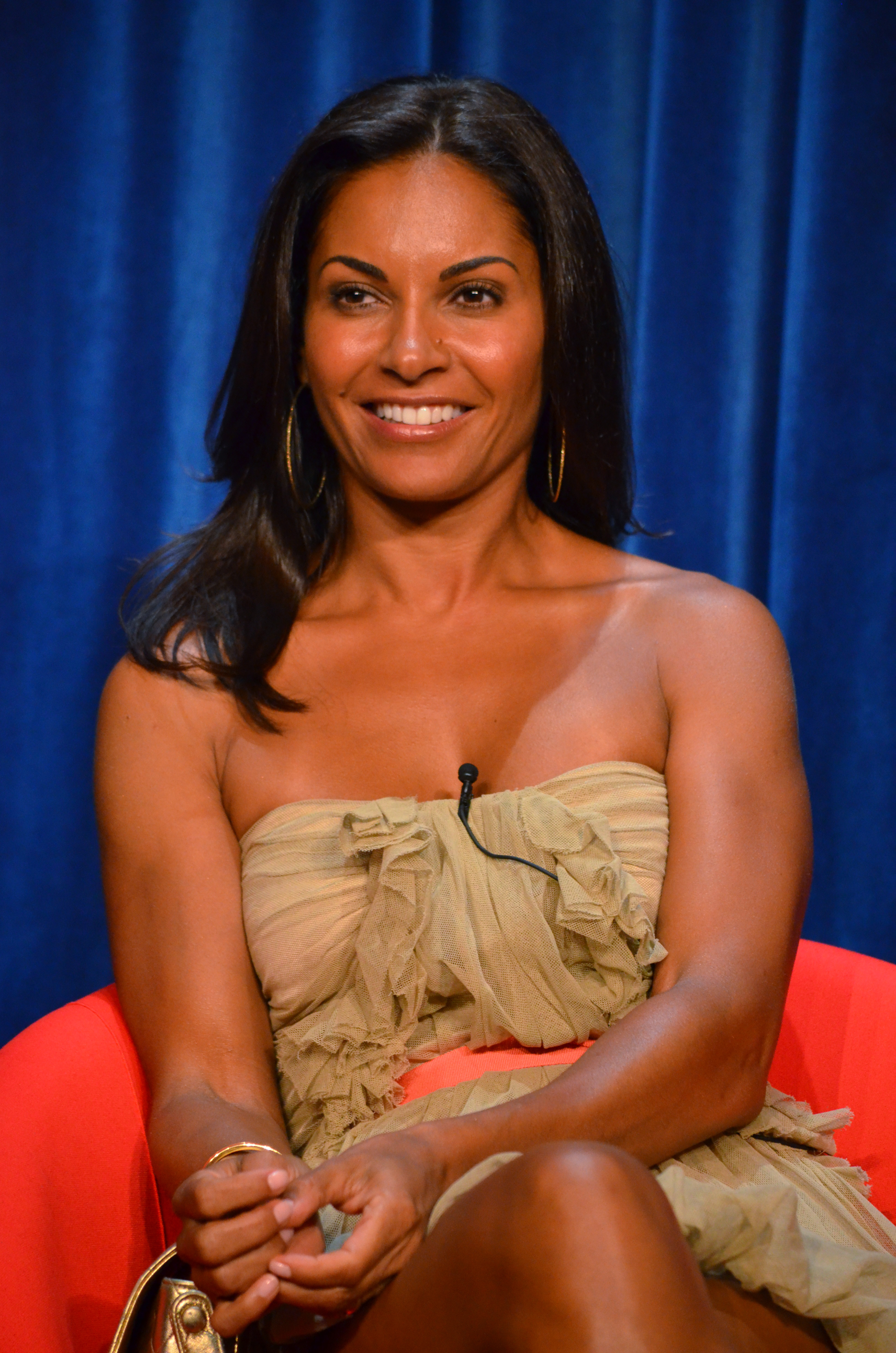
- Richardson in 2012
- Born: Salli Elise Richardson; November 23, 1967 (age 58); Chicago, Illinois, U.S.
- Other name: Salli Richardson-Whitfield
- Occupations: Actress; television director
- Years active: 1991–present
- Spouse: Dondré Whitfield (m. 2002)
- Children: 2
- Website: sallirw.com (defunct)

Salli Elise Richardson-Whitfield (born Salli Elise Richardson, November 23, 1967) is an American actress, television director and producer. as an actress, Richardson is known for her role as Angela in the film A Low Down Dirty Shame (1994) and for her role as Dr. Allison Blake on the Syfy comedy-drama series Eureka (2006–2012).

She is also known for her voice acting as Elisa Maza on the Disney animated series Gargoyles (1994–1996), and as Viveca Foster on the CBS series Family Law (1999–2002). Richardson also has appeared in a number of other films such as The Great White Hype (1996), Antwone Fisher (2002), Anacondas: The Hunt for the Blood Orchid (2004) and I Am Legend (2007). She had leading roles in the independent films Pastor Brown (2009), Black Dynamite (2009) and I Will Follow (2010).

In the 2010s, Richardson started working as a television director and executive producer, receiving five Primetime Emmy Awards nominations. In 2024, she became the first black woman to be nominated for Outstanding Directing for a Drama Series for Winning Time: The Rise of the Lakers Dynasty, and in 2026, she became the first black woman to receive two Outstanding Directing for a Drama series nominations for her works on The Gilded Age and Task.

== Early life ==
Richardson was born in Chicago, Illinois. Her mother is of African American ancestry, and her father was of English and Italian descent. She played tennis in high school at the University of Chicago Laboratory Schools, and launched her acting career in the Kuumba Workshop theater there; she graduated in 1985.

== Career ==
=== Acting ===
Richardson "began her acting career in the theater before transitioning to roles in television and film". In film, she played small roles in Prelude to a Kiss, Mo' Money, Posse, and later had major roles in Sioux City and A Low Down Dirty Shame. From 1994 to 1996 she voiced the character Elisa Maza on the animated series Gargoyles. She had many guest-starring roles in numerous television shows, such as Star Trek: Deep Space Nine, New York Undercover, The Pretender, Stargate SG-1, NYPD Blue, House, Bones, Criminal Minds, NCIS and Castle.

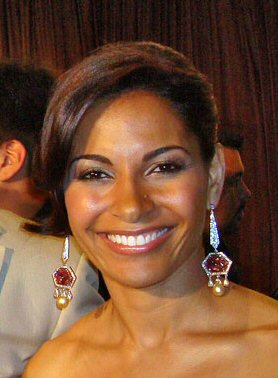
Richardson in 2008

Richardson starred opposite Dixie Carter and Kathleen Quinlan in the CBS legal drama series, Family Law, from 1999 to 2002. She had recurring roles as Nancy Adams on Rude Awakening, and as Laura on CSI: Miami. She starred opposite Denzel Washington in the 2002 drama film Antwone Fisher. She also appeared in the 2004 horror film Anacondas: The Hunt for the Blood Orchid, and starred opposite Will Smith in 2007's post-apocalyptic film I Am Legend. She later had a leading role in the independent dramas Pastor Brown (2009), and in I Will Follow (2010) directed by Ava DuVernay. She also starred in The Sin Seer with Isaiah Washington, set for 2015 release.

From 2006 to 2012, Richardson starred as Department of Defense agent (and later head of Global Dynamics) Allison Blake in the Syfy comedy-drama series Eureka. Her second pregnancy was written into the storyline of the series. After the series' cancellation, she was cast as the lead in the Lifetime drama pilot The Secret Lives of Wives. In 2014, Richardson was cast in a recurring role on Lifetime's The Lottery as the first lady of the United States, but she lost it to Shelley Conn; She also has a role on BET's Being Mary Jane as an old friend of the lead character. In 2015, Richardson was cast in the ABC Family series, Stitchers. The series was canceled after three seasons in 2017.

=== Directing ===
Richardson has also worked as a director of episodic television, her latest being episodes 5 and 6 of the first season of Wheel of Time for Amazon. Following her directorial debut on two episodes of her show Eureka, in 2016 she directed two episodes of Ava DuVernay's drama series for Oprah Winfrey Network, Queen Sugar (on which her husband Dondre Whitfield appears as a series regular). In 2016, Richardson also directed an episode of the historical action-drama Underground for WGN America. In 2017, she directed two episodes of BET drama Rebel, and Shonda Rhimes' Scandal. Her comedy directing credits include Survivor's Remorse, I'm Dying Up Here, Black-ish and Dear White People. In 2018, she also directed the 16th episode of Agents of S.H.I.E.L.D.'s fifth-season episode "Inside Voices". Her other notable directing credits include Chicago Med, Luke Cage, Black Lightning, The Punisher, American Gods, See and Altered Carbon.

In 2019, Richardson received an NAACP Image Award for Outstanding Directing in a Drama Series nomination for her work directing "I Get Physical" episode of Luke Cage. Also in 2019, she won a Black Reel Award for Outstanding Directing in a Comedy Series for directing "Black Like Us" episode of Black-ish. In September 2020, she signed a project development deal with HBO. Richardson produces and had had directed episodes of HBO period drama The Gilded Age and Adam McKay's Winning Time: The Rise of the Lakers Dynasty. Also in 2020, she directed the Zoom Where It Happens special The One with the Diverse Cast, a Friends one-night reboot starring Sterling K. Brown, Uzo Aduba, Ryan Michelle Bathe, Aisha Hinds, Kendrick Sampson and Jeremy Pope.

In 2024, she became the first black woman to be nominated for Outstanding Directing for a Drama Series in 76th Primetime Emmy Awards for her work on "BEAT L.A." episode of Winning Time: The Rise of the Lakers Dynasty.

In 2026, she became the first black woman to receive two Outstanding Directing for a Drama series nominations for her works on "My Mind Is Made Up" episode of The Gilded Age and "Out beyond ideas of wrongdoing and rightdoing, there is a river." episode of Task in 78th Primetime Emmy Awards.

== Personal life ==
In September 2002, she married fellow actor Dondre Whitfield. She and Whitfield have one daughter and one son.

== Filmography ==
=== Film ===
Year	Title	Role
1991	Up Against the Wall	Denise
1992	Prelude to a Kiss	Bridesmaid No. 2
1992	Mo' Money	Pretty Customer
1992	How U Like Me Now	Valerie
1993	Posse	Lana
1994	I Spy Returns	Nicole Scott
1994	Sioux City	Jolene Buckley
1994	A Low Down Dirty Shame	Angela
1994	Lily in Winter	Ada Covington
1995	Gargoyles the Movie: The Heroes Awaken	Elisa Maza (voice)
1995	Once Upon a Time...When We Were Colored	Miss Alice
1996	Soul of the Game	Lahoma
1996	The Great White Hype	Bambi
1997	True Women	Martha
1998	Butter	Blusette Ford
1999	Lillie	Lillie
2002	Book of Love: The Definitive Reason Why Men Are Dogs	Karen
2002	Antwone Fisher	Berta Davenport
2002	Baby of the Family	Nelli McPherson
2003	Biker Boyz	Half & Half
2004	Anacondas: The Hunt for the Blood Orchid	Gail Stern
2007	I Am Legend	Zoe Neville
2009	Black Dynamite	Gloria
2009	Pastor Brown	Jessica "Jesse" Brown
2010	I Will Follow	Maye
2012	We the Party	Principal Reynolds
2013	Playin' for Love	Talisa McCoy
2013	Teachers	Christine
2015	The Sin Seer	Nia

=== Television ===
Year	Title	Role	Notes
1992	Silk Stalkings	Shelley	Episode: "Wild Card"
1993	Space Rangers	-	Episode: "Fort Hope"
1993	Star Trek: Deep Space Nine	Fenna/Nidell	Episode: "Second Sight"
1994	Roc	Diane Hubbard	Episode: "The Last Temptation of Roc"
1994	New York Undercover	Tammy Barrett	Episode: "Eyewitness Blues"
1994–1997	Gargoyles	Elisa Maza (voice)	Main cast
1997	Stargate SG-1	Drey'auc	Episode: "Bloodlines"
1997	Between Brothers	Vanessa	Episode: "The Player"
1998	The Pretender	Cynthia Sloan	Episode: "Gigolo Jarod"
1998–1999	Mercy Point	Kim Salisaw	Main cast
1999	The Jamie Foxx Show	Camille Turner	Episode: "Liar, Liar, Pants on Fire"
1999–2002	Family Law	Viveca Foster	Main cast
2000	Secret Agent Man	Rachel	Episode: "WhupSumAss"
2000–2001	Rude Awakening	Nancy Adams	Recurring cast: season 3
2003	CSI: Miami	Laura	Recurring cast: season 1
2004	Line of Fire	Erica Logan	Episode: "The Senator"
2004	Second Time Around	Amanda	Episode: "Coupling Up"
2004	NYPD Blue	Bobbi Kingston	2 episodes: "My Dinner with Andy" & "I Like Ike"
2005	House	Sharon	Episode: "Sports Medicine"
2005	1-800-Missing	Kelly	Episode: "Sisterhood"
2005	The War at Home	Vanessa	Episode: "Guess Who's Coming to the Barbecue"
2006	Bones	Kim Kurland	Episode: "Aliens in a Spaceship"
2006–2012	Eureka	Allison Blake	Main cast
2009	Criminal Minds	Tamara Barnes	2 episodes: "Hopeless" & "The Eyes Have It"
2011	The Secret Lives of Wives	Reed	TV pilot
2012	The Finder	Athena Brookes	Episode: "Life After Death"
2012–2013	The Newsroom	Jane Barrow	Guest: season 1, recurring cast: season 2
2013–2015	NCIS	Carrie Clark	Guest Cast: season 11-13
2014	House of Lies	Sandra Joy	Episode: "Power(less)"
2014	Castle	Elizabeth Weston	Episode: "The Greater Good"
2015	Being Mary Jane	Valerie	Recurring cast: season 2
2015–2017	Stitchers	Maggie	Main cast
2016	Rosewood	Dr. Aubrey Joseph	Episode: "Wooberite & the Women of Rosewood"
2018	Black Lightning	Rebecca Montez	Episode: "The Book of Consequences: Chapter Four: Translucent Freak"
2020	Altered Carbon	Commission Leader	Episode: "Broken Angels"

=== Director ===
Year	Title	Notes
2011	Grace	Short film, also writer
2011–2013	Eureka	2 episodes: "Worst Case Scenario" & "Omega Girls"
2015	Different Position	Short film
2016	Post Life	Short film
2016	Queen Sugar	2 episode: "So Far" & "All Good"
2017	Underground	Episode: "Nok Aaut"
2017	Rebel	2 episodes: "Conceal and Carry" & "Black Not Blue"
2017	Scandal	Episode: "Tick Tock"
2017	Stitchers	Episode: "Kill It Forward"
2017	Survivor's Remorse	2 episodes: "Reparations" & "Closure"
2017	Lethal Weapon	Episode: "Birdwatching"
2017–2019	Shadowhunters	2 episodes: "A Kiss from a Rose" & "Dust and Shadows"
2018	Chicago Med	Episode: "Lock It Down"
2018	Star	Episode: "Take It to Church"
2018	Agents of S.H.I.E.L.D.	Episode: "Inside Voices"
2018	I'm Dying Up Here	Episode: "Between Us"
2018	Luke Cage	Episode: "I Get Physical"
2018	Love Is_	Episode: "Not Valentine's Day"
2018	Black Lightning	Episode: "The Book of Consequences: Chapter Four: Translucent Freak"
2018–2019	The Magicians	2 episodes: "The Side Effect" & "Six Short Stories About Magic"
2019	Black-ish	Episode: "Black Like Us"
2019	The Punisher	Episode: "Flustercluck"
2019	All American	Episode: "Legacy"
2019	Chilling Adventures of Sabrina	Episode: "Chapter Fourteen: Lupercallia"
2019	American Gods	Episode: "The Ways of the Dead"
2019	Doom Patrol	Episode: "Hair Patrol"
2019	The Chi	Episode: "Lean into It"
2019	Dear White People	2 episodes: "Volume 3: Chapter IX " & "Volume 2: Chapter V"
2019	Pearson	Episode: "The Former City Attorney"
2019	See	Episode: "House of Enlightenment"
2019	Reprisal	Episode: "dammit"
2019	Treadstone	2 episodes: "The Seoul Asylum" & "The McKenna Erasure"
2020	Altered Carbon	2 episodes: "Broken Angels" & "Experiment Perilous"
2021	The Wheel of Time	2 episodes: "Blood Calls Blood" & "The Flame of Tar Valon"
2022–present	The Gilded Age	6 episodes; also executive producer
2022–2023	Winning Time: The Rise of the Lakers Dynasty	5 episodes; also executive producer
2025–present	Task	3 episodes; also executive producer

== Awards and nominations ==
Year	Award	Category	Nominated work	Result	Ref.
2010	NAACP Image Awards	Outstanding Actress in a Comedy Series	Eureka	Nominated	
2014	Black Reel Awards	Outstanding Actress, TV Movie/Limited Series	Pastor Brown	Nominated	
2019	Black Reel Awards	Outstanding Directing in a Comedy Series	Black-ish (for "Black Like Us")	Won	
2019	NAACP Image Awards	NAACP Image Award for Outstanding Directing in a Drama Series.	Luke Cage (for "I Get Physical")	Nominated	
2022	Hugo Awards	Best Dramatic Presentation – Short Form	The Wheel of Time (for "The Flame of Tar Valon")	Nominated	
2024	Gracie Awards	Director – Drama	Winning Time: The Rise of the Lakers Dynasty	Won	
2024	Gracie Awards	Producer – Entertainment	The Gilded Age	Won	
2024	Primetime Emmy Awards	Outstanding Drama Series	The Gilded Age	Nominated	
2024	Primetime Emmy Awards	Outstanding Directing for a Drama Series	Winning Time: The Rise of the Lakers Dynasty (for "BEAT L.A.")	Nominated	
2026	Primetime Emmy Awards	Outstanding Drama Series	The Gilded Age	Nominated	
2026	Primetime Emmy Awards	Outstanding Directing for a Drama Series	The Gilded Age (for "My Mind Is Made Up")	Nominated	
2026	Primetime Emmy Awards	Outstanding Directing for a Drama Series	Task (for "Out beyond ideas of wrongdoing and rightdoing, there is a river.")	Nominated	
