= Jeremiah Zagar =

American filmmaker

Jeremiah Zagar (/ˈzeɪɡɑːr/; born 1981) is an American filmmaker. He has directed the feature films We the Animals (2018) and Hustle (2022). The former was nominated for five categories at the 34th Independent Spirit Awards. He also directed the 2008 documentary In a Dream, which is about his father Isaiah Zagar.

== Personal life ==
Zagar was born in South Philadelphia. His father was mosaic artist Isaiah Zagar.

== Filmography ==
Year	Film	Credited as					
Year	Film	Director	Producer	Writer	Cinematographer	Editor	Notes
2003	The Unbelievable Truth	No	No	Yes	No	Yes	Short film
2004	Baby Eat Baby	Yes	No	Yes	Yes	Yes	Short film
2005	Coney Island 1945	Yes	No	Yes	No	No	Short film
2006	The Dawn	No	No	No	No	Yes	
2007	Zoom in: Stories Behind the Best Independent Films of 2007	No	No	No	Yes	No	
2008	In a Dream	Yes	No	No	No	Yes	Documentary
2008	Paints on Ceiling	Yes	No	No	No	No	Short film
2009	Orgasm Inc.	No	No	No	No	Yes	Documentary
2009	Welcome to Shelbyville	No	No	No	No	Yes	Documentary
2010	Starved for Attention: USA	Yes	No	No	No	Yes	Documentary short
2010	Starved for Attention: Mexico	Yes	No	No	No	No	Documentary short
2010	Starved for Attention: Burkina Faso	Yes	No	No	No	Yes	Documentary short
2011	Remains	Yes	No	Yes	No	Yes	Short film
2012	A Sister's Call	No	No	No	Yes	No	Documentary
2012	Heart Stop Beating	Yes	No	No	No	Yes	Short film
2012	The Last Ice Merchant	No	No	No	No	Yes	Documentary short
2012	Flatline	Yes	No	No	No	Yes	Documentary short
2012	Alagoas: Brighton	Yes	No	No	No	No	Music video
2013	Always a Fire	Yes	No	No	No	No	Documentary short
2014	Captivated: The Trials of Pamela Smart	Yes	No	No	No	No	Documentary
2015	Pink Boy	No	No	Yes	No	No	Documentary short
2017	Voyeur	No	Yes	No	No	No	Documentary
2018	Sidelined	No	Yes	No	No	No	Documentary short
2018	We the Animals	Yes	No	Yes	No	No	
2019	One in a Million	Yes	No	No	No	No	Short film
2022	Hustle	Yes	No	No	No	No	
2025	Task	Yes	Executive	No	No	No	
