= Margarita Levieva =

American actress

- Маргарита Левиева
- Levieva in 2026
- Born: Russian SFSR
- Citizenship: American
- Education: New York University (BA); William Esper Studio
- Occupation: Actress
- Years active: 2004–present
- Children: 1

Margarita Vladimirovna Levieva is a Russian-American actress. She is best known for portraying Annie Newton in The Invisible, Abby Parker in The Deuce, Mother Koril in Star Wars: The Acolyte, and Heather Glenn in Daredevil: Born Again.

== Early life ==
Levieva was born in Russia, into a Russian Jewish family. Both of her grandmothers, as children, survived the siege of Leningrad during World War II. From the age of three, she began to engage in rhythmic gymnastics.

Levieva immigrated to the United States at age 11 with her mother and twin brother, Michael, and settled in Sheepshead Bay, Brooklyn. Though she was accepted into LaGuardia High School to study dance, she instead attended public high school in Secaucus, New Jersey. In addition to working full-time as a fashion buyer, Levieva graduated a year early from New York University with a double major in economics and psychology and minors in philosophy, sociology, and Russian history.

== Career ==
In 2005, Levieva made a guest appearance on Law & Order: Trial by Jury and in the following two years starred in the Fox series Vanished and feature films The Invisible, Billy's Choice, and Noise.

Levieva starred in the 2019 independent film Inherit the Viper. Her other film credits include It Happened in L.A. (2017), The Diary of a Teenage Girl (2015), Sleeping with Other People (2015), James White (2015), For Ellen (2012), The Lincoln Lawyer (2011), Adventureland (2009), and Spread (2009).

In 2009, Levieva made an appearance in the HBO comedy-drama series How to Make it in America, and in the NBC drama Kings, in the episode "First Night". That same year, she starred in the play The Retributionists, and made her Broadway debut in Impressionism.

In the 2010s Levieva had regular series roles in ABC drama series Revenge (2011–2015) and in HBO series The Deuce (2016–2019), playing adventurous college student Abby Parker in the latter.

In 2022, Levieva starred as Jenny Franklin in the Netflix series In From the Cold, which aired for one season.

In 2024, she appeared in the Star Wars series The Acolyte as Mother Koril. In 2025, she starred in the Marvel Cinematic Universe series Daredevil: Born Again as Heather Glenn, the love interest of Matt Murdock/Daredevil.

== Personal life ==
Levieva and Sebastian Stan were romantically linked in July 2014.

The actress announced that she had given birth on May 14, 2022. She revealed her baby was a boy on May 14, 2023.

== Filmography ==
=== Film ===
Year	Title	Role	Notes
2005	English		Audio
2007	David's Apartment	Deedee	
2007	The Invisible	Annie Newton	
2007	Salted Nuts	Alyssa	
2007	Noise	Ekaterina Filippovna	
2009	Spread	Heather	
2009	Adventureland	Lisa P.	
2011	The Lincoln Lawyer	Regina Campo	
2011	The Stand Up	Veronica	
2012	For Ellen	Claire Taylor	
2013	Knights of Badassdom	Beth	
2014	Skoryy Moskva-Rossiya	Mila	
2014	The Loft	Vicky Fry	
2015	The Diary of a Teenage Girl	Tabatha	
2015	Sleeping with Other People	Hannah	
2017	It Happened in L.A.	Ingrid	
2018	Future World	Lei	
2019	Inherit the Viper	Josie Riley	
2026	The Gymnast	Stephanie	
2026	Behemoth!	TBA	Post-Production

=== Television ===
Year	Title	Role	Notes
2005	N.Y.-70	Cindy	Unsold TV pilot
2005	Law & Order: Trial by Jury	Stephanie Davis	Episode: "Skeleton"
2006	The Prince	Isabelle	Unsold TV pilot
2006	What's Not to Love?	Blake	Unsold TV pilot
2006	Vanished	Marcy Collins	Main role; 13 episodes
2009	Kings	Claudia	Episode: "First Night"
2010–2011	How to Make It in America	Julie	Recurring role; 6 episodes
2011–2013	Revenge	Amanda Clarke / Emily Thorne	Recurring role; 24 episodes
2013–2016	The Blacklist	Gina Zanetakos	Recurring role; 5 episodes
2015	Allegiance	Natalie O'Connor	Main role; 13 episodes
2016–2019	We Bare Bears	Yana	2 episodes: "Icy Nights" and "Icy Nights II"
2017–2019	The Deuce	Abby Parker	Main role; 25 episodes
2022	In From the Cold	Jenny Franklin	Main role; 8 episodes
2022	Litvinenko	Marina Litvinenko	Main role; 4 episodes
2024	Star Wars: The Acolyte	Mother Koril	3 episodes
2025–2027	Daredevil: Born Again	Heather Glenn / Muse	Main role; 14 episodes
2025	Task	Eryn	5 episodes
2026	Cape Fear	Lexi	Miniseries

=== Music videos ===
Year	Title	Artist	Role	Notes
2016	"Fire Away"	Chris Stapleton	Sheriff's wife	Music Video of the Year at the 2016 Country Music Association Awards
