= Shali, East Azerbaijan =

Shali شالي
- Village
- Location within Iran
- Coordinates: 38°14′55″N 46°36′52″E
- Country: Iran
- Province: East Azerbaijan
- County: Heris
- Bakhsh: Khvajeh
- Rural District: Mavazekhan-e Shomali

Population (2006)
  - Total: 49
- Time zone: UTC+3:30 (IRST)
  - Summer (DST): UTC+4:30 (IRDT)

Shali (Persian: شالي, also Romanized as Shālī and Shāllī; also known as Chāli, Chaly, Salī, and Sāllī) is a village in Mavazekhan-e Shomali Rural District, Khvajeh District, Heris County, East Azerbaijan Province, Iran. At the 2006 census, its population was 49, in 14 families.
