= Stephanie Kurtzuba =

American actress

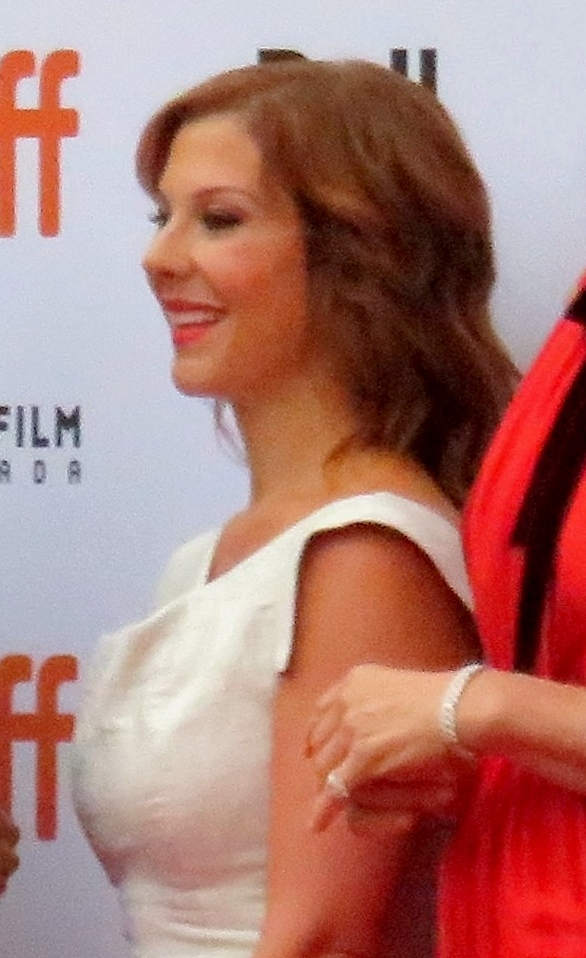
- Kurtzuba at the 2019 Toronto International Film Festival
- Education: NYU Tisch School of the Arts
- Occupation: Actress
- Years active: 2001–present
- Spouse: Joshua Coakley (m. 2005)
- Children: 2
- Website: stephaniekurtzuba.com

Stephanie Kurtzuba is an American film, television, and theater actress. She is best known for her roles in the films The Wolf of Wall Street (2013), Annie (2014), and The Irishman (2019), and on television in recurring roles on The Good Wife and Blue Bloods.

== Early life and education ==
Kurtzuba, who is of Polish heritage, was raised in Omaha, Nebraska, where she graduated from Omaha Central High School. Growing up, she performed in local theater productions, with her first role at the age of 10 as an orphan pickpocket in the musical Oliver, and won the Miss Nebraska Pre-Teen pageant. She briefly attended the University of Nebraska–Lincoln, where she studied journalism, before being accepted to New York University's Tisch School of the Arts, where she earned an acting degree.

== Career ==
=== Theater ===
After graduating, she spent time performing in experimental off-off-Broadway productions, before going into commercial theater. Her first Broadway show was as part of a backup trio to Hugh Jackman in The Boy from Oz in 2003. As a member of the original Broadway casts of Mary Poppins in 2006 and Billy Elliot the Musical in 2008, she performed at the 2007 and 2009 Tony Awards. Her Off-Broadway credits include the 2018 revival of Stephen Adly Guirgis' Our Lady of 121st St., directed by Phylicia Rashad for Signature Theatre, The Joys of Sex, directed by Jeremy Dobrish for Variety Arts Theater, and Bat Boy: The Musical, directed by Scott Schwartz at the Union Square Theatre.

=== Film ===
Kurtzuba portrayed Mrs. Kovacevic, a social services clerk with a Russian accent, in the 2014 film adaptation of Annie. Her performance was praised in the Los Angeles Times and Variety. She is featured on the song "I Think I'm Gonna Like It Here" on the Annie soundtrack album. In The Wolf of Wall Street, directed by Martin Scorsese, she played Kimmie Belzer, a single mom hired by Jordan Belfort (Leonardo DiCaprio) and the only female stockbroker at the company. In the Scorsese Netflix film The Irishman, starring Al Pacino and Robert De Niro, she portrays Irene, the wife of De Niro's character. She also appeared in Extremely Loud & Incredibly Close and Away We Go opposite John Krasinski.

=== Television ===
Kurtzuba had recurring roles as Olivia on The Good Wife on CBS, as Sergeant (and later Captain) Paula McNichols on Blue Bloods, as cult member Sabrina on The Leftovers on HBO, and on the Paramount Network miniseries Waco. She has also appeared on Law & Order: Special Victims Unit on NBC, Elementary on CBS, and Bull on CBS.

== Personal life ==
Kurtzuba married Joshua Coakley in 2005. They met when Kurtzuba was performing in a show at the Alley Theatre in Houston, and Coakley was working on the show in the props department. They live in New York City and have two sons.

Kurtzuba co-owns West Lanes Bowling Center in Omaha with her father and two siblings. Her maternal grandparents built the bowling alley in 1955.

Kurtzuba is also a model and has been the spokesperson for Red Baron Pizza since 2017.

== Filmography ==
=== Film ===
Year	Title	Role
2004	Knots	Sheila
2008	Parting Words	Brenda Turko
2009	Away We Go	Performance Mom
2011	Extremely Loud & Incredibly Close	Elaine Black
2013	The Wolf of Wall Street	Kimmie Belzer
2014	Before I Disappear	Blonde Woman
2014	Annie	Mrs. Kovacevic
2018	To Dust	Receptionist
2019	Bad Education	Carol Schweitzer
2019	The Irishman	Irene Sheeran
2023	The Machine	LeeAnn Kreischer
2023	Fish Out of Water	Brenda
2024	Fly Me to the Moon	Jolene Vanning
2024	A Christmas in New Hope	Jackie Zinn

=== Television ===
Year	Title	Role	Notes
2004	Law & Order	Janet	Episode: The Brotherhood"
2006	Related	Waitress	Episode: "His Name Is Ruth"
2006	Numb3rs	Publicist	Episode: "All's Fair"
2010–2014	The Good Wife	Olivia Suconik	4 episodes
2013	Elementary	Eileen Rourke	Episode: "Risk Management"
2013	Do No Harm	Nadia Cross	Episode: "Six Feet Deep"
2014	The Leftovers	Sabrina	2 episodes
2014	Law & Order: Special Victims Unit	Joan Harris	Episode: "Glasgowman's Wrath"
2016	Chicago P.D.	Detective Ricci	Episode: "The Silos"
2017	#MotherJudger	Deb	Web series
2018	Bull	Rebecca Lexington	Episode: "Kill Shot"
2018	Waco	Carol Noesner	Miniseries; 3 episodes
2018	The Good Cop	Evelyn	Episode: "Will Cora Get Married?"
2019	The Enemy Within	Desiree Villareal	Episode: "An Offer"
2019	The Good Fight	Olivia Suconik	Episode: "The One Where Diane and Liz Topple Democracy"
2019–2024	Blue Bloods	Sergeant/Captain Paula McNichols	Recurring
2020	Grey's Anatomy	Opal	2 episodes
2021	Station 19	Opal	Episode: "Train in Vain"
2021	Dynasty	Katie Loftland	2 episodes
2021	The Blacklist	Eva Mason	Episode: "Eva Mason (No. 181)"
2021	The Watcher	Helen Graff	Episode: "Götterdämmerung"
2022–2023	Tulsa King	Clara Truisi	Recurring
2025–present	Your Friends & Neighbors	Diane Miller	Recurring
2025	Task	Donna	2 episodes

=== Theatre ===
Year	Title	Role	Notes
2001	Bat Boy: The Musical	Shelly (u/s)	Off-Broadway
2003–2004	The Boy from Oz	Trio member / Ensemble; Judy Garland (u/s)	Broadway
2004	The Joys of Sex	Stephs Nolton/Gladys/Brandi	Off-Broadway
2004–2005	Newsical	Performer	Off-Broadway
2005	A Mother, A Daughter, and A Gun	Eleanor/Cheryl; Jess (u/s)	Off-Broadway
2006–2007	Mary Poppins	Swing	Broadway
2008–2009	Billy Elliot the Musical	Lesley / Dancer / Ensemble; Dead Mum (u/s)	Broadway
2018	Our Lady of 121st Street	Marcia	Off-Broadway
