= Brad Ingelsby =

American screenwriter and film producer (born 1980)

- Born: January 4, 1980 (age 46); Berwyn, Pennsylvania, U.S.
- Education: Villanova University
- Occupation: Screenwriter
- Years active: 2006–present
- Father: Tom Ingelsby
- Relatives: Martin Ingelsby (brother)

Brad Ingelsby (born January 4, 1980) is an American screenwriter and film producer.

== Early life and education ==
Ingelsby is the son of basketball player and coach Tom Ingelsby and Rose Ingelsby. His brother Martin Ingelsby is also a basketball coach. He grew up in Berwyn, Pennsylvania and attended Archbishop John Carroll High School, a Catholic secondary school in Radnor, Pennsylvania where he was coached by his uncle, Fran Inglesby.

Brad Ingelsby graduated from Villanova University, a Catholic University in Villanova, Pennsylvania, with a business degree. After graduating, he taught at St. Patrick's School in Malvern, Pennsylvania. Ingelsby attended the American Film Institute as a graduate student in screenwriting. He took a job at Cedar Point amusement park in Sandusky, Ohio after his first year as a graduate student, where he came up with a story about a character who was released from jail; he wrote The Low Dweller, a screenplay, based on this story.

== Career ==
After graduating from AFI, Ingelsby sent The Low Dweller to Focus Features executive Mike Pruss. After returning to Pennsylvania, Ingelsby was informed that Leonardo DiCaprio wished to star in the film and Ridley Scott wanted to direct it. The Low Dweller was rewritten and was released as Out of the Furnace in 2013, starring Christian Bale and Woody Harrelson.

In 2015, Ingelsby wrote Run All Night, starring Liam Neeson and Ed Harris. Ingelsby wrote the character study American Woman, starring Sienna Miller in 2018. In 2020, Ingelsby's The Way Back was released. It featured Ben Affleck and is about a basketball coach trying to help a high school team excel as well as improve his personal life. The Way Back was based on a spec script by Ingelsby entitled "The Has-Been."

Ingelsby wrote and produced the HBO series Mare of Easttown. The success of the show led to a three-year deal with HBO. He also wrote and executive produced the television series Task for HBO.

== Filmography ==
Year	Title	Writer	Producer	Notes
2006	The Honeyfields	Yes	No	Short film
2011	The Dynamiter	Yes	No	
2013	Out of the Furnace	Yes	No	
2015	Run All Night	Yes	No	
2018	American Woman	Yes	Executive	
2019	Our Friend	Yes	Executive	
2020	The Way Back	Yes	Executive	
2021	Mare of Easttown	Yes	Executive	TV miniseries
2025	Echo Valley	Yes	Yes	
2025	The Lost Bus	Yes	Yes	
2025-present	Task	Yes	Executive	TV series
