= List of people from Glasgow =

This list covers famous or notable people or groups who were born or raised in Glasgow, Scotland or have been connected with it.

== Arts ==
=== Architecture ===
- David Hamilton (1768–1843), architect
- Charles Rennie Mackintosh (1868–1928), architect and designer
- Alexander "Greek" Thomson (1817–1875), architect

=== Film ===
- Bill Forsyth (born 1946), film director
- May Miles Thomas (born 1959), screenwriter, filmmaker
- Chris Quick (born 1988), independent filmmaker and director of Glasgow Filmmakers Alliance

=== Journalism ===
- Lawrence Donegan – journalist
- Ross Finlay – motoring journalist, travel writer and broadcaster
- Johann Hari – journalist
- Jack House – journalist, writer and broadcaster
- Andrew Marr – journalist, writer and television presenter
- Jack Webster – journalist

=== Literature ===
- Freddie Anderson – socialist playwright and poet originally from Ireland
- James Bridie – playwright
- Catherine Carswell – novelist and biographer of the Scottish Renaissance
- A. J. Cronin – doctor and novelist
- Ivor Cutler – poet, songwriter, humourist
- Lavinia Derwent – children's writer
- Alasdair Gray – artist, novelist and essayist
- Pearse Hutchinson – poet
- James Kelman – novelist
- Tom Leonard – poet
- Liz Lochhead – poet and playwright
- Peter May – crime writer
- Edwin Morgan – poet and translator
- Grant Morrison – comic book author
- Tony Roper – actor, television writer, author
- Suhayl Saadi – physician, novelist, playwright, anthologist; co-editor of A Fictional Guide to Scotland
- J David Simons – author
- Alan Spence – novelist and poet
- Douglas Stuart – novelist
- Nigel Tranter – historical novelist

=== Performing arts ===
- Moyo Akandé – actress
- John Barrowman – singer and actor (The Producers, Torchwood)
- Sean Biggerstaff – actor (Harry Potter)
- Billy Boyd – actor (The Lord of the Rings)
- Frankie Boyle – comedian
- Kevin Bridges – comedian
- John Cairney – actor
- Peter Capaldi – actor (The Thick of It, In the Loop, Doctor Who)
- Robert Carlyle – actor (Trainspotting, The World Is Not Enough)
- Lawrence Chaney – drag queen and winner of the second series of RuPaul's Drag Race UK
- Morven Christie – actress
- Robbie Coltrane – actor (Harry Potter, Cracker)
- Billy Connolly – comedian (The Man Who Sued God)
- Kate Copstick – actress and director
- Tony Curran – actor
- Iain De Caestecker – actor (The Fades, Young James Herriot, Agents of S.H.I.E.L.D.)
- Karen Dunbar – comedian and actress
- Craig Ferguson – actor and writer
- Gregor Fisher – comedian
- Laura Fraser – actress
- Rikki Fulton – comedian
- Michelle Gomez – actress (Doctor Who, Green Wing)
- Greg Hemphill – actor
- Olaf Hytten – actor
- Ford Kiernan – actor
- Mark Knopfler – Musician, songwriter, soundtrack writer, guitarist
- Gary Lewis – actor
- Brian Limond – comedian and actor
- Marie Loftus – music hall entertainer
- Kelly Macdonald – actress (Trainspotting, Boardwalk Empire)
- Angus Macfadyen – actor
- Freya Mavor – actress (Skins)
- James McAvoy – actor
- David McCallum – actor, first noted for playing secret agent Illya Kuryakin
- Rory McCann – actor
- Jane McCarry – actress
- Joe McFadden – actor (Holby City, Heartbeat)
- Des McLean – comedian and actor
- Graham McTavish – actor
- Alec Newman – actor
- David O'Hara – actor
- Daniel Portman – actor
- Richard Rankin – actor
- Maurice Roëves – actor
- Jerry Sadowitz – comedian
- John Gordon Sinclair – actor
- Dawn Steele – actress
- Brian Vernel – actor
- Susan Calman – comedian and actor
- Jonathan Watson – actor

=== Visual arts ===
- Jacqueline Donachie – artist
- Hannah Frank – artist and sculptor
- John Glashan – cartoonist
- Clare Hunter, writer and artist
- Lucy McKenzie – artist
- Bud Neill – cartoonist (Lobey Dosser)
- Cordelia Oliver – artist, writer and art critic
- Frank Quitely – comic book artist
- Joseph Urie – artist

== Business ==
- William Beardmore – Beardmores, Parkhead Forge, Arrol-Johnston motor company
- George Bogle of Daldowie – wealthy tobacco merchant
- William Burrell – shipping magnate and philanthropist
- Catherine Cranston – tearoom proprietor
- William Cunninghame – tobacco merchant
- John Glassford – wealthy tobacco merchant, partner in Thistle Bank
- Thomas Lipton – entrepreneur, Lipton Tea
- Norman Macfarlane, Baron Macfarlane of Bearsden – entrepreneur
- James McAlpin – merchant tailor
- James McGill – businessman and philanthropist
- Robert Napier – co-founder of Cunard Line
- Reo Stakis – entrepreneur
- Charles Tennant – St. Rollox Chemicals Works

== Civic ==
=== Founder ===
- Saint Mungo – traditional founder of the city

=== Campaigners ===
- Janie Allan – suffrage activist
- Mary Barbour – rent strikes activist
- Ian Dunn – gay and paedophile rights activist
- Deborah Knox Livingston – temperance and suffrage activist

=== Crime and punishment ===
- Ian Brady – violent criminal
- Archibald Hall – murderer
- Allan Pinkerton – detective
- Edward William Pritchard – murderer who was publicly executed in Glasgow and was the last person to be publicly executed in Scotland

=== Law ===
- Madge Easton Anderson – lawyer

=== Provosts ===
- George Elphinstone (died 1634) – Lord Provost and courtier

== Education ==
- Mary Ellen Bews – New Zealand school principal and educationalist, born in Glasgow
- Mary Cranston Mason (1846–1932) – social reformer, temperance leader, Glasgow school board member

== Humanities ==
- David Stow Adam – theologian
- C. A. Campbell – metaphysical philosopher
- William Purdie Dickson – scholar
- Niall Ferguson – historian and writer
- William MacAskill – philosopher and ethicist
- Alasdair MacIntyre – philosopher

== Fictional figures ==
- Scrooge McDuck – fictional multi-billionaire cartoon duck
- Desmond Hume – fictional character in the TV series Lost.

== Military ==
- William Anderson – recipient of the Victoria Cross
- Andrew Bogle – recipient of the Victoria Cross
- Robert Downie – recipient of the Victoria Cross
- Francis Farquharson – recipient of the Victoria Cross
- Herbert Henderson – recipient of the Victoria Cross
- John Knox – recipient of the Victoria Cross
- Donald MacKintosh – recipient of the Victoria Cross
- Henry May – recipient of the Victoria Cross
- John McAulay – recipient of the Victoria Cross
- John McDermond – recipient of the Victoria Cross
- Hugh McInnes – recipient of the Victoria Cross
- James Miller – recipient of the Victoria Cross
- John Moore – British military officer
- James Park – recipient of the Victoria Cross
- Harry Ranken – recipient of the Victoria Cross
- William Reid – recipient of the Victoria Cross
- Walter Ritchie – recipient of the Victoria Cross
- George Rodgers – recipient of the Victoria Cross
- John Skinner – recipient of the Victoria Cross
- James Stokes – recipient of the Victoria Cross
- James Turnbull – recipient of the Victoria Cross
- William Young – recipient of the Victoria Cross

== Politics ==
- Bashir Ahmad – first Asian MSP
- Mhairi Black – youngest Member of Parliament (MP) elected to the House of Commons of the United Kingdom since at the Reform Act 1832
- Menzies Campbell – Leader of the Liberal Democrats (2006–2007)
- Henry Campbell-Bannerman – Prime Minister of the United Kingdom
- Roseanna Cunningham – Scottish National Party MP, MSP
- Donald Dewar – Secretary of State for Scotland, First Minister
- Pearse Doherty – Sinn Féin politician
- Winnie Ewing – Scottish National Party MP, MEP and MSP
- Margaret Ferrier – Scottish National Party MP
- George Galloway – MP for Glasgow Hillhead (1987–97) and Glasgow Kelvin (1997–2005)
- Nigel Griffiths – Labour Member of Parliament for Edinburgh South
- Arthur Henderson – Chairman of the Labour Party
- Bonar Law – Prime Minister of the United Kingdom
- John MacCormick – Scottish National Party
- John A. Macdonald – first Prime Minister of Canada
- John Maclean – Socialist
- Michael Martin – Speaker of the House of Commons
- James Maxton – Independent Labour Party MP
- Tommy Sheridan – Scottish Socialist Party MSP
- Manny Shinwell – Labour MP
- Nicola Sturgeon – Scottish First Minister and leader of the Scottish National Party (2014–2023)
- Gordon Wilson - MP for Dundee East (1974-1987) and leader of the Scottish National Party (1979-1990)
- Humza Yousaf – Scottish First Minister and leader of the Scottish National Party

== Religion ==
- Sohaib Saeed – Islamic scholar, academic and chaplain

== Sports ==
=== Athletics ===
- Angela Bridgeman – sprinter

=== Baseball ===
- Mac MacArthur – Major League Baseball player
- Jim McCormick – baseball player
- Bobby Thomson – baseball player

=== Boxing ===
- Scott Harrison – boxer
- Benny Lynch – boxer
- Jim Watt – boxer

=== Cricket ===
- James Stewart Carrick (1855–1923) – first-class cricketer
- William Foster (born 1934) – first-class cricketer
- David Livingstone (1927–2011) – international cricketer for Scotland

=== Cycling ===
- Philippa York – cyclist

=== Football ===
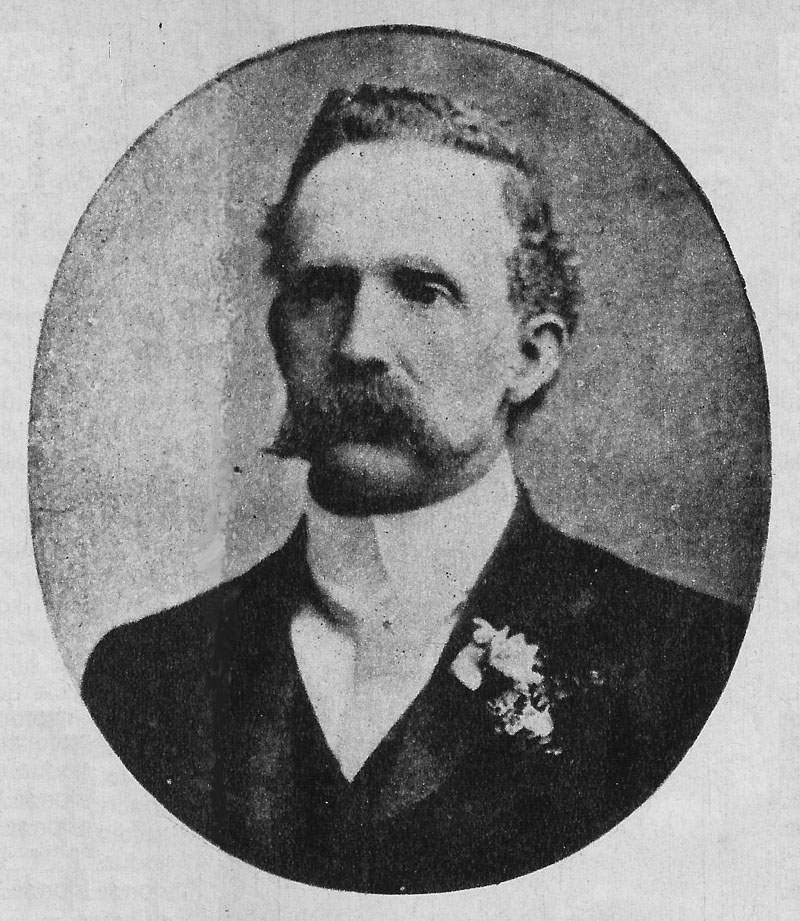
Alexander Watson Hutton

- Eddie Austin – forward
- Jen Beattie – defender
- Ralph Black – defender
- Tom Boyd – defender
- Jim Craig – defender and manager
- Graeme Churchill – striker
- Paddy Crerand – midfielder, manager, and sports commentator
- Kenny Dalglish – forward and manager
- Tommy Docherty – midfielder and manager
- Alex Ferguson – forward and manager
- Alexander Watson Hutton – teacher and founder of the Argentine Football Association
- Mo Johnston – forward
- Ruesha Littlejohn – forward and midfielder
- Ross McCormack – striker
- James McFadden – forward
- Frank McGarvey – forward
- Danny McGrain – defender and manager
- Jimmy McGrory – forward and manager
- Andrew Robertson – defender
- Peter Sermanni – midfielder
- Robert Snodgrass – midfielder and forward
- Jock Stein – defender and manager
- David Templeton – forward
- John Wark – midfielder

=== Golf ===
- Ewen Ferguson – professional golfer
- Kylie Henry – professional golfer
- Martin Laird – professional golfer
- Colin Montgomerie – professional golfer
- Janice Moodie – professional golfer
- Edith Orr – amateur golfer

=== Ice hockey ===
- Andy Aitkenhead – ice hockey player
- Gordie Clark – ice hockey player
- James Foster – ice hockey player
- Alex Gray – ice hockey player
- Frank Jardine – ice hockey player
- Colin Shields – ice hockey player
- Steve Smith – ice hockey player

=== Rugby union ===
- Adam Ashe – rugby union player and coach
- Johnnie Beattie – rugby union player
- Magnus Bradbury – rugby union player
- Alan Bulloch – rugby union player
- Gordon Bulloch – rugby union player
- Thomas Chalmers – rugby union player
- Rory Hughes – rugby union player
- James Malcolm – rugby union player
- Duncan Weir – rugby union player
- Jon Welsh – rugby union player

=== Snooker ===
- Marcus Campbell – professional snooker player
- Stephen Maguire – professional snooker player
- Anthony McGill – professional snooker player
- Alan McManus – professional snooker player

=== Swimming ===
- Michael Jamieson – swimmer
- Duncan Scott – swimmer

=== Tennis ===
- Andy Murray – Olympic tennis player
- Jamie Murray, professional tennis player

=== Wrestling ===
- Nikki Cross – professional wrestler
- Joe Coffey – professional wrestler
- Mark Coffey – professional wrestler
- Wolfgang – professional wrestler
- Isla Dawn – professional wrestler

== Science and engineering ==
- June Almeida – virologist
- Joseph Black – physicist and chemist
- Phillip Clancey – ornithologist
- Thomas Hopkirk – botanist
- Ronald David Laing – psychiatrist
- Elizabeth Janet MacGregor – medical doctor
- David Napier – marine engineer
- Robert Napier – marine engineer, co-founder of Cunard Line
- James Beaumont Neilson – inventor
- William Ramsay – chemist
- Kathleen Rutherford – doctor, philanthropist, humanitarian aid worker, peace campaigner, born in Glasgow.
- William Thomson, Lord Kelvin – mathematician, mathematical physicist and engineer
- James Watt – engineer
- Nora Wattie – public health pioneer
- John Scott Russell – naval engineer
- Charles Macintosh – inventor
- William Wright Virtue – engineer
