= Magic Garden =

Magic Garden or The Magic Garden may refer to:

== Gardens ==
- The Magic Garden, another name for Secret Buddha Garden on Ko Samui, Thailand
- "The Magic Garden (mosaic)", Isaiah Zagar's largest mosaic in Philadelphia
  - Philadelphia's Magic Gardens the related project

== Film and television ==
- The Magic Garden, a 1908 silent trick film produced by Robert W. Paul
- The Magic Garden (1927 film), a 1927 film
- The Magic Garden (1951 film), a 1951 film
- The Magic Garden (Russian: Чудесный сад, romanized: Chudesnyy sad), a 1962 animated short film
- The Magic Garden (TV series), an American children's program, on air from 1972 to 1984
- "Magic Garden", an episode of Lola & Virginia
- "The Magic Garden", an episode of Curious George
- "The Magic Garden", an episode of T-Bag

== Literature ==
=== Fiction ===
- The Magic Garden, a 1925 book in the My Book House series by Olive Beaupre Miller
- The Magic Garden, a 1927 novel by Gene Stratton-Porter

=== Non-fiction ===
- Magic Gardens, a 1944 book by Corinne Heline
- The Magic Garden, a 1983 book by Shirley Conran
- Magic Gardens: The Memoirs of Viva Las Vegas, a 2009 memoir by Liv Osthus

== Other uses ==
- The Magic Garden, a 1967 album by The 5th Dimension
- Magic Garden, a game by Enix Japan
