= Sermanni =

Sermanni is a surname. Notable people with the surname include:

- Peter Sermanni (born 1971), Scottish footballer
- Rachel Sermanni (born 1991), Scottish folk musician
- Tom Sermanni (born 1954), Scottish football manager and player
