= David Livingstone (disambiguation) =

David Livingstone (1813–1873) was a Scottish explorer of Africa and Congregationalist pioneer medical missionary.

David Livingstone may also refer to:

- David Livingstone (film), a 1936 British historical adventure film
- David Livingstone (cricketer) (1927–2011), Scottish cricketer
- David N. Livingstone (born 1953), British historian
- David Livingstone (broadcaster), broadcaster for Sky Sports in the UK
- David Livingstone, producer of the 2014 film Pride

== See also ==
- David Livingston, American television producer and director
- David Livingston (politician), member of the Arizona House of Representatives
- David Livingston (tennis) (born 1962), American former tennis player
- David M. Livingston, American oncologist
- David Livingstone Centre, a biographical museum in Blantyre, South Lanarkshire, Scotland
- David Livingstone Elementary School
- David Livingstone Primary
