= BEW =

BEW or Bew may refer to:

== Places by code ==
- Beira Airport, Mozambique (IATA: BEW)
- Berwick railway station, Melbourne, Victoria, Australia (BEW)
- Berwickshire, historic county of Scotland (Chapman: BEW)

== Other uses ==
- Bew (surname)—lists people named Bew or Bews
- Betawi language, spoken in Indonesia (ISO 639-3: bew)
- Bew (mathematical logic), a mathematical provability formula introduced by Kurt Gödel
- Ballistic eyewear, goggles to protect against small projectiles
- Board of Economic Warfare, a 1940s US federal agency
- Burma Economic Watch, an academic journal
