= Bews =

Bews is a surname, and may refer to:

- Andrew Bews (born 1964), Australian rules footballer with Brisbane Bears
- David Bews (1850–1891), South Australian politician
- Jed Bews (born 1993), Australian rules footballer with Geelong
- Jock Bews (1921–2015), Scottish amateur wrestler
- John Bews (1884–1938), South African botanist
- Mary Ellen Bews (1856–1945), New Zealand school principal

== See also ==
- Bew (surname)
