= Philadelphia shooting =

Philadelphia shooting may refer to:

- 2000 Lex Street massacre
- 2016 shooting of Jesse Hartnett
- 2022 Philadelphia shooting
- 2023 Kingsessing shooting
