= Urie (name) =

Urie is a surname of Scottish origin, and a given name. The surname is derived from Urie in Kincardineshire, Scotland. Notable people with the name include:

== Surname ==
- Axel Urie (born 1999), French footballer
- Brendon Urie (born 1987), American musician
- David Urie, American aerospace engineer
- Doug Urie (born 1976), American country musician of South 65
- Joseph Urie (born 1947), Scottish artist
- Michael Urie (born 1980), American actor
- Nicholas Urie (born 1985), American composer
- Robert Urie (1854–1937), Scottish locomotive engineer
- Steve Urie, American politician
- Tom Urie (born 1969), Scottish actor and musician

== Given name ==
- Urie Bronfenbrenner (1917–2005), Russian-born American psychologist
- Urie McCleary (1905–1980), American art director
