= Painted Bride Art Center =

Arts center in Philadelphia, Pennsylvania, United States

Coordinates: 39°57′21″N 75°08′38″W

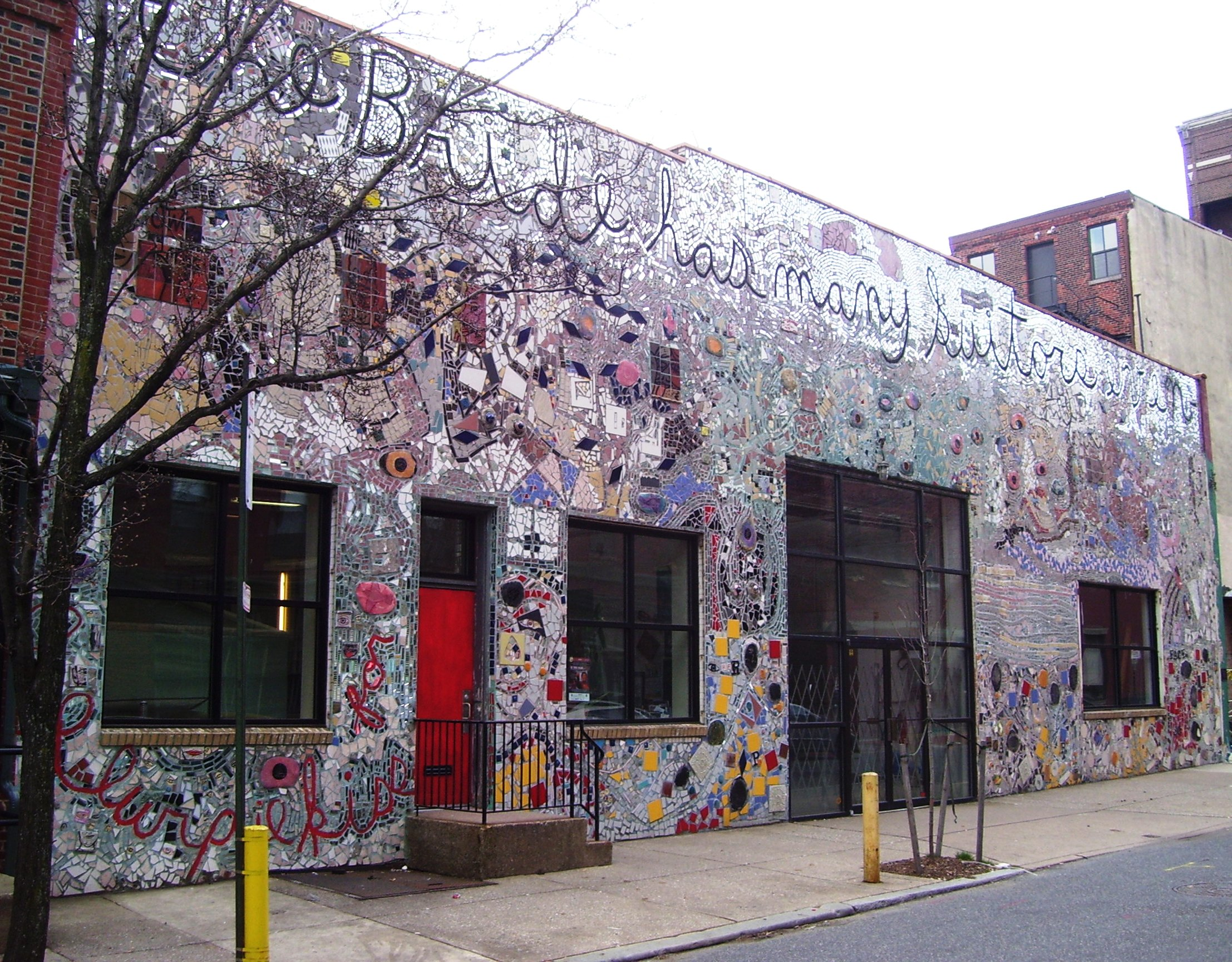
The front of the Painted Bride Art Center, showing Skin of the Bride, a mosaic by Philadelphia artist Isaiah Zagar which covers the entire building; the text along the top says "The Bride has many suitors, even", a reference to Marcel Duchamp's The Bride Stripped Bare By Her Bachelors, Even

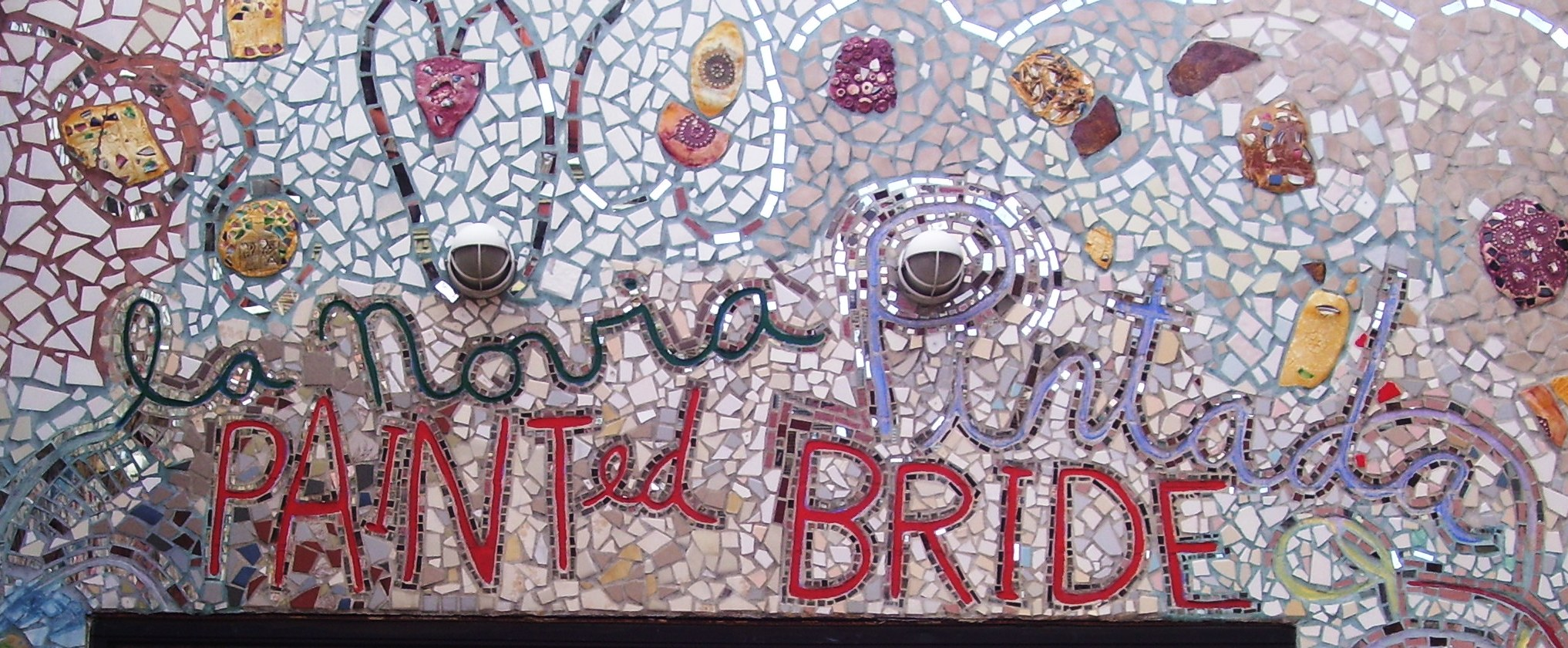
Detail of the mosaic over the main entrance

The Painted Bride Art Center, sometimes referred to informally as The Bride, is a non-profit artist-centered performance space and gallery particularly oriented to presenting the work of local Philadelphia artists, which presents dance, jazz, world, folk and electronic music, visual arts, theatre and performance art, poetry and spoken word performances. The Bride is part of the National Performance Network and is located at 5212 Market Street in the West Philadelphia neighborhood of Philadelphia, Pennsylvania.

The Painted Bride was founded as a gallery space in an old bridal shop on South Street in 1969 by Gerry Givnish, Sylvia and Larry Konigsberg, Frank Vavricka, A. John Kammer, and Deryl Mackie. Its name derives from a mannequin placed in the shop's window, which became an attraction as people came by to see what provocative outfit it was wearing, or what lewd position it was placed in. In 1973, the gallery gave rise to the Painted Bride Quarterly, a poetry and literary journal. In 1977, having received funding from the Comprehensive Employment and Training Act (CETA), the Bride hired its first paid staff. The six employees worked in all aspects of management. In 1982 it moved to its current location.

The Bride, which is part of the National Performance Network includes a 225-seat performance space – the Gerry Givnish Theatre – and has several galleries in which to mount visual arts shows. The New York Times referred to the center as a "wonderful, welcoming and often edgy" venue which "set the trend of cultural activity in Old City" when it was founded.

The center receives funding from numerous sources. In 1982, the Bride held a parade down Third Street from South Street to its new location in Old City, a building on Bread Street. In 1984, it was the only Philadelphia arts institution to be awarded a $100,000 challenge grant by the National Endowment for the Arts, but by 1996, with Federal grants to the arts diminishing, it received only $10,000, which was $20,000 less than had been budgeted for that performance year. The center also receives funding from the City of Philadelphia and the Pew Charitable Trust.

In 1985, the Bride was invited to a meeting that would launch the National Performance Network (NPN). A group of 14 artist centered organizations from across the country gathered to discuss the geographic isolation, the economic challenges of touring work outside of local communities, and how artists could engage with communities. In the late 80's and early 90's, the Bride was one of the only organizations in Philadelphia to present the work of independent artists.

The Bride hosted the first national festival on AIDS, Our Living Legacy, and a citywide festival. In 1987, the Bride hosted a project called “VOICES OF DISSENT,” an “alternative” celebration of the 200th anniversary of the Constitution. The project incorporated contributions from artists and arts organizations from around the city who were dubbed, “progressive cultural organizers.” As the project's organizer, Mat Schwarzman, wrote: “Cultural activists must develop new strategies for utilizing their work to build bridges between oppressed communities, between struggles in the past and struggles in the present, and between the actions of individuals and the actions of their society. We must work to literally reimage America into a society that can believe in its ability to change.”

The outside of the former industrial building The Bride is located in is completely covered by Skin of the Bride, a mosaic by Philadelphia artist Isaiah Zagar, which he created between 1991 and 2000 and donated to the center. Changes in the economic environment gradually eroded the Bride's ability to maintain programming at the levels offered up to the late 1990s. The recession took its toll on private donations, and foundation support became harder to come by as philanthropic priorities shifted away from general operating support. In 1999, Gerry Givnish, founder of the Bride retired. After a national search, the Bride's board of directors appointed former program director Laurel Raczka as executive director.

The outside of the former industrial building on 230 Vine Street where The Bride was located for 40 years is completely covered by Skin of the Bride, a mosaic mural by Philadelphia artist Isaiah Zagar, which he created between 1991 and 2000 and donated to the center. The mural became a point of contention when the Bride decided to sell the building in 2017. The Painted Bride board of directors was looking to sell the building and move on, the neighbors wanted to maintain the zoning code to preserve the area and Friends of Zagar and Philadelphia's Magic Gardens wanted to preserve the mural. This led to a lengthy legal battle. Since 2018, a number of offers were made by developers, a theatre company, and area businesses. Some of the offers included the mural, others destroyed it. Then architect and developer Shimi Zakin of Atrium Design Group offered to buy the building and build a 74-unit apartment that would sit on top of the current building, preserving the mural. In 2022, the Painted Bride organization sold the building to Atrium Design Group.

The building at 230 Vine Street was demolished in December 2025.

Today, Bride is a international art institution that remains rooted in its mission and the needs of Philadelphia's creative communities.

== See also ==
- Old City, Philadelphia
