= Erik Messerschmidt =

American cinematographer (born 1980)

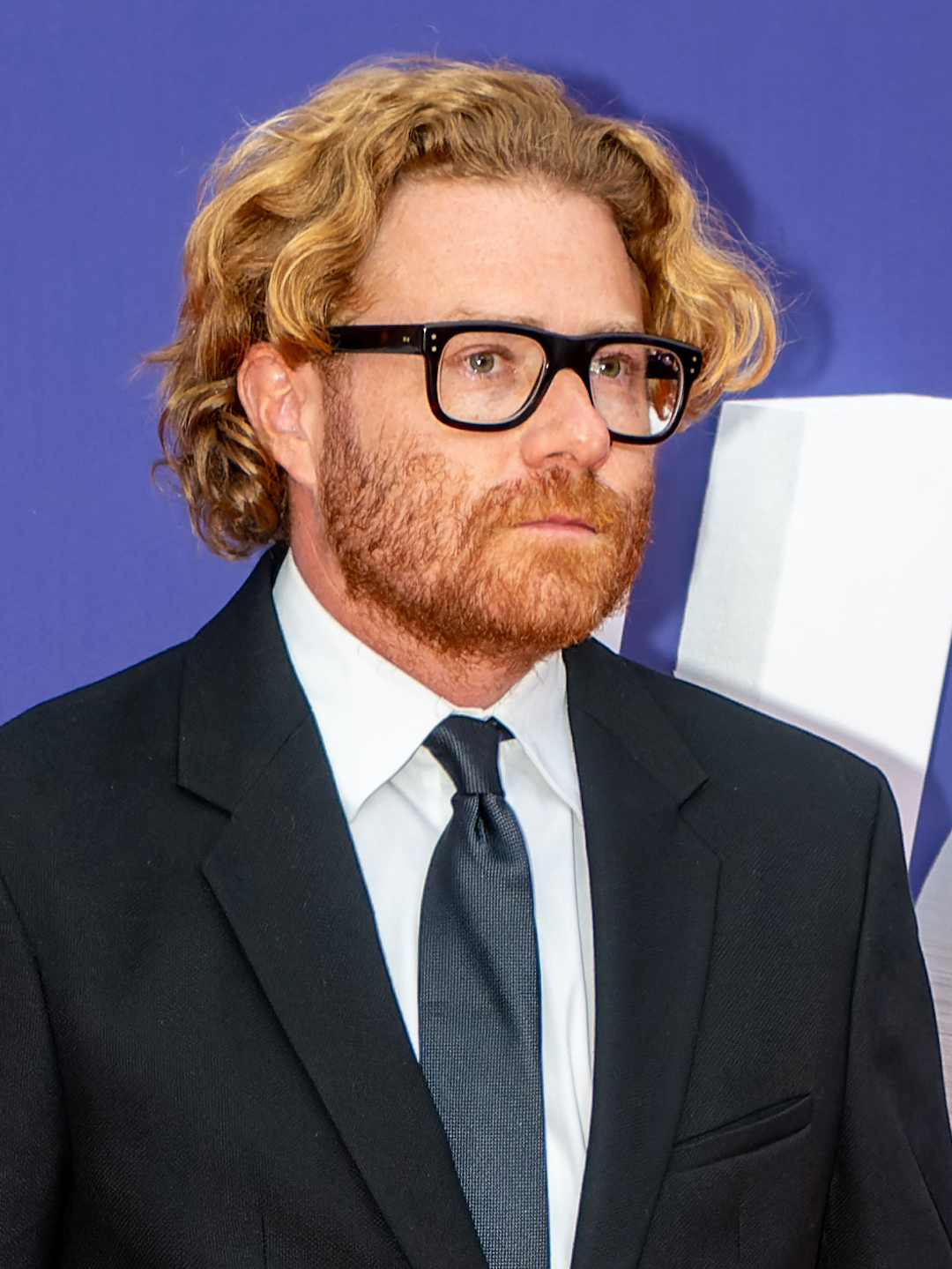
- Messerschmidt in 2023
- Born: October 23, 1980 (age 46); Portland, Maine, U.S.
- Education: Emerson College
- Occupation: Cinematographer
- Years active: 2001–present
- Organization: American Society of Cinematographers
- Spouse: Naiara Eizaguirre-Paulos (m. 2020)
- Children: 1
- Website: Official website

Erik Messerschmidt, ASC (born October 23, 1980) is an American cinematographer.

He is best known for his collaborations with director David Fincher, winning the Academy Award for Best Cinematography for his work on Mank (2020), which also served as his feature film debut.

== Early life and education ==
Messerschmidt was born in Portland, Maine, and grew up in Cape Elizabeth.

He studied film production at Emerson College in Boston, where he was a classmate of filmmaker Jeremiah Zagar and served as co-director of photography on Zagar's award-winning indie documentary In a Dream (2008).

== Career ==
After relocating to Los Angeles, Messerschmidt served as a gaffer on TV series like Bones, Everybody Hates Chris, and Mad Men. He also gained experience as a director of photography while shooting commercials, short films, and documentaries.

Messerschmidt had a working relationship with cinematographer Jeff Cronenweth, who recommended him to David Fincher. Fincher hired him as a gaffer on Gone Girl and, later, as director of photography for most episodes of Mindhunter.

With Mindhunter, Messerschmidt explained that the color palette, "has a desaturated green-yellow look... [it] helps give the show its period feel". He stated the effect is achieved through production design, costumes and filming locations—not necessarily through lighting used on set.

In 2024, he shot an advertisement for the virtual reality game Batman: Arkham Shadow.

== Personal life ==
In May 2020, Messerschmidt married Spanish journalist Naiara Eizaguirre-Paulos.

In January 2025, his home in Altadena, California was destroyed by the Eaton Fire. He was in Spain with Eizaguirre-Paulos and their newborn daughter at the time.

== Filmography ==
=== Film ===
Year	Title	Director	Notes
2008	In a Dream	Jeremiah Zagar	Documentary, with Mark Stetz
2020	Mank	David Fincher	1st film collaboration with Fincher
2022	Devotion	J. D. Dillard	
2023	The Killer	David Fincher	
2023	Ferrari	Michael Mann	
2025	Bono: Stories of Surrender	Andrew Dominik	Documentary
2026	The Dog Stars	Ridley Scott	
2026	The Further Mis-Adventures of Cliff Booth	David Fincher	With Jeff Cronenweth
2028	The Batman: Part II †	Matt Reeves	Filming

=== Television ===
Year	Title	Director	Episode(s)
2017–2019	Mindhunter	David Fincher; Andrew Douglas; Asif Kapadia; Tobias Lindholm; Carl Franklin; Andrew Dominik	16 episodes
2018–2019	Legion	Noah Hawley; Dana Gonzales; John Cameron	"Chapter 17"; "Chapter 18"; "Chapter 27"
2020	Fargo	Dana Gonzales	"Storia Americana"
2020	Raised by Wolves	Sergio Mimica-Gezzan; James Hawes	"Infected Memory"; "Lost Paradise"; "Umbilical"
2025	Dope Thief	Ridley Scott	"Jolly Ranchers"

== Awards and nominations ==
Year	Award	Category	Title	Result	Ref.
2008	Camerimage	Golden Frog	In a Dream (Shared with Mark Stetz)	Nominated	
2020	Academy Awards	Best Cinematography	Mank	Won	
2020	American Society of Cinematographers	Outstanding Achievement in Cinematography	Mank	Won	
2020	Satellite Awards	Best Cinematography	Mank	Won	
2020	BAFTA Awards	Best Cinematography	Mank	Nominated	
2020	Chicago Film Critics Association	Best Cinematography	Mank	Nominated	
2020	Critics' Choice Movie Awards	Best Cinematography	Mank	Nominated	
2020	Florida Film Critics Circle	Best Cinematography	Mank	Won	
2020	Primetime Emmy Awards	Outstanding Cinematography	Mindhunter (For "Episode 6")	Nominated	
2023	Camerimage	Golden Frog	Ferrari	Nominated	
2023	Satellite Awards	Best Cinematography	Ferrari	Nominated	
2025	Primetime Emmy Awards	Outstanding Technical Direction and Camerawork for a Special	Bono: Stories of Surrender	Nominated	
