= James McAlpin =

American businessman and merchant (1761–1847)

- Born: August 6, 1761; Glasgow, Scotland
- Died: July 20, 1847 (aged 85)
- Occupation: Merchant
- Known for: Tailor to George Washington
- Board member of: Franklin Institute, Saint Andrew's Society, Lehigh Coal and Navigation Company
- Spouse: Ann (d. 1821)
- Children: Alexander

James McAlpin (August 6, 1761 – July 20, 1847) was a Philadelphia businessman and merchant who served as George Washington's tailor during his presidency and in his later life.

== Early life and family ==
McAlpin was born on August 6, 1761, in Glasgow, Scotland, the seventh of nine children, and emigrated to British America with his family prior to the American Revolution. He moved to Philadelphia by the 1780s.

== Career ==
McAlpin and his wife Ann lived at 3 South Fourth Street in the district of Southwark, Philadelphia, in an area now known as Fabric Row. They had one son.

He began serving as President Washington's personal tailor beginning in the 1790s. City directories list McAlpin as a merchant tailor until approximately 1817, and from 1818 onward he is listed as a gentleman.

McAplin had various business and philanthropic interests in Philadelphia. He was a founding board member of the Franklin Institute in the 1820s, also serving on the committee overseeing the construction of the building. McAlpin was a trustee of the Lehigh Coal and Navigation Company, established in February 1822. He was also a longtime member of the Saint Andrew's Society of Philadelphia (including serving as president from 1831 to 1838).

== Death and legacy ==
McAlpin died on July 20, 1847, aged 85. He is buried at Laurel Hill Cemetery. His estate was settled in April 1849.

His business and personal correspondence with Washington is well-documented in the Papers of George Washington and the George Washington Presidential Library.

Personal affects belonging to McAplin and his family are in the permanent collection of the Winterthur Museum, Garden and Library.
