= Philadelphia's Magic Gardens =

Folk art environment in Pennsylvania, United States

Coordinates: 39.942831°N 75.159324°W

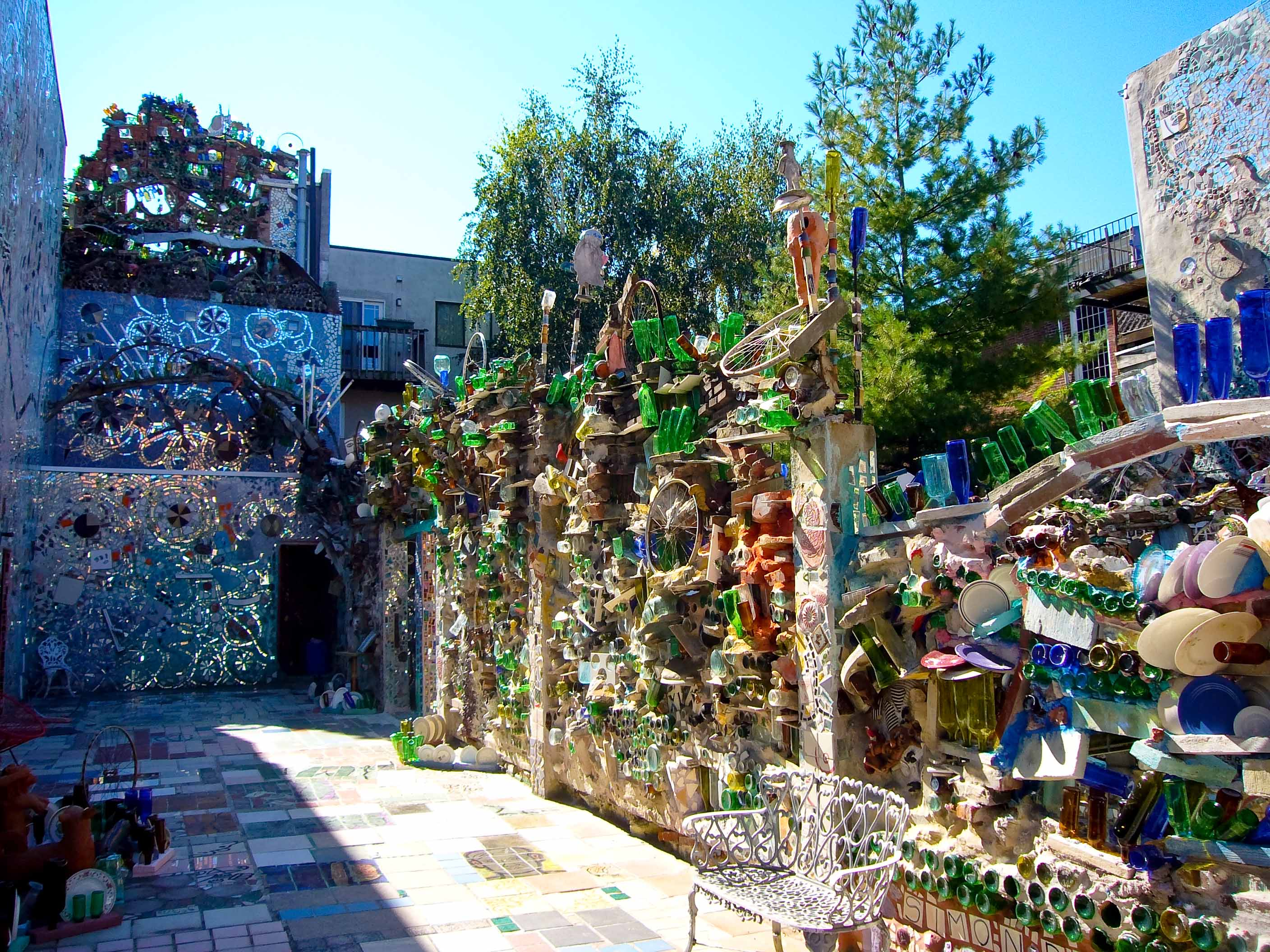
- Courtyard in the Magic Gardens in October 2008
- Location: 1020 South St; Philadelphia, Pennsylvania 19147, U.S.
- Founder: Isaiah Zagar
- Website: www.phillymagicgardens.org

Philadelphia's Magic Gardens is a non-profit organization, folk art environment, and gallery space on South Street in Philadelphia, Pennsylvania. It is the largest work created by mosaic artist Isaiah Zagar. The Magic Gardens spans three city lots, and includes indoor galleries and a large outdoor labyrinth. The mosaics are made up of everything from kitchen tiles and mirror shards to bike wheels, Latin-American art, and china plates. The space is open for public view, from 11:00-6:00 Wednesday through Monday and closed on Tuesdays.

== History ==
Isaiah and his wife Julia moved to South Street in 1968, when the area was being slated for demolition by the city in order to create the Crosstown Expressway (I-695), which would have linked I-76 and I-95. Due to this proposed construction, the area was desolate and dangerous. The Zagars were some of the first people to come to this area and begin to turn its image around. They opened the Eye’s Gallery at 402 South Street, which was the first property that Isaiah would mosaic. The gallery still showcases and sells the art of Latin-American artists.

After the Eyes Gallery, the Zagars went on to purchase and rent out several other buildings, and Isaiah would go on to create several other mosaicked spaces and public murals. He bought the building that currently houses Philadelphia's Magic Gardens in 1994. He fenced off the two vacant lots next door in order to keep out garbage and vermin, and over the next fourteen years began creating the Magic Gardens. In 2002, the landowner of the two vacant lots wanted to sell the land due to rising property values on South Street. Together with members of the community, Isaiah was able to purchase the lots. With this purchase, "Philadelphia's Magic Gardens" was born, and in 2008 it opened to the public, dedicated to inspiring creativity and community engagement.

Much of the work in the garden was influenced by and includes objects from Zagar's international travels, including but not limited to Latin America, India, Morocco, Iran, China, and Indonesia. Specific art exhibits around the world, such as The Ideal Palace, in France, Watts Towers in Los Angeles, The Rock Garden in India, and Las Pozas in Mexico, were also heavy influences that one sees in the Garden.

=== Present day ===
Philadelphia's Magic Gardens is a total of 3,000 square feet (280 m^{2}) of mosaicked space. The interior gallery space hosts artists from all over the world and exhibits artwork that has ties to the organization's mission in some way - whether ceramics, mosaics, or "outsider" art. Philadelphia's Magic Gardens also has educational programming, performances, tours, and mosaic workshops, all of which are open to the public. Zagar continues to create mosaic murals on the streets of Philadelphia, hundreds of which can be seen in or around the South Street area.

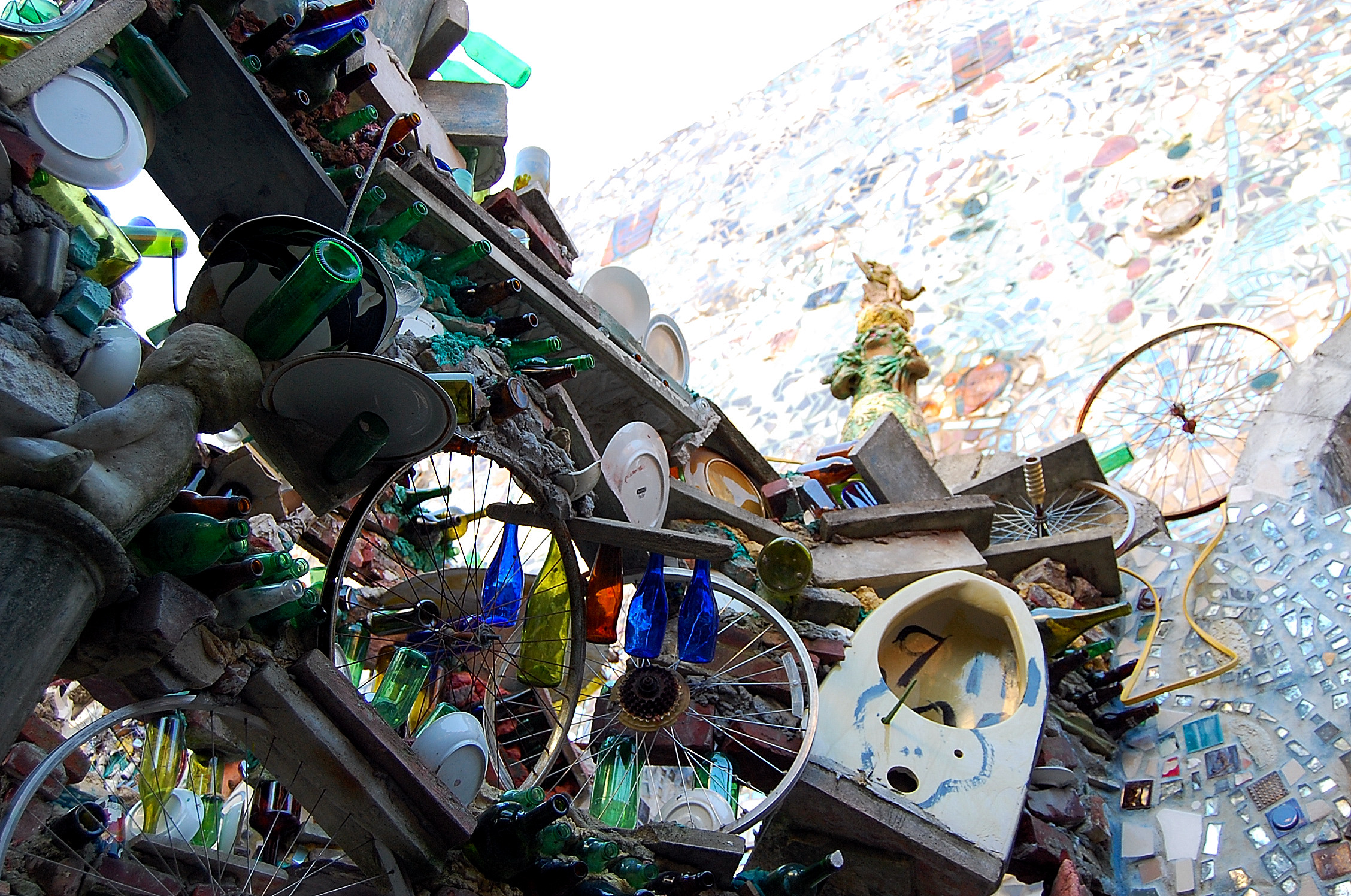
Detail of Philadelphia's Magic Gardens

== See also ==
- In a Dream, a documentary about Isaiah Zagar directed by his son
- List of public art in Philadelphia
