= Bew (surname) =

Bew is a surname, and may refer to:

- Danny Bew (1896–1951), English footballer
- George Kwok Bew (c.1868–1932), Chinese-Australian merchant and activist
- John Bew (bookseller) (1774–1793), bookseller and publisher in London
- John Bew (historian), British historian, son of Paul Bew
- Kieran Bew (born 1980), English actor
- Mark Bew (born 1967), English engineer
- Paul Bew (born 1950), British historian and peer

== See also ==
- Bews
