= Secret Buddha Garden =

Private sculpture park in Surat Thani Province, Thailand

Coordinates: 9.4828°N 99.9946°E

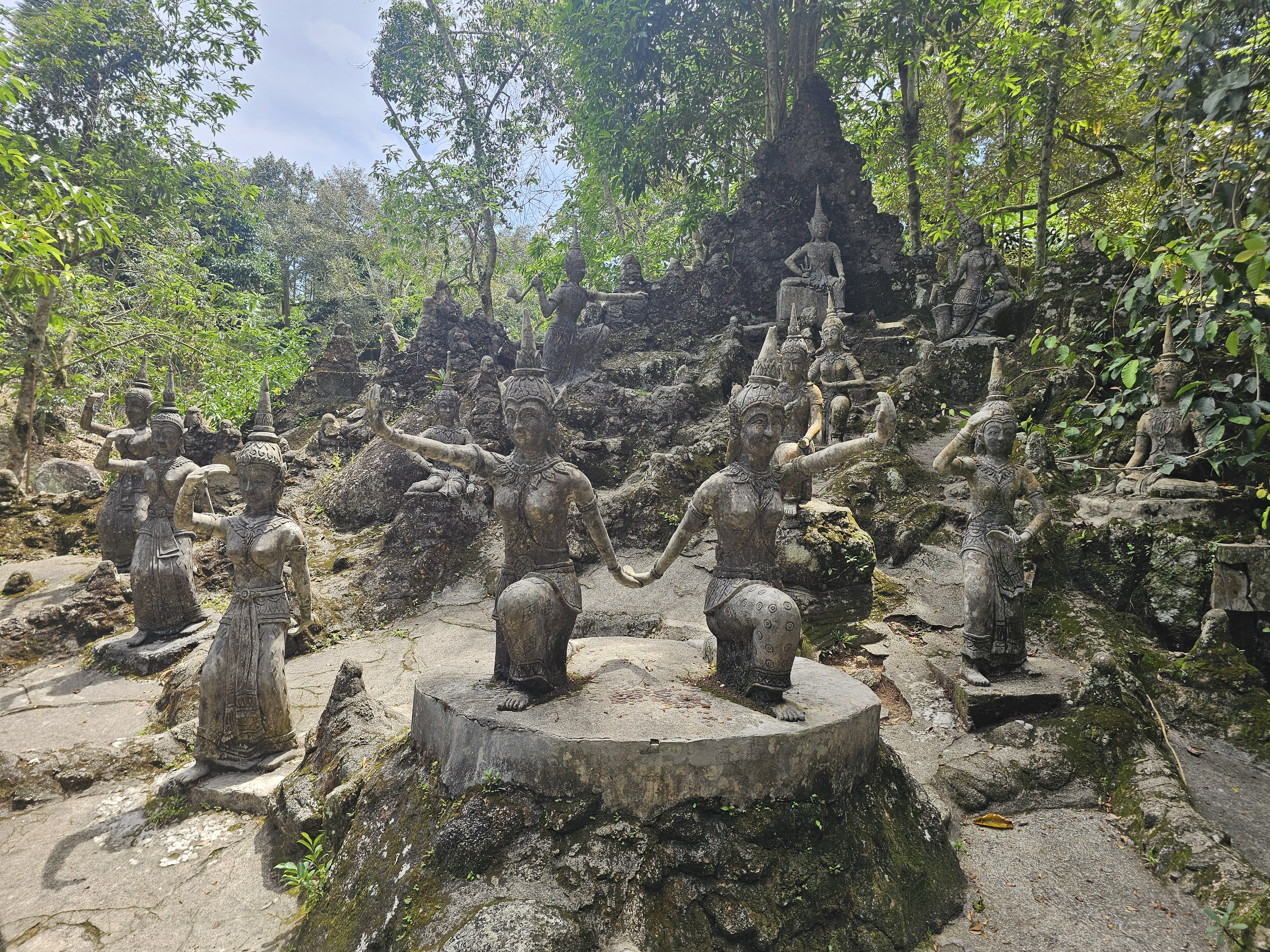
- Interactive map of Secret Buddha Garden
- Type: sculpture garden

Secret Buddha Garden, also known as Magic Garden and Heaven's Garden and Tarnim Magic Garden is a private sculpture park atop Pom Mountain (also called Khun Nim Peak), one of the highest peaks on the resort island of Ko Samui in Surat Thani Province, Thailand.

The site is not a wat (temple) but a private undertaking by a retired durian farmer Khun Nim Thongsuk who began building it in 1976, at the age of 77, and continued to do so until his death at the age of 91. The site features many statues of Buddha and other aspects of Thai Buddhism, and also of birds and snakes and other animals, and a pair of statues of the founder's parents and a statue depicting him and father holding hands. The main group of statues in the site is a number of angel statues, and a group of musicians. Khun Nim's tomb is also found on the site, up a short path from the angel statues. The site also features waterfalls within the Garden.

The site is a popular tourist attraction despite its remoteness and difficult final climb.

== Location and access ==
The road up to the trailhead leading to the Garden is on Route 4169 between Hua Thanon and Na Mueang, immediately opposite Wat Khunaram. The road is steep in spots and not suitable for novice motorcycle riders.
