= Tom Sermanni =

Scottish footballer (born 1954)

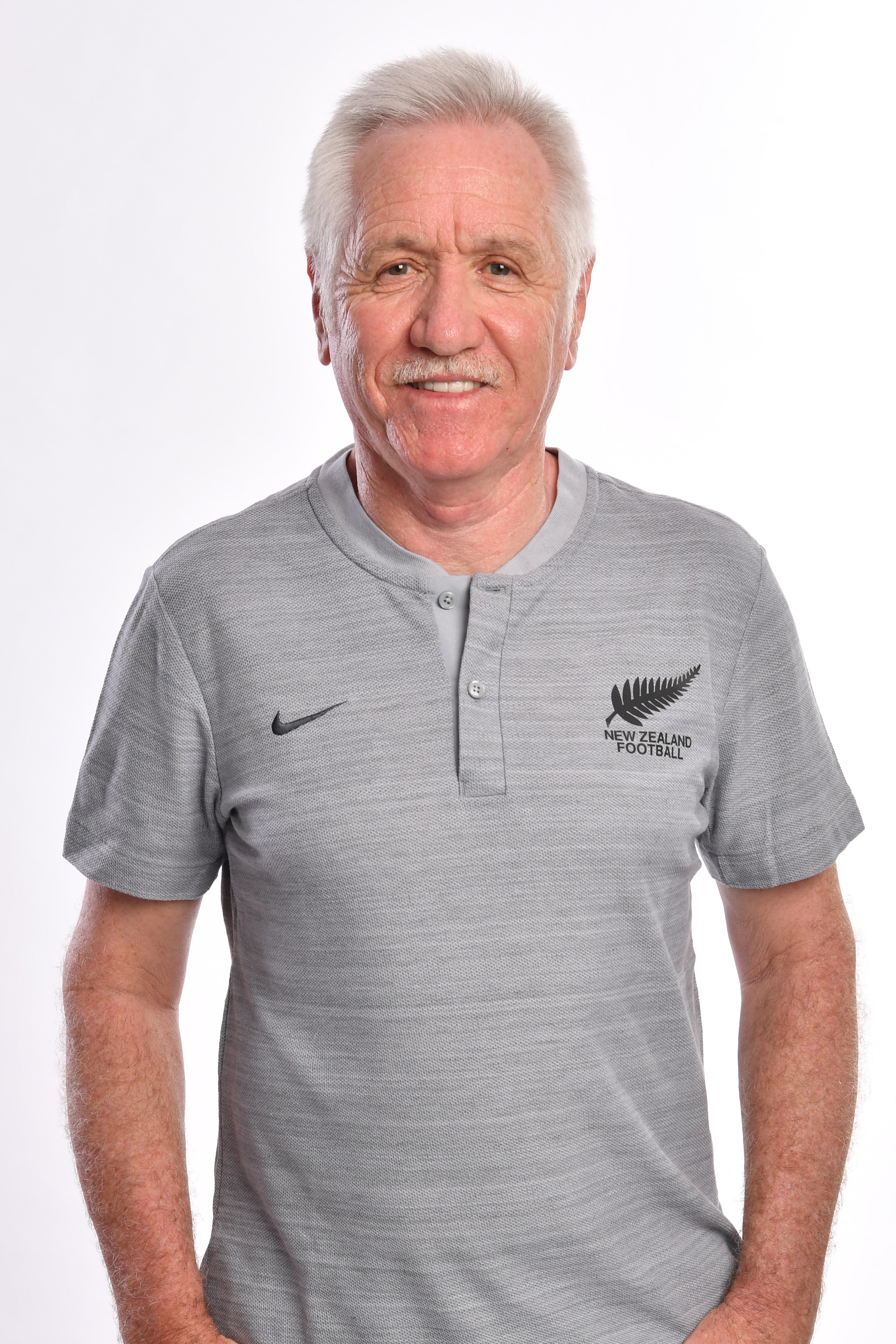
- Sermanni in 2019

Personal information
- Full name: Thomas Dorby Sermanni
- Date of birth: 1 July 1954 (age 72)
- Place of birth: Glasgow, Scotland
- Height: 5 ft 8 in (1.73 m)
- Position: Midfielder

Youth career
- 1971–1973: Cumbernauld United

Senior career*
Years	Team	Apps	(Gls)
1973–1978	Albion Rovers	151	(38)
1978–1979	Blackpool	10	(0)
1979–1982	Torquay United	89	(12)
1982–1983	Dunfermline Athletic	5	(0)
1983	Marconi	30	(3)
1984–1987	Canberra City	72	(7)
1988–1989	Canberra Croatia		
Total		357	(60)

Managerial career
- 1988–1991: Canberra Croatia/Metros (player-manager)
- 1989–1991: Australian Schoolboys
- 1991–1992: Australian Institute of Sport
- 1992: Westfields Sports High School
- 1993–1994: Sydney Olympic FC
- 1994–1997: Australia women
- 1997–1999: Sanfrecce Hiroshima (assistant)
- 1999–2001: Canberra Cosmos
- 2001–2002: San Jose CyberRays (assistant)
- 2003: New York Power
- 2003: Sarawak (director of coaching)
- 2004: Westfields Sports High School
- 2005–2008: Australia men (scout)
- 2005–2012: Australia women
- 2013–2014: United States women
- 2014: Canada women (technical consultant)
- 2015: Canada women (assistant)
- 2016–2018: Orlando Pride
- 2018–2021: New Zealand women
- 2024–2025: Australia women (interim)
- * Club domestic league appearances and goals

Thomas Dorby Sermanni (born 1 July 1954) is a Scottish football manager and former professional player, who mostly works in women's football. He has previously managed the Australia women's national team across three stints (1994–1997, 2005–2012 and 2024–2025), the United States women's national team from 2013 to 2014, the Orlando Pride of the National Women's Soccer League from 2016 to 2018, and the New Zealand women's national team from 2018 to 2021. In 2014, he was inducted into the Football Australia Hall of Fame in recognition of his impact on the game in Australia and beyond.

== Playing career ==
Born in Glasgow, Sermanni played as a midfielder in Scotland, England, Australia and New Zealand for Cumbernauld United, Albion Rovers, Blackpool, Torquay United, Dunfermline Athletic, Canberra City and Christchurch United. His nephew Peter was also a footballer who later moved to Australia.

== Coaching career ==
=== Australian clubs ===
Sermanni has coached a number of Australian club sides, including Canberra Metros and Canberra Cosmos.

=== Women's United Soccer Association (WUSA), 2001–2003 ===
In 2001 Sermanni was an assistant coach for the Bay Area CyberRays of the Women's United Soccer Association (WUSA). The CyberRays won the league's inaugural championship, the Founders Cup. He remained an assistant coach in 2002 when the team changed its name to the San Jose CyberRays. In 2003, he was hired as head coach of the New York Power (WUSA), who had fired their previous coach after finishing their 2002 season with a dismal record of 3 wins, 17 losses, and 1 draw (10 pts). With Sermanni as their coach, the team improved to finish the 2003 season in fifth place with a record of 7 wins, 9 losses and 5 draws, or 26 points.

=== Australia women's national team ===
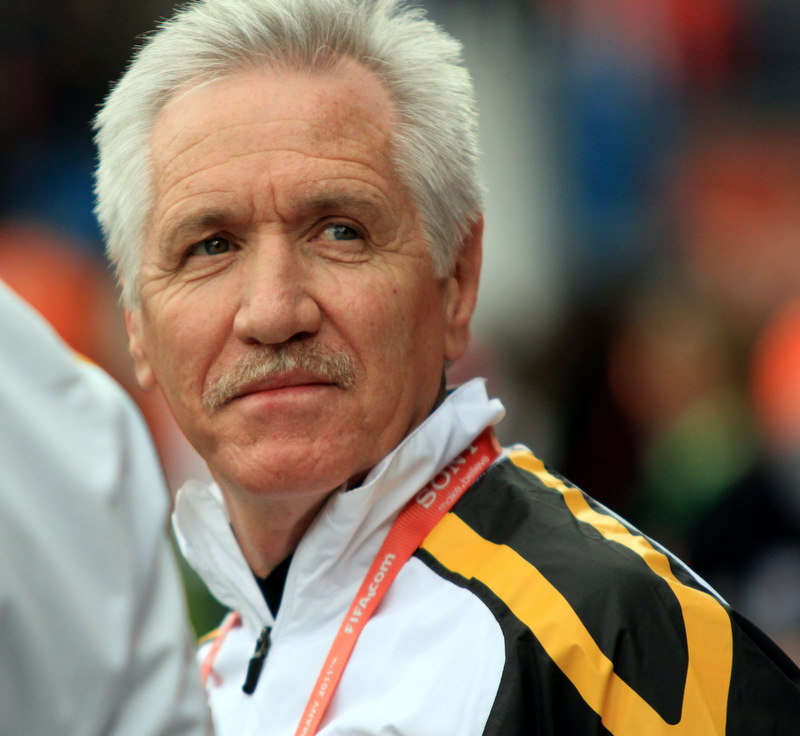
Sermanni in 2011

Sermanni became the first full-time national team coach of the Australia women in July 1994. With his appointment he oversaw the installation of six intensive training centres for women’s football across the country, each with full-time coaches. The 1994 OFC Women's Championship acted as the World Cup qualifiers for Oceania Football Confederation (OFC). Australia finished even with New Zealand on points but had a superior goal difference and qualified for their first FIFA Women's World Cup in 1995 in Sweden. After qualifying he employed a full coaching panel, including an assistant, team manager, physio and a doctor. During this tenure the team were nicknamed "The Matildas" from song "Waltzing Matilda". In November 1997 Sermanni left to join Sanfrecce Hiroshima as their assistant coach.

He returned for a second spell as coach of the Matildas in December 2004. Among his accomplishments as coach of the Matildas are quarter-finalists at the 2007 FIFA Women's World Cup and quarter-finalists at the 2011 FIFA Women's World Cup.

=== United States women's national team ===
On 30 October 2012, the United States Soccer Federation announced that starting 1 January 2013, Sermanni would be the head coach of the United States women's national team, ending his long-time association with Australia.

Sermanni finished his first year as manager of USA unbeaten with 13 wins and 3 draws, including winning the 2013 Algarve Cup.

At the 2014 Algarve Cup, the United States women did not win a game in group stage, and came seventh overall. This was the lowest the team had finished at the Algarve Cup, which the team had previously won nine times. This result put Sermanni's position under pressure, and on 6 April he was relieved of his coaching duties following a 2–0 'friendly' win over China.

=== Canada women's national team ===
In 2014 Sermanni joined the coaching staff of the Canada women's national team as a technical consultant. Sermanni was on contract as an assistant coach to Canada during 2015 FIFA Women's World Cup.

=== National Women's Soccer League ===
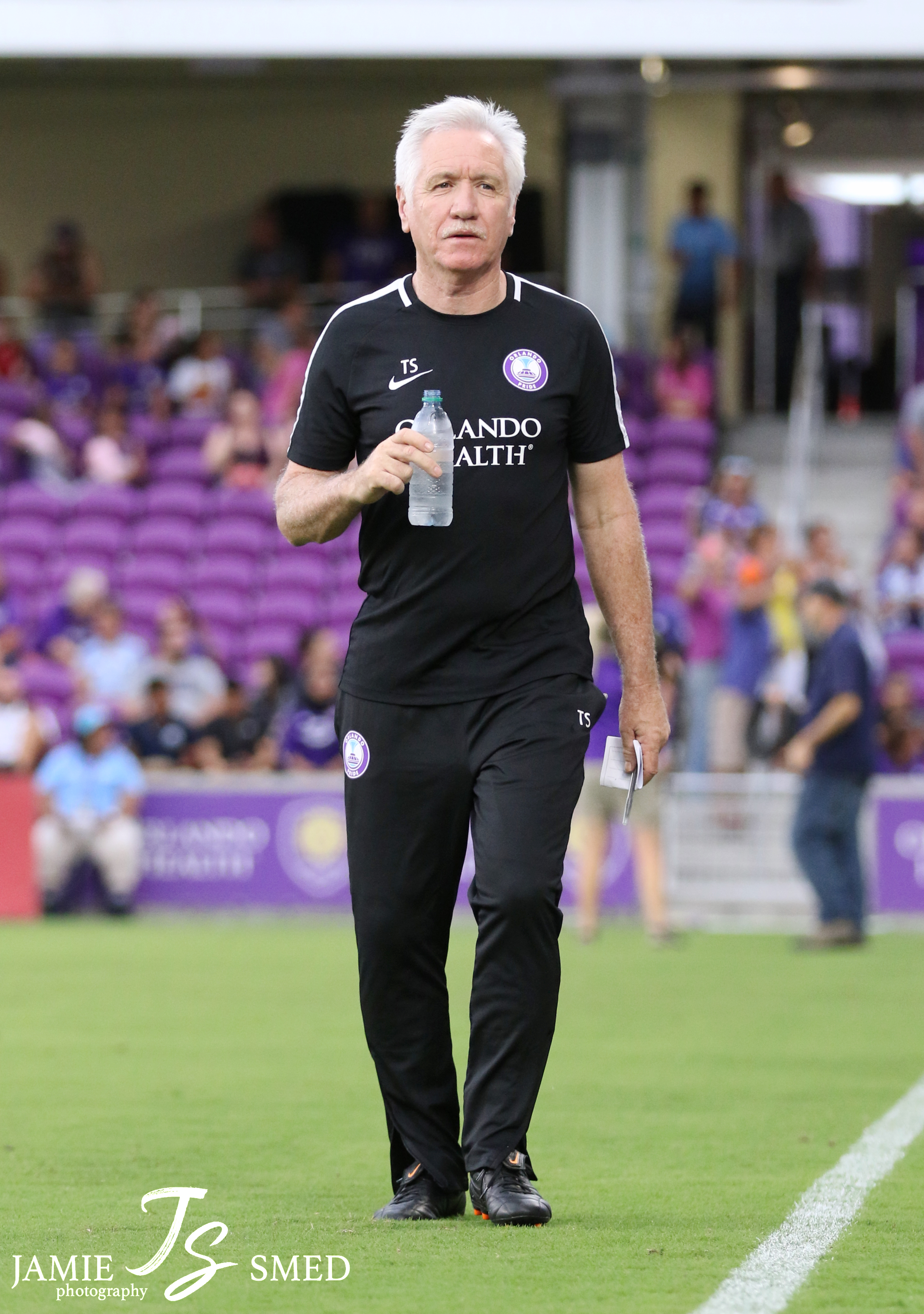
Sermanni with Orlando Pride in 2018

On 20 October 2015, Orlando City SC announced the creation of a women's team Orlando Pride to join National Women's Soccer League in 2016, and Sermanni would be the first coach for the expansion club. On 14 September 2018 after a disappointing 2018 season where the Orlando Pride finished in 7th place, Sermanni and the Orlando Pride mutually parted ways. Sermanni had a record of 24–29–14 in 3 seasons in Orlando and qualified for the playoffs in 2017.

=== New Zealand women's national team ===
On 26 October 2018, Sermanni was appointed the new head coach of New Zealand women's team. He was released after 2020 Summer Olympics.

=== Return to Australia ===
In March 2022, he was appointed as Head of Women's Football at Western Sydney Wanderers.

In September 2024, Sermanni was re-appointed as interim head coach of the Australia women's national team whilst Football Australia searches for a permanent replacement for outgoing coach Tony Gustavsson. In May 2025 Sermanni coached his 150th game with the Matildas in their 2–0 defeat of Argentina in a friendly in Melbourne.

On 2 June 2025, Football Australia announced the appointment of Joe Montemurro to succeed Sermanni as the permanent head coach of the Matildas.

== Managerial statistics ==
As of 6 June 2025

Team	Nat	From	To	Record				
Team	Nat	From	To	G	W	D	L	Win %
Australia women	(Australia)	1994	1997	32	13	3	16	40.63
Australia women	(Australia)	2005	2012	106	61	12	33	57.55
United States women	(United States)	2013	2014	24	18	4	2	75.00
New Zealand Women	(New Zealand)	2018	2021	24	10	0	14	41.67
Australia women	(Australia)	2024	2025	13	7	1	5	53.85
Total				199	109	20	70	54.77

== Honours ==
=== Manager ===
Australia

- OFC Women's Championship: 1994
- AFF Women's Championship: 2008
- AFC Women's Asian Cup: 2010

United States

- The Algarve Cup: 2013

New Zealand

- OFC Women's Nations Cup: 2018

=== Individual ===
- AFC Coach of the Year: 2007
- ACT Sport Hall of Fame: 2012 (Associate Member)
