= South Street (Philadelphia) =

Neighborhood in Philadelphia, US

South Street Headhouse District
- Neighborhood of Philadelphia
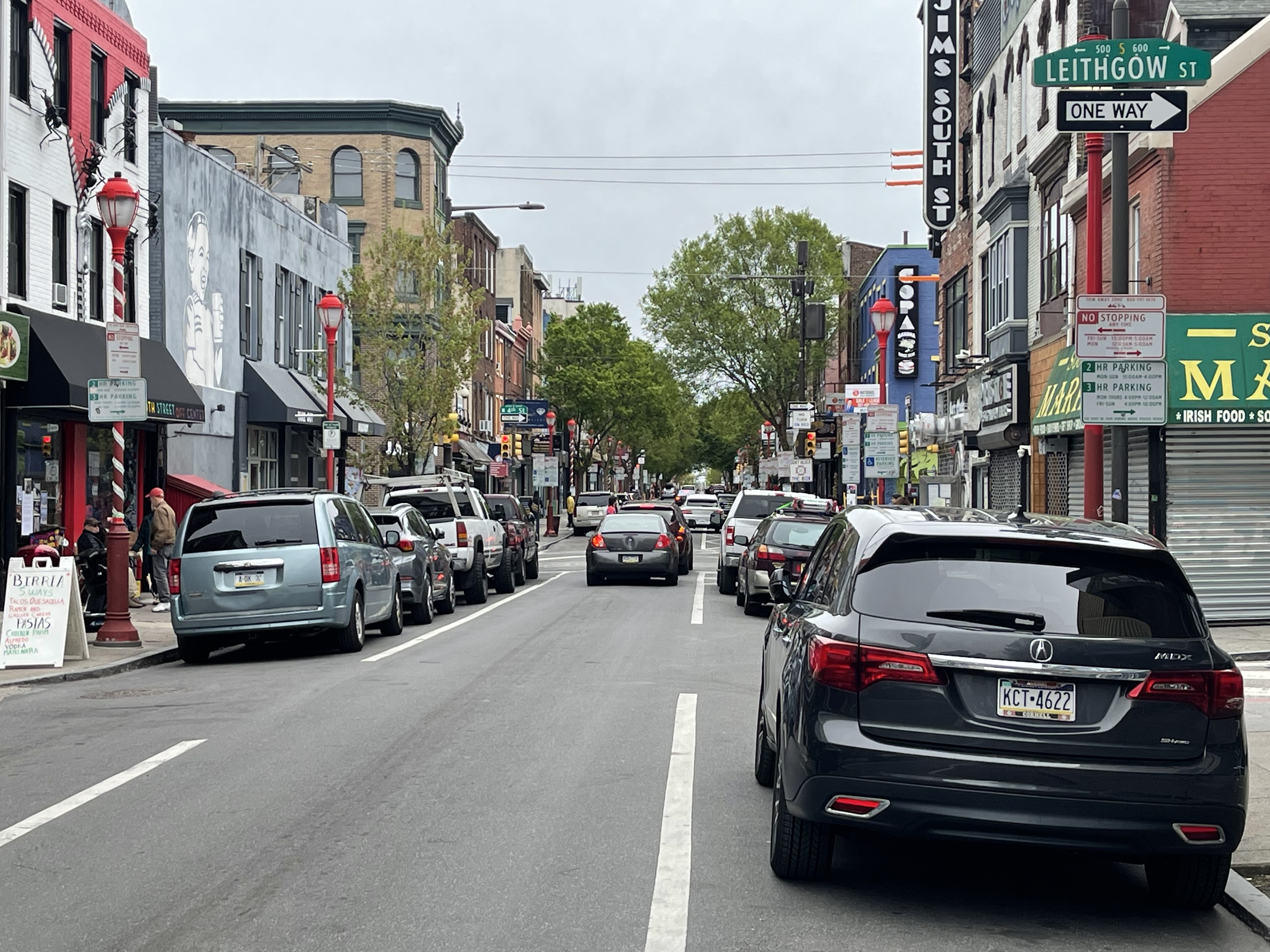
- The 400 block of South Street near the corner of Leithgow in South Philadelphia

- Location within Philadelphia
- Coordinates: 39.941758°N 75.15069°W
- Country: United States
- State: Pennsylvania
- County: Philadelphia
- City: Philadelphia

Area
  - Total: 0.047 sq mi (0.12 km^{2})

Population (2014)
  - Total: 27,805
  - Density: 590,000/sq mi (230,000/km^{2})
- ZIP Code: 19145
- Area codes: 215, 267 and 445

South Street
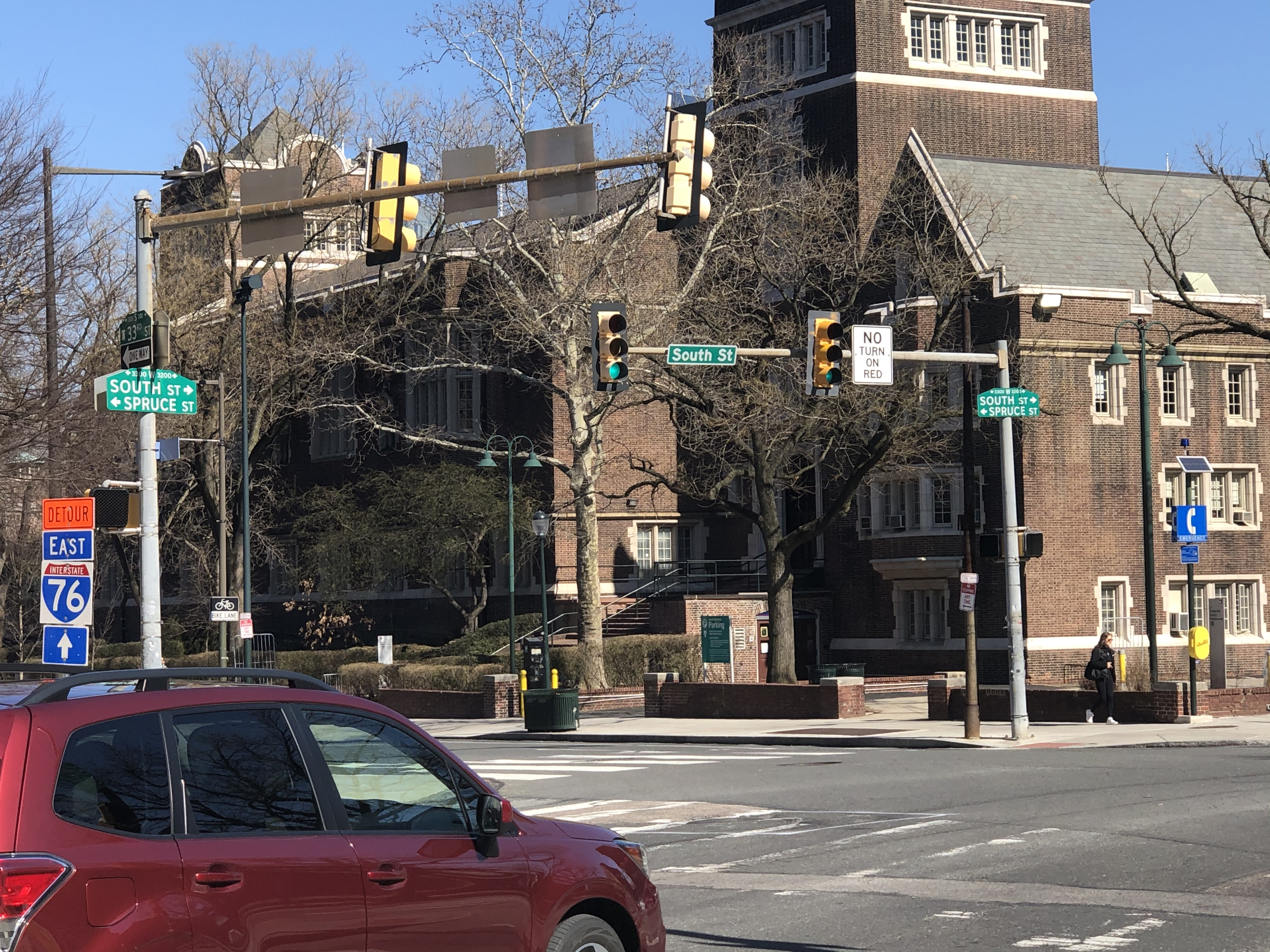
- South Street's western terminus in University City at Penn Medicine Station
- Interactive map of South Street
- Location: Philadelphia, Pennsylvania, U.S.
- West end: 33rd Street / Spruce Street in University City
- Major junctions: I-76 (Schuylkill Expressway) in University City; PA 611 (Broad Street) in Center City
- East end: Front Street in Center City

South Street in Philadelphia, initially named Cedar Street in William Penn's original street grid, is an east–west street forming the southern border of Center City and the northern border for South Philadelphia in Pennsylvania, United States.

The South Street Headhouse District between Front and 7th or 8th streets is a neighborhood known for its bohemian, punk, and alternative atmosphere and its diverse urban mix of shops, bars, and eateries. South Street is one of Philadelphia's largest and most prominent tourist attractions.

== History ==
=== 17th and 18th centuries ===
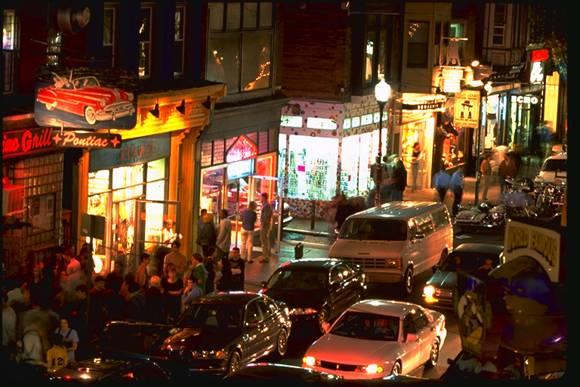
The 300 block of South Street at night from the corner of 3rd and South streets

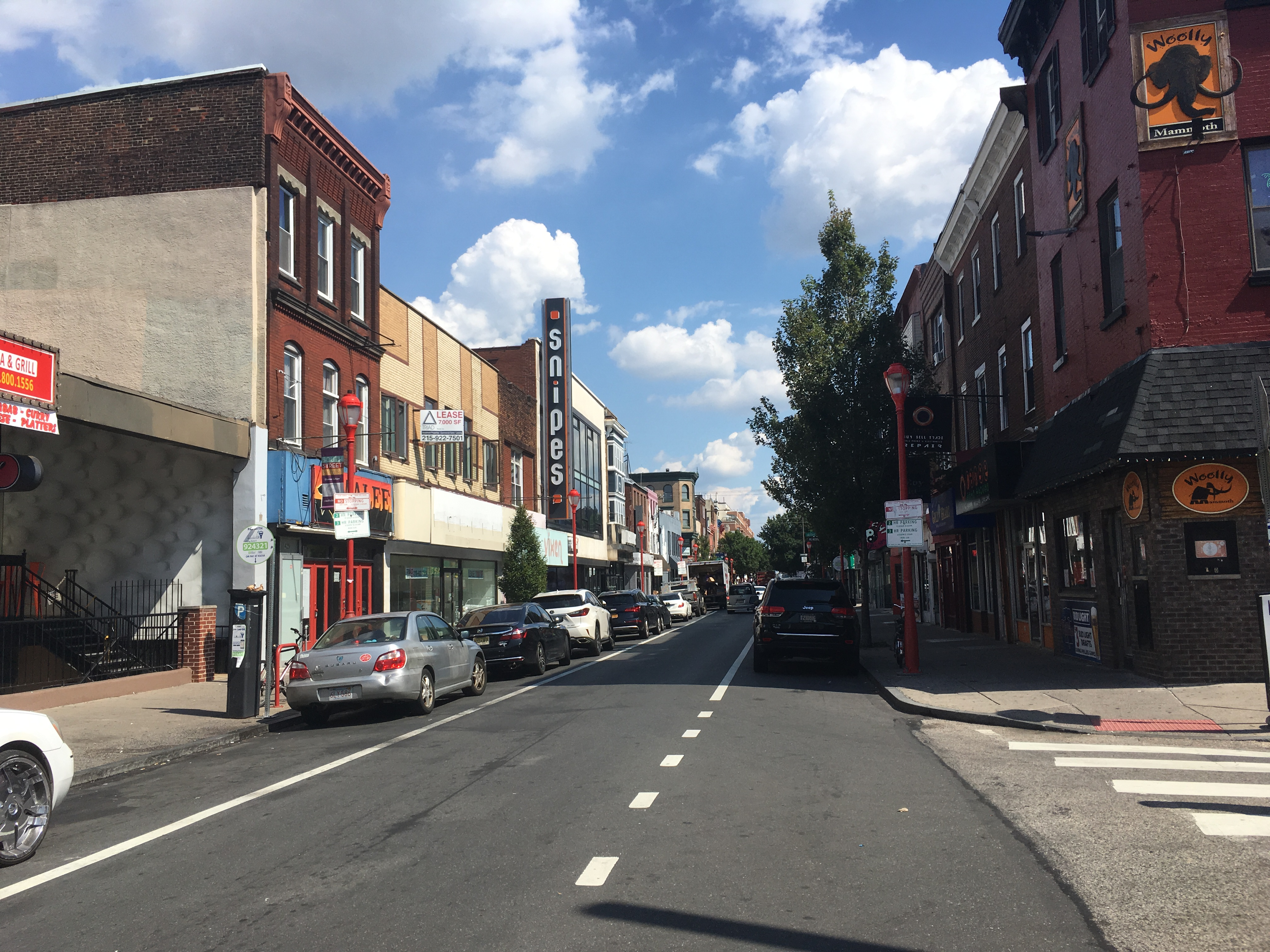
South Street eastbound past 5th Street

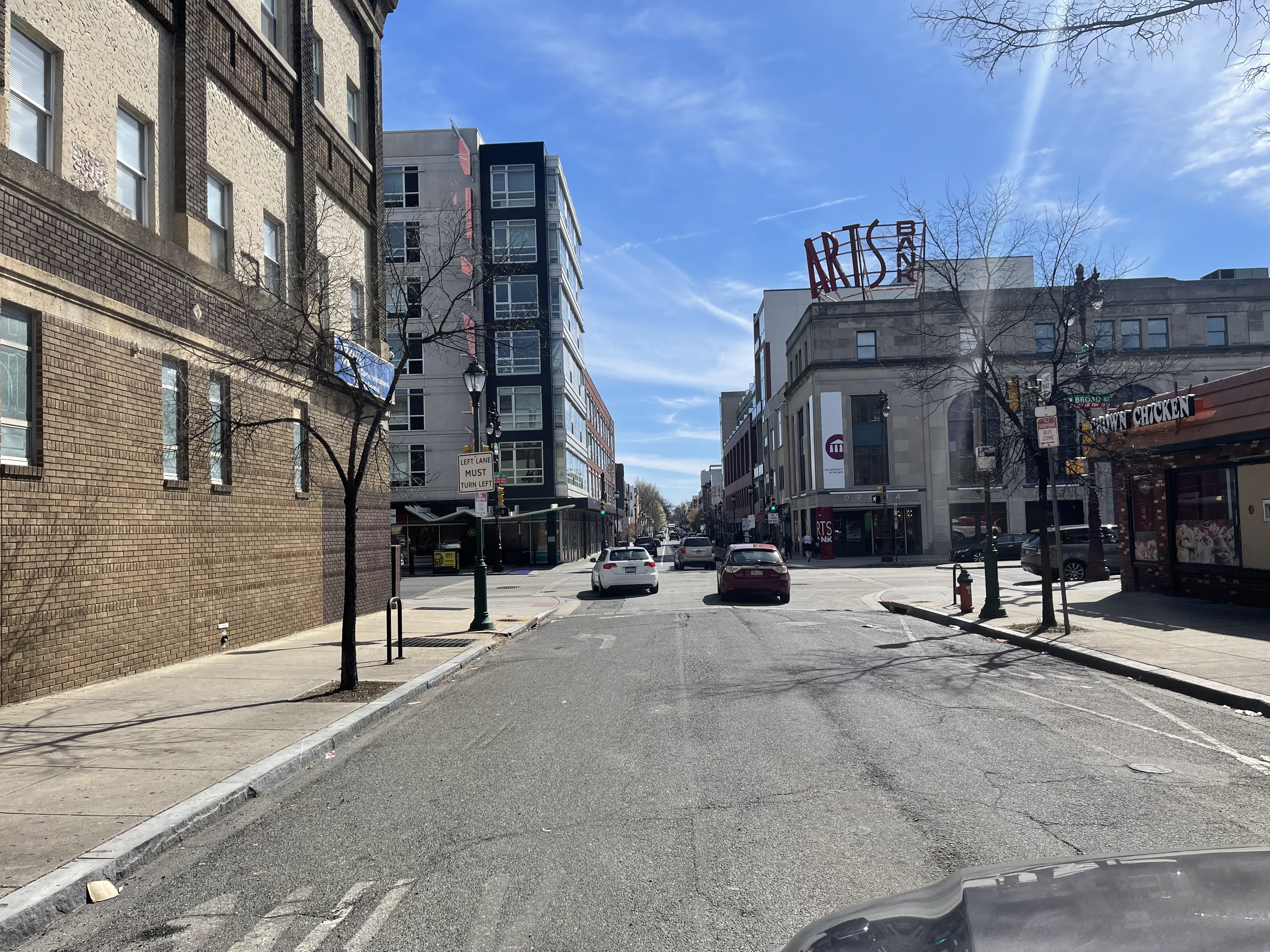
South and Broad in the Avenue of the Arts area

Originally the southern border of William Penn's 1682 city plan and officially named Cedar Street until 1854, eastern South Street had been originally the center of local Swedish and Dutch populations, then Irish in the early to mid 1800s, and, many decades later, Jewish and Italian immigrant culture as well as a vibrant African-American neighborhood.

Because Quaker doctrine opposed live performances within the city limits, the first permanent theater in the United States was built on the south side of the street at Leithgow Street, giving birth to a tradition of Philadelphians seeking out entertainment on South Street that continues today.

=== 19th century ===
In 1854, the same year that South Street officially became South Street, the city boundaries were redrawn to expand the area of Philadelphia to 130 square miles.

Despite no longer being a literal border, South Street remained a liminal space where cultures collided. The African American theater district of western South Street, the later Jewish and Italian immigrant shops and theaters on eastern South Street, the nearby Italian businesses in the Italian Market area, and the influx of visitors from other parts of the city looking for entertainment all combined to eventually create a place described by William Gardner Smith in his 1954 book South Street as a lively zone of contact between many different ethnicities.

=== 20th century ===
Until the 1950s, South Street was known mainly as a multiethnic entertainment and garment district, with an abundance of stores for men's suits and other clothing. The eastern end of South Street comprised part of the Jewish and Italian Fabric Row, while the more western areas around South Street served as a cultural and commercial center for South Philadelphia's African American community.

Real estate values plummeted after city planner Edmund Bacon and others proposed the Crosstown Expressway, a short limited-access expressway connecting the Schuylkill Expressway and I-95 that would have required the demolition of many buildings on South Street and Bainbridge Street (an east–west street one block south of South Street). The suddenly cheap property attracted artists and counterculture-types. The proposed expressway was never built due to public opposition.

By the late 1950s and early 1960s, and especially following the Crosstown Expressway proposal and the resulting drop in rent and property prices, South Street served as an artists' haven and a hub of Beat subculture and, later, 1960s counterculture, bohemianism, and the hippie movement in Philadelphia, establishing a lasting association of South Street with avant-garde and alternative subcultures.

Artist Isaiah Zagar has made South Street his home since the late 1960s and his mosaic work can be seen in multiple places along South Street including his large installation Philadelphia's Magic Gardens between 10th Street and 11th Street.

Starting mainly in the early 1960s to the 1970s, South Street was filled with clubs and bars that fostered a live local music community. It was not uncommon for South Philadelphians to "bar-hop" across the clubs, listening to live bands along the way. This community of fans helped attract recording contracts for many artists, including Kenn Kweder, the bard of South Street, George Thorogood, and Robert Hazard.

In 1976, the famous cheesesteak restaurant Jim's Steaks of West Philadelphia expanded to South Street, becoming the restaurant's first franchise. The restaurant has since split from the original franchise and is now separately owned and renamed as Jim's South Street. Starting in the late 1990s, the street saw the establishment of various chain stores. South Street is adjacent to Headhouse Square, a notable plaza with various shops and restaurants.

From the mid- to late-1970s into the 1980s, South Street's reputation as a musical, artistic, and countercultural hub was further solidified as it became the center of Philadelphia's punk scene and punk and alternative rock music communities, with venues such as JC Dobbs and stores such as Zipperhead catering to the burgeoning scene.

In the late 1980s, South Street became one of the city's main tourist attractions. Tourists flocked to the nightlife that South Street had accumulated over the years, and the "neighborhood" community aspect was gradually stripped from it. Many of the South Street clubs have closed, replaced by chain stores and shops to cater to tourists.

=== 21st century ===
The name South Street is popularly attached to an eight-block stretch of South extending after 8th Street and a few adjacent streets. It remains a popular hangout area for teens, college students, and twentysomethings with its assortment of bars, take-out eateries, sex shops, gift shops, and retailers catering to hip hop fashion, punk fashion, and/or urban culture.

A few restaurants and independent boutiques targeting a slightly more mature clientele are interspersed with these businesses, such as Accent on Animals, a pet supply store, and South Street Souvlaki, a Greek restaurant.

On June 4, 2022, three people were killed and eleven others were injured during the 2022 Philadelphia shooting.

== Layout ==
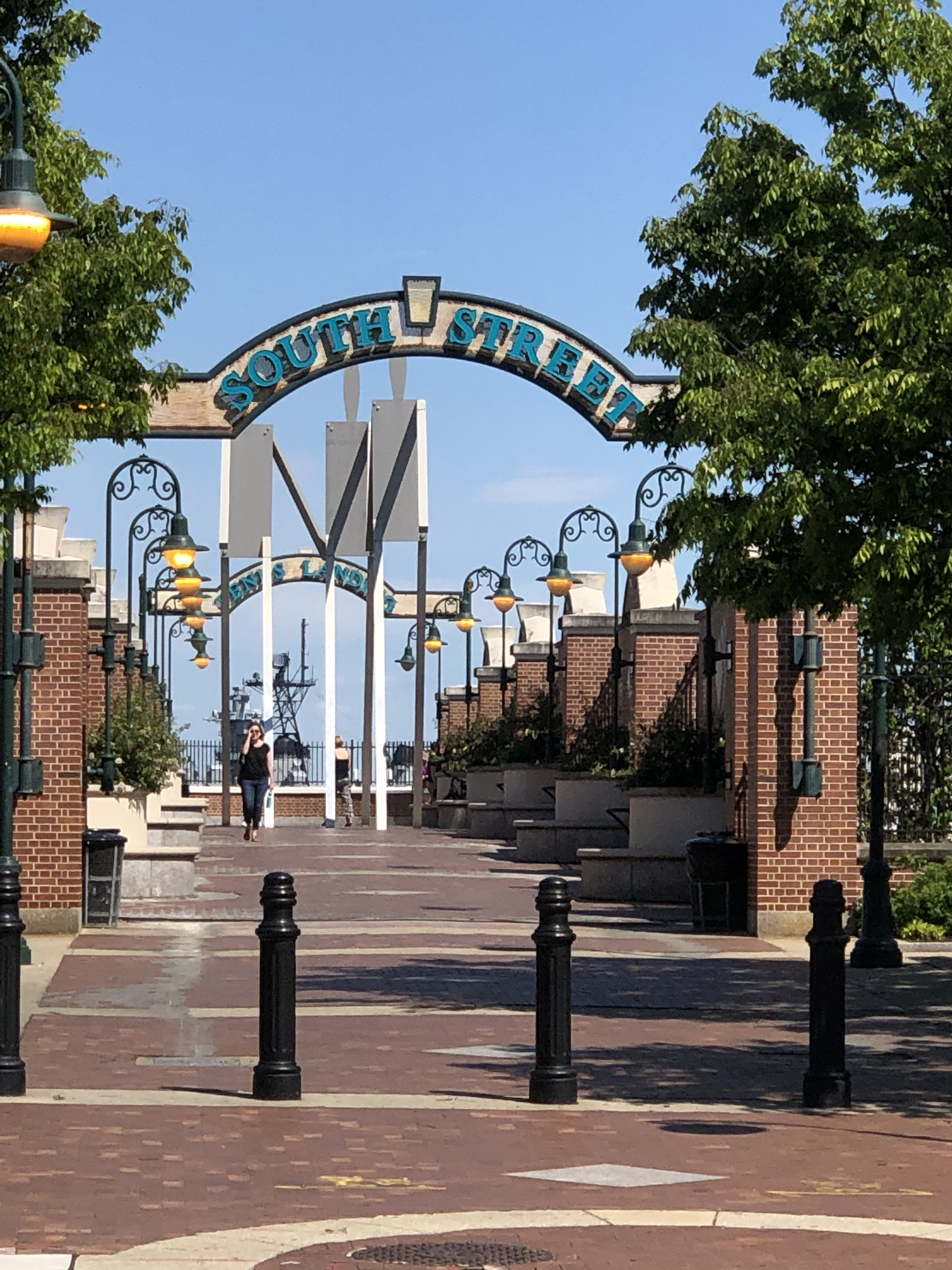
South Street's eastern terminus at Front Street near Penn's Landing, at the bridge crossing Interstate 95

From west to east, South Street traverses the following neighborhoods:

- University City (West Philadelphia)
- Schuylkill
- Grays Ferry
- Fitler Square
- Rittenhouse Square
- Avenue of the Arts
- South Street Headhouse District
- Queen Village

South Street begins at 33rd and Spruce Streets in University City, heading east-southeast past the University of Pennsylvania's Franklin Field and the University Museum. It crosses the Schuylkill River on the South Street Bridge, a fixed bridge built in 2010 to replace a former double bascule bridge dating from 1923. South Street then heads east (relative to the city grid), and becomes one-way eastbound from 27th Street all the way to Front Street.

South Street marks the 600 South block (from Market Street) in the city's gridiron street system. In West Philadelphia, the 600 South is delineated between 45th and 63rd Streets by Cedar Avenue, the name being a relic of the original name for South Street (Cedar Street) in the original plan for Philadelphia as drafted by William Penn. South Street and Cedar Avenue are discontinuous with each other due to Woodland Cemetery, the University of Pennsylvania (the former Blockley Township), and the Schuylkill River.

The historic district spans the following areas:

- South Street from Front to Broad. Some sources also say that the neighborhood has begun to expand west from here since 2014. Traditionally, the original neighborhood only existed from Front to 7th. The limit as of 2017 is 11th Street
- Pine Street at 2nd (Head House Square)
- Lombard Street between Front and 3rd
- Kater Street
- 4th Street down to Catherine Street (Fabric Row)
- Passyunk Avenue south to Fitzwater

The neighborhood significantly overlaps with Queen Village, Washington Square West, Bella Vista, and Society Hill.

== Demographics ==
In 2014, the area's population was 27,805. The average age for the neighborhood is 34.9, with 57.44% of the population between the ages of 18 and 44 and 62.3% of the population are renters with the average income of $71,856.

== Public transportation ==
South Street is traversed over its entire length by SEPTA's Route 40 bus, running eastbound on South and westbound on Lombard Street through Center City. During evenings and weekends, the 40 bus avoids the pedestrian congestion east of Broad Street by turning north on Broad and then turning east on Pine Street all the way to Front Street. Several other transit routes cross South Street, most important being the subsurface Broad Street Line with its station at Lombard-South.

== South Street in popular culture ==
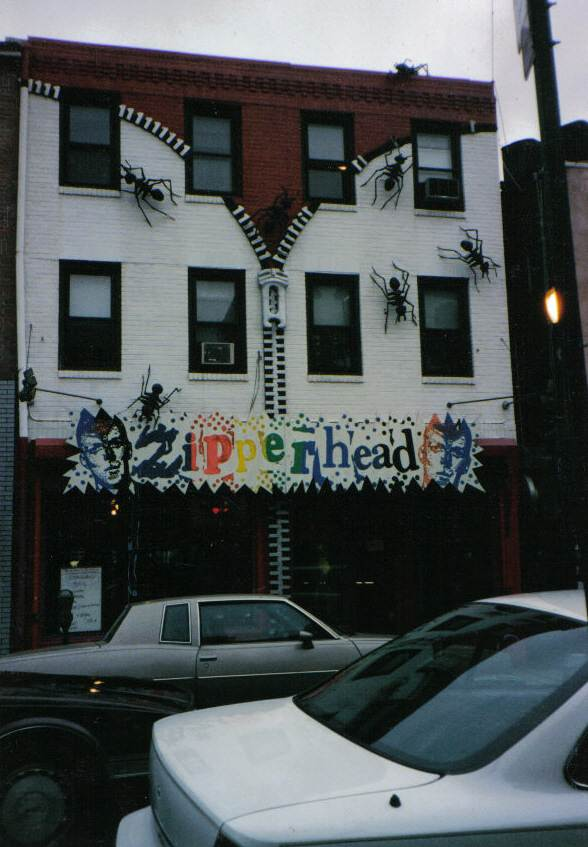
Zipperhead on South Street is mentioned in the 1988 song "Punk Rock Girl" by the Dead Milkmen.

- January 1963: The Orlons, a music group from Philadelphia, release their song "South Street", which opens with the lyric: "Where do all the hippies meet? South Street, South Street. Where the dancin' is elite, South Street, South Street...Hurry down, baby to the hippest street in town!" Another Philadelphia-area band, The Dovells also mentioned South Street in their 1963 hit "You Can't Sit Down".
- May 1982: Fear releases their song "I Don't Care About You", which name checks cities and neighborhoods associated with the punk rock movement in the United States in the early 1980s; the song opens with the lyric, "South Street Philadelphia. Out from Avenue C".
- December 1988: The Dead Milkmen release their song "Punk Rock Girl", which opens with a reference to Zipperhead, the South Street punk rock and alternative clothing and accessories store: "One Saturday I took a walk to Zipperhead. I met a girl there and she almost knocked me dead." The song later references the Philadelphia Pizza Company on South Street. Portions of the video for the song were also filmed on South Street.
- January 1989: HBO broadcasts its comedy special The Diceman Cometh, starring comedian Andrew Dice Clay, which was recorded at South Street's Theatre of Living Arts; Clay mentions South Street in his standup act.
- April 1991: Boyz II Men release their debut song and video "Motownphilly", which references South Street: "While cooling on South Street, Jet black Benz, plenty of friends, and all the Philly steaks you can eat." The "Motownphilly" video is also partially filmed on South Street.
- January 1993: Green Day made their Philadelphia debut at J.C. Dobbs on the 300 block of South Street. The band had not yet signed with Reprise and the club oversold the 125-capacity venue. Late arrivals paid to enter the second floor and watch the live video feed. During the third song of the set, a young woman had a seizure, the show was halted, and police ended the concert and cleared the venue.
- January 1998: Philadelphia native Will Smith releases his song "Gettin' Jiggy wit It", which includes the lyric: "Rock from South Street to One Two Fifth. Women used to tease me. Give it to me now, nice and easy."
- 2005 to 2012: The block of South Street between 5th and 6th streets is shown in the opening credits of the FX Network show It's Always Sunny in Philadelphia.
