= Isaiah Zagar =

American artist (1939–2026)

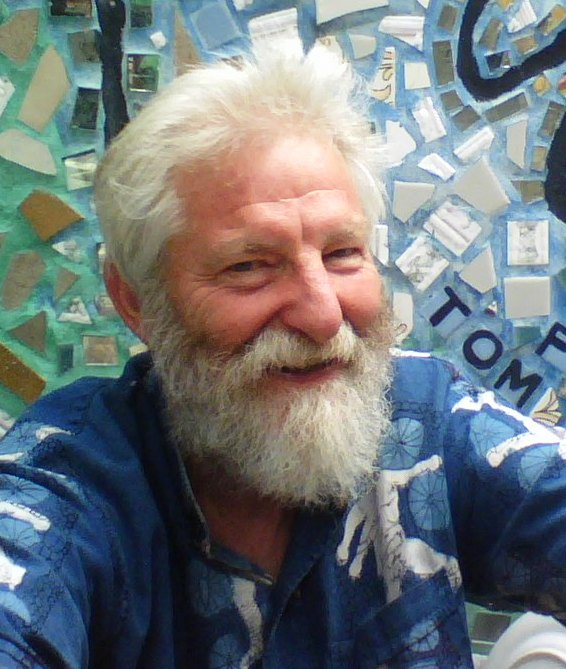
- Zagar in his Magic Gardens (2007)
- Born: March 18, 1939; Philadelphia, Pennsylvania, U.S.
- Died: February 19, 2026 (aged 86); Philadelphia, Pennsylvania, U.S.
- Education: Pratt Institute (BA)
- Known for: Sculpture, ceramics, mosaic
- Notable work: Philadelphia's Magic Gardens

Isaiah Zagar (March 18, 1939 – February 19, 2026) was an American mosaic artist based in Philadelphia. He completed more than 200 murals, mainly of mixed media and primarily in or around Philadelphia's South Street.

== Early life ==
Irwin Zagar was born in Philadelphia and grew up in Brooklyn, New York City. He received his Bachelor of Arts from the Pratt Institute. Soon after, Zagar met his wife, Julia. After getting married, the Zagars volunteered for the Peace Corps and were sent to Peru, where Isaiah became inspired by Peruvian folk art. After three years in Peru, the Zagars moved to South Philadelphia in 1968 where they opened the Eyes Gallery, a folk art shop on South Street. In December 1968, the Eyes Gallery was the site of Zagar's first mosaic; Zagar mosaiced it as a way to create a folk art environment for the art they were selling.

== Works ==
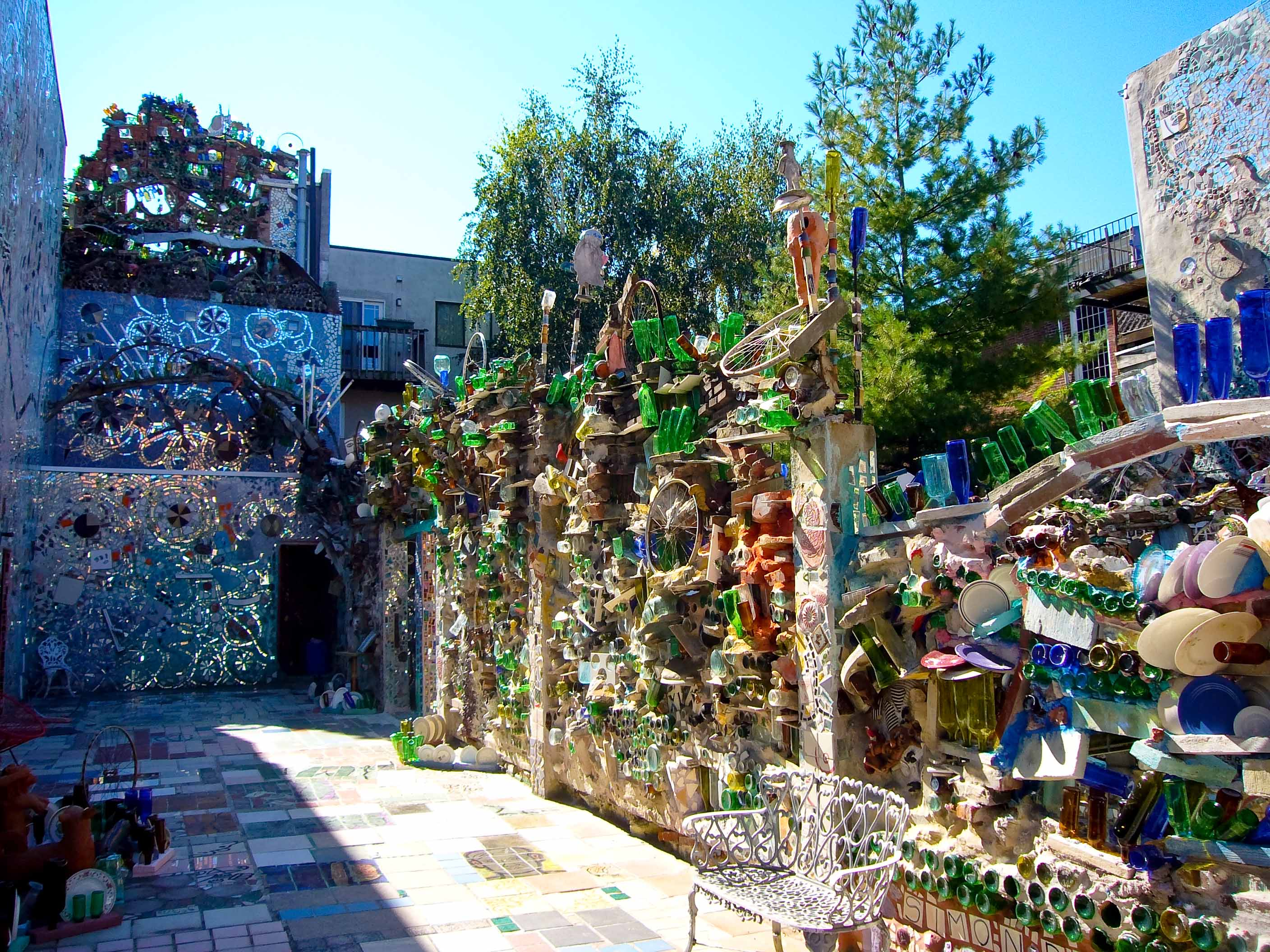
Part of Zagar's Magic Garden

Philadelphia's Magic Gardens, Zagar's largest South Street mosaic work, is a three-dimensional, immersive piece of installation art and a museum gallery space. The mosaics are inlaid with poetry, quotes, names of artists who inspired Zagar, and portraits and forms of people and animals. The gardens use a variety of materials, including bottles, bike wheels, and folk art. Zagar said of his personal creative inspirations.

In 1959, when I was 19 years old, I was introduced to the folk art environment of Clarence Schmidt, My Mirrored Hope, Woodstock, New York, USA. Soon after in 1961 there was a groundbreaking exhibition at The Museum of Modern Art, in New York City called The Art of Assemblage. Because that exhibition included assemblages of artists like Pablo Picasso, Jean Dubuffet, Kurt Schwitters, Antonio Gaudi alongside of untrained brickaleurs Clarence Schmidt, Simon Rodia and Ferdinand Cheval that gave me as a trained artist the rationale to include their concepts as manifestations of fine art. At a crucial time in my life, it allowed me to begin what could be called a life's work making the city of Philadelphia, Pennsylvania into a labyrinthine mosaic museum that incorporates all my varied knowledge and skills.

Zagar began the work that would become Philadelphia's Magic Gardens by cleaning up two vacant lots next to a property he purchased in 1994. After clearing the lots, setting up a chain-link fence, and mosaicing his own property, he began to mosaic the fence and other parts of the abandoned lots. In 2002, the owner of the lots demanded Zagar buy the property for $300,000 or he would have it demolished. Through fundraising, private donations, and a lot of community support, the property was able to be saved. A nonprofit organization, Philadelphia's Magic Gardens, was established to preserve and display the work.

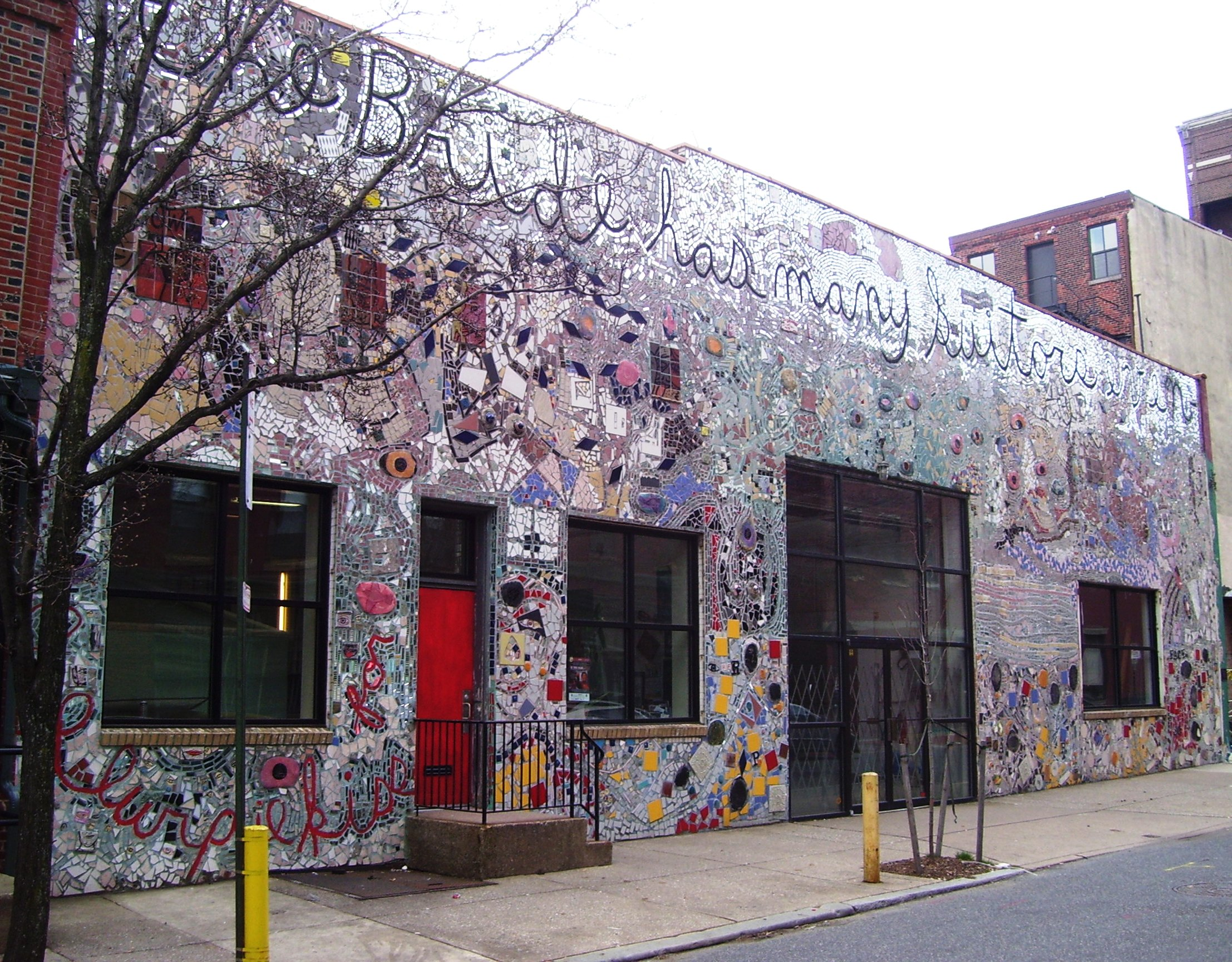
The front of the Painted Bride Art Center, showing Zagar's Skin of the Bride mosaic, which covers the entire building; the text along the top says "The Bride has many suitors, even", a reference to Marcel Duchamp's The Bride Stripped Bare By Her Bachelors, Even

From 1991 to 2000, Zagar mosaiced the entire exterior of the Painted Bride Art Center on Vine Street between North 2nd and 3rd Streets in the Old City neighborhood of Philadelphia, a work he entitled Skin of the Bride, which he donated to the center. In 2023, the art center was sold and the mural was disassembled, with about 30% of the original tiles salvaged to be utilized in future mosaics.

Zagar continued to create mosaic murals in Philadelphia, mainly around the South Street area. Between 1968 and 2026, he completed more than 200. For some time, he hosted a workshop during the last weekend of each month from April to October where participants could help him create a mural. Much of Zagar's work was completed free of charge or is commissioned by businesses or people in the area. A walking tour is available from Philadelphia's Magic Gardens that takes visitors to 20 of these mosaic murals.

== Death ==
Zagar died on February 19, 2026, at the age of 86, due to complications of Parkinson's disease and heart failure.

== Awards and honors ==
- Pew Charitable Trust Individual Artist Fellowship Grant of $50,000 for work in the interdisciplinary arts, Philadelphia, Pennsylvania 1995.
- National Endowment for the Arts for sculpture, Washington, D.C. 1979.
- Member of the Philadelphia Dumpster Divers Artists Association.

== See also ==
- In a Dream (film about Zagar, directed by his son, Jeremiah Zagar)
