= 2022 Philadelphia shooting =

Mass shooting in Pennsylvania, U.S.

- Location: 39.941758°N 75.15069°W; Philadelphia, Pennsylvania, U.S.
- Date: June 4, 2022 (EST)
- Attack type: Mass shooting
- Weapon: Semi-automatic handguns
- Deaths: 3 (including one of the perpetrators)
- Injuries: 11 (including two of the perpetrators)
- Motive: Possible gang-related dispute

On June 4, 2022, three people were killed and eleven others were injured in a shooting on South Street in Philadelphia, Pennsylvania, United States.

== Background ==
South Street is a popular night time destination in Philadelphia. It is home to a number of stores, restaurants, bars, and performance venues. The Theatre of Living Arts, which is located in between Third and Fourth Streets, where the shooting took place, was hosting the band Dying Fetus. Close to South Street is the Philadelphia Gayborhood, which had been the site of gay pride events that day, as part of Pride Month.

The shooting took place on a Saturday night, which is when South Street is typically most crowded. On the weekends, South Street is shut down to traffic, and during the summertime weekends, there is a large police presence. However, according to local business owners, police did not enforce the curfew for teenagers, or the ordinances restricting loud music and ATVs. Prior to the shooting, at 9 pm, two men could be seen brandishing firearms in the waists of their pants, which caused onlookers to flee.

== Shooting ==
Police reported that the shooting took place on Fourth and South Street around 11:30pm. Cellphone footage prior to the shooting that was corroborated by The Philadelphia Inquirer showed a heated confrontation and fistfight preceding the gunfire. Two men approached a third man, who was standing outside a Rita's Italian Ice. The men were later identified as Rashaan Vereen, Gregory Jackson, and Mika Townes. The video shows Jackson and Townes arguing before Jackson pulled out a gun. Jackson and Vereen began to fight Townes for about 15 seconds before Jackson opened fire and hit Townes, who then returned fire and killed Jackson. Vereen is seen in video footage, picking up Jackson's gun and handing it off to another individual in a blue hoodie before staying with Jackson. As a result of the gunfire, a third shooter, Quran Garner, returned fire down the street.

Responding officers began to focus on Garner who had pointed his weapon at officers and opened fire striking Garner. Garner was transported to the hospital for his wounds and later arrested. A Philadelphia police captain said that officers first heard gunshots near Second and South Streets and saw multiple shooters. The shooting resulted in chaos on South Street with people sprinting to flee the area. Amid the chaos, trash cans were knocked over and car windows were smashed.

At least five guns were fired during the shooting. Weapons recovered at the scene included two-semi automatic handguns, one of which had an extended magazine. At the time of the shooting Jackson and Townes had licenses to carry a gun while Garner did not.

== Victims ==
Police identified the three victims who were killed; their ages were 22, 24, and 34. Police said two of them were bystanders with no connection to the suspects.

Thirteen people were injured and were taken to Thomas Jefferson University Hospital, Pennsylvania Hospital, and Penn Presbyterian Medical Center. The victims ranged in age between 17 and 69 years old, with a majority believed to be innocent bystanders. A shooting suspect was taken to Penn Presbyterian Medical Center and treated for a gunshot wound to the forearm.

== Investigation ==
Investigators were unable to immediately retrieve all footage of the shooting, as some businesses in the area were closed for the night. Once it was retrieved, the video was used to identify those involved in the shooting, and two men were arrested in connection with the shooting by June 7.

== Perpetrators ==
After the shooting, 34-year-old local resident Rashann Vereen (born December 5, 1987) and 18-year-old local resident Quran Garner (born August 29, 2003) were arrested. Vereen was charged with attempted murder, aggravated assault, and firearms-related offenses. Garner was charged with aggravated assault and aggravated assault on law enforcement amongst other charges. Mika Townes was not charged, as officers believe he acted in self-defense. A fourth person was sought in connection with the case.

In September 2022, three suspects—Garner, Nasir Jackson and Namir Jones—appeared in court for a preliminary hearing. Jackson and Jones, also known as Nahjee Whittington and Qaudir Dukes-Hill respectively, were charged with murder and conspiracy for the deaths of Kristopher Minners, 22 and Alexis Quinn, 24, both of whom were bystanders. The third person killed, Gregory Jackson, 34, died in the previous altercation prior to the mass shooting.

In August 2023, Garner pleaded guilty to a firearms charge and was sentenced to a minimum of 18 months in prison.

In March 2024, Vereen was sentenced to 9-23 months in prison after being convicted of simple assault, conspiracy and recklessly endangering a person.

In October 2024, Quadir Dukes Hill (a.k.a. Namir Jones) and Nahjee Whittington (a.k.a. Nasir Jackson) pleaded guilty to third degree murder for the deaths of Minners and Quinn. They also pleaded guilty to conspiracy, reckless endangerment, assault and gun related offenses. (Note: Hill and Whittington pleaded guilty to 1 murder charge each, Hill's murder charge was for Minners while Whittington's was for Quinn, only Whittington was convicted of assault) In December, the pair were each sentenced to 15 to 50 years in prison.

== Aftermath and response ==
Following the shooting, Michael Harris, the executive director of the South Street Headhouse Business District, stated that he believes getting some customers to return to South Street will be more of a challenge in the near future. Mark Squilla, a member of the Philadelphia City Council proposed that police enforce a curfew at a specific time for South Street. South Street was closed for the night of June 5 for both traffic and pedestrians but re-opened early in the morning of June 6.

Mayor Jim Kenney decried the shooting as "beyond devastating", and stated that an investigation is ongoing. At the time of the shooting, Kenney was in Reno, Nevada for the United States Conference of Mayors. He was scheduled to travel on Sunday night to the Yale Mayors College conference, but after the shooting, he opted to return to Philadelphia. Pennsylvania Attorney General Josh Shapiro called for more policing on South Street. Philadelphia District Attorney Larry Krasner said the shooting was proof that Pennsylvania and the United States needs more regulation on guns. He also called for Pennsylvania legislators to boycott donations and lobbyists from the National Rifle Association of America (NRA).

On June 6, the Philadelphia Eagles hosted a gun buyback event at the Lincoln Financial Field and offered $100 gift cards to each person who turned in an unloaded firearm. Eagles quarterback Jalen Hurts issued a statement at a press conference highlighting the need to get the weapons off the streets. He also referenced other recent mass shootings in Uvalde, Texas and Tulsa, Oklahoma stating; "I can imagine my sister not coming home from her school. I can imagine my grandma not coming home from the hospital where she's supposed to be safe and cared for."

A year after the shooting, local news stations published retrospectives about the event.

== See also ==
- List of mass shootings in the United States in 2022
