= In a Dream (film) =

- Theatrical poster
- Directed by: Jeremiah Zagar
- Produced by: Jeremy Yaches
- Cinematography: Erik Messerschmidt; Mark Stetz
- Edited by: Keiko Deguchi; Jeremiah Zagar
- Music by: Kelli Scarr
- Distributed by: IndiePix Films
- Release dates: March 9, 2008 (SXSW); April 2009 (United States)
- Running time: 78 minutes
- Country: United States
- Language: English

In a Dream is a 2008 American documentary film about artist Isaiah Zagar, directed by his son, Jeremiah Zagar. It premiered on March 9, 2008, at the South by Southwest film festival. Its broadcast premiere was August 19, 2009 on HBO.

== Synopsis ==
In a Dream is a documentary about Philadelphia-based artist Isaiah Zagar that was filmed and directed by his son, Jeremiah. Isaiah is famous for his complex, highly detailed mosaics, which cover 50,000 square feet (4,600 m^{2}) of South Philly with elaborate designs made from tiles and mirror pieces. These mosaics chronicle his relationship with his wife, Julia, and make him a dominant figure in the city's arts scene. Zagar reveals many personal details of his life during the film, including revelations about his childhood and the existence of an adulterous relationship that threatens to tear his family apart.

== Technical notes ==
The film was shot between 2001 and 2008 and utilizes a variety of film and video formats – 8 mm, 16 mm and 35 mm as well as high definition and digital video.

== Soundtrack ==
In A Dream features music by The Books, Explosions In The Sky, Efterklang, Colleen, Bibio and an original score by Kelli Scarr.

== Reception ==
On the review aggregator website Rotten Tomatoes, 79% of 24 critics' reviews are positive. The website's consensus reads: "This tender tribute to an obscure artist's work is both compelling and visually striking."

In A Dream emerged on the film festival circuit in 2008 and quickly won a variety of awards:

- SXSW Film Festival: Emerging Visions Audience Award
- Woodstock Film Festival: Best Documentary, Best Editing
- Biografilm Festival: Grand Prize
- Philadelphia Film Festival: Best First Film
- San Francisco International Documentary Festival: Audience Award – Best Film
- Full Frame Film Festival: Guggenheim Emerging Artist Award
- Big Sky Film Festival: Artistic Vision Award
- Salem Film Festival: Jury Award for Best Documentary

== Reviews ==
"Bursting with vivid home movies and loving appreciations of Isaiah's artwork - frenzied drawings and monumental mosaics in tile and mirror, many of which now beautify his Philadelphia neighborhood - 'In a Dream' abounds in visual pleasure." - Nathan Lee, The New York Times

"Where most documentarians would rest on the laurels of a great subject and riveting present-tense drama, director Jeremiah Zagar has observed too much of his father's creative logic to cheat us with artless hagiography. In dreamily paced tracking shots, macro close-ups, time-lapse glimpses of Isaiah's processes, archival footage, and animation, In a Dream exhibits as much beauty and sensuality as Isaiah's work, while the unabashedly personal nature of the filmmaker-subject dynamic is as candid about familial madness as Tarnation, and captures more insight than those Friedmans did." - Aaron Hillis, The Village Voice

"What began as a look at a father's art becomes an unintended record of an American family's dissolution in director Jeremiah Zagar's lovingly made, clear-eyed documentary. Though Isaiah Zagar is a devoted dad and talented artist, his inner life is as splintered as his mosaic tile creations. After raising two sons - we see one, the director's brother, in the midst of drug rehab - Isaiah begins a relationship with his assistant as his astounded wife tries to figure out her increasingly idiosyncratic husband. The power of Zagar's camera also prompts his dad to drudge up painful childhood memories and wonder where his life is headed. Even in an era of 24-hour confessional TV, this look into complex emotions is gripping." - Joe Neumaier, NY Daily News

"The result is a documentary that is rare in the way that it leads us deep into the emotions and turmoil of a family over the course of several years. Their journey stands as an example of how it is possible for a family to exist and grow together, across many years and problems. Isn't it strange that this offbeat freaky hippie family turns out in the end to fully embody the conservative family-value ideal?" - Mike S. Ryan, Hammer To Nail
