= A Fictional Guide to Scotland =

2003 book

- Author: Meaghan Delahunt, Suhayl Saadi, Elizabeth Reeder (Editors)
- Genre: anthology
- Publisher: OpenInk
- Publication date: 1 September 2003
- Pages: 200
- ISBN: 978-0-9545560-0-6

A Fictional Guide to Scotland is a collection of short stories and one poem from 17 writers who were either Scottish by birth or lived in Scotland at the time of submission. The pieces which made it into the book were selected through an anonymous submissions process with an OpenInk editor Elizabeth Reeder and guest editors, Meaghan Delahunt and Suhayl Saadi, choosing the final pieces.

OpenInk was a group of Glasgow-based writers who came together out of a desire to create publications which offered writers and readers a unique experience. The OpenInk Editorial board was entirely voluntary. One of the editors was a full-time writer working both on her own writing and as a writer in residence in Glasgow. The remaining editors worked by day in a range of professions and wrote in their spare time.

The publication of the book was supported by a grant from Glasgow City Council. In addition, the editors raised a substantial amount of the money required for the project through sponsorship from friends and family.

In addition to the book, OpenInk ran a reading tour entitled A Fictional Guide to Scotland. This reading tour visited places as far and wide as Wigtown, Ullapool, Inverness, Edinburgh, Stirling, Lanark and Glasgow and was supported by the Scottish Arts Council.
