= Danny Bew =

English footballer

Personal information
- Full name: Daniel Crombie Bew
- Date of birth: 1896
- Place of birth: Sunderland, Tyne and Wear, England
- Date of death: 1951 (aged 54–55)
- Place of death: Swindon, England
- Height: 5 ft 9 in (1.75 m)
- Position: Defender

Senior career*
Years	Team	Apps	(Gls)
- Lambton Star
1921	Sunderland	0	(0)
1922	Hull City	11	(0)
1923–1929	Swindon Town	209	(6)
Total		219	(6)
- * Club domestic league appearances and goals

Daniel Crombie Bew (1896 – 1951) was an English footballer. He played in The Football League for Hull City and Swindon Town.
