= Fabric Row, Philadelphia =

Textile district in Philadelphia, US

Fabric Row
- Neighborhood of Philadelphia
- Fabric Row on South 4th Street

- Location within Philadelphia
- Country: United States
- State: Pennsylvania
- County: Philadelphia County
- City: Philadelphia

Area
  - Total: 0.004 sq mi (0.010 km^{2})

Population (2016)
  - Total: 175
  - Density: 44,000/sq mi (17,000/km^{2})
- ZIP Code: 19147
- Area codes: 215, 267 and 445

Fabric Row (Der Ferder, "the fourth", in Yiddish) is a historic Jewish textile and garment district located on South 4th Street in the Queen Village neighborhood of Philadelphia between Bainbridge Street and Catherine Street.

== History ==
Fabric Row had its beginnings when the area was still part of the District of Southwark. Starting in the late 19th century when peddlers were able to purchase licenses for $25. Those who could not afford the $25 fee would rent a cart for $0.25 per day. This business practice allowed some to profit until the 1950s when pushcarts were banned. The area later became a known fabric market where there existed up to 30 fabric retailers between the 1930s until the 1950s at its peak.

In 1996, fabric shop owners on South Fourth Street successfully lobbied the city for official recognition of the "Fabric Row" name.

== Preservation efforts ==
In 2015, the area went through major renovations with many services offered by the organization that manages the South Street Headhouse District. As generations get older and with the lack of succession, many businesses in Fabric Row ceased operations. For example, Marmelstein's had been in business for 96 years before its closure.

There are preservation efforts to retain the "fabric industry" culture on Fabric Row even though the textile market in Fabric Row still remains strong to this day. However, many businesses face uncertainty when the older generations pass and the younger generations leave.

== Demographics ==
Fabric Row Street scene in 2018

In 2016, Fabric Row, a neighborhood statistic which also includes 3rd and 4th Streets, had a population of 175 in an area of 0.004 square miles, giving a population density of 40,972 per square mile. The median household income is $93,750. The area consists of 96 males and 79 females. The median age is 31.6 for males and 34.8 for females. Since the year 2000, the area has experienced a growth of 7%.

== See also ==
- Southwark, Philadelphia, the former district inside which the neighborhood resides in.
- South Street Headhouse District, the current neighborhood that this neighborhood is associated with
