= Suhayl Saadi =

- Born: 1961 (age 64–65); Yorkshire
- Occupations: Physician, author

Suhayl Saadi (born 1961, Beverley, Yorkshire) is a physician, author and dramatist based in Glasgow, Scotland. His varied literary output includes novels, short stories, anthologies of fiction, song lyrics, plays for stage and radio theatre, and wisdom pieces for The Dawn Patrol, the Sarah Kennedy show on BBC Radio 2.

== Works ==
Psychoraag is not just
Midnight's Children-meets-Trainspotting.
Saadi is more thoughtful than Welsh or Rushdie.

— Angus Calder, The Sunday Herald

Saadi's 2004 novel, Psychoraag, which won a PEN Oakland/Josephine Miles Literary Award, was also shortlisted for the James Tait Black Memorial Prize and nominated for both the International Dublin Literary Award and the National Literary Award (the Patras Bokhari Prize) in Pakistan.

The Scottish Book Trust designated Psychoraag one of the 100 Best Scottish Books of all time. The French translation was released in November 2007 by the Paris-based publisher Éditions Métailié.

Suhayl Saadi has written about subjects as diverse as psychedelic music, Sufism, the British pantomime, the future of creativity, and the relationship of literature to global politics, for many periodicals, including The Independent, The Times, The Herald, The Sunday Herald, The Scotsman, and Spike Magazine, and for the British Council. His short story collection, The Burning Mirror, was shortlisted for the Saltire Society First Book Prize in 2001.

Saadi has written stage and radio plays including The Dark Island, The White Cliffs and Saame Sita. He has edited or co-edited a number of anthologies including Shorts: The Macallan Scotland on Sunday Short Story Collection; A Fictional Guide to Scotland; and Freedom Spring: Ten Years On, a compilation of new writing from South Africa and Scotland. He has appeared widely on television, radio and in public literary readings and is currently working on another novel.

Suhayl Saadi has also written song lyrics for classical and folk-rock musical ensembles, including the Edinburgh-based Dunedin Consort, and for the Africa-centred World AIDS Day Project Paradisum. His work has appeared in translation in anthologies, as in 2006 in German in Cool Britannia (Al Kennedy, ed. Berlin: Verlag Klaus Wagenbach).

Among more recent works, Saadi wrote the libretto for Queens of Govan, one of five short operas commissioned in 2007 by the Scottish Opera for its 2008 "Five:15" project.

Saadi is a board member and co-director of the arts production company Heer Productions Limited, which established the Pakistani Film, Media and Arts Festival in the United Kingdom in 2005.

During the month of October 2008, Saadi was the British Council Writer-in-Residence at George Washington University in Washington, D.C.

A novel, Joseph's Box, inspired by the Biblical/Quranic account of Joseph and Potiphar's wife, was published by Two Ravens Press in August 2009 and was nominated for the IMPAC Dublin Literary Award 2011. The novel is set in Scotland, England, Sicily and Pakistan.

== Bibliography ==
Books

- 2009: Joseph's Box. Ullapool: Two Ravens Press. Paperback: ISBN 978-1-906120-44-3.
- 2004: Psychoraag. Edinburgh: Black & White Publishing. Hardcover: ISBN 1-84502-010-3. Paperback: ISBN 1-84502-062-6.
- 2004: The White Cliffs. Dingwall: Sandstone Press. ISBN 0-9546333-1-8.
- 2001: The Burning Mirror. Edinburgh: Polygon Books. Paperback: ISBN 0-7486-6293-6, ISBN 978-0-7486-6293-7.
- 1997: The Snake. (Under the pen name Melanie Desmoulins.) Creation Books. Paperback: ISBN 1-871592-82-8.

Plays

- 2006: Garden of the Fourteenth Moon.
- 2005: The White Cliffs. Glasgow.
- 2004: The Dark Island. London, BBC Radio 4.
- 2003: Saame Sita. Edinburgh.

Librettos

- 2007: Queens of Govan, libretto, Scottish Opera Five:15 project.

Anthologies

- 2005: Freedom Spring: Ten Years On. Editors: Suhayl Saadi, Catherine McInerney. New Lanark: Waverley Books. Paperback: ISBN 1-902407-33-4, ISBN 978-1-902407-33-3.
- 2003: A Fictional Guide to Scotland. Editors: Meaghan Delahunt, Suhayl Saadi, Elizabeth Reeder. Glasgow: OpenInk. Paperback: ISBN 0-9545560-0-3, ISBN 978-0-9545560-0-6.
- 2003: Shorts: The Macallan Scotland on Sunday Short Story Collection. Editor: Suhayl Saadi. Edinburgh: Polygon Books. Paperback: ISBN 0-7486-6329-0, ISBN 978-0-7486-6329-3.

Saadi was also a contributor to Pax Edina: The One O' Clock Gun Anthology (Edinburgh, 2010)

Novellas

- 2006: The Saelig Tales. In Magic Afoot, the first print edition of Textualities magazine. ISBN 0-9552896-0-2, ISBN 978-0-9552896-0-6.
- 2005: The Aerodrome. Dingwall: Sandstone Press. Published online ISBN 1-905207-04-2.
- 2006: The White Cliffs. Dingwall: Sandstone Press. Paperback ISBN 0-9546333-1-8, ISBN 978-0-9546333-1-8.
- 2008: The Spanish House. Published online by the University of Glasgow Association for Scottish Literary Studies in its biannual ezine The Bottle Imp.
