= David Livingstone (broadcaster) =

Broadcaster for Sky Sports in the UK

David Livingstone is a broadcaster for Sky Sports in the UK. He began his career as a news reporter in the early part of the 1970s, and then moved into sports broadcasting, primarily football. He then moved to working for Scottish Television as a reporter and production journalist.

He joined BSkyB at its formation in early 1990, and with the subsequent merger with Sky Sports later that year found himself being a reporter on live football matches as Sky won its first Premier League contract in 1992. Following this Sky bought the rights to screen the PGA Tour and Livingstone joined that team. He is one of only eight men who have been at Sky Sports since its formation.

At the conclusion of the 2018 Ryder Cup coverage, and with heartfelt tributes from Butch Harmon and Nick Dougherty, he departed his longstanding role with Sky Sports, having presented Sky Sports Golf coverage for 23 years.
