= Peter Sermanni =

Scottish footballer

Personal information
- Full name: Peter Hugh Sermanni
- Date of birth: 9 July 1971 (age 55)
- Place of birth: Glasgow, Scotland
- Position: Midfielder

Youth career
- 1986–1987: Celtic Boys Club
- 1987–1990: Liverpool

Senior career*
Years	Team	Apps	(Gls)
1990–1992	Clydebank	34	(4)
1992–1996	Queen of the South	58	(5)
1998	Eastern Suburbs	15	(1)
1999–2002	Blacktown City	61	(2)
2003	Sutherland	?	(?)
Total		168	(12)
- * Club domestic league appearances and goals

Peter Hugh Sermanni (born 9 July 1971) is a Scottish former professional footballer who played as a midfielder.

== Career ==
After playing youth football for Celtic Boys Club and Liverpool, Sermanni made his professional senior debut during the 1990–91 season with Clydebank, and later played for Queen of the South, making a total of 92 appearances in the Scottish Football League for both teams. Sermanni later played in Australia for Eastern Suburbs, Blacktown City and Sutherland.

His uncle Tom was also a footballer who moved to Australia, and later became a successful international coach in women's football.
