= Mary Ellen Bews =

New Zealand School principal and educationalist

Mary Ellen Bews (20 August 1856–29 March 1945) was a New Zealand school principal and educationalist.

== Biography ==
She was born on August 20th, 1856 in Glasgow, Lanarkshire, Scotland. She was the founder and manager of Mount Eden College in 1895–1914, one of the first colleges for girls in New Zealand.
