= David Livingstone (cricketer) =

Scottish cricketer

Cricket information
- Batting: Right-handed
- Bowling: Right-arm off-break

Career statistics
Competition	First-class
Matches	18
Runs scored	102
Batting average	6.37
100s/50s	0/0
Top score	16*
Balls bowled	2,982
Wickets	50
Bowling average	25.10
5 wickets in innings	4
10 wickets in match	1
Best bowling	6/33
Catches/stumpings	5/0
- Source: CricketArchive

David Livingstone (23 February 1927 – 9 February 2011) was a Scottish first-class cricketer. He was a right arm off-spinner and took the only 10 wicket haul of his career against Ireland at Dublin in 1957. He also propelled Scotland to a famous victory against Warwickshire at Edgbaston in 1957 with 5–47 in the second innings; and he took 6–93 against Australia in Aberdeen in 1964. He had 25 representative caps for Scotland to his name. Livingstone was born in Glasgow in 1927 and died at his home on the Isle of Skye in February 2011.
