= Joseph Urie =

Scottish painter (born 1947)

- Born: 1947 (age 77–78); Glasgow, Scotland
- Education: Duncan of Jordanstone College of Art; Royal Academy Schools
- Occupation: Artist

Joseph Urie (born 1947) is a Scottish artist living in Glasgow.

== Biography ==
Born in Glasgow in 1947 he trained at the Duncan of Jordanstone College of Art in Dundee from 1977 to 1981 and after working in sculpture attended the Royal Academy Schools from 1981 to 1984, concentrating on painting. He won a number of awards including the Chalmers Jervis Prize and the British Institute Prize in 1980, the Farquhar Reid travelling scholarship in 1981, and the J van Beuren Wittman prize in 1984.

He is an expressionist painter, often autobiographical with use of symbols, rich colours and thick, textured brush strokes. Included in the influential “Vigorous Imagination” exhibition at SNGMA in 1987 along with rising stars Peter Howson, Ken Currie, and Stephen Conroy. His work is included in the City collections of Glasgow, Edinburgh and Dundee.

== Works ==
Some examples of his works may be found on Art UK (works in oils in public collections) and and and

Art auction results for a number of his works may be found at

== Exhibitions ==
- Work on Paper 1978 – 2014, 13 September – 5 October 2014
- Sayle Gallery Douglas Isle of Man
