= Fathers (Mare of Easttown) =

- Mare of Easttown episode
- Episode no.: Episode 2
- Directed by: Craig Zobel
- Written by: Brad Ingelsby
- Cinematography by: Ben Richardson
- Editing by: Amy E. Duddleston; Naomi Sunrise Filoramo
- Original air date: April 25, 2021
- Running time: 58 minutes

Guest appearances
- Izzy King as Drew Sheehan; Mackenzie Lansing as Brianna Del Rasso; Connie Giordano as Patty Del Rasso; Eric T. Miller as Tony Del Rasso; Katie Kreisler as Trish Riley; Vanita Kalra as Dr. Christine Long; Kassie Mundhenk as Moira Ross; Patrick McDade as Glen Carroll; Drew Scheid as Geoff Gabeheart; Anthony Norman as Nathan Forde; Brian Rock as Katie's Uncle; Lauren Pilgermayer as Server; Patsy Meck as Jan Kelly; Justin Hurtt-Dunkley as Officer Trammel; Kittson O'Neill as Officer Susie Holbert; Pat DeFusco as Officer Tommy Boyle; Brian Gallagher as Corporal Jimmy Masterson; Katie Meginniss as Book Signing Guest; Hannah Flannery as Shannon; Caroline Mixon as Kerry; Meredith Sullivan as Kylie; Rachel Poletick as Kelly; Sadat Waddy as Sean; Joey Blanco as Teen Boy at Party; Jared Michael Delaney as Reporter #1; Brooke Stacy Mills as Reporter #2; Jeremy Gabriel as Steve Hinchey; Debbie Campbell as Katherine Hinchey; Cody Carter as Valet; Gabi Faye as Brianna's Friend

Episode chronology
← Previous "Miss Lady Hawk Herself"	Next → "Enter Number Two"

"Fathers" is the second episode of the American crime drama television miniseries Mare of Easttown. The episode was written by series creator Brad Ingelsby, and directed by executive producer Craig Zobel. It was first broadcast on HBO in the United States on April 25, 2021, and also was available on HBO Max on the same date.

The series is set in the fictional suburb of Easttown, Pennsylvania, and follows police detective Marianne "Mare" Sheehan. Mare is a local hero, having scored the winning basket in a high school basketball game that won Easttown its first state championship 25 years earlier. But she also faces public skepticism due to her failure in solving a case, while also struggling with her personal life. In the episode, Mare begins her investigation into Erin's murder, while also getting introduced to a new partner.

According to Nielsen Media Research, the episode was seen by an estimated 0.735 million household viewers and gained a 0.10 ratings share among adults aged 18–49. The episode received critical acclaim, who praised the character development, intrigue and cliffhanger.

== Plot ==
Mare arrives at the creek, where she inspects Erin's corpse. She visits Erin's drunk father, Kenny, to inform him of the news. Kenny is devastated, and immediately believes Dylan killed Erin, as he hated her for keeping the baby. Mare questions Dylan, who provides details, but omits Brianna beating her. After giving a press conference, Mare is introduced to Detective Colin Zabel, who was appointed to Erin's and Katie's case as he solved a nearby cold case.

Siobhan and Helen take Drew to play with Carrie Layden, his mother and Kevin's wife before his death. A recovering addict, she reveals that she will seek full custody of Drew. After finding the video where Brianna assaults Erin, Mare and Colin arrest her at her family restaurant. Brianna is aggressive, and reveals to Colin that Mare's son, Kevin, died by suicide. Mare confronts Siobhan for not mentioning her visit to the party, and she agrees to testify.

The following day, Mare visits a doctor, as she is concerned over Drew's blinking tic. The doctor claims this is normal, but Mare expresses her concerns to Frank, as she believes that Drew might have inherited the mental illness that caused Kevin's suicide. Mare and Colin proceed to interrogate all of the partygoers, including Siobhan, but none provide a lead in the case. Afterwards, Mare finally accepts to go out with Richard to a reception in his honor. She feels distant and overshadowed by other women, and despite staying per Richard's request, the date goes poorly. On her way out, Mare is harassed by Brianna's father, Tony, who scolds her for arresting his daughter.

Dylan leaves for cigarettes, when he is held at gunpoint by Kenny in his car, who forces him to drive to the turnpike. He takes him to the woods, forcing him to run before shooting him in the back. Mare arrives at a gas station owned by Dawn, finding that Tony is following her. They have a tense argument in the station, before Dawn asks Tony to leave her. Tony later throws a gallon of milk through Mare's window before fleeing. Jess Riley, Erin's best friend who was with her before she left for the party, confides in her mother that Erin made her promise something. She and her mother visit Lori, telling her that Dylan is not the father of Erin's baby; Jess believes it was Frank, Erin's former teacher.

== Production ==
=== Development ===
The episode was written by series creator Brad Ingelsby, and directed by executive producer Craig Zobel. It marked Ingelsby's second writing credit, and Zobel's second directing credit.

== Reception ==
=== Viewers ===
In its original American broadcast, "Fathers" was seen by an estimated 0.735 million household viewers with a 0.10 in the 18–49 demographics. This means that 0.10 percent of all households with televisions watched the episode. This was a 22% increase from the previous episode, which was watched by 0.600 million viewers with a 0.08 in the 18-49 demographics.

=== Critical reviews ===
"Fathers" earned critical acclaim. Joshua Alston of The A.V. Club gave the episode an "A" grade and wrote, "Even before the pole-axing double cliffhanger, “Fathers” finds Mare at a level and pace of storytelling that feels almost jarring after a pilot that spends most of its energy setting the table. It's a nifty twist on the contemporary murder-mystery series, many of which burn through their gunpowder setting up the crime, only to spend subsequent episodes retreating into subplots."

Roxana Hadadi of Vulture gave the episode a 4 star rating out of 5 and wrote, "There was a feral quality to how Charlie raged in response to that discovery, and Kenny does the same thing: He pushes away his cousins, he yells and cries, and he threatens Dylan. He's convinced that Erin's ex is the person who killed her, and at this point, I tend to agree!" Liz Shannon Miller of Collider wrote, "If Mare thinks she's found some peace in that moment, little does she know how short-lived it's probably going to be, because Erin's best friend Jess is ready to spill Erin's big secret: her baby's father isn't actually Dylan. And while Jess doesn't know who the real father is, she does have a suspect in mind: Frank. It's a helluva cliffhanger to end things on, and a clear indication that this mystery is just going to get more and more personal for Mare."

Sean T. Collins of Decider wrote, "In terms of artistic quality? I think Mare of Easttown has its work cut out for it. Attempting to balance the very serious business of multiple dead teenagers with enough light material to keep things from getting too grim…well, it takes a very special show to get that balance right, like I'm talking Twin Peaks levels of special. Mare is not in that number, at least not yet. But Kate Winslet is an actor talented enough to carry an entire town, an entire show, on her back. Let's see where she takes us." Sarah Fields of Telltale TV gave the episode a 4.2 star rating out of 5 and wrote, "“Fathers” is an excellent second outing for Mare of Easttown. If viewers weren’t all in at the end of “Miss Lady Hawk Herself,” they should be by the end of “Fathers.”"

Olivia Ovenden of Esquire wrote, "Here we realise the title of the episode isn't just about the fathers closest to Erin, but one close to Mare too, and it won't be long before she has to ask him some uncomfortable questions." Carissa Pavlica of TV Fanatic gave the episode a 4.5 star rating out of 5 and wrote, "We discovered more about Mare's personal life while simultaneously digging into Erin's murder. And like Colin Zabel, we realized that things are so interconnected in Easttown that trying to solve a murder is a nightmare in itself."

=== Accolades ===
TVLine named Patrick Murney as an honorable mention as the "Performer of the Week" for the week of May 1, 2021, for his performance in the episode. The site wrote, "As Erin McMenamin's short-tempered dad Kenny, Patrick Murney has been a terrifying presence so far on HBO's Mare of Easttown. But this week, that terrifying side gave way to wrenching grief as Kenny learned that his daughter was found dead. Murney thrashed about like a caged animal as a furious Kenny had to be restrained by the cops and unleashed a primal scream that doubled as an explanation: “That's my daughter! That's my daughter!” Once he calmed down, Murney spoke with a chilling precision as Kenny announced his certainty that Erin's ex Dylan killed her. And he followed through on that certainty, with Murney tapping into a potent vein of vengeance as Kenny methodically hunted Dylan down and shot him in cold blood. An unforgivable act, maybe, but also an understandable one, thanks to the vivid depth and shading that Murney brought to Kenny's sorrow."
