= Sore Must Be the Storm =

- Mare of Easttown episode
- Episode no.: Episode 6
- Directed by: Craig Zobel
- Written by: Brad Ingelsby
- Cinematography by: Ben Richardson
- Editing by: Amy E. Duddleston; Naomi Sunrise Filoramo
- Original air date: May 23, 2021
- Running time: 59 minutes

Guest appearances
- Izzy King as Drew Sheehan; Cody Kostro as Kevin Sheehan; Kiah McKirnan as Anne Harris; Eisa Davis as Gayle Graham; Dominique Johnson as Freddie Hanlon; Caitlin Houlahan as Katie Bailey; Rose Decker as Kenzie; Kassie Mundhenk as Moira Ross; Gordon Clapp as Pat Ross; Katie Kreisler as Trish Riley; Justin Hurtt-Dunkley as Officer Trammel; Patsy Meck as Jan Kelly; Mackenzie Lansing as Brianna Del Rasso; Connie Giordano as Patty Del Rasso; Eric T. Miller as Tony Del Rasso; Christopher Mann as Ballistic Expert; Sadat Waddy as Sean; Drew Scheid as Geoff Gabeheart; Anthony Norman as Nathan Forde; Dana Kreitz as Carrie's Co-Worker; Satomi Hofmann as Reporter; Allen Fawcett as Jewelry Store Owner

Episode chronology
← Previous "Illusions"	Next → "Sacrament"

"Sore Must Be the Storm" is the sixth episode of the American crime drama television miniseries Mare of Easttown. The episode was written by series creator Brad Ingelsby, and directed by executive producer Craig Zobel. It was first broadcast on HBO in the United States on May 23, 2021, and also was available on HBO Max on the same date.

The series is set in the fictional suburb of Easttown, Pennsylvania, and follows police detective Marianne "Mare" Sheehan. Mare is a local hero, having scored the winning basket in a high school basketball game that won Easttown its first state championship 25 years earlier. But she also faces public skepticism due to her failure in solving a case, while also struggling with her personal life. In the episode, Mare gets re-assigned to the case, while Lori finds her husband is trying to keep a secret from her.

According to Nielsen Media Research, the episode was seen by an estimated 1.209 million household viewers and gained a 0.22 ratings share among adults aged 18–49. The episode received critical acclaim, with critics praising the writing, performances and build-up to the finale.

== Plot ==
Mare, who is recovering from Potts's attack, gets back home from the hospital. Outside her house, news reporters swarm her, Lori, and Helen. Once they’re inside, Lori opens up to Mare about Ryan's fight at school. She also reveals that John is having another affair with Sandra, a woman from his past, and that Ryan's fight was a result of keeping that secret bottled up. During Mare's welcome-home party, Dawn breaks down and expresses her gratitude to Mare for saving Katie.

Chief Carter has a meeting with Mare, informing her that he will assign her to Erin's case since Zabel has been killed. Brianna meets with Mare and Chief Carter, revealing that Dylan lied about his whereabouts; he wasn’t home the night Erin was murdered. Brianna's dad apologizes for his earlier outburst against Mare, thanking her for safeguarding their community and locating the missing girls. Mare and Captain Carter call Dylan in under the pretense of taking a statement, but they make it clear that he is a key suspect in the case, which leads him to request a lawyer. Later that night, Dylan confronts Jess at gunpoint, thinking she talked to the police, and warns her to stay silent.

When a guilt-stricken Mare attempts to apologize and console Zabel's mom, Judy, Judy instantly recoils and angrily slaps Mare. Holding Mare responsible for his death, she scolds Mare for interfering with people's lives, not realizing the chaos it can cause. During therapy, Mare reflects on Zabel's death and Judy's harsh words. Understanding that Judy's remarks impacted Mare, her therapist encourages Mare to think about her son's death, as avoiding the pain won't make it disappear. Mare shares the details of the day Kevin ended his life.

Feeling suspicious, Mare inquires with Lori on the Ross family reunion at the lake. She discovers that date of the Ross family reunion coincides with the date on Erin's heart-shaped pendant, and that Erin attended the reunion. She learns that Erin and her dad, Kenny, shared a cabin with Billy. Mare investigates who gifted the pendant to Erin and finds out it was purchased by someone named "Ross." Meanwhile, Pop Ross informs his son John that Billy returned home covered in blood the night Erin was murdered. John confronts Billy, who breaks down and admits to killing Erin.

John and Billy take one last fishing trip together, bringing along a tackle box that holds a gun. Although Lori was supposed to keep the details from Mare, she confides in Mare about what transpired between Billy and Erin. Mare heads to the lake cabin, while Captain Carter receives a visit from Jess, who admits to burning Erin's journals. She shows him a photograph she saved, and he is taken aback by what he sees, prompting him to request Mare on the phone right away. As John and Billy fish by the lake, Mare closes in.

== Production ==
=== Development ===
The episode was written by series creator Brad Ingelsby, and directed by executive producer Craig Zobel. It marked Ingelsby's sixth writing credit, and Zobel's sixth directing credit.

== Reception ==
=== Viewers ===
In its original American broadcast, "Sore Must Be the Storm" was seen by an estimated 1.209 million household viewers with a 0.22 in the 18–49 demographics. This means that 0.22 percent of all households with televisions watched the episode. This was a 13% increase from the previous episode, which was watched by 1.064 million viewers with a 0.15 in the 18-49 demographics.

=== Critical reviews ===
"Sore Must Be the Storm" earned critical acclaim. Joshua Alston of The A.V. Club gave the episode an "A" grade and wrote, "The interconnectedness of Easttown is jarring and frequently confusing, but the upside of setting a murder-mystery in a town this tightly knit is that Erin's killer was always bound to be someone we've seen before, if only in passing. All that said, Tommy as the killer is satisfying in that it's both plausible and packs an emotional punch."

Roxana Hadadi of Vulture gave the episode a 4 star rating out of 5 and wrote, "We're far from the shallow now, and things are getting murky, dark, and deep as Mare of Easttown nears its conclusion with penultimate episode “Sore Must Be the Storm.” What are the Rosses hiding? And yes, I said “the Rosses,” not just Billy Ross, because I'm not entirely convinced that Billy Ross is DJ's father. I think we can't ignore John Ross, and think “Sore Must Be the Storm” is full of enough intentional obfuscation that we're not meant to ignore John Ross, either." Liz Shannon Miller of Collider wrote, "So yes, while Billy is looking like the odds-on favorite right now as far as guilty parties go, connoisseurs of sad HBO murder shows know that that's just because this is the second-to-last episode of the series, and next week's finale will contain at least two or three big twists on what we think we know."

Sean T. Collins of Decider wrote, "The material surrounding the discovery of Mare's son Kevin's suicide remains strong, for example; the grisly visual of Mare collapsing against her attic stairs as she sees her son's body hanging from the rafters is powerful, as is her daughter Siobhan’s hateful resentment of being the one to first discover Kevin's body rather than Mare. But the show can and does undermine this material with shoddy work elsewhere." Sarah Fields of Telltale TV gave the episode a 4 star rating out of 5 and wrote, "It’s hard to guess how all of these open threads will come together on the last episode. In some cases, we should prepare to have certain plot points go unresolved or not scrutinize them too closely."

Olivia Ovenden of Esquire wrote, "Things are set up for another epic showdown in next week's finale, with Lori admitting to Mare that Billy is Deejay's father, and that he killed Erin because she threatened to tell everyone. Just as you thought they were leaving no twists and turns for the final instalment, enter stage left Dylan and Jess." Carissa Pavlica of TV Fanatic gave the episode a 4.25 star rating out of 5 and wrote, "It's unlikely that we'll have a resolution to their grief in the upcoming finale, but finally, grappling with it is a step in the right direction."
