= Enter Number Two =

- Mare of Easttown episode
- Episode no.: Episode 3
- Directed by: Craig Zobel
- Written by: Brad Ingelsby
- Cinematography by: Ben Richardson
- Editing by: Amy E. Duddleston
- Original air date: May 2, 2021
- Running time: 60 minutes

Guest appearances
- Izzy King as Drew Sheehan; Cody Kostro as Kevin Sheehan; Kiah McKirnan as Anne Harris; Patrick McDade as Glen Carroll; Kassie Mundhenk as Moira Ross; Jeremy Gabriel as Steve Hinchey; Debbie Campbell as Katherine Hinchey; Drew Scheid as Geoff Gabeheart; Anthony Norman as Nathan Forde; Evan Dominguez as Kyle; Lee Avant as Medical Examiner; Alan Pratt as Neurosurgeon; Dominique Johnson as Freddie Hanlon; Daniel Fredrick as Patrick; Rachel Nielsen as Ross; Scott Lehman as Police Dog Handler; Brian Gallagher as Corporal Jimmy Masterson; Justin Hurtt-Dunkley as Officer Trammel; Kittson O'Neill as Officer Susie Holbert; Pat DeFusco as Officer Tommy Boyle; Khalil McMillan as Zabel's Friend; Mackenzie Lansing as Brianna Del Rasso; Gabi Faye as Brianna's Friend #1; Dani Montalvo as Brianna's Friend #2

Episode chronology
| ← Previous "Fathers" | Next → "Poor Sisyphus" |

"Enter Number Two" is the third episode of the American crime drama television miniseries Mare of Easttown. The episode was written by series creator Brad Ingelsby, and directed by executive producer Craig Zobel. It was first broadcast on HBO in the United States on May 2, 2021, and also was available on HBO Max on the same date.

The series is set in the fictional suburb of Easttown, Pennsylvania, and follows police detective Marianne "Mare" Sheehan. Mare is a local hero, having scored the winning basket in a high school basketball game that won Easttown its first state championship 25 years earlier. But she also faces public skepticism due to her failure in solving a case, while also struggling with her personal life. In the episode, Mare and Zabel find a new lead in Erin's murder, while Frank is questioned over his relationship with Erin.

According to Nielsen Media Research, the episode was seen by an estimated 0.918 million household viewers and gained a 0.12 ratings share among adults aged 18–49. The episode received highly positive reviews from critics, who praised the character development and atmosphere.

== Plot ==
Kenny is found by his friends in the creek, confessing that he killed Dylan. He goes to the police station to confess, but Mare surprises him by saying that Dylan survived his wounds. Erin's autopsy reveals that she died around midnight and one of her fingers is missing, but there are no signs of rape, with Mare deducing she was murdered elsewhere and dropped in the creek.

Lori tells Mare that Jess believes Frank is the father of Erin's baby. Mare confronts him over lying about not really knowing Erin. Frank reiterates he is not the father, but admits having helped her with supplies for her baby. He willingly takes a paternity test, while a recovering Dylan is also asked to participate. Erin's phone records reveal that her last call, made after the fight with Brianna, was to Deacon Mark Burton, who claims that he only provided her with counsel. Nevertheless, Mare and Zabel suspect he is hiding something. Unbeknownst to the police, Deacon Mark has Erin's bicycle, which he secretly throws into the river. At a local park, Mare traces the origin of the bullet, eventually finding it.

Mare meets with Carrie Layden, Drew’s mother, who makes it clear she will fight for Drew's custody. Mare swears she will use everything in her power to prevent it, while Carrie claims Kevin despised Mare. Mare continues getting involved with Richard, but she simply ignores her texts. Zabel tries to hit on her at a bar, but she declines his advances, despite him explaining his problems with his previous partners.

The following morning, Chief Carter tells Mare that two packets of heroin were found in Carrie's car, and he found out that it was Mare who stole and planted it. He puts Mare on administrative leave, ordering her to get grief counseling, allegedly believing she still has not moved on from Kevin's death.

== Production ==
=== Development ===
The episode was written by series creator Brad Ingelsby, and directed by executive producer Craig Zobel. It marked Ingelsby's third writing credit, and Zobel's third directing credit.

== Reception ==
=== Viewers ===
In its original American broadcast, "Enter Number Two" was seen by an estimated 0.918 million household viewers with a 0.12 in the 18–49 demographics. This means that 0.12 percent of all households with televisions watched the episode. This was a 24% increase from the previous episode, which was watched by 0.735 million viewers with a 0.10 in the 18-49 demographics.

=== Critical reviews ===
"Enter Number Two" earned highly positive reviews from critics. Joshua Alston of The A.V. Club gave the episode an "A–" grade and wrote, "even as the conclusion of “Enter Number Two” might have been inevitable, the journey to it was far from predictable and truly heartbreaking. Mare's now off the case, not because of any professional misstep, but rather a shocking personal transgression. And it all happens incredibly fast."

Roxana Hadadi of Vulture gave the episode a perfect 5 star rating out of 5 and wrote, "“Enter Number Two” is all about Erin and the sprawling effect her death has on this small community: on her relatives, on her friends, and on Mare, a woman who knows the pain of losing a child, and who has made investigating the loss of other people's children her life, and who does something truly awful to avoid losing another." Liz Shannon Miller of Collider wrote, "Really, this episode is, as befits its nature as an episode of a sad HBO murder show, pretty focused on the investigation with only a few major developments — and as a result is pretty simple to break down."

Sean T. Collins of Decider wrote, "So that's Mare of Easttown at the halfway mark. There's plenty to recommend in this show; there's plenty of red flags as well. We'll see which side wins out in the end — and isn't that the show's biggest mystery?" Sarah Fields of Telltale TV gave the episode a 3 star rating out of 5 and wrote, "“Enter Number Two” is intriguing, just not terribly gripping because most of the intriguing elements of the hour are promises of what's to come rather than anything that happens on the episode itself."

Olivia Ovenden of Esquire wrote, "Having pushed her family away to focus on work, and even seen another side to her ally at work, Mare's world is about to get very small. This might push her to try and continue with the case or spiral into self-pity, but it's a development which reminds us who the real centre of this dark story is." Carissa Pavlica of TV Fanatic gave the episode a 4.25 star rating out of 5 and wrote, "Even though there was movement on the case, this episode was more concerned with the personal aspect of all involved, especially since Mare's friends and family interweave almost every aspect of the case."
