= Illusions (Mare of Easttown) =

- Mare of Easttown episode
- Episode no.: Episode 5
- Directed by: Craig Zobel
- Written by: Brad Ingelsby
- Cinematography by: Ben Richardson
- Editing by: Amy E. Duddleston
- Original air date: May 16, 2021
- Running time: 59 minutes

Guest appearances
- Izzy King as Drew Sheehan; Cody Kostro as Kevin Sheehan; Kiah McKirnan as Anne Harris; Eisa Davis as Gayle Graham; Mackenzie Lansing as Brianna Del Rasso; Caitlin Houlahan as Katie Bailey; Jeb Kreager as Van Driver; Rosa Arredondo as Tammy; Brenda McCullough as Weathered Woman #1; Michelle Pauls as Weathered Woman #2; Patrick McDade as Glen Carroll; Tara London as Betty's Daughter #1; Anna Marie Sell as Betty's Daughter #2; Kassie Mundhenk as Moira Ross; A.J. Tecce as Popular Boy; Adison Finkler as Popular Boy's Friend; Justin Hurtt-Dunkley as Officer Trammel; Pat DeFusco as Officer Tommy Boyle; Carol Florence as Dennis' Wife; Jim Scopeletis as Dennis; Michael Harrah as Mr. Kline; Sadat Waddy as Sean; Jenna Kray as Teen Girl #1; Elliot Frances Flynn as Teen Girl #2; Zachary Gaviria as Teen Boy #1; Anthony Notarile as Teen Boy #2

Episode chronology
← Previous "Poor Sisyphus"	Next → "Sore Must Be the Storm"

"Illusions" is the fifth episode of the American crime drama television miniseries Mare of Easttown. The episode was written by series creator Brad Ingelsby, and directed by executive producer Craig Zobel. It was first broadcast on HBO in the United States on May 16, 2021, and also was available on HBO Max on the same date.

The series is set in the fictional suburb of Easttown, Pennsylvania, and follows police detective Marianne "Mare" Sheehan. Mare is a local hero, having scored the winning basket in a high school basketball game that won Easttown its first state championship 25 years earlier. But she also faces public skepticism due to her failure in solving a case, while also struggling with her personal life. In the episode, Mare and Zabel gain a new lead on a recent disappearance, while Lori begins to feel concerned over Billy.

According to Nielsen Media Research, the episode was seen by an estimated 1.064 million household viewers and gained a 0.15 ratings share among adults aged 18–49. The episode received critical acclaim, who praised the episode's climax and performances.

== Plot ==
After Betty Carroll has a fatal heart attack and crashes her car into a pole, Easttown experiences a blackout. Drew, frightened by the darkness, begins to panic, while Frank steps up to help Mare and Helen during the chaos. Mare notices that Siobhan's computer is still on (running on battery), and sees that the documentary she is working on is open, so she takes a peek. As she watches a clip of Kevin celebrating his birthday, she reflects with a stony expression. Meanwhile, at home, Lori hears her husband John comforting their son Ryan about something, promising to keep it from Lori.

Mare and Helen go to a wake for Betty Carroll, where Frank Carroll openly confesses to having an affair with Helen. Mare, amused by the revelation, teases her mom on the way home, but they both acknowledge the pain that affairs inflict on loved ones and Helen apologizes to Mare for dismissing her when she was a child.

When Mare visits Lori, she learns that Kenny has asked her and John to take in Erin's baby, DJ. Dylan talks about DJ with Brianna, saying his parents want to keep him. Brianna starts to think he’s hiding something since he wasn’t home the night Erin was murdered, leading Dylan to break up with her. Mare agrees to go on a date with Zabel, but she mainly uses it to question him about the case, which really frustrates Zabel. He tries hard not to spill too much information as it could put his job at risk and confronts Mare about the real purpose of their date. Meanwhile, while picking up food, Deacon Mark gets attacked by a group of young teens who berate him for his rape allegations. He comes home injured and confides in Pastor Dan that he was with Erin the night she was killed. He shares that she had called him but was interrupted by a text from someone insisting to meet her in the park. When Pastor Dan presses him, Deacon Mark tearfully confesses to lying to the police because he was afraid of what the consequences might be due to his previous allegations.

Jess, Dylan, and his buddy sneak into Erin's old house, where Dylan grabs cash that Erin had saved for DJ's baby's surgery. Although the group burns Erin's secret journals, Jess secretly holds onto a photo from one of the entries. Mare and Zabel talk to a young prostitute who just escaped being strangled and kidnapped by a guy in a blue van, who smoked Winston cigarettes and remembered part of the license plate. Zabel uses a contact to track down the license plate number. While reflecting on their bad date, Mare admits she's not ready to date because she's still coping with her son's suicide and her custody battle. Zabel then confesses to Mare that he didn't actually crack the case that launched his career; he just used files from a private investigator. As he starts to beat himself up over it, Mare jumps in, saying they're all a bit messed up - and reveals the real reason she's on administrative leave. Before they get back to the investigation, Zabel impulsively kisses Mare.

Using the license plate, they trace the van back to Wayne Potts, who reluctantly lets them into his home (which is revealed to be the creepy kidnappers' place). Once they step inside, Zabel notices a big ashtray filled with cigarette butts and a pack of Winston cigarettes sitting right next to it. Mare alerts Zabel to get his gun ready, as she is unarmed. After Mare asks Potts to lower the music, Katie and Missy realize that surprise visitors are in the house (since he didn't tie them up) and start banging on the old pipes to let Mare and Zabel know they're there. As Potts begins to visibly panic, Zabel goes for his gun, but Potts shoots him in the head and injures Mare, who dashes up the stairs. Potts chases Mare through the attic, where she spots the girls, texts 9-1-1, and tries to find a place to hide. Potts tracks her using hidden cameras, and Mare catches sight of Zabel's gun through the floor boards. When Potts turns his back, Mare takes the chance to attack him and rushes downstairs. She manages to grab Zabel's gun and shoots Potts dead just as he's about to kill her. The police show up, and a shaken, hurt Mare passes out while recalling Kevin's voice from Siobhan's documentary.

== Production ==
=== Development ===
The episode was written by series creator Brad Ingelsby, and directed by executive producer Craig Zobel. It marked Ingelsby's fifth writing credit, and Zobel's fifth directing credit.

== Reception ==
=== Viewers ===
In its original American broadcast, "Illusions" was seen by an estimated 1.064 million household viewers with a 0.15 in the 18–49 demographics. This means that 0.15 percent of all households with televisions watched the episode. This was a slight increase from the previous episode, which was watched by 1.049 million viewers with a 0.16 in the 18-49 demographics.

=== Critical reviews ===
"Illusions" earned positive reviews from critics. Joshua Alston of The A.V. Club gave the episode an "A" grade and wrote, "Easttown roses have thorns, but also razor-edged petals, so every bouquet is grocery-chain carnations and baby's breath. At least that's how it feels to watch “Illusions,” which swiftly connects important dots after all of episode four's dawdling, but brings swift, startling ends for multiple characters."

Roxana Hadadi of Vulture gave the episode a 4 star rating out of 5 and wrote, "“Let's jump in together,” Kevin had (literally) said to her so many years ago, and now Kevin is dead. “Let's investigate together,” Colin had (figuratively) said to her only weeks ago, and now Colin is dead. Mare stands alone, and it seems like a lonely place to be." Alex Abad-Santos of Vox wrote, "“Illusions,” with its gunfight and reveals, sees Mare of Easttown lean all the way into its twisty murder mystery. The people we thought were off the hook might be the biggest villains. The people we thought were doomed are actually still alive. But while it feels the show has cranked up the pace and soapiness, it's worth remembering that Mare of Easttown has always been about Mare's trauma and grief rather than whodunnit."

Sean T. Collins of Decider wrote, "It seems highly unlikely that he's involved in Erin's death — otherwise what will happen in the two remaining episodes? — so it's not as if the case is entirely closed. But still, in the closed narrative ecosystem of a murder mystery, this feels like a cheap cheat. And that's true no matter how many soul-crushing songs you use to do the emotional heavy lifting for you." Sarah Fields of Telltale TV gave the episode a 4.5 star rating out of 5 and wrote, "“Illusion” is the best episode of the series since Mare of Easttown Season 1 Episode 2, “Fathers.” It also marks the end of Mare of Easttown as a slow burn. With only two episodes left and a lot of ground to cover, we can expect an intense final two hours that will hopefully be as gripping as “Illusions.”"

Olivia Ovenden of Esquire wrote, "It is an unexpectedly finale-like closing to the episode given that there are two more to come, which might just mean that the abducted girls don't answer every question we have. As for the many men we have been suspicious of, were they just illusions, as the episode title suggests, intended to distract us?" Carissa Pavlica of TV Fanatic gave the episode a 4.75 star rating out of 5 and wrote, "As evidence built, Mare and Colin quickly made headway into the cases of the missing girls, but by the end of Mare of Easttown Season 1 Episode 5, it no longer appeared that the disappearances had anything to do with Erin's murder."

=== Accolades ===
TVLine named Kate Winslet the "Performer of the Week" for the week of May 22, 2021, for her performance in the episode. The site wrote, "It was as if Mare Sheehan starred in four different movies this week, and Winslet effortlessly glided from one to the next, always keeping her portrayal of Mare emotionally grounded and true. We still don't know how the Erin McMenamin case is going to turn out, but we do know one thing: Winslet can do it all."
