= Sacrament (Mare of Easttown) =

- Mare of Easttown episode
- Episode no.: Episode 7
- Directed by: Craig Zobel
- Written by: Brad Ingelsby
- Cinematography by: Ben Richardson
- Editing by: Amy E. Duddleston
- Original air date: May 30, 2021
- Running time: 67 minutes

Guest appearances
- Izzy King as Drew Sheehan; Caitlin Houlahan as Katie Bailey; Rose Decker as Kenzie; Kassie Mundhenk as Moira Ross; Patrick McDade as Glen Carroll; Eisa Davis as Gayle Graham; Katie Kreisler as Trish Riley; Julianna Zinkel as Sandra Elliot; Drew Scheid as Geoff Gabeheart; Anthony Norman as Nathan Forde; Tabitha Allen as DJ's Nurse; Justin Hurtt-Dunkley as Officer Trammel; Pat DeFusco as Officer Tommy Boyle; Kittson O'Neill as Officer Susie Holbert; Patsy Meck as Jan Kelly; Kelvin Hale as Constable; Mackenzie Lansing as Brianna Del Rasso; Connie Giordano as Patty Del Rasso; Eric T. Miller as Tony Del Rasso; Debbie Campbell as Katherine Hinchey; Jeremy Gabriel as Steve Hinchey; Robert Poletick as Mediator; Jayson Ward Williams as Carrie's Attorney; Newton Buchanan as Reporter #1; Brooke Stacy Mills as Reporter #2; Francesca Calo as Reporter #3; Ed Aristone as Gym Teacher

Episode chronology
← Previous "Sore Must Be the Storm"	Next → —

"Sacrament" is the seventh episode and series finale of the American crime drama television miniseries Mare of Easttown. The episode was written by series creator Brad Ingelsby, and directed by executive producer Craig Zobel. It was first broadcast on HBO in the United States on May 30, 2021, and also was available on HBO Max on the same date.

The series is set in the fictional suburb of Easttown, Pennsylvania, and follows police detective Marianne "Mare" Sheehan. Mare is a local hero, having scored the winning basket in a high school basketball game that won Easttown its first state championship 25 years earlier. But she also faces public skepticism due to her failure in solving a case, while also struggling with her personal life. In the episode, the truth behind Erin's case is finally revealed.

According to Nielsen Media Research, the episode was seen by an estimated 1.519 million household viewers and gained a 0.27 ratings share among adults aged 18–49. The episode received critical acclaim, with high praise to its sense of closure and performances, particularly Winslet and Nicholson.

== Plot ==
The photo reveals Erin next to a sleeping John, while Jess mentions that Dylan knows he isn't the biological father. She goes on to say that they burned the journals to protect Erin's secret, especially since both Erin and Dylan's parents wanted the baby to stay with Dylan's family. At the lake, John prepares to shoot Billy, but Mare interrupts them. Before John can commit suicide, Billy fights him until Mare restrains them and arrests John despite his pleas to kill him.

At the station, John admits he was in a relationship with Erin and is DJ's father. He recalls that Erin called him away from Frank's engagement party to meet her at the park, where she threatened to shoot herself. John says he accidentally shot her while struggling for the gun, and that he and Billy moved her body to the woods to draw suspicion towards the other kids who were there that night. John admits he convinced Lori to lie and tell Mare that Billy killed Erin.

After being convicted, John pleads with Lori to adopt and raise DJ. Billy gets arrested too, but he manages to get out on bail, and Deacon Mark is also released. In the end, John receives a light sentence. When Carrie fails to appear for the custody hearing, Mare finds her in the stairwell, crying, and she confesses that she has relapsed. Carrie agrees to let Mare look after Drew while she goes back to rehab.

Later, while Mare is dining at a restaurant with Helen, Frank, and Faye (who have reconciled), she jokes with Frank about his poor choice of wedding tuxedo and steps away to use the restroom. As she leaves, she encounters Sandra and makes a rude remark. Sandra confronts Mare, stating that she hasn't been unfaithful with John in five years and would never cheat on her husband again.

Mare returns to work and reviews the footage of John's confession. She realizes that even though he shot Erin, he can't recall the make and model of the gun he used. Later, she talks to Chief Carter, who tells her that the ballistics officer is the best in the business and would know they type of gun used. Mare receives a call from Glen Carroll, who is in a state of despair. He confesses that since his wife's passing, he can't keep the house in order. When Mare presses him, he reveals that he's noticed some things missing, including his handgun. When Mare asks for details about the missing gun, Glen describes it, and she suddenly realizes it's the same type of gun used to kill Erin. Glen explains that it recently vanished from his shed and was returned with two rounds missing, and only he and Ryan Ross had access to the shed. After checking the security footage, Mare sees Ryan taking the gun on the night Erin was murdered.

When she goes to talk to Ryan, he flees the scene, forcing her to issue an APB on him. He flees home, just as Mare arrives with more officers. Ryan confesses that he, not John, met Erin at the park and had planned to use Glen's gun to scare her into staying away from his family. Ryan killed her after his attempted intimidation became a physical struggle and he lost control of the gun. He admits that his father John and uncle Billy covered it up to protect him, and Lori confesses that she was aware John had gotten Erin pregnant and that Ryan was the one who killed her, but she went along with the narrative that it was Billy who both impregnated and murdered Erin to protect her son. Ryan is sent to juvenile detention, while a devastated Lori blames Mare for everything and ends their friendship.

After a while, things go back to normal, with Mark heading back to the church and Siobhan decides to leave Easttown to attend the University of California, Berkeley. After Frank and Faye's wedding, the family has a tearful goodbye with Siobhan. Mare, who attended the wedding with Richard, says goodbye to Richard (who is leaving to teach at Bates College) and they confess their love for one another. Mare sticks with therapy. When her therapist presses her, Mare confesses that Lori isn't speaking to her even though she's reached out several times. Mare eventually goes to see Lori, who initially turns her away but eventually collapses in Mare's embrace. Back at home, Mare finally goes back to the attic, the first time since Kevin's suicide.

== Production ==
=== Development ===
The episode was written by series creator Brad Ingelsby, and directed by executive producer Craig Zobel. It marked Ingelsby's seventh writing credit, and Zobel's seventh directing credit.

=== Writing ===
Brad Ingelsby said that the decision to reveal Ryan as Erin's killer took months, before feeling comfortable with the idea, "I took about eight months with the characters in my head and then one day I was like, “Can it be Ryan? That would be really hard on Mare and how it relates to her son and Lori.” That felt like a surprising ending, and also a really emotional one." Julianne Nicholson was content with the idea, "it was satisfying for me to have so much to do around home and motherhood and friendship in that last episode in particular."

== Reception ==
=== Viewers ===
In its original American broadcast, "Sacrament" was seen by an estimated 1.519 million household viewers with a 0.27 in the 18–49 demographics. This means that 0.27 percent of all households with televisions watched the episode. This was a 25% increase from the previous episode, which was watched by 1.209 million viewers with a 0.22 in the 18-49 demographics.

On the night of the airing, it was reported that the HBO Max servers collapsed shortly after the finale was released.

=== Critical reviews ===
"Sacrament" earned critical acclaim. Matt Fowler of IGN gave the episode an "amazing" 9 out of 10 rating and wrote in his verdict, "Mare of Easttown soundly delivered an emotionally devastating finale, with a final act reveal that was shattering while also seemingly improving the lives of almost everyone in its wake. Kate Winslet remained a powerful force throughout the series but Julianne Nicholson was the MVP of "Sacrament," delivering a piercing portrait of a woman shredded by secrets and lies. It will be the quiet acts of love, grace, and forgiveness that will resonate the most from this phenomenal final chapter."

Joshua Alston of The A.V. Club gave the episode a "B+" grade and wrote, "Surely some people attend a murder mystery dinner party and walk away raving about the cook on the scallops, but they're part of an exclusive club. So it'll be interesting to see how “Sacrament” lands with the audience because while it's a triumphant conclusion to Mare's emotional arc, as a conclusion to a mystery, it's a mixed bag."

Alan Sepinwall of Rolling Stone wrote, "Still, the series ends in a relatively hopeful place, especially considering how often Mare could feel like misery porn early in its run. Before Mare makes the horrible discovery about Mr. Carroll's gun, he asks for her advice on coping with the death of his wife, knowing all the tragedy Mare herself has had to cope with in recent years. Mare shares some of what she's learned in therapy, admitting that things never quite get easier, “But after a while, you learn to live with the unacceptable.” That's a lesson that applies even outside the grim confines of a place like Easttown."

Daniel D'Addario of Variety wrote, "A show all about being stuck in place gives its central figure, and us, a final gift: Allowing her to begin a process that all of Easttown has seemed united in beating back, and to use what she's found in herself to begin moving forward." Lucy Mangan of The Guardian gave the episode a perfect 5 out of 5 star rating and wrote, "Winslet's performance as the complicated, loving, fallible and sometimes dislikable Mare has been rightly lauded. So subtle, understated and multilayered: it was a privilege to witness it. The same, undoubtedly, goes for the series entire."

Roxana Hadadi of Vulture gave the episode a 4 star rating out of 5 and wrote, "I'm not sure if continuing to interrogate Erin's murder is exactly the top priority of Mare of Easttown in its final episode. Instead, “Sacrament” spends most of its runtime on all the ways life keeps on moving after Mare confronts John and Billy on Lehigh River." Liz Shannon Miller of Collider wrote, "that's where Mare of Easttown leaves us, after an emotional journey that proved to be far less about whodunnit and far more about families, and loss, and learning to live with it."

Sean T. Collins of Decider wrote, "That's a lot of caveats, I know. But in this episode, at least, the series left me feeling moved, rather than ripped off. Folks, I'll take it." Sarah Fields of Telltale TV gave the episode a 4.5 star rating out of 5 and wrote, "“Sacrament” leaves viewers with the feeling of hope in the darkest of circumstances. It suggests there is the potential to heal even in the face of things we think we can never recover from. It's an ending about resilience and recovery. It's the ending the series earned and the one these characters deserve."

Olivia Ovenden of Esquire wrote, "The show has been defined by its twisty episode endings which delivered a bombshell each week. By contrast, the final shot, which slowly pans out from the ladder to the attic where Mare has gone to face her demons, feels like a final full stop." Carissa Pavlica of TV Fanatic gave the episode a pefect 5 star rating out of 5 and wrote, "It's the perfect ending to another stellar limited series from HBO."

=== Accolades ===
TVLine named Julianne Nicholson the "Performer of the Week" for the week of June 5, 2021, for her performance in the episode. The site wrote, "That, in turn, brings Lori's fury back to the surface. But in Nicholson's deft hands, her demeanor shifts rapidly from cold and eerily apathetic to belligerent and borderline incoherent. In short, Lori was a mess. Nicholson, on the other hand, was downright masterful."
