= Miss Lady Hawk Herself =

- Mare of Easttown episode
- Episode no.: Episode 1
- Directed by: Craig Zobel
- Written by: Brad Ingelsby
- Cinematography by: Ben Richardson
- Editing by: Amy E. Duddleston
- Original air date: April 18, 2021
- Running time: 58 minutes

Guest appearances
- Izzy King as Drew Sheehan; Cody Kostro as Kevin Sheehan; Justin Hurtt-Dunkley as Officer Trammel; Dominique Johnson as Freddie Hanlon; Mackenzie Lansing as Brianna Del Rasso; Connie Giordano as Patty Del Rasso; Kassie Mundhenk as Moira Ross; Patrick McDade as Glen Carroll; Drew Scheid as Geoff Gabeheart; Anthony Norman as Nathan Forde; J. Paul Nicholas as Store Owner; Suli Holum as Stacey Woodley; Patsy Meck as Jan Kelly; Katie Kreisler as Trish Riley; David E. Goodman as Athletic Director; Kittson O'Neill as Officer Susie Holbert; Pat DeFusco as Officer Tommy Boyle; Brian Gallagher as Corporal Jimmy Masterson; Anthony Rugnetta as Bartender; Hannah Flannery as Shannon; Caroline Mixon as Kerry; Meredith Sullivan as Kylie; Rachel Poletick as Kelly; Sadat Waddy as Sean; Gabi Faye as Brianna's Friend; Rose Decker as Kenzie; Brick Rock as Katie's Uncle; Jim Scopeletis as Dennis

Episode chronology
← Previous —	Next → "Fathers"

"Miss Lady Hawk Herself" is the series premiere of the American crime drama television miniseries Mare of Easttown. The episode was written by series creator Brad Ingelsby, and directed by executive producer Craig Zobel. It was first broadcast on HBO in the United States on April 18, 2021, and also was available on HBO Max on the same date.

The series is set in the fictional suburb of Easttown, Pennsylvania, and follows police detective Marianne "Mare" Sheehan. Mare is a local hero, having scored the winning basket in a high school basketball game that won Easttown its first state championship 25 years earlier. But she also faces public skepticism due to her failure in solving a case, while also struggling with her personal life.

According to Nielsen Media Research, the episode was seen by an estimated 0.600 million household viewers and gained a 0.08 ratings share among adults aged 18–49. The episode received critical acclaim, with critics praising the performances, atmosphere and characters.

== Plot ==
In the small community of Easttown, Pennsylvania, Detective Mare Sheehan is annoyed to wake up to attend a prowler case. At the police station, Chief Carter tells Mare that, given that the department has failed to find a girl named Katie Bailey after one year, they are facing pressure from Katie's mother, Dawn, who scolds them in the news. As such, the case is re-opened with a new detective coming in to assist.

After injuring herself by following drug addict Freddie Hanlon for a robbery, Mare visits her mother Helen, teenage daughter Siobhan, and 4-year-old grandson Drew; his father is Mare's son Kevin, who has passed away. She is shocked to learn that they accepted to attend the new engagement party of her ex-husband Frank. She attends the 25th anniversary reunion of her high school basketball teammates, who won their state championship win, with her friend Lori Ross. She runs into Dawn, who refuses to acknowledge her. Afterwards, Mare goes to a bar, where she chats with a man named Richard Ryan, an author who has recently moved to the area, and they end up having sex.

Erin McMenamin, a teenage single mother, hands her baby to the father, Dylan, for a weekend visit. Erin dislikes his new girlfriend Brianna, and is insulted when she asks for money for an ear surgery for the baby. That night, Erin leaves for a party, where she hopes to meet with a man she has been chatting with. However, this is revealed to be a catfishing prank, orchestrated by Brianna and Dylan. Brianna brutally beats Erin, until Siobhan, who was also attending the party, defends her. Humiliated, Erin walks into the woods alone.

The following morning, Erin's lifeless and naked body is found in a creek. Mare is awakening after sleeping with her grandson, when she is shocked to see Kevin for a brief moment. She is subsequently called on the phone, surprised.

== Production ==
=== Development ===
The episode was written by series creator Brad Ingelsby, and directed by executive producer Craig Zobel.

== Reception ==
=== Viewers ===
In its original American broadcast, "Miss Lady Hawk Herself" was seen by an estimated 0.600 million household viewers with a 0.08 in the 18–49 demographics. This means that 0.08 percent of all households with televisions watched the episode.

=== Critical reviews ===
"Miss Lady Hawk Herself" earned critical acclaim. Joshua Alston of The A.V. Club gave the episode an "A" grade and wrote, "The challenge facing cop television now is the challenge to depict a desire for greater accountability in a profession notoriously hostile to it. Mare of Easttown doesn't face that challenge because its protagonist is consumed by accountability. Not the accountability that follows a tragedy or springs from a congressional committee, but the kind that comes from a genuine investment in the community and a desire to improve it."

Roxana Hadadi of Vulture gave the episode a 4 star rating out of 5 and wrote, "the Mare of Easttown premiere sets the table with tragedies past and present, and hints at even more to come. Ingelsby and director Craig Zobel, who will helm all seven episodes, immediately communicate how the small-town tidiness of Easttown — ordered brick townhomes, the rows of headstones in a cemetery, the billowing smoke coming from an industrial skyline — mask a community in crisis. Is anyone who lives here happy? Hard to say."

Liz Shannon Miller of Collider wrote, "The very first thing you hear in Episode 1 of HBO's Mare of Easttown is a girl screaming, which confirms the fact that what we have here is a murder show. But it's an especially nuanced and character-focused murder show, based at least on this premiere episode, which captures one day in the life of Mare, a police detective/grandmother/former high school basketball star, as well as her small Pennsylvania town packed with secrets and sadness." Sean T. Collins of Decider wrote, "At this point, Mare of Easttown's biggest mystery is whether Mare of Easttown will rise above “bog-standard dead-girl plot augmented by hyperspecific local flavor” and become truly memorable TV."

Olivia Ovenden of Esquire wrote, "Show creator Brad Ingelsby has here brought to life another deprived town and a world-wearied protagonist who moves through the world with a sense of pain buried inside them. Winslet's Mare is cranky and short-fused, which we likely wouldn't take note of if it weren't so rare to have a female lead who doesn't care about being liked. Still, it's refreshing!" Sarah Fields of Telltale TV gave the episode a 3.5 star rating out of 5 and wrote, "Without Winslet, Mare of Easttown's first episode is just another entry in a long list of high-profile crime dramas. Winslet makes it a compelling character study that I'm looking forward to unpacking over the next 6 weeks."

Anita Singh of The Daily Telegraph gave the episode a 4 star rating out of 5 and wrote, "the four-star rating here is a bit of a cheat: episode one doesn't merit that, being such a slow-burner. But I've had an advance look at the next couple of episodes, and it's worth persevering. The plot gets going and Winslet makes the most of a role that in lesser hands could be a collection of tropes." Carissa Pavlica of TV Fanatic gave the episode a 4.25 star rating out of 5 and wrote, "The premiere offers a lot of backstory going into Mare of Easttown Season 1 Episode 2. The production goes to great lengths to recreate an eastern PA setting, right down to the sometimes difficult accent, which Kate Winslet does very well."
