= Poor Sisyphus =

- Mare of Easttown episode
- Episode no.: Episode 4
- Directed by: Craig Zobel
- Written by: Brad Ingelsby
- Cinematography by: Ben Richardson
- Editing by: Amy E. Duddleston; Naomi Sunrise Filoramo
- Original air date: May 9, 2021
- Running time: 57 minutes

Guest appearances
- Izzy King as Drew Sheehan; Cody Kostro as Kevin Sheehan; Kiah McKirnan as Anne Harris; Dominique Johnson as Freddie Hanlon; Eisa Davis as Gayle Graham; Jeremy Gabriel as Steve Hinchey; Debbie Campbell as Katherine Hinchey; Katie Kreisler as Trisha Riley; Brooke Stacy Mills as Reporter; Caitlin Houlahan as Katie Bailey; Justin Hurtt-Dunkley as Officer Trammel; Brian Anthony Wilson as Medic; Russ Widdall as David Sager; Rose Decker as Kenzie; Jeb Kreager as Van Driver

Episode chronology
← Previous "Enter Number Two"	Next → "Illusions"

"Poor Sisyphus" is the fourth episode of the American crime drama television miniseries Mare of Easttown. The episode was written by series creator Brad Ingelsby, and directed by executive producer Craig Zobel. It was first broadcast on HBO in the United States on May 9, 2021, and also was available on HBO Max on the same date.

The series is set in the fictional suburb of Easttown, Pennsylvania, and follows police detective Marianne "Mare" Sheehan. Mare is a local hero, having scored the winning basket in a high school basketball game that won Easttown its first state championship 25 years earlier. But she also faces public skepticism due to her failure in solving a case, while also struggling with her personal life. In the episode, Mare continues doing her own investigation, while a new disappearance appears to connect to previous cases.

According to Nielsen Media Research, the episode was seen by an estimated 1.049 million household viewers and gained a 0.16 ratings share among adults aged 18–49. The episode received positive reviews from critics, who praised its pace and cliffhanger.

== Plot ==
With Mare suspended, Zabel is given a new partner to cooperate in the investigation. The paternity results for Erin's baby reveal that the father is neither Frank nor Dylan. While Dylan grows frustrated by the revelation, he continues taking care of the baby at the hospital. A girl, Missy Sager, goes missing, and the media begins connecting her disappearance to Katie.

Dawn is called by a stranger, who claims to have Katie as a hostage, demanding $5,000 for her return. While initially dismissing it as a possible scam, the stranger later calls to confirm more details of Katie. Carrie gets Drew for the night, but begrudgingly returns him to Mare when he becomes homesick. Mare remembers Kevin and Carrie violently abusing her and robbing her for drug money. Siobhan struggles with her own feelings about Kevin and her family. She ends her relationship with Becca and begins a new relationship with Anne, who she met through a gig her band did.

While investigating, Zabel discovers Deacon Mark was transferred from his previous parish after allegations of inappropriate behavior with an underaged girl, which is why he was trying to avoid his calls. Despite her suspension, Mare continues doing her own research on Erin's case. She checks Erin's dresser, finding a heart-shaped necklace engraved with a date. Jess informs Mare that Erin, desperate to pay money for her child's ear surgery, considered participating in a sex service, although she notes she never used it.

Retrieving money from the gas station, Dawn drives to a location while following the stranger's instructions. She arrives at a cabin, where the stranger claims to have Katie. When he reaches for the bag, Dawn attacks him and he slips. He finds that the bag only contains papers and removes his mask, revealing himself to be Freddie Hanlon. He apologizes for the scheme, and flees. Somewhere, Missy is taken by a man to the attic of a tavern, locking her in a soundproof room. There, Missy meets another girl, revealing herself to be Katie.

== Production ==
=== Development ===
The episode was written by series creator Brad Ingelsby, and directed by executive producer Craig Zobel. It marked Ingelsby's fourth writing credit, and Zobel's fourth directing credit.

== Reception ==
=== Viewers ===
In its original American broadcast, "Poor Sisyphus" was seen by an estimated 1.049 million household viewers with a 0.16 in the 18–49 demographics. This means that 0.16 percent of all households with televisions watched the episode. This was a 14% increase from the previous episode, which was watched by 0.918 million viewers with a 0.12 in the 18-49 demographics.

=== Critical reviews ===
"Poor Sisyphus" earned positive reviews from critics. Joshua Alston of The A.V. Club gave the episode a "B" grade and wrote, "Alas, “Poor Sisyphus,” easily the show's weakest episode so far, serves as a reminder that in a story with so many reveals to parcel out, there can't be peaks without troughs. “Sisyphus” is certainly not a bad hour of television. But it spends the bulk of its time fleshing out subplots that initially seemed to serve more as a window dressing rather than going story concerns."

Roxana Hadadi of Vulture gave the episode a 4 star rating out of 5 and wrote, "She doesn't like him enough to tell him the truth about why she went back to Jess's apartment, or about finding Erin's journals, but Mare's self-preservation instincts don't seem to quit. Too bad. If Mare paused for a second while pushing her boulder up that mountain, standing beside Colin for a bit might be kind of nice." Liz Shannon Miller of Collider wrote, "Overall, "Poor Sisyphus" is filled with small but key character beats, like Drew's mom, Carrie, trying to rebuild her connection with her son, while Mare is haunted by the memory of Kevin and Carrie, high and furious, attacking her for money."

Sean T. Collins of Decider wrote, "Mare reads as inconsistent to me. In part this is because its multiple tones don't feel as though they all sprang from the same mind, the way it felt with supreme stylists David Lynch and Paolo Sorrentino behind the camera on those other shows. But I also think it stems from the handling of Mare herself, specifically her attempt to frame her grandson's mother Carrie with that stolen heroin." Sarah Fields of Telltale TV gave the episode a 3.5 star rating out of 5 and wrote, "Mare's story is still the heart of Mare of Easttown and she is still the most compelling character, but it is nice to have the chance to get to know the people in Mare's life a little more outside of their interactions with her."

Olivia Ovenden of Esquire wrote, "Is this subplot all a red herring? Quite possibly, as the episode ends by showing us where Katie really is: in the same miserable room where a faceless man throws Missy and locks the door. Finally, we're about to hear from the girls who so far have been silenced." Carissa Pavlica of TV Fanatic gave the episode a 4.25 star rating out of 5 and wrote, "Mare's relationship with Carrie is so contrary and the lengths she went to in her attempt to keep the girl out of their lives backfired. But it was hard not to feel her giving just a little as Carrie spoke for every other young woman in Easttown when she said, "You know, I'm trying really hard to get my life together. So stop, just stop.""
