= The Hunt (2020 film) =

2020 film directed by Craig Zobel

- Theatrical release poster with the original release date crossed out
- Directed by: Craig Zobel
- Written by: Nick Cuse; Damon Lindelof
- Produced by: Jason Blum; Damon Lindelof
- Starring: Ike Barinholtz; Betty Gilpin; Emma Roberts; Hilary Swank
- Cinematography: Darran Tiernan
- Edited by: Jane Rizzo
- Music by: Nathan Barr
- Production companies: Blumhouse Productions; White Rabbit Productions
- Distributed by: Universal Pictures
- Release dates: March 11, 2020 (United Kingdom); March 13, 2020 (United States)
- Running time: 90 minutes
- Country: United States
- Language: English
- Budget: $14 million
- Box office: $12.4 million

The Hunt is a 2020 American film (Note: Sources differ as to the exact genre of the film; some have classified it as a thriller (specifically satirical thriller, horror thriller, action thriller, and political thriller), while one has called it an action comedy. Others have called it a horror film or horror satire.) written by Nick Cuse and Damon Lindelof, and directed by Craig Zobel. The film stars Betty Gilpin and Hilary Swank alongside an ensemble cast that includes Ike Barinholtz, Ethan Suplee, Glenn Howerton, Amy Madigan, Wayne Duvall, Sturgill Simpson, and Emma Roberts. Jason Blum was a producer under his Blumhouse Productions banner, along with Lindelof. Zobel and Lindelof have said that the film is intended as a satire on the profound political divide between the American left and right. In the film, a group of elites abduct working-class people to hunt them.

The film was first announced in March 2018, and the cast signed on a year later. Filming took place in New Orleans. The film was originally scheduled for release on September 27, 2019. It was released in theaters in the United States on March 13, 2020, by Universal Pictures and received mixed reviews from critics. The onset of the COVID-19 pandemic resulted in the closure of most theaters within a week of the film's release, which resulted in the film underperforming at the box office, grossing only $12.4 million. Universal made The Hunt available digitally on March 20.

== Plot ==
In a group chat, Athena, Ted, Richard, Miranda, Julius, Peter, Martin, Mike and Liberty, discuss an upcoming hunt of "deplorables," (Note: The use of the world deplorables is an allusion to the phrase "basket of deplorables" used by Hillary Clinton during the 2016 United States presidential election campaign to refer to Trumpists.) at a manor. Later, on Athena's private jet, a flight attendant talks to Richard but is interrupted by Randy, who staggers out from the cargo hold. Ted claims to be a doctor and subdues Randy before Athena kills him.

Eleven captives consisting of Crystal, Don, Gary, "Yoga Pants", "Target", "Dead Sexy", "Staten Island", "Vanilla Nice", "Big Red", "Trucker" and "Bandana Man" awaken in a forest, with bit gags locked in their mouths. Crystal leaves while the others go into a field and find a crate, containing a pig and a cache of weapons. Yoga Pants finds the keys to their gags. A rifle is fired at them, killing Yoga Pants. Bandana Man shoots back but is also shot and killed. Dead Sexy falls into a spike pit, impaling herself. Trucker tries to carry Dead Sexy to safety, but steps onto a land mine; he dies and Dead Sexy kills herself. Target is shot against a barbed-wire fence and killed with a grenade.

Big Red, Staten Island and Vanilla Nice reach a service station, whose owners (Julius and Miranda) tell them they are in Arkansas. They realize their situation's similarity to the "Manorgate" conspiracy theory after discovering each was abducted from a different part of the country. Big Red eats a poisoned doughnut, Staten Island is killed with a shotgun while Vanilla Nice is suffocated with poison gas. Julius and Miranda then clean the station. When Crystal arrives to purchase cigarettes, she notices that they are too expensive for the State that Miranda claims they are in, so she takes the shotgun from under the counter and kills Julius and Miranda.

Crystal inspects a pickup truck outside the service station and finds hidden license plates, suggesting she is outside the United States. She also discovers a booby-trap bomb and warns Gary, a conspiracy theorist podcaster. They board a train and discover refugees, whom Gary insists are crisis actors. The train is raided by Croatian soldiers; when Gary tries to convince them of Manorgate and the refugees' duplicity, refugee "Crisis Mike" admits that he is one of the hunters but the other refugees are innocent. The raid was unplanned, and he offers a head start for Gary's cooperation. Gary instead kills Mike with a grenade.

Crystal is taken to a refugee camp where she meets Don. Oliver, an envoy from the Croatian U.S. Embassy, arrives to extract them but during the drive Crystal becomes suspicious of his comments, kicks Oliver out of the car and runs him over. She and Don find Gary's body in the trunk with a box marked "bribe money" and a map. Crystal tells Don the story of "the Jackrabbit and the Box Turtle", in which the Jackrabbit kills the Box Turtle after losing a race with him. (Note: A darker version of "The Tortoise and the Hare".)

At Oliver's intended destination on the map, Crystal kills Richard, Ted, Martin, Peter, Liberty, and injures their tactical consultant Sgt. Dale. Athena calls to Don via radio, asking if he killed Crystal. Don refuses to disarm, aiming his gun at Crystal who kills him. She tortures Sgt. Dale to get Athena's location – revealing during their exchange that she previously served in Afghanistan – then kills him.

In flashbacks, it is shown that Athena's group text exchange was a private joke. However, hackers leaked it on the internet, creating furor over "Manorgate" in the right-wing blogosphere. Subsequently, the group's participants, whose lives were ruined, decide to actually abduct and hunt those responsible for creating and spreading the conspiracy theory. Athena had insisted that Crystal be included after seeing a social media post from Crystal that offended her.

When they confront each other, Crystal tells Athena that she has confused her with another woman from the same city, with a differently spelled middle name. The two fight and impale one another on the blades of a food processor; Athena dies, but Crystal sees a jackrabbit near the body and regains some strength. She cauterizes her wound, takes Athena's clothes and dog, and leaves on her jet, talking to the same flight attendant from the start of the film.

== Cast ==
- Ike Barinholtz as Staten Island
- Betty Gilpin as Crystal
- Amy Madigan as Ma
- Emma Roberts as Yoga Pants
- Ethan Suplee as (Shut the F*** Up) Gary
- Hilary Swank as Athena
- Sturgill Simpson as Vanilla Nice
- Reed Birney as Pop
- Steve Coulter as the Doctor
- Wayne Duvall as Don
- Glenn Howerton as Richard

== Production ==
=== Development and casting ===
In March 2018, Universal Pictures acquired the rights to the film, and set Craig Zobel to direct it, from a script by Nick Cuse and Damon Lindelof. The original title of the script was initially reported as Red State Vs. Blue State, a reference to the red states and blue states. Later, Universal issued a statement denying that the film had ever had it as its working title. The elite hunters' reference to their quarry as "deplorables" is an allusion to the phrase "basket of deplorables," used by Hillary Clinton during the 2016 United States presidential election campaign to refer to half of the supporters of then-presidential candidate Donald Trump. An early draft of the script depicted working class conservatives as the film's heroes.

In March 2019, Emma Roberts, Justin Hartley, Glenn Howerton, Ike Barinholtz, and Betty Gilpin were announced as being cast in the film. In April 2019, Amy Madigan, Jim Klock, Charli Slaughter, Steve Mokate, and Dean West were added as well. Hilary Swank's casting was announced in July.

=== Filming ===
Filming began on February 20, 2019, in New Orleans, and was completed on April 5.

== Music ==
The Hunt (Original Motion Picture Soundtrack)

Film score by Nathan Barr
- Released: September 25, 2020
- Length: 39:54
- Label: Back Lot Music

Nathan Barr composed the film score, replacing Heather McIntosh. Back Lot Music released the soundtrack.

| No. | Title | Length |
|---|---|---|
| 1. | "Randy Is Awake" | 3:20 |
| 2. | "Gagged In The Woods" | 3:44 |
| 3. | "Weapon Rack" | 2:33 |
| 4. | "Hail Of Fire" | 2:54 |
| 5. | "Arrows and Grenades" | 1:19 |
| 6. | "Constitutional Right" | 2:23 |
| 7. | "Clean Up" | 1:07 |
| 8. | "Not As It Seems" | 3:15 |
| 9. | "Train Chase" | 1:13 |
| 10. | "Jack Rabbit" | 4:36 |
| 11. | "Snowball Dominates" | 3:20 |
| 12. | "Manor Entrance" | 2:11 |
| 13. | "Kitchen Fight" | 5:04 |
| 14. | "Rabbit Released" | 1:49 |
| 15. | "End Credits" | 1:06 |
| Total length: | | 39:54 |

== Release ==
The Hunt was theatrically released in the United States on March 13, 2020, by Universal Pictures. It was originally scheduled for release on September 27, 2019. It was, for a time, moved back to October 18, 2019, before shifting back to September 27. On August 7, 2019, Universal announced that in the wake of the Dayton and El Paso mass shootings, they would be suspending the film's promotional campaign. Several days later, the film was pulled from the studio's release schedule.

In February 2020, the studio announced that the film would be released on March 13, 2020 (Friday the 13th) in the U.S., with a new trailer, partially in response to the success of the similarly controversial film Joker. Producer Jason Blum stated in an interview that "not one frame was changed" since the delay and that it was "exactly the same movie".

In mid-March 2020, movie theaters began to close because of the COVID-19 pandemic lockdown measures. Three days after the film's release, on March 16, 2020, Universal Pictures announced that the film would be available digitally through Premium VOD in the United States and Canada on March 20, before the end of the usual 90-day theatrical run. This was also the case for the studio's other films such as The Invisible Man and Trolls World Tour.

The film was released in three Santikos Entertainment theater locations in San Antonio, Texas on May 1, 2020, after the chain reopened.

=== Home media ===
On May 26, 2020, Universal Pictures released the film on Digital. The Blu-ray and DVD were released in the United States on June 9, 2020. It got a 4K Ultra HD Blu-ray released in the United States by Shout! Factory on April 22, 2025.

== Reception ==
=== Box office ===
The Hunt grossed $5.8 million in the United States and Canada, and $6.6 million in other territories, for a worldwide total of $12.4 million.

In the United States and Canada, the film was released alongside Bloodshot and I Still Believe, and was projected to gross $8–11 million from 3,028 theaters in its opening weekend. The film made $2.2 million on its first day, including $435,000 from Thursday night previews. It went on to debut to $5.3 million, finishing fifth. The weekend was also noteworthy for being the lowest combined grossing since October 1998, with all films totaling just $55.3 million, in large part due to societal restrictions and regulations due to the COVID-19 pandemic. With the closure of many theaters due to COVID-19, the film played almost exclusively at drive-in theaters in the following weeks; it made $279,500 in its 11th weekend and $217,500 in its 12th weekend.

=== Critical response ===
On review aggregator Rotten Tomatoes, the film holds an approval rating of 57% based on 276 reviews, with an average rating of 5.9/10. The site's critics consensus read, "The Hunt is successful enough as a darkly humorous action thriller, but it shoots wide off the mark when it aims for timely social satire." On Metacritic, the film has a weighted average score of 50 out of 100, based on 45 critics, indicating "mixed or average" reviews. Audiences polled by CinemaScore gave the film an average grade of "C+" on an A+ to F scale.

The Hollywood Reporter wrote that there were a pair of test screenings for the film which garnered "negative reactions". The second screening was held on August 6, 2019, in Los Angeles, in which "audience members were again expressing discomfort with the politics" of it, an issue Universal had not foreseen (although other studios had initially passed on the script for that reason). In a statement to Variety, Universal pushed back on a report that test audiences had been uncomfortable with the film's political slant, and also countered claims that the script had originally had an explicitly political title.

The film's trailer received backlash by some in the conservative media for portraying supporters of Donald Trump being hunted by liberals. Trump also issued a tweet on August 9, 2019, criticizing the film industry while stating, "The movie coming out is made in order to inflame and cause chaos"; although Trump did not specify the name of the film, news outlets said it was most likely a reference to The Hunt. Kyle Smith, writing in the National Review, argued that the film has a right-wing, anti-liberal tone that had been misinterpreted by conservative critics of the film's trailer.

In an interview with The Guardian, director Craig Zobel stated he did not make the film in order to create controversy.

=== Accolades ===
| Year | Award | Category | Recipient(s) | Result | Ref. |
|---|---|---|---|---|---|
| 2021 | Critics' Choice Super Awards | Best Action Movie | The Hunt | Nominated | |
| 2021 | Critics' Choice Super Awards | Best Actress in an Action Movie | Betty Gilpin | Won | |
| 2021 | Critics' Choice Super Awards | Best Actress in an Action Movie | Hilary Swank | Nominated | |
| 2021 | Critics' Choice Super Awards | Best Villain in a Movie | Hilary Swank | Nominated | |

== Literary references ==
The movie has been described as a "loose riff on Richard Connell’s short story 'The Most Dangerous Game'". The characters themselves allude to George Orwell's Animal Farm, with the main antagonist referring to the main protagonist as "Snowball".

== See also ==
- The Purge: Election Year
- Hounded (2022 film)
