= Christopher Murney =

American actor

- Education: University of Rhode Island (BA); Pennsylvania State University (MFA)
- Occupations: Actor, voice actor
- Years active: 1974–present
- Spouse: Anne Kidder
- Children: 3, including Julia and Patrick

Christopher Murney is an American actor and voice artist.

== Early life and education ==
Murney earned a bachelor's degree from the University of Rhode Island and a Master of Fine Arts in theatre from Pennsylvania State University.

== Career ==
Murney has worked on the stage, in television series, and in film. In television, he appeared as Buck Miller in 1994 and in 2001 on the soap opera One Life to Live, as Buddy in 1977 The San Pedro Beach Bums, and voiced Union soldier, diarist and fellow Rhode Islander Elisha Hunt Rhodes in the PBS mini-series The Civil War (1990). He is perhaps most widely recognized for his role as Mackie Bloom, a radio actor billed as "The Man of a Thousand Voices", in the 1940s-set period comedy series Remember WENN which ran on AMC from 1996 to 1998.

In the movies, Murney has appeared in such films as 1977's Slap Shot as Tommy Hanrahan, 1985's The Last Dragon as Eddie Arkadian, 1986's Maximum Overdrive, 1987's The Secret of My Success, 1989's Last Exit to Brooklyn, 1990's Loose Cannons, and in 1991's Barton Fink.

His voice can be heard as Chester Cheetah for Cheetos as Dwayne in the 2006 video game VCPR New World Order, talk radio in Grand Theft Auto: Vice City Stories, as the villain Black Garius in Neverwinter Nights 2, and as various characters in Red Dead Revolver.

== Personal life ==
Murney is married to Anne Kidder and has three children, including Julia Murney. His son, Patrick Murney, has appeared in episodes of Law & Order: Organized Crime and Public Morals.

== Filmography ==
=== Film ===
Year	Title	Role	Notes
1974	The Taking of Pelham One Two Three	Dispatcher	
1977	Slap Shot	Hanrahan	
1984	Grace Quigley	Max Putnam	
1985	The Last Dragon	Eddie Arkadian	
1986	Maximum Overdrive	Camp Loman	
1986	Where Are the Children?	Lenny Barron	
1987	The Secret of My Success	Barney Rattigan	
1989	Last Exit to Brooklyn	Paulie	
1991	Barton Fink	Detective Deutsch	
1995	Cafe Society	Frank Frustinsky	
1999	Pioneer 12	Moby	
2001	Way Off Broadway	Mr. Kaufman	
2002	Winning Girls Through Psychic Mind Control	Albert	
2007	Chicago 10	Various voices	
2016	The Passing Season	Tom	

=== Television ===
Year	Title	Role	Notes
1974	The Country Girl	Larry	TV movie
1977	Kojak	Flarrety	Episode: "Lady in the Squadroom"
1977	The San Pedro Bums	Buddy	TV movie
1977	The San Pedro Beach Bums	Buddy	10 episodes
1978	M*A*S*H	Remy	Episode: "Dr. Winchester and Mr. Hyde"
1978	The One and Only Phyllis Dixey	Jack Tracy	TV movie
1979	From Here to Eternity	Cpl. Lewis	3 episodes
1979	You Can't Go Home Again	Milliken	TV movie
1981	Another World	Andy	Episode #1.4206
1981	Kent State	Major Jones	TV movie
1983	The Charmkins	Various roles	TV special
1983	Jacobo Timerman: Prisoner Without a Name, Cell Without a Number	Colonel Rossi	TV movie
1983	Found Money	Warren	TV movie
1985	Miami Vice	ATF Agent Wilson	Episode: "Evan"
1987	Murder by the Book	Lieutenant Greenberg	TV movie
1987	The Equalizer	Rudy Bagler	Episode: "Blood & Wine" (Parts 1 & 2)
1987	The Equalizer	Rudy Bagler	Episode: "Shadow Play"
1987, 1989	Kate & Allie	Mr. Gabriel / Doug	2 episodes
1990	The Civil War	Elisha Hunt Rhodes	9 episodes
1991	The 10 Million Dollar Getaway	Lou Werner	TV movie
1996–1998	Remember WENN	Mackie Bloom	56 episodes
2000	Ed	Chester Jacinski	Episode: "Something Old, Something New"
2025–2026	Robogobo	Mr. Gramble, Sam The Shepherd (voices), Various Voices	8 episodes

=== Video games ===
Year	Title	Role
2004	Red Dead Revolver	Cowboy / Jebidiah Cole / Matthius Lamprey
2005	Land of the Dead: Road to Fiddler's Green	Otis
2006	Grand Theft Auto: Vice City Stories	Kenny Crane / Dwayne Thorn
2006	Neverwinter Nights 2	Black Garius / Prior Hlam
2010	Red Dead Redemption	The Local Population
