= Mare of Easttown =

2021 American crime drama television miniseries by Brad Ingelsby

- Promotional poster
- Genre: Crime drama
- Created by: Brad Ingelsby
- Written by: Brad Ingelsby
- Directed by: Craig Zobel
- Starring: Kate Winslet; Julianne Nicholson; Jean Smart; Angourie Rice; David Denman; Neal Huff; Guy Pearce; Cailee Spaeny; John Douglas Thompson; Joe Tippett; Evan Peters; Sosie Bacon; James McArdle
- Music by: Lele Marchitelli
- Country of origin: United States
- Original language: English
- No. of episodes: 7

Production
- Executive producers: Paul Lee; Mark Roybal; Craig Zobel; Kate Winslet; Brad Inglesby; Gavin O'Connor; Gordon Gray; Ron Schmidt
- Producer: Karen Wacker
- Production locations: Delaware County, Chester County, Philadelphia, Pennsylvania
- Cinematography: Ben Richardson
- Editors: Amy E. Duddleston; Naomi Sunrise Filoramo
- Running time: 58–66 minutes
- Production companies: Zobot Projects; Mayhem Pictures; Juggle Productions; Low Dweller Productions; wiip; HBO Productions

Original release
- Network: HBO
- Release: April 18 – May 30, 2021

Related
- Task

Mare of Easttown is an American crime drama television miniseries created and written by Brad Ingelsby for HBO. Directed by Craig Zobel, the series premiered on April 18, 2021, and concluded on May 30, 2021, consisting of seven episodes. It stars Kate Winslet in the title role, who investigates a murder in a small town outside Philadelphia. Julianne Nicholson, Jean Smart, Angourie Rice, Evan Peters, Sosie Bacon, David Denman, Neal Huff, James McArdle, Guy Pearce, Cailee Spaeny, John Douglas Thompson, and Joe Tippett appear in supporting roles.

The series received critical acclaim for its story, characters, acting, and representation of women. It has also been noted for its cast members speaking in a mostly accurate Philadelphia accent, a dialect seldom heard in mainstream media. Mare of Easttown received sixteen nominations at the 73rd Primetime Emmy Awards and won four, including Outstanding Lead Actress for Winslet, Outstanding Supporting Actress for Nicholson, and Outstanding Supporting Actor for Peters.

== Premise ==
In the fictional suburb of Easttown, Pennsylvania (not to be confused with the real Easttown, Pennsylvania, which is also a Philadelphia suburb), police detective Marianne "Mare" Sheehan investigates the recent murder of a teenage mother while trying to keep her own life from falling apart. Mare is a local hero, having scored the winning basket in a high school basketball game that won Easttown its first state championship 25 years earlier. She has also been unable to solve the case of another young girl missing for a year, leading many in the community to doubt her detective skills. Her personal troubles include a divorce, a son lost to suicide, and a custody battle with her son's formerly heroin-addicted girlfriend over Mare's grandson.

== Cast and characters ==
=== Main ===
- Kate Winslet as Marianne "Mare" Sheehan, a detective sergeant in Easttown, Pennsylvania, who is investigating the murder of one young girl and the disappearance of another
- Julianne Nicholson as Lori Ross, Mare's closest friend
- Jean Smart as Helen Fahey, Mare's mother
- Angourie Rice as Siobhán Sheehan, Mare's daughter
- David Denman as Frank Sheehan, a teacher and Mare's ex-husband
- Neal Huff as Father Dan Hastings, Mare's cousin, a Catholic priest and the pastor of St. Michael's Church
- Guy Pearce as Richard Ryan, an author and creative writing professor
- Cailee Spaeny as Erin McMenamin, a teenage single mother who is treated badly by her ex-boyfriend
- John Douglas Thompson as Chief Carter, Mare's boss at the police department
- Joe Tippett as John Ross, Lori's husband and cousin of Erin's father Kenny
- Evan Peters as Detective Colin Zabel, the county detective called in to assist Mare
- Sosie Bacon as Carrie Layden, the mother of Mare's grandson Drew and ex-girlfriend of Mare's deceased son Kevin
- James McArdle as Deacon Mark Burton, a Catholic deacon reassigned to St. Michael's after sexual misconduct allegations at his previous parish

=== Supporting ===
- Kate Arrington as Faye, Frank's fiancée
- Ruby Cruz as Jess Riley, Erin's best friend
- Ned Eisenberg as Detective Hauser, a county detective
- Enid Graham as Dawn Bailey, an Easttown resident whose daughter, Katie, has been missing for over a year
- Deborah Hedwall as Judy Zabel, Colin's mother with whom he lives
- Caitlin Houlahan as Katie Bailey, a girl who went missing from Easttown a year prior
- Cameron Mann as Ryan Ross, Lori and John's son
- Jack Mulhern as Dylan Hinchey, Erin's ex-boyfriend
- Patrick Murney as Kenny McMenamin, Erin's father
- Chinasa Ogbuagu as Beth Hanlon, Freddie's sister and Mare and Dawn's close friend
- Phyllis Somerville as Betty Carroll, an elderly Easttown resident; this was Somerville's final role before her death in 2020
- Robbie Tann as Billy Ross, John's brother, Lori's brother-in-law and Kenny's cousin
- Madeline Weinstein as Becca, Siobhán's stoner girlfriend

=== Other ===
- Rosa Arredondo as Tammy, a former sex worker and friend of Mare's who works as an informant for her
- Debbie Campbell as Katherine Hinchey, Dylan's mother
- Gordon Clapp as Pat Ross, John and Billy's father
- Eisa Davis as Gayle Graham, Mare's therapist
- Sasha Frolova as Missy Sager, an escort
- Jeremy Gabriel as Steve Hinchey, Dylan's father
- Connie Giordano as Patty Del Rasso, Brianna's mother
- Justin Hurtt-Dunkley as Officer Trammel
- Dominique Johnson as Freddie Hanlon, Beth's opioid-addicted brother
- Izzy King as Drew Sheehan, Mare's grandson, born to her son Kevin and his girlfriend Carrie Layden
- Cody Kostro as Kevin Sheehan, Mare's late son who died by suicide prior to the events of the series
- Jeb Kreager as Wayne Potts, a resident of Easttown
- Katie Kreisler as Trish Riley, Jess' mother
- Mackenzie Lansing as Brianna Del Rasso, Dylan's girlfriend
- Patrick McDade as Glen Carroll, Betty's husband
- Kiah McKirnan as Anne Harris, a DJ at the Haverford College radio show where Siobhan's band performs
- Patsy Meck as Jan Kelly, an employee at the Easttown police station
- Eric T. Miller as Tony Del Rasso, Brianna's father, a restaurant owner
- Kassie Mundhenk as Moira Ross, Lori and John's daughter, who has Down syndrome
- Anthony Norman as Nathan Forde, a member of Siobhan's band
- Drew Scheid as Geoff Gabeheart, one of Siobhan's friends, drummer in Siobhan's band Androgynous
- Sadat Waddy as Sean, Dylan's friend

== Episodes ==
No.	Title	Directed by	Written by	Original release date	U.S. viewers (millions)
1	"Miss Lady Hawk Herself"	Craig Zobel	Brad Ingelsby	April 18, 2021	0.600
In the small community of Easttown, Pennsylvania, Detective Mare Sheehan is ordered to reopen the year-old investigation into the disappearance of young Katie Bailey when the girl's mother, Dawn, complains on the news about the unsolved case. Adding to Mare's frustrations, her ex-husband Frank is remarrying and has invited Mare's whole family—including her mother Helen, teenage daughter Siobhan, and 4-year-old grandson Drew—to his engagement party on the same night Mare and her high school basketball teammates are being honored on the 25th anniversary of their state championship win. At a bar, Mare meets Richard, an author who has recently moved to the area, and they end up having sex. Meanwhile, Erin McMenamin, a teenage single mother who lives with her alcoholic father Kenny, argues with her baby's father, Dylan, and his new girlfriend Brianna when they come to get the baby for a weekend visit. Erin is later lured into the woods and beaten by Brianna in front of Dylan and other teenagers. Siobhan sees the fight and rescues Erin, who walks away into the woods alone. The next morning, Erin's dead body, nearly naked and with a large head wound, is found in a local creek.
2	"Fathers"	Craig Zobel	Brad Ingelsby	April 25, 2021	0.735
Mare responds to the call about Erin's body. She notifies Kenny; bringing along Kenny's cousins John Ross and Billy Ross, to help control the situation. John is the husband of Mare's close friend, Lori. The angry Kenny immediately blames Dylan. Against Mare's wishes, county detective Colin Zabel, known for recently solving a nearby cold case, is brought in to help investigate both Erin's murder and Katie Bailey's disappearance. Under interrogation, Dylan denies killing Erin, but omits important details of their last encounters. Cellphone video of Brianna's attack on Erin surfaces; Mare publicly arrests Brianna for assault at her family's restaurant. Brianna's upset father Tony begins stalking Mare. Mare and Frank worry that Drew might have inherited the mental illness that caused his father, their son Kevin, to take his own life two years prior. Drew's mother Carrie, a recovering addict, seeks full custody of Drew. Mare accepts Richard's invitation to meet him at a reception in his honor, but their date goes poorly. Erin's best friend Jess tells Lori that Erin had told her Dylan was not the real father of her baby. Jess thinks Frank, who briefly taught Erin in school, is the real father instead. A grieving Kenny abducts and shoots Dylan, leaving him for dead.
3	"Enter Number Two"	Craig Zobel	Brad Ingelsby	May 2, 2021	0.918
In the police station, Kenny confesses to shooting and killing Dylan, unaware that Dylan survived. Frank admits he helped Erin by buying supplies for her baby, but denies having a sexual relationship with her or any involvement in her murder. Mare gathers DNA samples from Frank and Dylan for paternity testing. The medical examiner reports that Erin's finger is missing from a gunshot and that there is no evidence of rape. The finger is later found in a local park, where Mare then finds a bullet, indicating that Erin was killed there and her body subsequently moved. Mare is romantically pursued by Richard and also propositioned by a drunken Zabel, both of whom share stories of their own difficult personal relationships and family dysfunction. Erin's phone records reveal that her last call, made after her fight with Brianna, was to Deacon Mark Burton, who claims to only have provided her with counsel. Unbeknownst to the police, Deacon Mark has Erin's bicycle, which he secretly throws into the river. Desperate to prevent Carrie from gaining custody of Drew, Mare steals heroin from the evidence locker and plants it in Carrie's car. Chief Carter immediately discovers the truth and puts Mare on administrative leave, ordering her to get grief counseling.
4	"Poor Sisyphus"	Craig Zobel	Brad Ingelsby	May 9, 2021	1.049
Zabel becomes lead investigator on the case when Mare is suspended; however, she continues to investigate on her own. Paternity tests show that neither Frank nor Dylan fathered Erin's baby. Another girl, Missy Sager, goes missing. Based on a tip from Jess, Erin's friend, Zabel and Mare search Erin's dresser for clues; Mare finds a heart-shaped necklace engraved with a date, but not the journals they were after. Zabel learns that Deacon Mark was transferred from his previous parish after allegations of inappropriate behavior with an underage girl. Carrie gets Drew for the night, but begrudgingly returns him to Mare when he becomes homesick. After a therapy session, Mare remembers Kevin and Carrie violently abusing her and robbing her for drug money. Siobhan struggles with her own feelings about Kevin and her family. She ends her relationship with Becca and begins a new relationship with Anne, who she met through a gig her band played. Richard and Zabel both ask Mare for a date on the same night. Dawn Bailey receives a call claiming that her daughter Katie is alive, the caller demanding $5,000 for her return. When she goes to meet them, she discovers it is just Freddie Hanlon, a drug-addicted neighbor seeking easy money. Missy Sager is imprisoned in a soundproof room in the attic of a tavern, where she finds Katie Bailey alive and being held captive.
5	"Illusions"	Craig Zobel	Brad Ingelsby	May 16, 2021	1.064
Mare learns that Erin stayed with Billy Ross, her father's cousin, for a couple of months following the death of her mother. Brianna grows suspicious of Dylan, who was absent from their bed for some time on the night of Erin's death. Dylan and his friend meet with Jess to burn Erin's hidden journals, revealing Jess intentionally misled the detectives regarding their whereabouts. Jess secretly keeps a photograph from one of them. Mare goes on a date with Zabel, canceling on Richard, but it sours when she continuously brings up the case. Zabel admits to Mare that he did not really solve the case that made his career, instead, he relied on files obtained from a private investigator who died while working the case. Mare, in turn, reveals to him the reason she is on administrative leave, and the two share a kiss. Deacon Mark confides in Pastor Dan that he drove Erin to the park where she was killed that night at her request, saying she was meeting someone else there. Mare and Zabel interview a young prostitute who narrowly escaped being strangled and kidnapped by a man in a blue van. Using a partial license plate number provided by the girl, Mare and Zabel track down the kidnapper, Wayne Potts. Noticing their unexpected arrival at Potts's house, Katie and Missy bang on a pipe to alert Mare and Zabel to their presence in the attic, causing Potts to shoot and kill Zabel and wound Mare in the arm. An unarmed Mare flees through the house, eventually retrieving Zabel's gun and killing Potts as backup arrives.
6	"Sore Must Be the Storm"	Craig Zobel	Brad Ingelsby	May 23, 2021	1.210
Katie and Missy return home, but Potts had an alibi the night of Erin's murder. With Zabel dead, Chief Carter lifts Mare's suspension and puts her back in charge of Erin's murder investigation. Brianna tells Mare about Dylan's unexplained absence the night of the murder, making Dylan a prime suspect. Mare learns that Erin attended a Ross family reunion at a lake, same as the date engraved on her heart-shaped pendant, and that Erin and her father, Kenny, stayed in the same cabin as Billy. Pop Ross tells his son John that Billy came home covered in blood the night of Erin's murder. John talks to Billy, who tearfully states that he killed Erin. John tells his wife Lori, adding that Billy and Erin had an incestuous relationship that began at the reunion and that Billy fathered Erin's child. John and Billy go on a last fishing trip together; their tackle box contains a gun. Despite John telling Lori to keep it a secret, Lori tells Mare about Billy. Mare calls Chief Carter to let him know she is driving to the fishing spot to arrest Billy for Erin's murder. Jess comes to the police station with her mother to give Chief Carter the photograph she took from Erin's journal. Upon viewing the photo, Chief Carter orders his men to get Mare on the phone.
7	"Sacrament"	Craig Zobel	Brad Ingelsby	May 30, 2021	1.520
The photo shows Erin lying in bed next to a sleeping John. Jess informs Chief Carter that she and Dylan burned the journals to conceal any sensitive information and to ensure Erin's baby stayed with Dylan's parents, as Erin would have wanted. At the fishing location, John aims the gun at Billy, planning to kill him and pin Erin's murder on him, but Mare arrives just in time to stop John. John reveals that he had a relationship with Erin and is the father of her child, explaining that Erin called him away from Frank's engagement party to meet her at the park, where she threatened to shoot herself. He claims he accidentally shot her while they were struggling for the gun, and that he and Billy moved her body into the woods to divert suspicion onto the other kids present that night. John admits he persuaded Lori to lie and tell Mare that Billy was the one who killed Erin. Both John and Billy end up in prison, but Billy is released on bail, and Deacon Mark is set free as well. Carrie, who has relapsed into drug use, goes back to rehab and drops her custody battle, allowing Drew to stay with Mare and her mother. Glen Carroll reflects on his loneliness and mentions to Mare that he had noticed some items missing from his home, including his vintage handgun (the same type that fired the fatal bullet), but he acknowledges it was returned to his shed with two rounds missing. The only other person who had access to the shed was John and Lori's 13-year-old son, Ryan. Ryan admits that he knew about his father's affair with Erin and lured her to the park, intending to use Glen's gun to scare her away from his family. Unfortunately, Ryan accidentally killed her when his intimidation attempt turned into a physical altercation, and his father John and uncle Billy covered it up to protect him. Ryan is sent to juvenile detention, which leads a heartbroken Lori to angrily end her friendship with Mare. Later on, Frank and Faye tie the knot, Siobhan heads off to college, Richard and Mare declare their love for each other, but Richard drives off to Maine to his next one-year college teaching job. Lori and Mare make amends, and Mare finally finds the courage to revisit the attic where Kevin died.

== Production ==
=== Development ===
In January 2019, it was reported that Brad Ingelsby, creator of the show, would write all episodes, with Gavin O'Connor directing. Executive producers include Ingelsby, O'Connor, Kate Winslet, Paul Lee, Mark Roybal, and Gordon Gray. In January 2020, it was announced that Craig Zobel would replace O'Connor as director due to scheduling issues and also serve as executive producer.

To prepare for the role of Colin Zabel, Peters participated in a ride-along with the Marple Township Police Department. He also worked with dialect coach Susanne Sulby on the local accent and used a roughly 20-minute recording of a Delaware County-area resident as a reference, listening to it regularly during production.

Regarding the setting, Ingelsby stated "sort of an amalgam" which he explained "It's Coatesville, it's Aston, it's Drexel Hill." Ingelsby stated that he chose the name Easttown because "it sounded like such a generic town name."

=== Casting ===
It was announced in January 2019 that Kate Winslet had been cast to star in the miniseries. In September 2019, the cast was rounded out with Julianne Nicholson, Jean Smart, Angourie Rice, Evan Peters, Cailee Spaeny and David Denman. John Douglas Thompson, Patrick Murney, Ben Miles, Katie Kreisler, James McArdle, Sosie Bacon, Joe Tippett, Neal Huff were cast in October 2019. In February 2021, it was announced that Guy Pearce joined the cast, replacing Miles in his role. In the same month, Mackenzie Lansing, Kate Arrington, Ruby Cruz, James Easter Bradford, Elisa Davis, Enid Graham, Justin Hurtt-Dunkley, Izzy King, Jack Mulhern, Anthony Norman, Drew Scheid, and Madeline Weinstein were cast.

=== Filming ===
Filming of the show began in the fall of 2019 around suburban Philadelphia and was reported to still be in progress as of March 2020, with plans to continue through April. However, production was shut down early due to the COVID-19 pandemic. In early September 2020, a Philadelphia news station reported that filming was set to resume within the month.

Because the story is set in a fictionalized version of Easttown Township in Chester County, Pennsylvania, where series creator Brad Ingelsby was born (the show moves the location east to Delaware County, which is adjacent to Easttown Township), there were discussions about whether to use the "Delco accent", a version of Philadelphia English common in Delaware County. It was Winslet who insisted that the accent be used, despite being a particularly difficult accent to learn, because she felt the community itself was an important character in the story, and the authentic accent would help emphasize that. "There were a lot of things I could have really leant into that would have made it sound like I was doing something a bit gimmicky and I didn't want that to happen," Winslet said. "So I just had to drill it and drill it and drill it." She claimed that learning the accent was so difficult that it caused her to "throw things". Dialect coach Susanne Sulby assisted the actors.

Filming locations include a train station and high-school gymnasium in Coatesville, Pennsylvania (a city in Chester County), and an American Legion hall in Ogden, a community in Delaware County. Inglesby has said that many of the filming locations were around Aston Township, in Delaware County. Winslet reportedly said that, while filming the show, she became obsessed with Wawa convenience stores. "Wawa was a big part of my life for well over a year," she said. Wawa stores were used as scouting locations for the production's costume designers.

== Release and reception ==
The seven-episode series premiered on April 18, 2021, and concluded on May 30, 2021. It was released on Blu-ray and DVD by Warner Bros. Home Entertainment on September 14, 2021.

=== Critical response ===
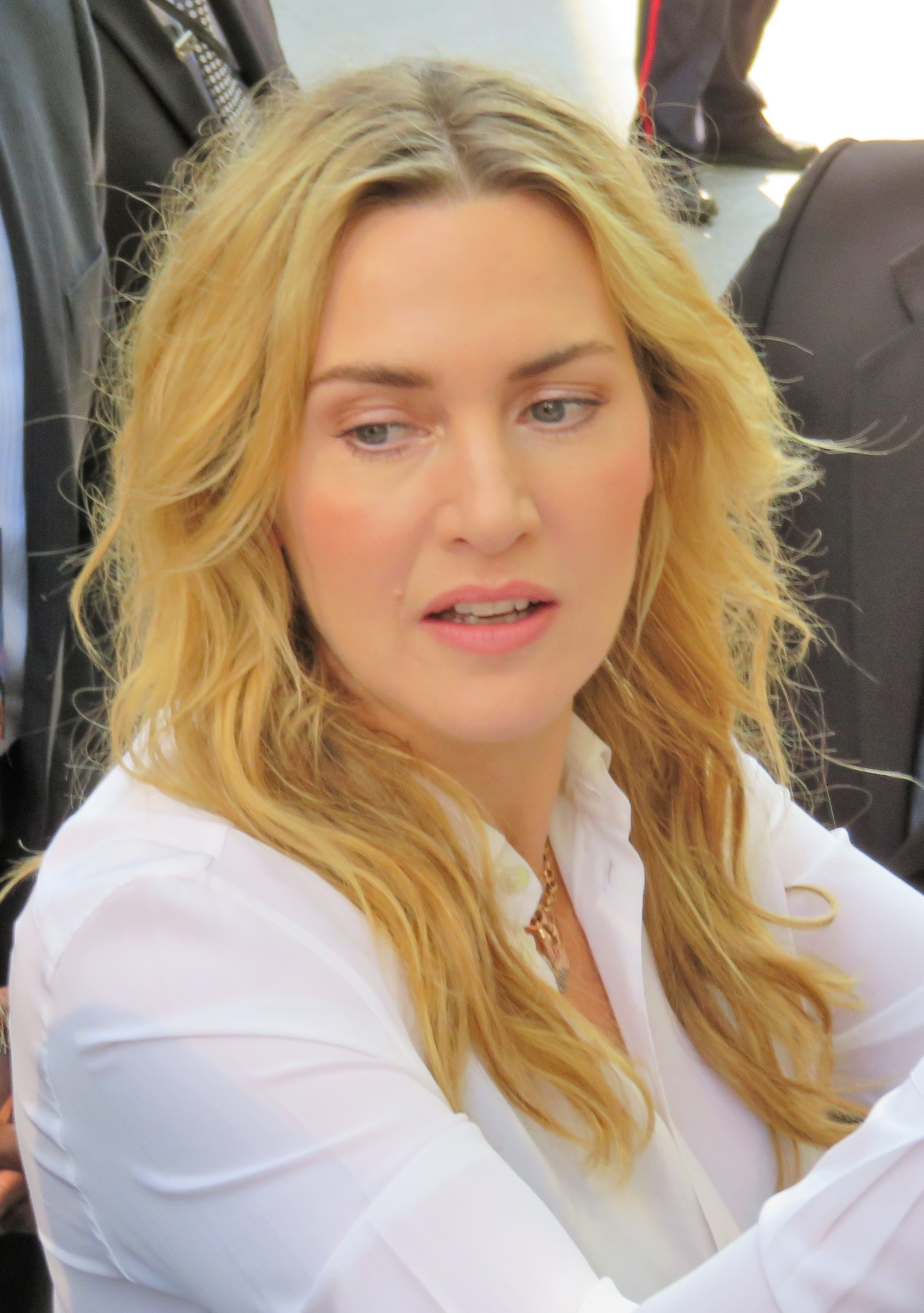
Winslet was praised for her performance, receiving a Primetime Emmy Award, Golden Globe, Critics Choice and SAG Award among others.

Mare of Easttown received critical acclaim. On review aggregator Rotten Tomatoes, the series has an approval rating of 95% based on 128 reviews, with an average rating of 8.1/10. The website's critics consensus reads, "Grounded by a career-best Kate Winslet, Mare of Easttown's ambitions at times exceed its reach, but its central mystery is supported by such strong sense of place and character it hardly matters." On Metacritic, the series has a weighted average score of 81 out of 100 based on reviews from 42 critics, indicating "universal acclaim".

Winslet received widespread praise for her performance, including from Lucy Mangan of The Guardian who wrote, "If you can have a defining performance this late in a career, this is surely Winslet's. She is absolutely wonderful." Alex Abad-Santos of Vox described Winslet's performance as "mesmerizing", adding that "she allows us to see the ugliness Mare is capable of and how obsessive, perhaps even abusive, she can be when she's threatened." The Wall Street Journal's Dorothy Rabinowitz noted "Winslet's eloquent command of the role is obvious from the outset". Ben Travers of IndieWire wrote, "Winslet's immersed performance could carry a far lesser work by itself", while adding that her East American dialect is "convincing and her physical work is flawless." Richard Roeper of the Chicago Sun-Times declared, "Winslet adds to a long list of magnificent, disappear-into-the-character performances...one of the most resonant performances of her career." Caryn James of the BBC wrote, "Winslet makes an unglamorous return to TV...and her fierce, ordinary heroine is gloriously real."

Inkoo Kang of The Hollywood Reporter gave it a mostly positive review describing it as "uneven, but masterfully suspenseful". Kang compared the series with British crime drama Happy Valley, a comparison echoed by Fiona Sturges of The Independent, who wrote that "addiction, abuse and death were woven into the fabric of life" in both dramas, while acknowledging similarities between both shows' protagonists. The New York Times was dismissive in its review, with television critic Mike Hale writing: "Some style in the direction or honest feeling in the screenplay could have mitigated the dreariness, but 'Mare' doesn't offer much beyond Ben Richardson's burnished cinematography." A plot twist in the final episode received lukewarm reviews from various outlets. For The A.V. Club, Joshua Alston wrote, "While [the final episode] is a triumphant conclusion to Mare's emotional arc, as a conclusion to a mystery, it's a mixed bag [...] the whole thing just feels arbitrary and confusing and lacks the emotional logic this show is normally so good at." In Decider, Sean T. Collins agreed but praised the leads' performances, writing, "The resolution of the mystery is a bit 'twists and fake-outs for twists' and fake-outs' sake.' But each new revelation came with an emotionally devastating payload for the characters, with Winslet and Nicholson in particular doing their best work of the series."

Critics and viewers have also particularly praised the series and Winslet for convincingly replicating the Philadelphia regional accent, an oddity in mainstream media. The specific version of the Philadelphia accent is known as the "Delco accent", after Delaware County to the southwest of Philadelphia. The characters' accents, along with their fondness for Wawa, were parodied in a May 2021 Saturday Night Live sketch. In September 2026, a New York Times article ranked Mare of Easttown 65th of 100 best shows of the 21st century.

=== Ratings ===
Mare of Easttown proved to be a record breaking ratings hit. The massive viewership resulted in HBO Max servers crashing shortly after the finale was released on the streaming service.

The final episode of Mare of Easttown drew four million viewers over the holiday weekend across HBO and HBO Max, with nearly three million viewers Sunday night (all platforms), marking a series high for both linear and digital, according to HBO. The finale also set the record as the most watched episode of an original series on HBO Max during its first 24 hours of availability, besting the finales of The Undoing and The Flight Attendant over the same period of time. Mare of Easttown also joined The Undoing as the only series in HBO's history to see consecutive growth week-to-week.

Viewership and ratings per episode of Mare of Easttown
No.	Title	Air date	Rating (18–49)	Viewers (millions)	DVR (18–49)	DVR viewers (millions)	Total (18–49)	Total viewers (millions)
1	"Miss Lady Hawk Herself"	April 18, 2021	0.08	0.600	0.06	0.575	0.14	1.175
2	"Fathers"	April 25, 2021	0.10	0.735	0.07	0.703	0.17	1.438
3	"Enter Number Two"	May 2, 2021	0.12	0.918	0.08	0.773	0.20	1.691
4	"Poor Sisyphus"	May 9, 2021	0.16	1.049	0.10	0.869	0.26	1.918
5	"Illusions"	May 16, 2021	0.15	1.064	0.09	0.922	0.24	1.986
6	"Sore Must Be the Storm"	May 23, 2021	0.22	1.210	—N/a	—N/a	—N/a	—N/a
7	"Sacrament"	May 30, 2021	0.27	1.520	0.08	0.696	0.35	2.215

=== Accolades ===
Year	Award	Category	Nominee(s)	Result	Ref.
2021	Hollywood Critics Association TV Awards	Best Broadcast Network or Cable Limited Series, Anthology Series or Live-Action Television Movie	Mare of Easttown	Won	
2021	Hollywood Critics Association TV Awards	Best Actress in a Limited Series, Anthology Series or Television Movie	Kate Winslet	Nominated	
2021	Hollywood Critics Association TV Awards	Best Supporting Actor in a Limited Series, Anthology Series or Television Movie	Evan Peters	Won	
2021	Hollywood Critics Association TV Awards	Best Supporting Actress in a Limited Series, Anthology Series or Television Movie	Julianne Nicholson	Nominated	
2021	Hollywood Critics Association TV Awards	Best Supporting Actress in a Limited Series, Anthology Series or Television Movie	Jean Smart	Nominated	
2021	Primetime Emmy Awards	Outstanding Limited or Anthology Series	Paul Lee, Mark Roybal, Craig Zobel, Kate Winslet, Brad Ingelsby, Gavin O'Connor, Gordon Gray, Ron Schmidt, and Karen Wacker	Nominated	
2021	Primetime Emmy Awards	Outstanding Lead Actress in a Limited or Anthology Series or Movie	Kate Winslet	Won	
2021	Primetime Emmy Awards	Outstanding Supporting Actor in a Limited or Anthology Series or Movie	Evan Peters (for "Enter Number Two")	Won	
2021	Primetime Emmy Awards	Outstanding Supporting Actress in a Limited or Anthology Series or Movie	Julianne Nicholson (for "Sacrament")	Won	
2021	Primetime Emmy Awards	Outstanding Supporting Actress in a Limited or Anthology Series or Movie	Jean Smart (for "Sacrament")	Nominated	
2021	Primetime Emmy Awards	Outstanding Directing for a Limited or Anthology Series or Movie	Craig Zobel	Nominated	
2021	Primetime Emmy Awards	Outstanding Writing for a Limited or Anthology Series or Movie	Brad Ingelsby	Nominated	
2021	Primetime Creative Arts Emmy Awards	Outstanding Casting for a Limited or Anthology Series or Movie	Avy Kaufman, Diane Heery, and Jason Loftus	Nominated	
2021	Primetime Creative Arts Emmy Awards	Outstanding Cinematography for a Limited or Anthology Series or Movie	Ben Richardson (for "Illusions")	Nominated	
2021	Primetime Creative Arts Emmy Awards	Outstanding Contemporary Costumes	Meghan Kasperlik, Francisco Stoll, Taylor Smith, Laura Downing, and Jennifer Hryniw (for "Miss Lady Hawk Herself")	Nominated	
2021	Primetime Creative Arts Emmy Awards	Outstanding Contemporary Hairstyling	Shunika Terry, Lawrence Davis, Lydia Benaim, and Ivana Primorac (for "Sore Must Be the Storm")	Nominated	
2021	Primetime Creative Arts Emmy Awards	Outstanding Makeup (Non-Prosthetic)	Debi Young, Sandra Linn, Ngozi Olandu Young, and Rachel Geary (for "Sore Must Be the Storm")	Nominated	
2021	Primetime Creative Arts Emmy Awards	Outstanding Single-Camera Picture Editing for a Limited or Anthology Series or Movie	Amy E. Duddleston and Naomi Sunrise Filoramo (for "Fathers")	Nominated	
2021	Primetime Creative Arts Emmy Awards	Outstanding Single-Camera Picture Editing for a Limited or Anthology Series or Movie	Amy E. Duddleston (for "Miss Lady Hawk Herself")	Nominated	
2021	Primetime Creative Arts Emmy Awards	Outstanding Production Design for a Narrative Contemporary Program (One Hour or More)	Keith P. Cunningham, James F. Truesdale, and Edward McLoughlin	Won	
2021	Primetime Creative Arts Emmy Awards	Outstanding Sound Mixing for a Limited or Anthology Series or Movie	Joe DeAngelis, Chris Carpenter, and Richard Bullock (for "Sore Must Be the Storm")	Nominated	
2021	TCA Awards	Program of the Year	Mare of Easttown	Nominated	
2021	TCA Awards	Outstanding Achievement in Movies, Miniseries and Specials	Mare of Easttown	Won	
2021	TCA Awards	Outstanding New Program	Mare of Easttown	Nominated	
2021	TCA Awards	Individual Achievement in Drama	Kate Winslet	Nominated	
2022	Australian Academy of Cinema and Television Arts Awards	Best International Drama Show – Television	Mare of Easttown	Nominated	
2022	Australian Academy of Cinema and Television Arts Awards	Best International Lead Actress in a Show – Television	Kate Winslet	Won	
2022	American Cinema Editors Awards	Best Edited Limited Series	Amy E. Duddleston and Naomi Sunrise Filoramo (for "Fathers")	Nominated	
2022	American Cinema Editors Awards	Best Edited Limited Series	Amy E. Duddleston (for "Illusions")	Won	
2022	American Society of Cinematographers Awards	Outstanding Achievement in Cinematography in Motion Picture, Limited Series, or Pilot Made for Television	Ben Richardson (for "Illusions")	Nominated	
2022	Art Directors Guild Awards	Excellence in Production Design for a Television Movie or Limited Series	Keith P. Cunningham	Nominated	
2022	British Academy Television Awards	Best International Programme	Mare of Easttown	Nominated	
2022	British Academy Television Awards	Best Actress	Kate Winslet	Nominated	
2022	Cinema Audio Society Awards	Outstanding Achievement in Sound Mixing for a Non-Theatrical Motion Pictures or Limited Series	Richard Bullock, Joseph DeAngelis, and Chris Carpenter (for "Sore Must Be the Storm")	Won	
2022	Costume Designers Guild Awards	Excellence in Contemporary Television	Meghan Kasperlik (for "Miss Ladyhawk Herself")	Nominated	
2022	Critics' Choice Awards	Best Television Miniseries	Mare of Easttown	Won	
2022	Critics' Choice Awards	Best Television Movie or Miniseries Actress	Kate Winslet	Won	
2022	Critics' Choice Awards	Best Television Movie or Miniseries Supporting Actor	Evan Peters	Nominated	
2022	Critics' Choice Awards	Best Television Movie or Miniseries Supporting Actress	Julianne Nicholson	Nominated	
2022	Critics' Choice Awards	Best Television Movie or Miniseries Supporting Actress	Jean Smart	Nominated	
2022	Directors Guild of America Awards	Outstanding Directorial Achievement in Miniseries or TV Film	Craig Zobel	Nominated	
2022	Golden Globe Awards	Best Miniseries or Television Film	Mare of Easttown	Nominated	
2022	Golden Globe Awards	Best Actress – Miniseries or Television Film	Kate Winslet	Won	
2022	Golden Reel Awards	Outstanding Achievement in Sound Editing – Limited Series or Anthology	Bradley North, Tiffany S. Griffith, Jordan Wilby, Antony Zeller, Zane Bruce, and Stephanie Lowry (for "Illusions")	Nominated	
2022	Make-Up Artists and Hair Stylists Guild Awards	Best Contemporary Makeup in a Television Series, Limited or Miniseries or Television New Media Series	Debi Young, Ngozi Olandu Young, Sandra Linn, and Rachel Geary	Nominated	
2022	Make-Up Artists and Hair Stylists Guild Awards	Best Contemporary Hair Styling in a Television Series, Limited or Miniseries or Television New Media Series	Lawrence Davis, Shunika Terry, Lydia Benaim, and Ivana Primorac	Nominated	
2022	Producers Guild of America Awards	Outstanding Producer of Limited or Anthology Television Series	Mare of Easttown	Won	
2022	Satellite Awards	Best Miniseries	Mare of Easttown	Won	
2022	Satellite Awards	Best Actress in a Miniseries or Television Film	Kate Winslet	Won	
2022	Satellite Awards	Best Supporting Actor in a Series, Miniseries, or Television Film	Evan Peters	Won	
2022	Satellite Awards	Best Supporting Actress in a Series, Miniseries, or Television Film	Julianne Nicholson	Nominated	
2022	Satellite Awards	Best Supporting Actress in a Series, Miniseries, or Television Film	Jean Smart	Nominated	
2022	Screen Actors Guild Awards	Outstanding Performance by a Male Actor in a Motion Picture Made for Television or Miniseries	Evan Peters	Nominated	
2022	Screen Actors Guild Awards	Outstanding Performance by a Female Actor in a Motion Picture Made for Television or Miniseries	Jean Smart	Nominated	
2022	Screen Actors Guild Awards	Outstanding Performance by a Female Actor in a Motion Picture Made for Television or Miniseries	Kate Winslet	Won	
2022	Screen Actors Guild Awards	Outstanding Performance by Stunt Actors in Television	Mare of Easttown	Nominated	
2022	Writers Guild of America Awards	Outstanding Writing – TV Original Long Form	Brad Ingelsby	Won	

== Future ==
The show was released as a limited series. However, Winslet stated in August 2021 that she "would love to return" as Mare, and that for a potential second season, Ingelsby "has shared some very cool ideas. We will see what happens. I also have to figure out if I can do it. Can I go through it again? It did cost me a lot emotionally to be her, and I have to figure out if I can summon it all up again and do it again."

In November 2024, Ingelsby addressed the speculations of turning Mare into a regular series and the possibility of a second season: "Mare's journey in that show was so emotional... it's hard to come up with an emotional story that could compete with losing a son and having to confront that." He came up with the story for Task, which "felt like it lives in the same world as Mare," though always intended to be a standalone series.

In January 2026, Winslet revealed in an interview with Deadline that there is a "strong likelihood" a second season of Mare of Easttown will be made, with filming potentially taking place in 2027. Although the series was originally conceived as a single-season limited drama, Winslet said renewed discussions had recently occurred among Ingelsby, director Craig Zobel, and HBO. She emphasized that any continuation would depend on the strength of the story due to the demanding nature of the original production, which was filmed during the COVID-19 pandemic.

In July 2026, Nicholson was announced to be reprising her role from Mare of Easttown in the second season of Task, revealing both series to be set in the same shared universe.

== See also ==
- List of Primetime Emmy Awards received by HBO
