= Paul Lee (television executive) =

British director, producer and executive

Paul Lee is a British director, producer and executive. He is currently the CEO of the television and movie studio wiip. He founded the BBC's U.S. cable network BBC America and ran ABC Family, ABC Entertainment and ABC Studios for the Walt Disney Company. During his tenure, Lee is credited with championing racial diversity and changing the face of American television with hit shows including Black-ish, Scandal, How to Get Away with Murder, American Crime, The Goldbergs, Quantico and Fresh Off the Boat.

== Early life ==
Paul Lee was born in London to South African Jewish parents Emanoel Lee and Janine Lee (born Amato) and educated at The Dragon School, Oxford, Winchester College and New College, Oxford.

== Career ==
Lee was a director for the BBC Music and Arts department where he made Primo Levi for Bookmark, and Kalashnikov & Woody Guthrie for the BBC strand Arena. Woody Guthrie helped Arena win the British Academy Television Awards for best series in 1989. Lee was the writer and director of Oblomov (1989) for Arena. It was the first foreign scripted film to be made in the Soviet Union before the collapse of the Berlin Wall. It was filmed entirely on location in Moscow and the sleepy town of Kostroma on the banks of the Volga.

In 1998, Lee was the founder and CEO of the U.S. digital cable network BBC America. He is credited with helping introduce U.S. audiences, U.K. formats such as renovation programming Changing Rooms, reality soaps The Hotel and mockumentaries like The Office. The Office (2013) won the Golden Globe Awards for Best Television series: Musical or Comedy. It was the first British comedy in 25 years to be nominated for a Golden Globe and the first ever to win.

In 2004, Lee was recruited by the Walt Disney Company and named president of ABC Family. Programs like The Secret Life of the American Teenager and Pretty Little Liars helped ABC Family succeed with the coveted 18-34 demographic, knocking MTV out of the top spot.

In 2010, Lee took the helm of the ABC Entertainment Group where he oversaw ABC Entertainment and ABC Studios. Under Lee, ABC became known as a leader for storytelling in the areas of female empowerment and diversity. Lee championed: Scandal (2012) which, led by Kerry Washington was the first U.S. broadcast drama since Get Christie Love! (1974) to feature an African-American female lead; How to Get Away with Murder (2014), which starred Viola Davis, made history when she became the first-ever African-American woman to win an Emmy Award for Best Actress in a Drama Series; Quantico (2015) which, led by Priyanka Chopra, marked the first time a South-Asian female actress headlined a network television series; American anthology crime drama American Crime (2015), created by Academy Awards winner John Ridley presaged the Black Lives Matter movement. During its run, the series received 16 Primetime Emmy Award nominations, honoring Regina King with two consecutive wins for Primetime Emmy Award for Outstanding Supporting Actress in a Limited Series or Movie. The series also received 5 Golden Globe nominations, Screen Actors Guild Awards and Writers Guild of America Awards nominations, in addition to winning three NAACP Image Awards. His TGIT: Thank God It's Thursday block on Thursday night anchored by Shonda Rhimes' Grey's Anatomy, Scandal and How to Get Away with Murder and his Wednesday night comedy block anchored by Modern Family and Black-ish helped elevate ABC to first position in entertainment programming. Additionally, Lee cultivated diverse comedy voices that had not been heard on U.S. broadcast television led by Kenya Barris' Black-ish (2014) and Nahnatchka Khan's Fresh Off The Boat (2015).

In 2016, Lee departed the Walt Disney Company and founded the TV and Movie studio wiip in 2018 backed by Creative Artists Agency. wiip produced Mare of Easttown, starring Kate Winslet for HBO; Dickinson, starring Hailee Steinfeld for Apple TV+; White House Plumbers, starring Woody Harrelson and Justin Theroux for HBO; Danny Boyle's Pistol for FX; Jenny Han's The Summer I Turned Pretty for Amazon and Dummy, starring Anna Kendrick for Roku. The studio also produces Arthur Mathews and Matt Berry's Toast of Tinseltown for the BBC.

wiip was acquired by JTBC Studios (now SLL) in 2021.

== Personal life ==
He is married to Deirdre Lee and has two sons.
