= Patrick Murney =

American actor (born 1987)

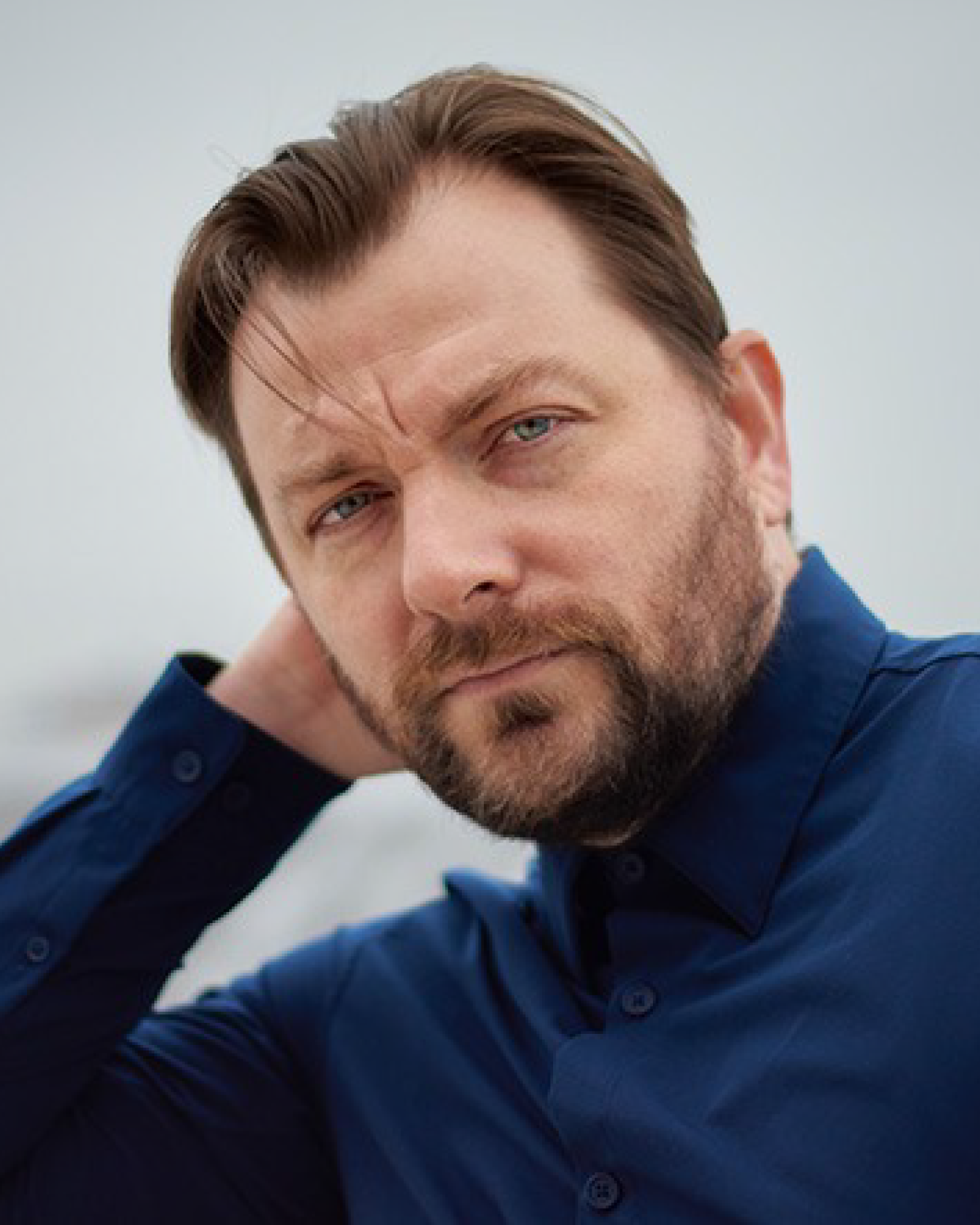
- Murney in 2024
- Born: 1987 (age 38–39); New York, NY, U.S.
- Education: Syracuse University (BFA)
- Father: Christopher Murney
- Relatives: Julia Murney
- Website: https://www.patrickmurneytheactor.com/

Patrick Murney (born 1987) is an American actor known for his recurring roles in Seven Seconds, Mare of Easttown, Law & Order: Organized Crime and others.

== Early life and education ==
Born in New York City in 1987, Murney is the son of the actor Christopher Murney and the brother of the actress Julia Murney. After graduating from the Dwight School in 2005, Murney studied acting at Syracuse University, spending a semester abroad in London and another in Manhattan through the Tepper semester program.

== Career ==
Murney made his first television appearance in the pilot episode of Family Values, which was not selected for a full series order. Murney has since appeared in episodes of Law & Order, Suits, Onion News Network, Public Morals and others.

== Filmography ==
=== Film ===
Year	Title	Role	Notes
2012	King Kelly	Chad	
2013	Bluebird	Wade	
2014	God's Pocket	Skully	
2014	Saint Janet	Kevin	
2015	James White	Bartender	
2016	Goat	Jason	Uncredited
2016	The Passing Season	Eddie	
2016	The Comedian	Prison Guard	
2017	Wonderstruck	Workman	
2017	Staring at the Sun	TJ	
2019	The Irishman	Peggy's Godfather	
2023	The Featherweight	Don Dunphy	
2024	Ride	Tyler	

=== Television ===
Year	Title	Role	Notes
2007	Family Values	Secret Service	Episode: "Pilot"
2010	Law & Order	Dwayne Phillips	Episode: "Rubber Room"
2010	Blue Bloods	James Ratchet	Episode: "Re-Do"
2011	Onion News Network	John Dillow	Episode: "Cyber Attack"
2011	Suits	Young Man	Episode: "Pilot"
2013	Golden Boy	Portis Walker	Episode: "Role Models"
2013	Law & Order: Special Victims Unit	Ralph Priatti	Episode: "Traumatic Wound"
2013	Person of Interest	Tremors	Episode: "Razgovor"
2014	The Money	Trey Archer	Television film
2015	Public Morals	Petey 'Mac' Mackenna	10 episodes
2018	Seven Seconds	Manny Wilcox	10 episodes
2019	FBI	Wayne Rydell	Episode: "The Lives of Others"
2019	Godfather of Harlem	Sergeant Christopher Hollis	2 episodes
2019–2021	Manifest	Cody Webber	3 episodes
2021	Mare of Easttown	Kenny McMenamin	4 episodes
2021	The Blacklist	Graeme Anderson	2 episodes
2022	New Amsterdam	Nico Jerrino	Episode: "The Crossover"
2022	Law & Order: Organized Crime	Scott Parnell	6 episodes
2025	Daredevil: Born Again	Luca	4 episodes

=== Video games ===
Year	Title	Role
2016	Mafia III	Additional voices
2018	Red Dead Redemption 2	Vernon Farley / The Local Pedestrian Population
