= Mackenzie Lansing =

French-American actress

- Born: Villebon-sur-Yvette, France
- Education: American Academy of Dramatic Arts, New York
- Occupation: Actress
- Years active: 2013-present
- Television: Mare of Easttown

Mackenzie Lansing is a French-American television and film actress.

== Early life ==
Lansing grew up in a small town outside of Paris called Villebon-sur-Yvette and was involved in the punk scene as a teenager. Her parents were missionaries and they also spent time in Kinshasa in the Democratic Republic of the Congo.

== Career ==
Lansing moved to New York City, where she attended the American Academy of Dramatic Arts. After that she made appearances on television shows such Murder Castle, Red Oaks, and Tell Me a Story. She worked with Maggie Gyllenhaal in The Deuce. Lansing plays Brianna Delrasso on HBO's limited drama series Mare of Easttown alongside Kate Winslet.

In 2021 Lansing filmed indie drama film Allswell in New York alongside Liza Colón-Zayas, Elizabeth Rodriguez and Daphne Rubin-Vega. In 2022 she was cast in the Hunger Games prequel, The Hunger Games: The Ballad of Songbirds & Snakes. In 2023, she played Harrison in Gareth Edwards science-fiction film The Creator.

== Personal life ==
Lansing has an apartment in Queens, New York. She is a lesbian. At the beginning of her career she has said she was discouraged from speaking publicly about her sexuality and pushed to take roles that made her uncomfortable.

== Filmography ==
Key
†	Denotes works that have not yet been released

Year	Title	Role	Notes
2013	Beautiful	Girl	Short
2014	The Last Day of Summer	Elizabeth	Short
2016	Knights of New Jersey	Hilly	Short
2016	Red Oaks	Claire	1 episode
2017	i-Witness	Cheryl Pierson	1 episode
2017	Murder Castle	Beth Bickford	1 episode
2018	Tell Me A Story	Tisha	1 episode
2019	Premature	Female Student	Film
2019	The Deuce	Jamie	2 episodes
2021	Starstruck	Ellie	Short
2021	Mare of Easttown	Brianna	6 episodes
2022	Allswell in New York	Nina	Film
2023	The Creator	Harrison	Film
2023	The Hunger Games: The Ballad of Songbirds & Snakes	Coral	Film
