= Ben Richardson =

English cinematographer and producer

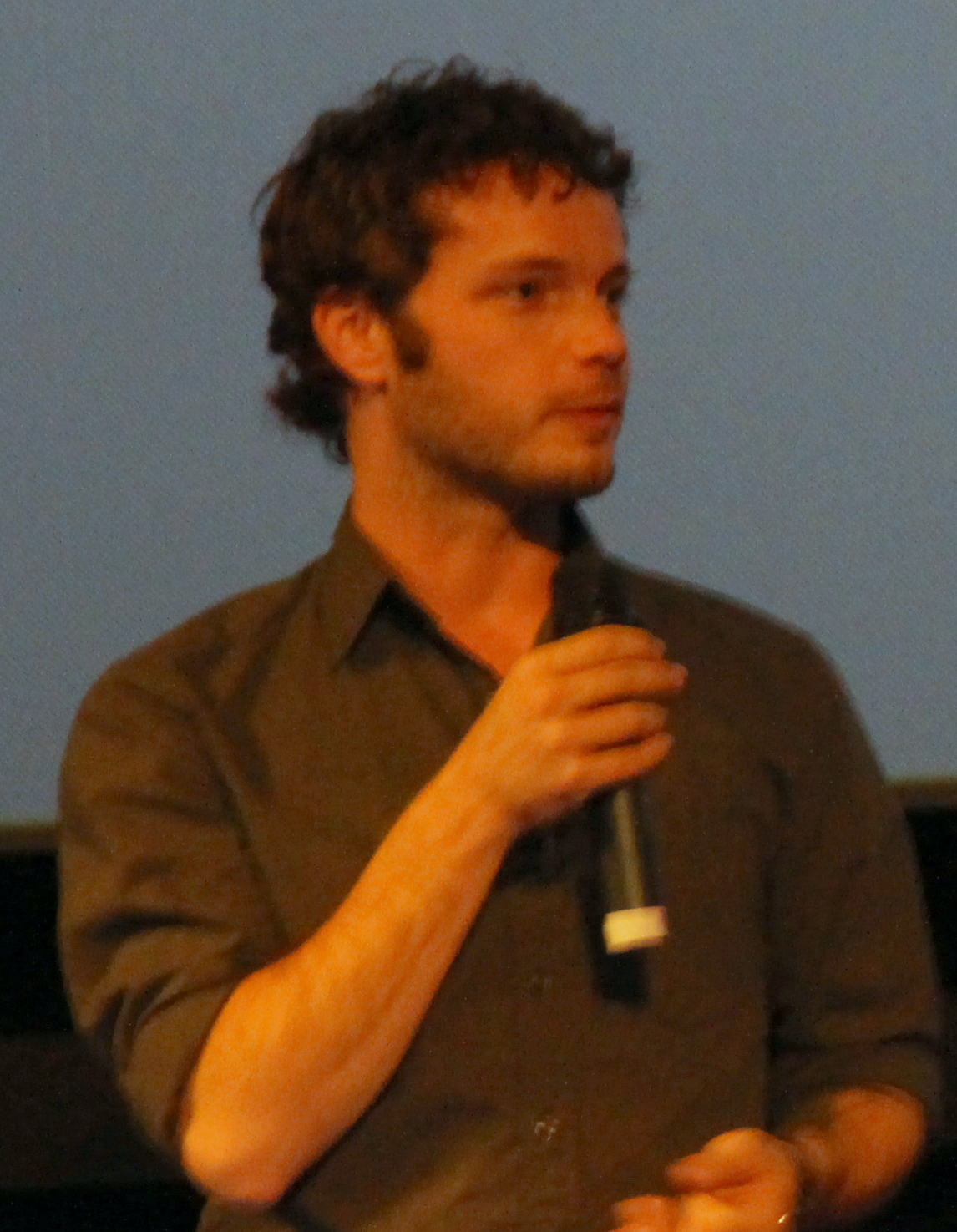
- Richardson in 2013
- Born: Benjamin T. Richardson; September 21, 1975 (age 51); England
- Education: Royal Holloway, University of London
- Occupations: Cinematographer; Television producer; Director
- Years active: 2007–present
- Partner: Anna Kendrick (2014–2020)
- Website: benrichardson.com

Benjamin T. Richardson ASC BSC (born 21 September 1975) is an English cinematographer, television producer and director.

== Early life ==
Richardson was born in England and attended Bournemouth School before enrolling in Royal Holloway, University of London's media arts degree programme.

== Career ==
Richardson is a director of photography. Three of his films have premiered at the Sundance Film Festival: Beasts of the Southern Wild, Happy Christmas, and Wind River. Beasts of the Southern Wild was also nominated for four Academy Awards at the 85th Academy Awards, including a nomination for Best Picture. His short film Seed won Best Animated Short at the 2010 Slamdance Film Festival.

In 2019, Richardson was invited to join the American Society of Cinematographers. In 2025, he became a member of the British Society of Cinematographers.

=== Beasts of the Southern Wild ===
Richardson met director Benh Zeitlin in Prague in 2004 and subsequently collaborated with him on the short film Glory at Sea in 2008. During pre-production on Beasts of the Southern Wild, Richardson shot a test reel which convinced the financiers to approve him as cinematographer for the film.

Beasts of the Southern Wild debuted at the 2012 Sundance Film Festival where Richardson won the Excellence in Cinematography Award. For his work on the film he also won the Independent Spirit Award for Best Cinematography, and was nominated for multiple awards including a Camerimage award and a Satellite Award.

== Personal life ==
Richardson was in a relationship with actress Anna Kendrick between 2014 until 2020; the two met while filming Drinking Buddies.

== Filmography ==
=== Cinematographer ===
Feature film

Year	Title	Director
2012	Beasts of the Southern Wild	Benh Zeitlin
2013	Drinking Buddies	Joe Swanberg
2014	The Fault in Our Stars	Josh Boone
2014	Happy Christmas	Joe Swanberg
2014	Cut Bank	Matt Shakman
2015	Digging for Fire	Joe Swanberg
2017	Wind River	Taylor Sheridan
2017	Table 19	Jeffrey Blitz
2017	Sand Castle	Fernando Coimbra
2017	1922	Zak Hilditch
2021	Those Who Wish Me Dead	Taylor Sheridan

Television

Year	Title	Director	Notes
2018	The Chi	Rick Famuyiwa	Episode "Pilot"
2018	Yellowstone	Taylor Sheridan	Season 1
2021	Mare of Easttown	Craig Zobel	Miniseries
2021	Mayor of Kingstown	Taylor Sheridan	Episodes "The Mayor of Kingstown" and "Simply Murder"
2021–2022	1883	Taylor Sheridan; Himself; Christina Alexandra Voros	6 episodes
2022–2025	1923	Himself; Guy Ferland	13 episodes

=== Director ===
Film

- F.A.S.T. (2027)

Television

Year	Title	Director	Producer	Notes
2019	Yellowstone	Yes	Co-producer	Directed episodes "Resurrection Day" and "Behind Us Only Grey"
2021	Mayor of Kingstown	Yes	Co-executive	Directed episodes "The End Begins" and "The Price"
2021–2022	1883	Yes	Co-executive	Directed 5 episodes
2022	Tulsa King	Yes	No	Episode "Caprice"
2022–2025	1923	Yes	Executive	Directed 13 episodes

== Awards and nominations ==
Year	Award	Nomination	Title	Result
2012	Independent Spirit Awards	Best Cinematography	Beasts of the Southern Wild	Won
2012	Satellite Awards	Best Cinematography	Beasts of the Southern Wild	Nominated
2018	American Society of Cinematographers	Outstanding Achievement in Cinematography (For episode "Daybreak")	Yellowstone	Nominated
2021	Primetime Emmy Awards	Outstanding Cinematography (For Episode "Illusions")	Mare of Easttown	Nominated
