= Craig Zobel =

American filmmaker and actor

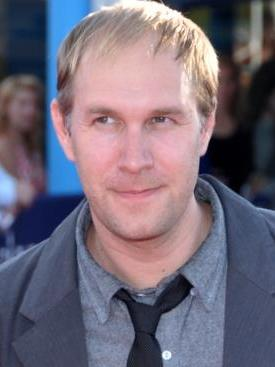
- Zobel at the 2012 Deauville American Film Festival
- Born: Roger Craig Zobel; New York City, New York, U.S.
- Education: North Carolina School of the Arts
- Occupations: Director; producer; screenwriter; actor
- Years active: 2000–present

Roger Craig Zobel is an American filmmaker and actor whose work includes music videos, film, and television. He has directed the films Compliance (2012), Z for Zachariah (2015), and The Hunt (2020). On TV he has directed episodes of The Leftovers, American Gods, and Westworld. In 2021, he directed the miniseries Mare of Easttown on HBO. He also helped to co-create the online animated series Homestar Runner with Mike and Matt Chapman, known collectively as The Brothers Chaps.

== Early life ==
Zobel was born in New York and grew up in Atlanta, Georgia, later studying film at the North Carolina School of the Arts alongside David Gordon Green and other future collaborators.

== Career ==
After graduation, Zobel worked on David Gordon Green's first three films — George Washington (2000), All the Real Girls, (2003) and Undertow (2003), as either co-producer, production manager or second unit director. He also directed The Hunt (2020).

In 2021 he reupped his deal with HBO for an additional three years.

=== Homestar Runner ===
Homestar Runner is an animated internet cartoon. The series originated with The Homestar Runner Enters the Strongest Man in the World Contest, a small self-published book co-created by Zobel and Mike Chapman. On a day off while Zobel and Chapman were working summer jobs surrounding the 1996 Summer Olympics, a visit to a bookstore prompted them to parody the state of children's books. A few years later, Mike and his brother Matt adapted the setting and characters into an animated Flash web series, which Zobel has occasionally contributed to.

=== Film career ===
Zobel has directed, written, and produced several films, including Great World of Sound and Compliance. In August 2019, the release of Zobel's horror thriller film The Hunt was postponed by distributor Universal in response to the 2019 El Paso shooting, with the studio cancelling the film's original September 27, 2019, date, and moving it to March 13, 2020. In October 2026, it was announced that Zobel had been hired to direct a live-action film adaptation of the comic Something Is Killing the Children by for Blumhouse Productions.

== Filmography ==
Film

Year	Title	Director	Producer	Writer
2001	A Letter from My Father	Yes	No	No
2007	Great World of Sound	Yes	Yes	Yes
2012	Compliance	Yes	Yes	Yes
2014	Prince Avalanche	No	Yes	No
2015	Z for Zachariah	Yes	No	No
2020	The Hunt	Yes	No	No

Television

Year	Title	Director	Executive producer	Notes
2015–2017	The Leftovers	Yes	No	Episodes: "Lens", "International Assassin", "The Most Powerful Man in the World (and His Identical Twin Brother)"
2016	Outcast	Yes	No	Episodes: "The Road Before Us"
2017	American Gods	Yes	No	Episodes: "Git Gone"
2018	Westworld	Yes	No	Episodes: "Akane no Mai"
2018	One Dollar	Yes	Yes	10 episodes
2021	Mare of Easttown	Yes	Yes	7 episodes
2024	The Penguin	Yes	Yes	3 episodes
