= Matthew Gentile =

Italian-American Filmmaker

Matthew Gentile is an Italian-American filmmaker. His feature film directorial debut American Murderer premiered at the Taormina Film Festival. Gentile has also directed several short films, including Frontman (2016), which won several awards, including the Student Emmy for Best Directing from the Television Academy of Arts and Sciences, and Lawman (2017) which won the Dolby + Vizio Vision Award at AFI Fest.

== Early life ==
Gentile was born in New York City and graduated from Connecticut College before graduating from the American Film Institute in 2015.

== Career ==
During the height of the pandemic, Gentile shot his feature debut, the true crime hit American Murderer, with a cast led by Tom Pelphrey, Ryan Phillippe, Idina Menzel, and Jacki Weaver.

After its premiere at Taormina and winning a number of awards on the festival circuit, Lionsgate/Saban and Universal acquired the film for worldwide distribution. Upon its limited theatrical release, it received positive reviews from critics, and became a global streaming success, topping charts in over 45 countries, including the top 10 on Hulu.

Gentile's next announced film will be a true crime film entitled Judgment Ridge, about the 2001 Dartmouth College murders. Based on the book of the same name by Mitchell Zuckoff and Dick Lehr, it will be produced by Steven & Randy Toll and Gentile will direct from his own script.

== Personal life ==
Gentile is married to writer Bianca Vera, whom he met in college and collaborates with. They live in Los Angeles with their chihuahua mix, Selena.

== Filmography ==
- Frontman (2016, short film)
- Lawman (2017; short film)
- American Murderer (2019; short film/proof of concept)
- American Murderer (2022; feature debut)
