= Jason Derek Brown =

American fugitive (born 1969)

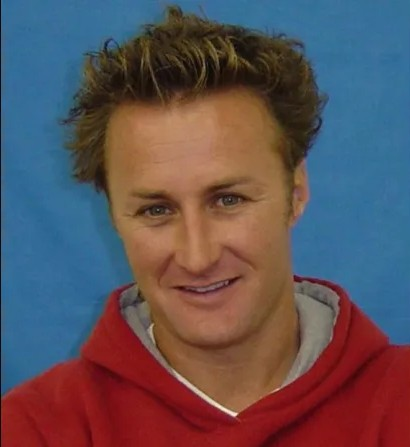
- Photograph of Brown taken in 2004

FBI Ten Most Wanted Fugitive
- Charges: Unlawful Flight to Avoid Prosecution; First degree murder; Armed robbery
- Reward: $200,000
- Alias: Derek Brown; Greg Johnson; Harline Johnson; Greg Harline Johnson; John Brown; Jay Brown

Description
- Born: July 1, 1969 (age 57); Los Angeles, California, U.S.
- Disappeared: December 6, 2004; Orange County, California, U.S.
- Height: 5 ft 10 in (178 cm)
- Weight: 180 lb (82 kg)
- Occupation: Ring salesman, toy salesman, golf equipment importer

Status
- Added: December 8, 2007
- Removed: September 7, 2022
- Number: 489
- Removed from Top Ten Fugitive List

Jason Derek Brown (born July 1, 1969) is an American fugitive wanted for first degree murder and armed robbery in Phoenix, Arizona. On November 29, 2004, Brown allegedly shot and killed Robert Keith Palomares, a 24-year-old armored car guard outside a movie theater and then fled with stolen money. On December 8, 2007, he was named by the FBI as the 489th fugitive to be placed on its Ten Most Wanted list. He is considered armed and extremely dangerous. On September 7, 2022, he was removed from the Ten Most Wanted list. He was replaced on the list by Michael James Pratt. Despite his removal from the Top Ten List, Brown remains a wanted fugitive. In 2022, a theatrical film about Brown's life was made, titled American Murderer, starring Tom Pelphrey (as Brown), Ryan Phillippe, Idina Menzel, and Jacki Weaver.

== Background ==
Brown was born in Los Angeles, California, on July 1, 1969, to David John Brown Sr. He attended Laguna Beach High School. Brown speaks fluent French and has a master's degree in international business. He served a mission for the Church of Jesus Christ of Latter-day Saints in Paris from 1988 to 1990 but was eventually excommunicated from the church.

Between 1990 and 2004, Brown resided at several places in Orange County, California, including Dana Point and the Corona del Mar neighborhood of Newport Beach.

=== Motive ===
Brown owned two businesses, Toys Unlimited and On the Doorstep Advertising, both of which he ran out of his home in Salt Lake City, Utah. He had been employed as a toy salesman and golf equipment importer to support his luxurious lifestyle and expensive tastes in such things as cars, motorbikes, and boats. Brown portrayed himself as a wealthy man despite the fact that by 2004 he had defaulted on at least one large loan and racked up tens of thousands of dollars in debt. It is believed that Brown operated check and bank fraud scams for years to fund the image he created for himself. Phoenix detective Paul Brown stated that Brown may have perpetrated several unsolved petty thefts and home invasions. He would sometimes go to car dealerships, clean shaven and well-dressed, and purchase a car using a false Social Security number and address.

=== Means ===
In November 2004, days after buying a .45-caliber Glock pistol, Brown took a firearms instruction course at Totally Awesome Guns and Range in Salt Lake City. He had passed a background check and submitted his fingerprints, which were sent to state and federal authorities. Brown's instructor, Clark Aposhian, described him as an "obnoxious student" and inexperienced with firearms. During a practice shooting days before the murder, Brown accidentally fired a round into a truck, for which he later paid its owner approximately $1,300 in damages. At this time, Brown was living in an Ahwatukee, Arizona, hotel. He was captured on surveillance tape having a conversation with another man in the hotel lobby. The man is considered a possible accomplice or witness; however, his identity remains unknown.

== Robbery and murder ==
On November 29, 2004, Robert Keith Palomares, a 24-year-old armored car guard, was carrying weekend deposits outside an AMC theater at 4915 E. Ray Road in Phoenix. At approximately 10:00 a.m., a hooded gunman ambushed and shot Palomares with a .45-caliber semiautomatic Glock. Five of six bullets fired struck Palomares in the head. Although armed, Palomares had no time to defend himself. The gunman took a moneybag containing $56,000 in cash, ran into a nearby alley, and fled the scene on a bicycle. Palomares was transported to Good Samaritan Hospital, where he was pronounced dead. Witnesses initially described the shooter as being anywhere from 25 to 30 years old and Hispanic. Authorities recovered the bicycle and lifted fingerprints from it that linked Brown to the murder. Accordingly, he was soon considered the prime suspect in the case, and an arrest warrant was issued on December 4 by Maricopa County Superior Court, charging Brown with first degree murder and armed robbery. Brown was later also charged with unlawful flight to avoid prosecution in a federal arrest warrant issued on December 6 by the United States District Court for the District of Arizona. Investigators have considered Brown's desperate financial situation as a possible motive.

== Fugitive ==
Authorities soon identified Brown as a suspect, but he had already left Arizona for Henderson, Nevada. He continued on to Las Vegas, where he swapped his BMW M3 for a black Cadillac Escalade he had in storage. He then drove to Orange County, California, where he stayed with some relatives. On December 6, 2004, with the FBI having tracked him to the relatives' residence, an arrest warrant was issued. However, that same day, senior management at the Phoenix PD felt that they needed to show the local population that they were not inept and were making progress on the high profile crime and – counter to its own detectives' views, who felt that they and the FBI had nearly cleared the case – held a press conference announcing Brown as the suspect. This alerted Brown that law enforcement was pursuing him, and he fled no more than one hour before the FBI arrived to execute its arrest warrant.

Brown apparently used his credit card at a gas station in southern Orange County and traveled to San Diego near the Mexican border and then to Portland, Oregon. After this, the FBI states that Brown became a "ghost", going completely off the grid.

On January 16, 2005, authorities discovered his abandoned Cadillac in a long-term parking lot at the Portland International Airport. While in Portland, Brown mailed a package with clothes and golf equipment to his older brother, David John Brown II of San Diego, who had a previous criminal record and hid behind three aliases. On April 20, 2005, David was indicted for obstruction of justice. The indictment claimed that he tampered with evidence when he deep-cleaned his brother's BMW in early December, after having driven the vehicle to California from a Las Vegas storage facility. The FBI had asked him whether he knew of any storage lockers that his younger brother had in Las Vegas; David attested that he did not, but prosecutors showed that he did. David pled guilty in 2007 to lying to the FBI, and a federal judge in Arizona sentenced him to just three years of probation.

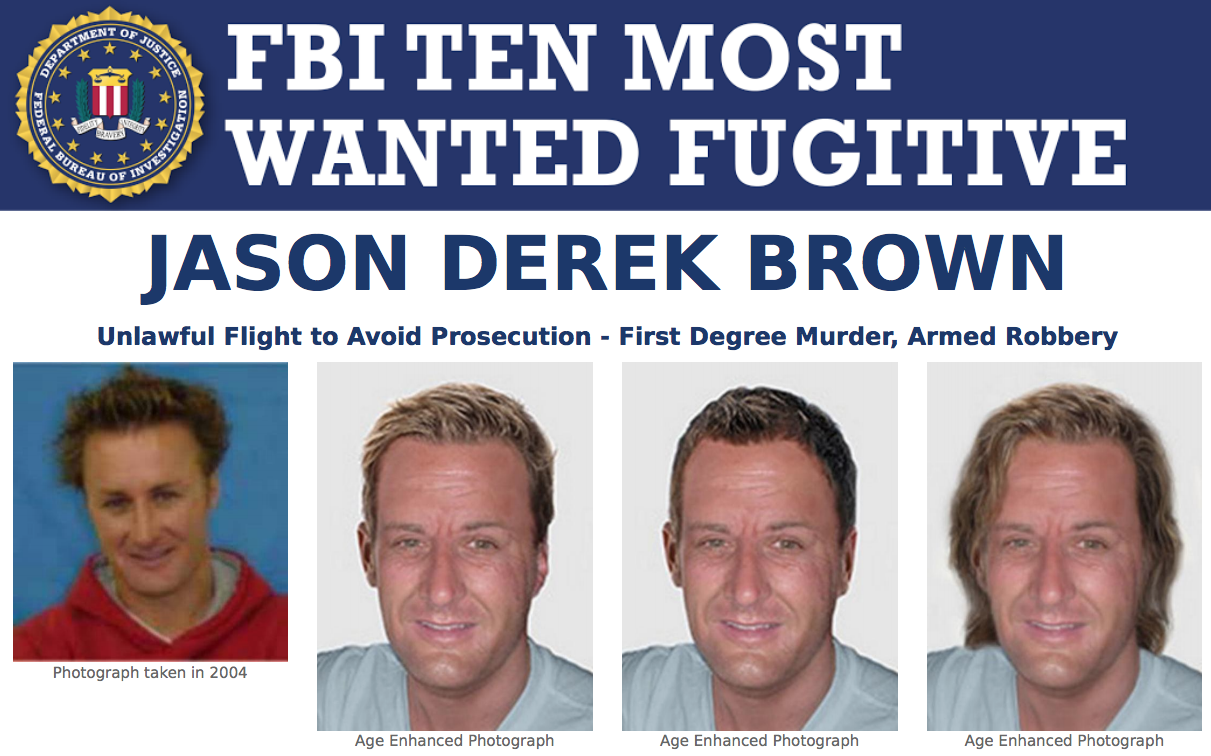
An FBI Ten Most Wanted Fugitive poster of Brown

By 2005 the FBI received over 200 leads in the case. Most were from outside Arizona, and dozens came from outside the United States, including possible sightings in Canada. Because of Brown's "California surfer dude" appearance and ability to blend into crowds, the FBI has had more leads on Brown than on anyone else on its Ten Most Wanted list, and most of them proved to be false leads. Reporters noted Brown's striking resemblance to actor Sean Penn; one of Penn's body doubles was once arrested by authorities when they mistook him for Brown.

On December 8, 2007, Brown was named by the FBI as the 489th fugitive to be placed on its Ten Most Wanted list. The FBI offered a reward of up to $200,000 for information leading to his capture (the reward was doubled on March 25, 2013). The most recent disclosed credible sighting came in August 2008, near the Hogle Zoo in Salt Lake City. An acquaintance of Brown, someone who went to missionary training with him and accompanied him on his mission to France, recognized him when they were both stopped at a traffic light. Upon their mutual recognition, Brown promptly accelerated through the stoplight and sped away. The witness shared his sighting with the authorities. According to him, Brown had a deeper tan and had longer hair compared to the 2004 photograph on his wanted poster. Brown had previously lived in Salt Lake City and was known to have contacts in the area. Juan Becerra, an FBI special agent in Salt Lake City, suggested that Brown was in Salt Lake City to visit people he knew. "It's very hard for individuals to change the way they live, the way they behave," Becerra said. "This is a guy who stays in shape, likes fitness, likes to look good. We're hoping he's ... been seen at a nightclub or fitness club." He stated that Brown was comfortable outdoors, which may have been another reason for wanting to live in Salt Lake City.

Investigators believe that Brown may be hiding in plain sight in the Mormon community under an assumed identity, living with a partner who might not know his real identity, or may have fled the country to live in France, Quebec (Canada) or Thailand.

=== In the media ===
Brown's story has been covered extensively in the media on shows such as Dateline and American Greed. This story also inspired writer and director Matthew Gentile with his feature film debut, American Murderer, which was released theatrically in 2022 by Lionsgate and Universal and starred Tom Pelphrey, Ryan Phillippe, Idina Menzel, and Jacki Weaver. The film received positive reviews (with praise aimed towards Pelphrey's performance) and topped streaming charts in 45+ countries worldwide.

A documentary about the killing of Palomares, The Coward, was released in September 2026.

== See also ==
- List of fugitives from justice who disappeared
