= Critics' Choice Television Award for Best Supporting Actor in a Drama Series =

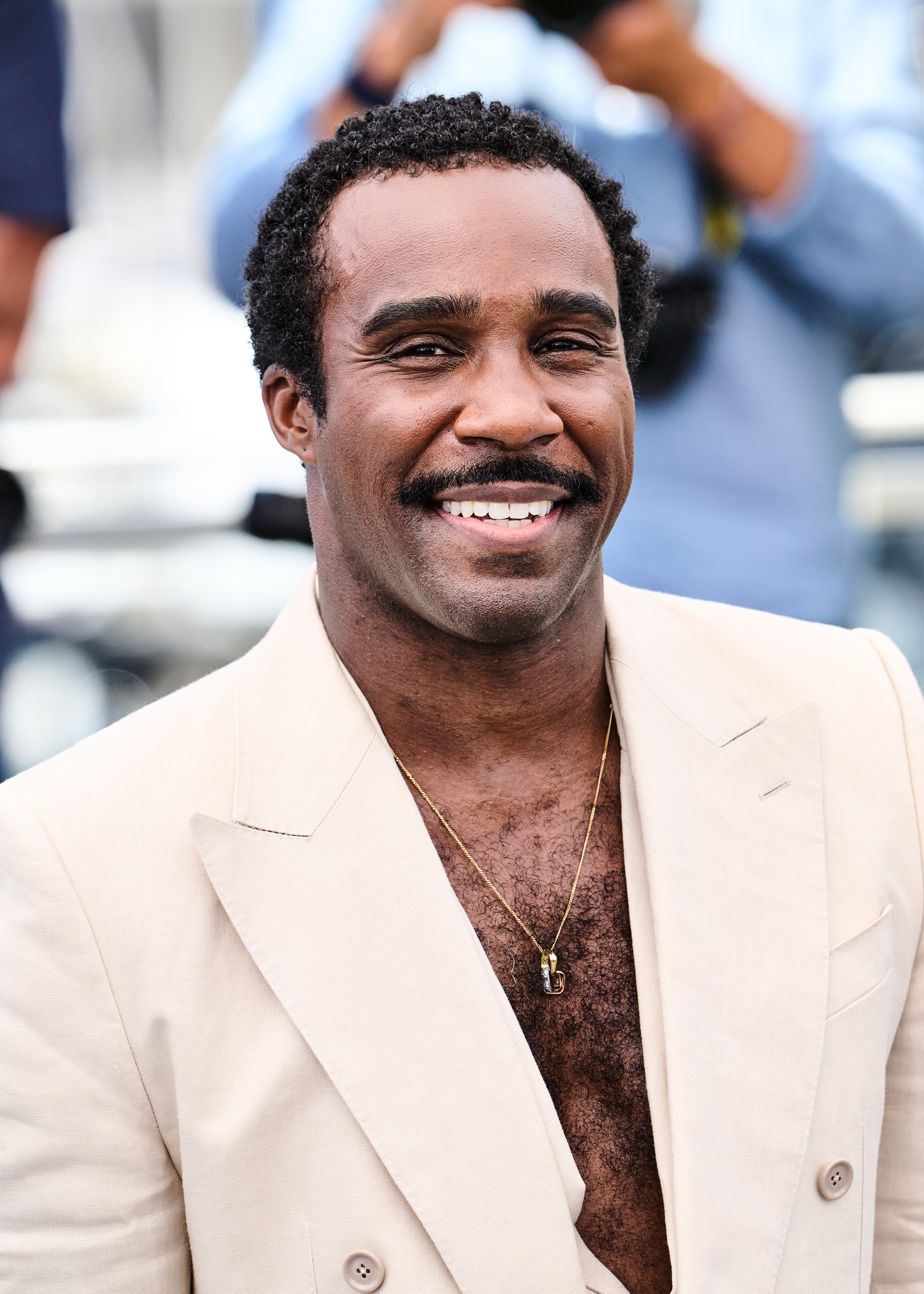
- The 2026 recipient: Tramell Tillman
- Country: United States
- Presented by: Critics Choice Association
- First award: 2011
- Currently held by: Tramell Tillman – Severance (2025)
- Website: criticschoice.com

The Critics' Choice Television Award for Best Supporting Actor in a Drama Series is one of the award categories presented annually by the Critics' Choice Television Awards (BTJA) to recognize the work done by television actors.

It was introduced in 2011 when the event was first initiated. The winners are selected by a group of television critics that are part of the Broadcast Television Critics Association.

Both Billy Crudup and Giancarlo Esposito hold the record with most wins in this category with two each.

== Winners and nominees ==
indicates the winner

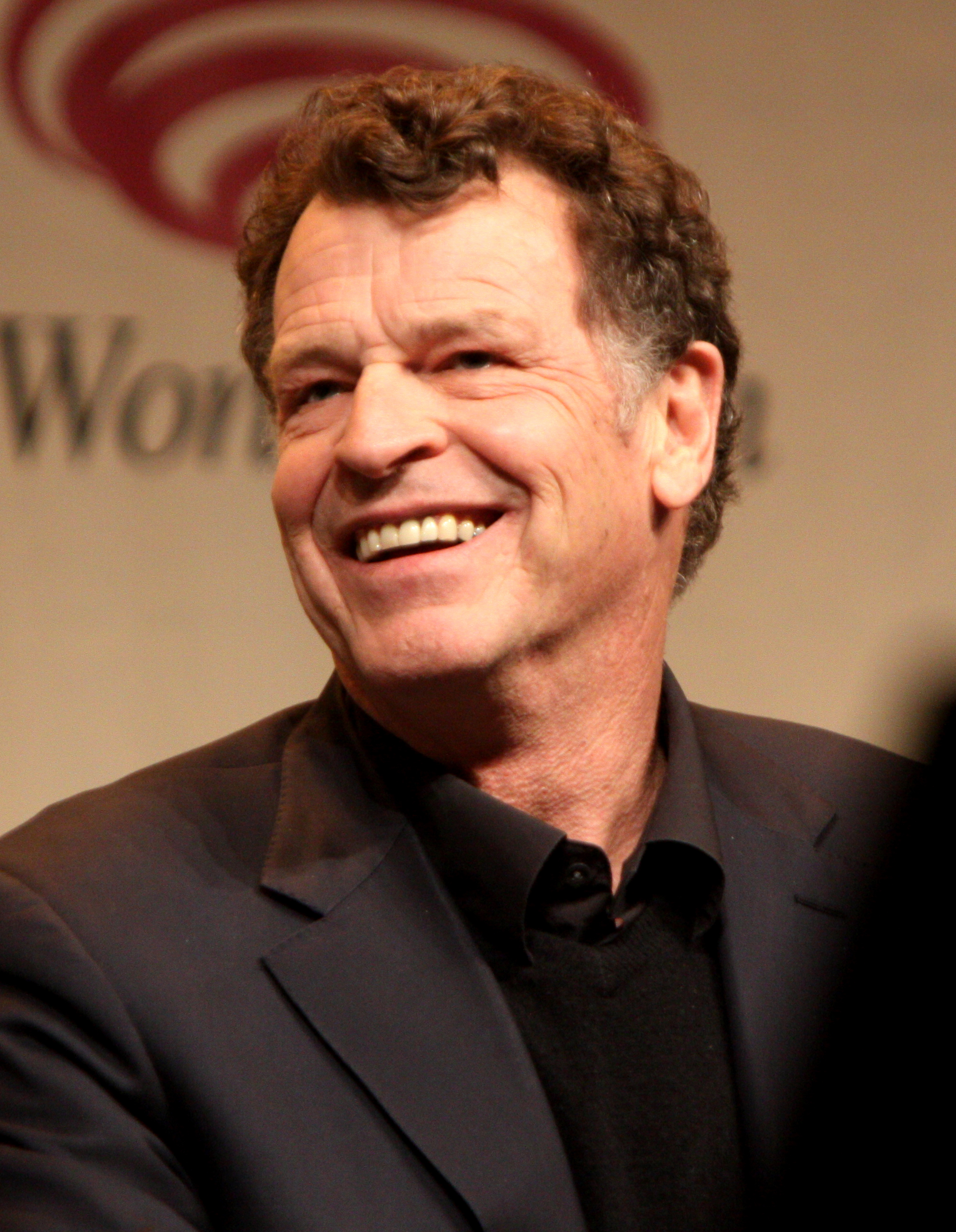
John Noble won for Fringe (2011)

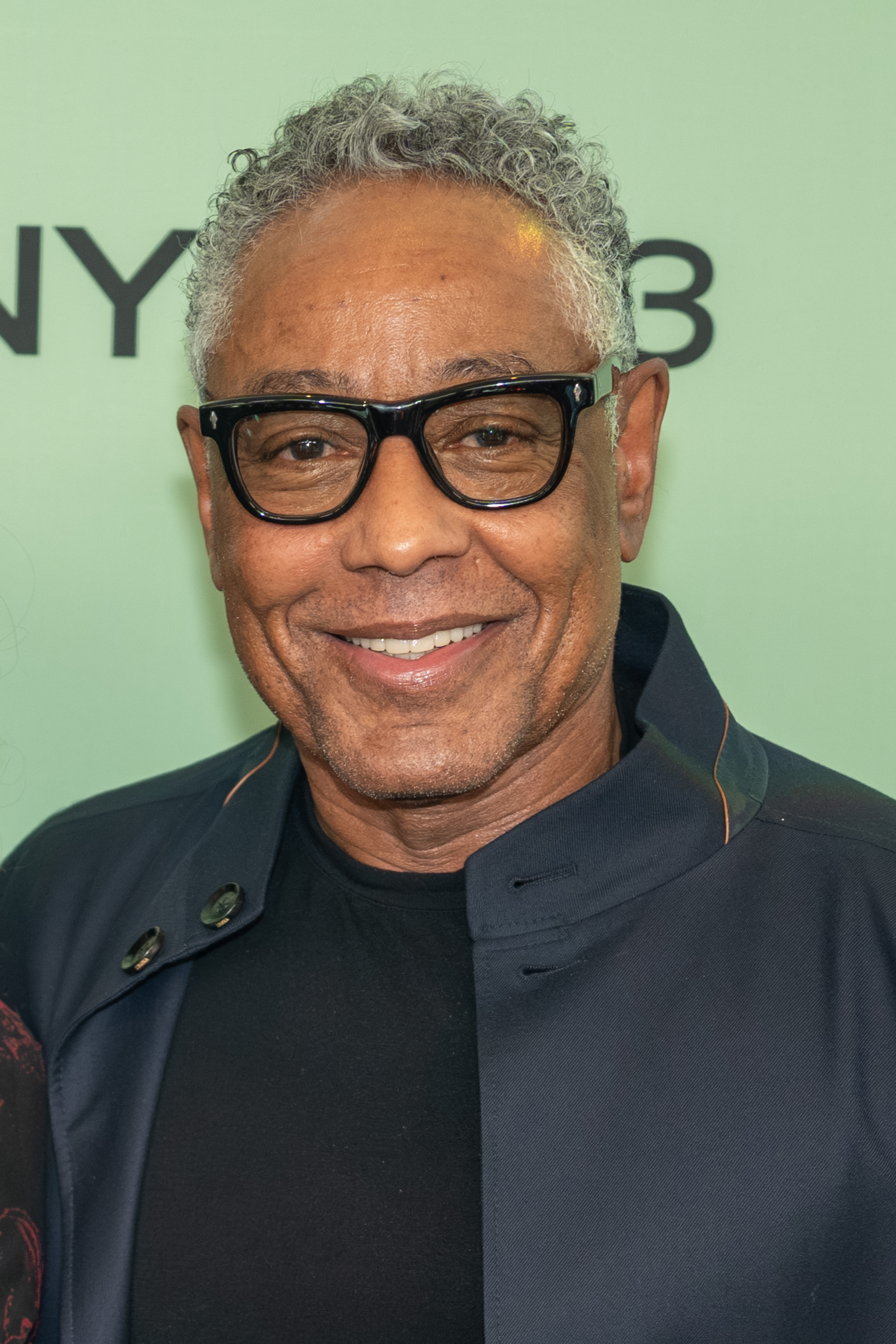
Giancarlo Esposito won twice for Breaking Bad (2012) and Better Call Saul (2023)

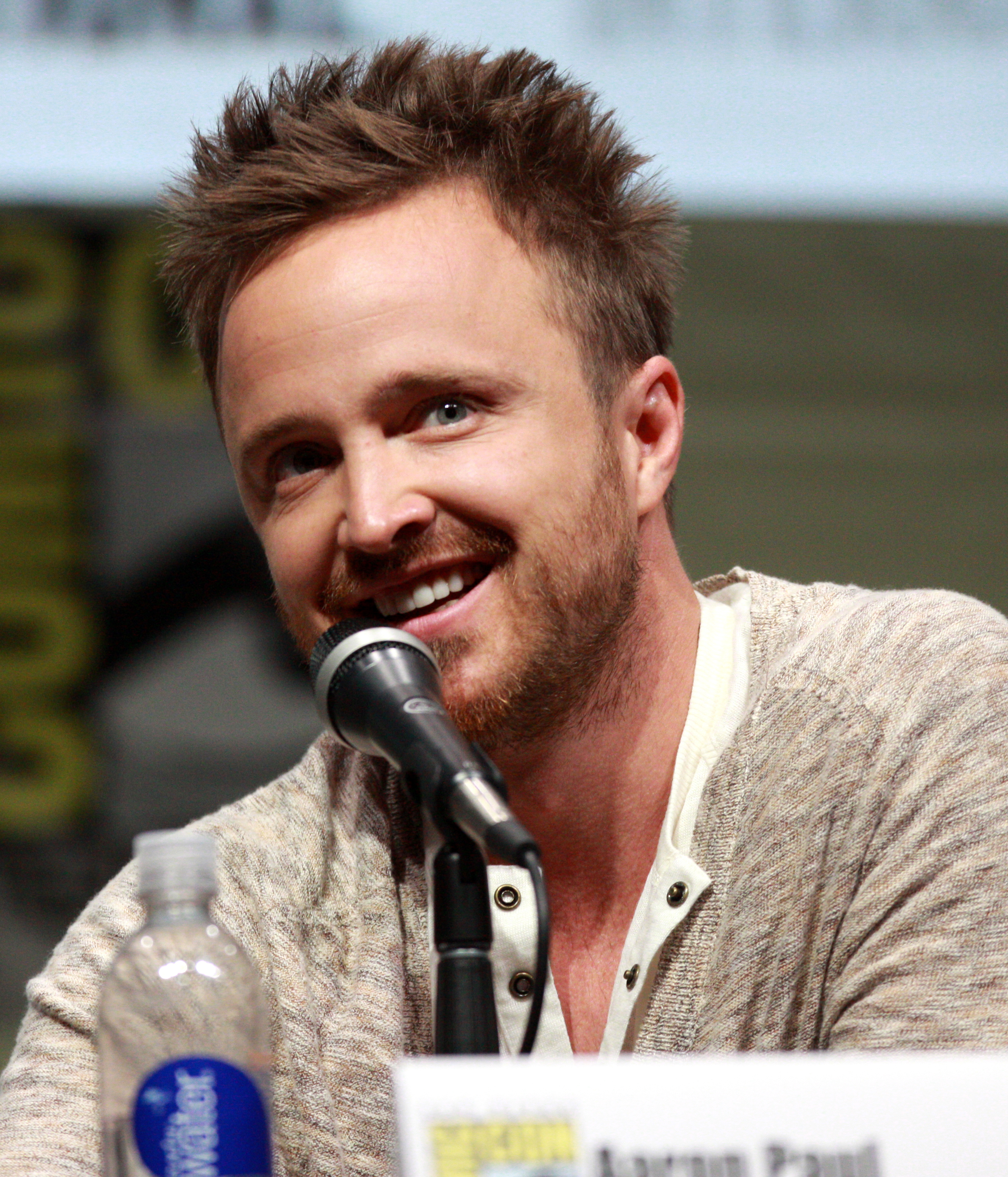
Aaron Paul won for Breaking Bad (2014)

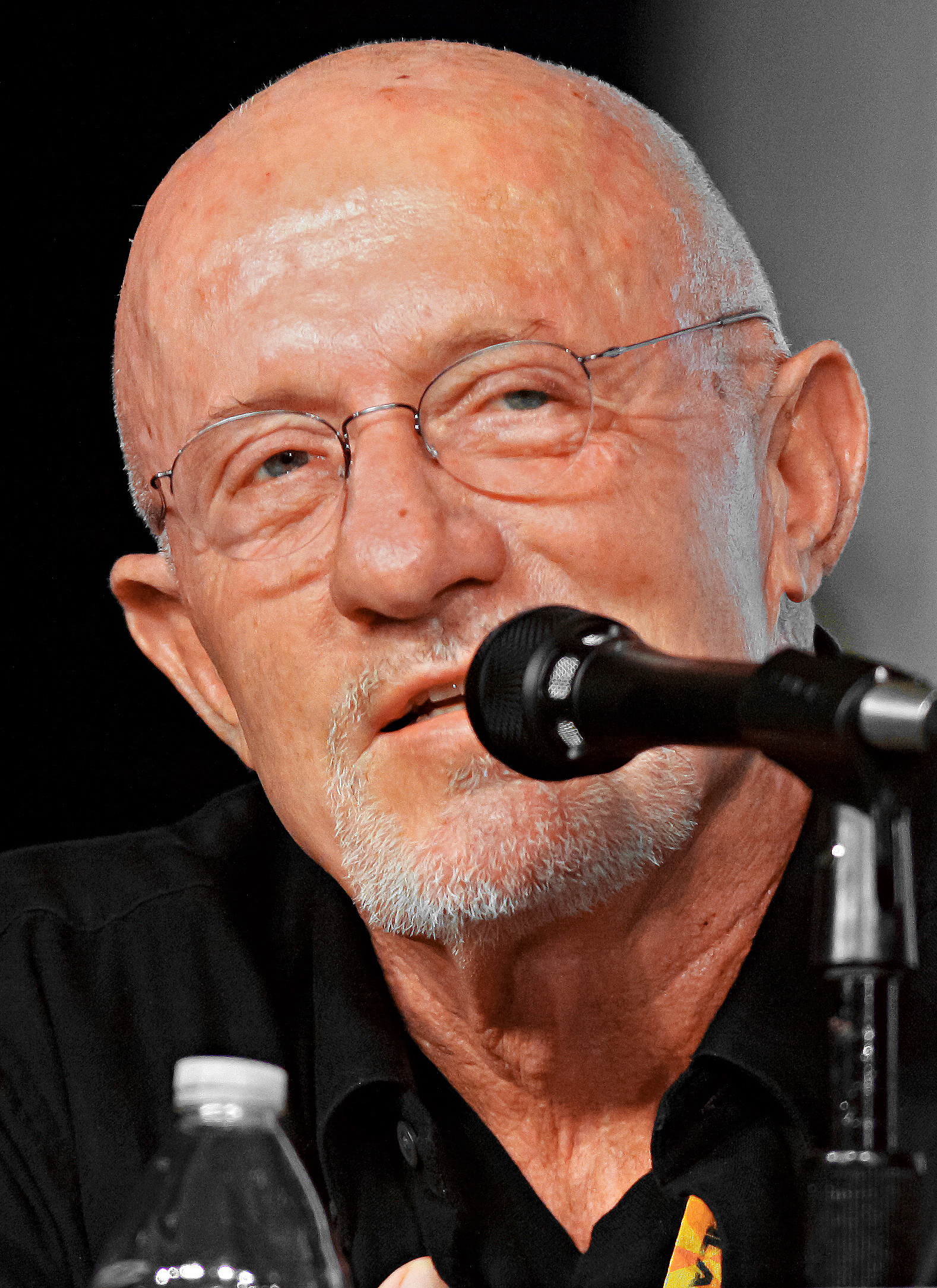
Jonathan Banks won for Better Call Saul (2015)

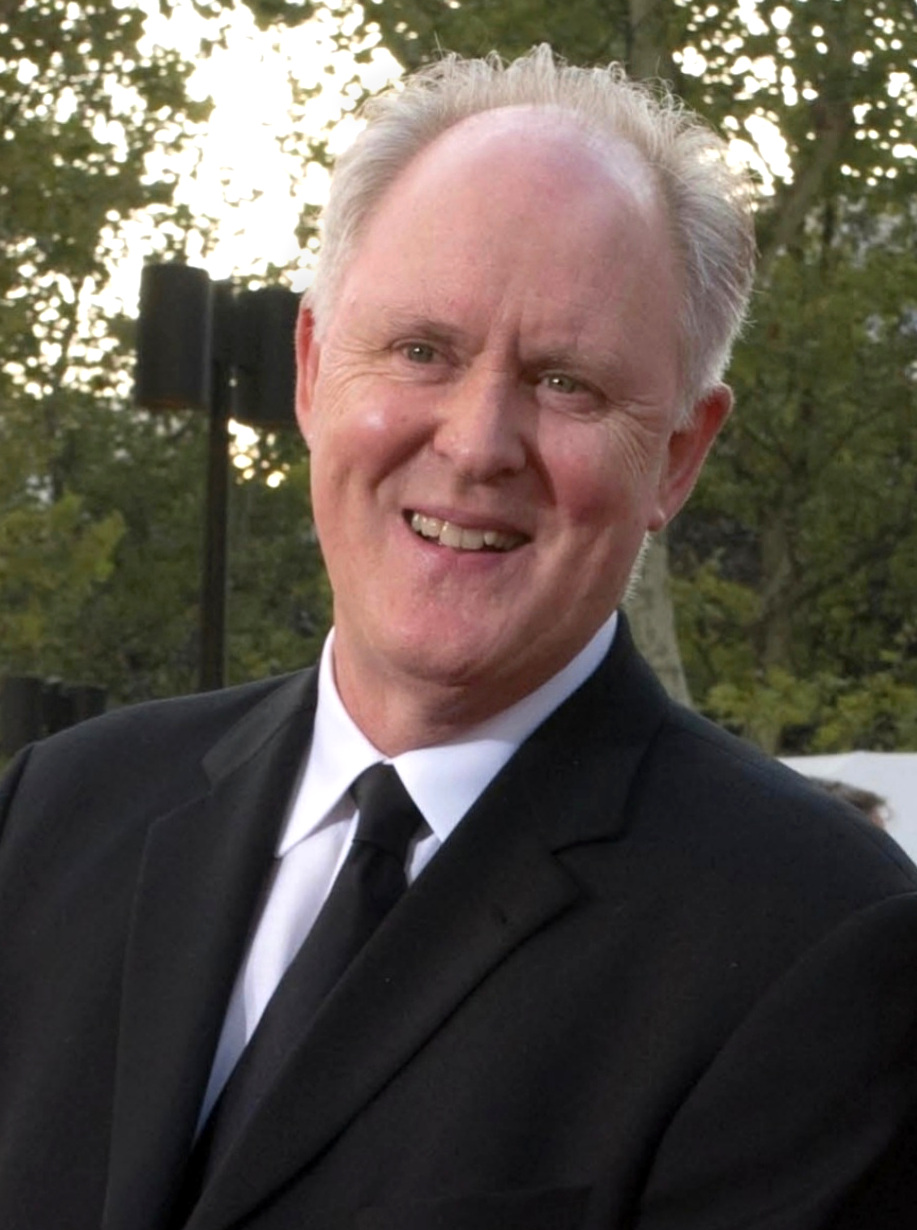
John Lithgow won for The Crown (2016)

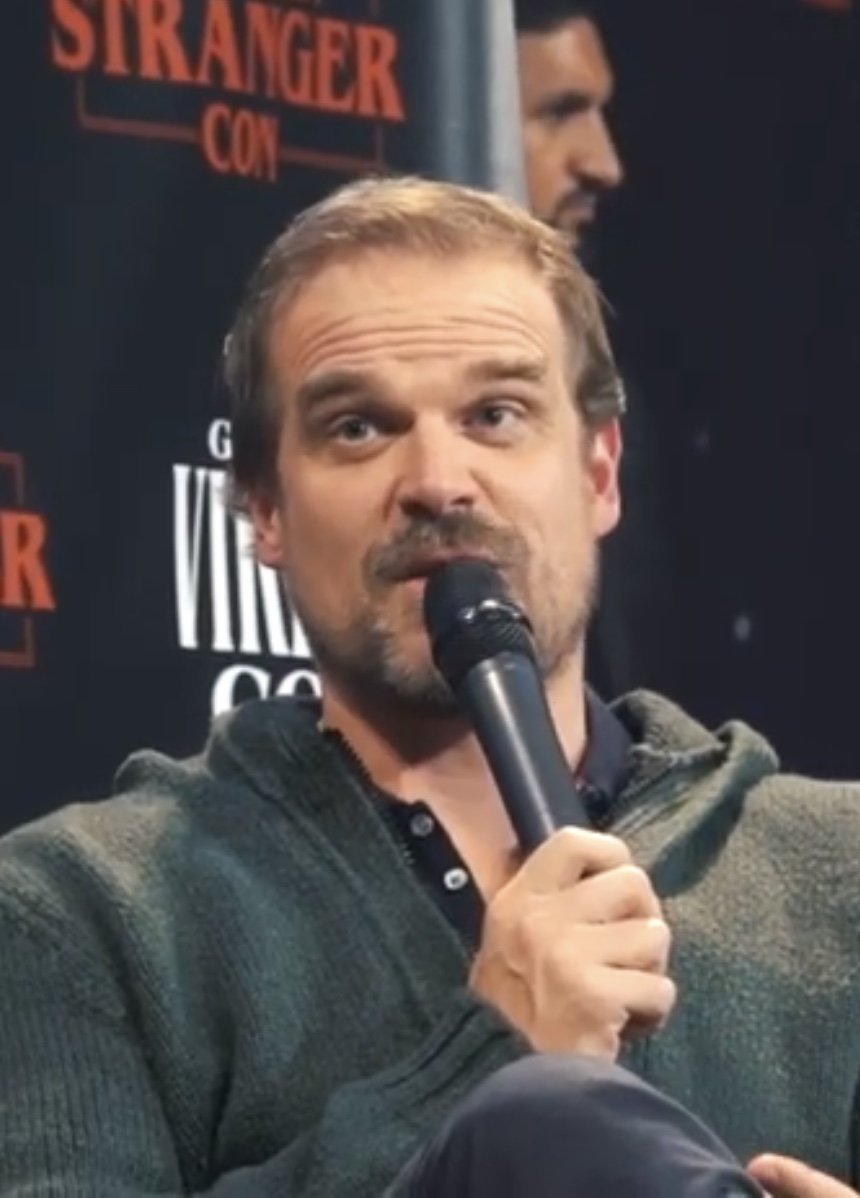
David Harbour won for Stranger Things (2018)

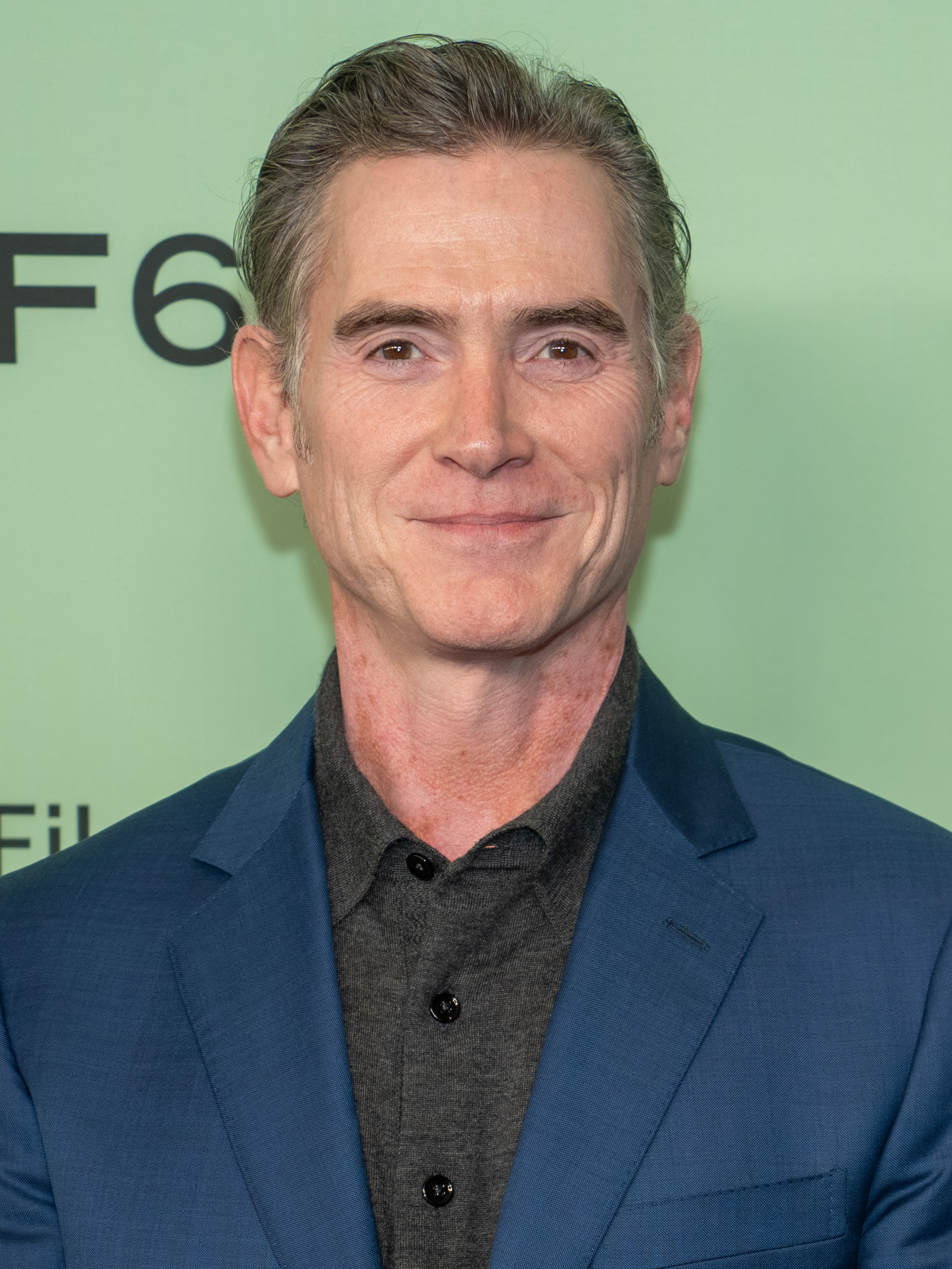
Billy Crudup won twice for The Morning Show (2020, 2022)

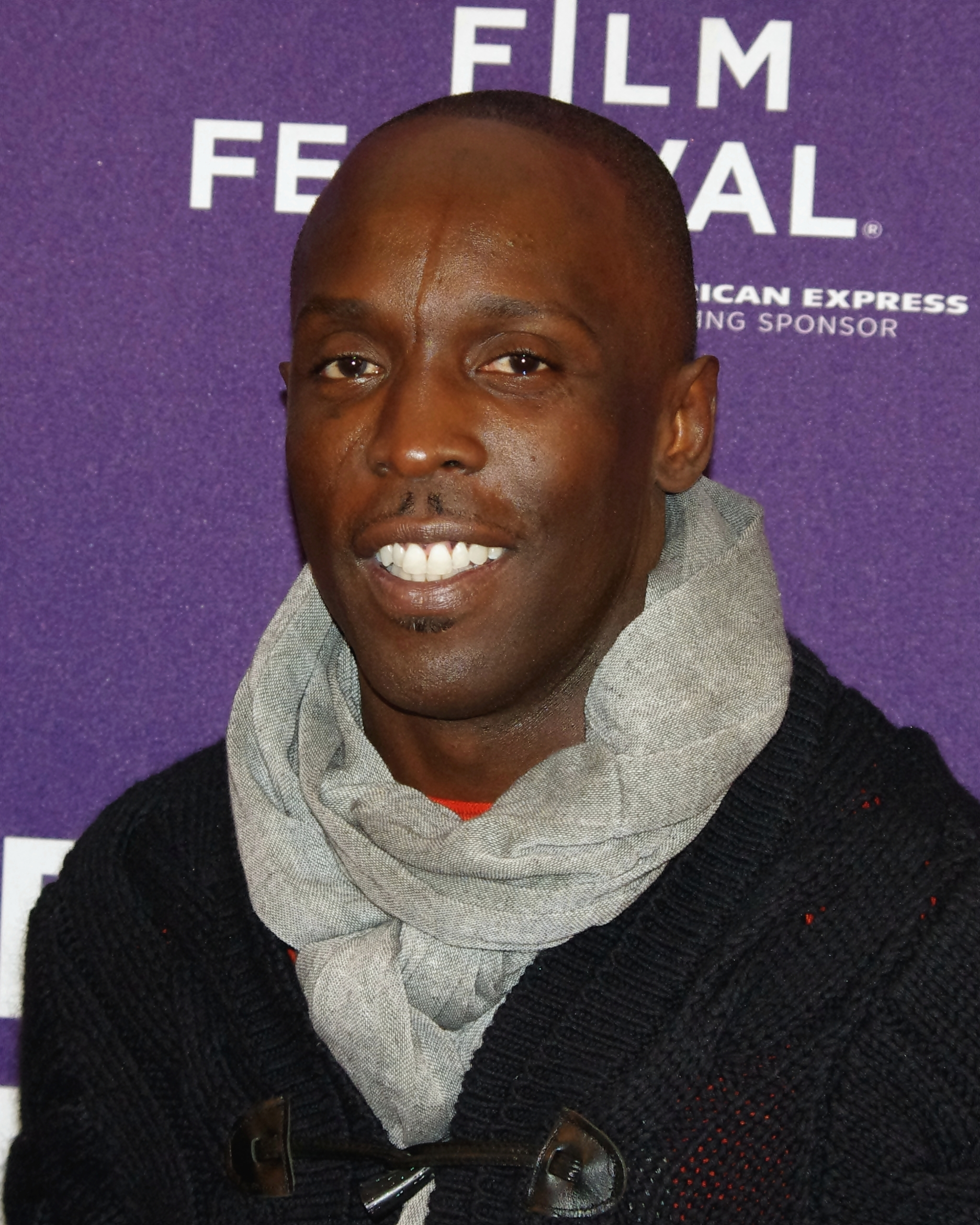
Michael K. Williams won for Lovecraft Country (2021)

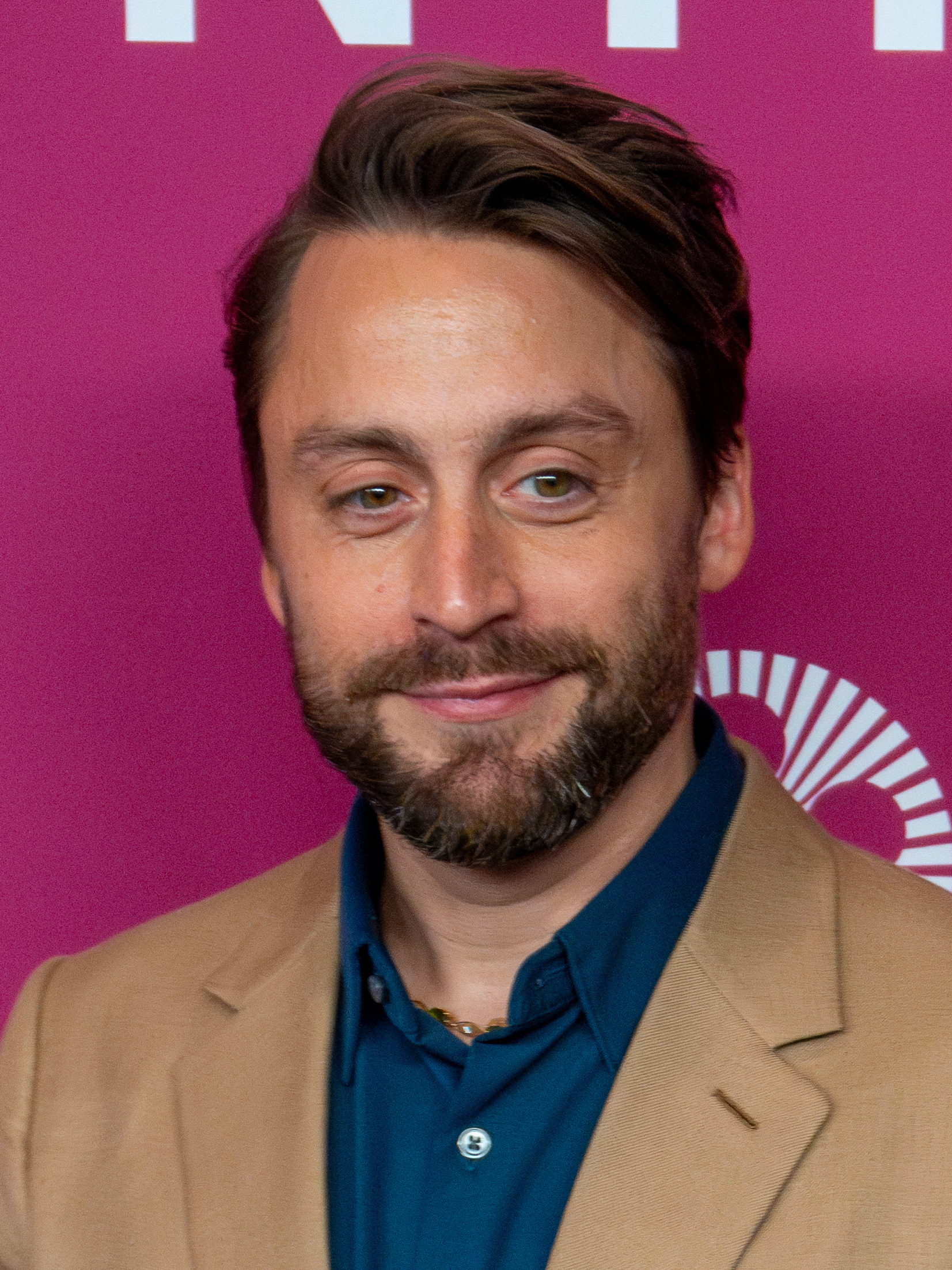
Kieran Culkin won for Succession (2022)

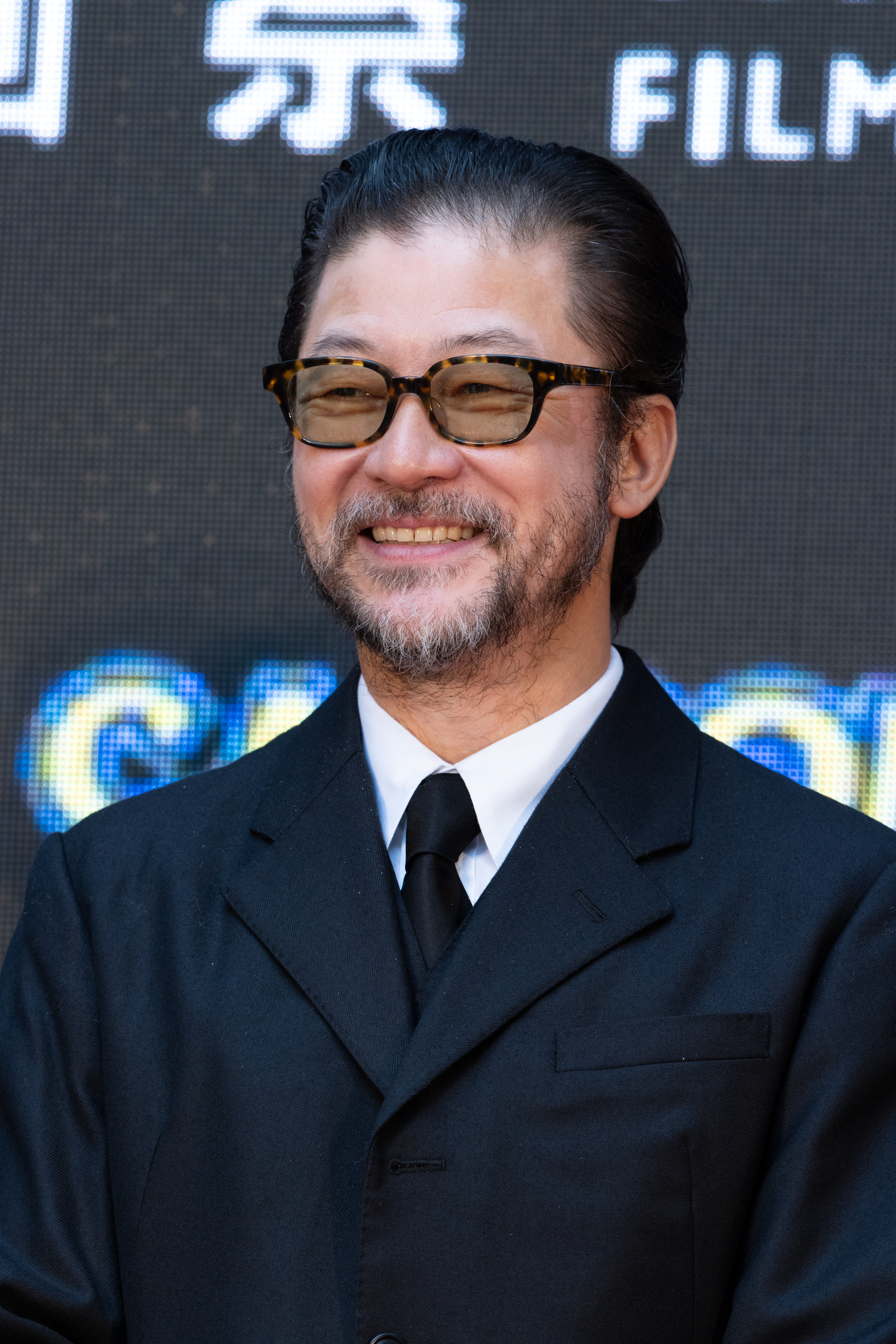
Asano Tadanobu won for Shōgun (2025)

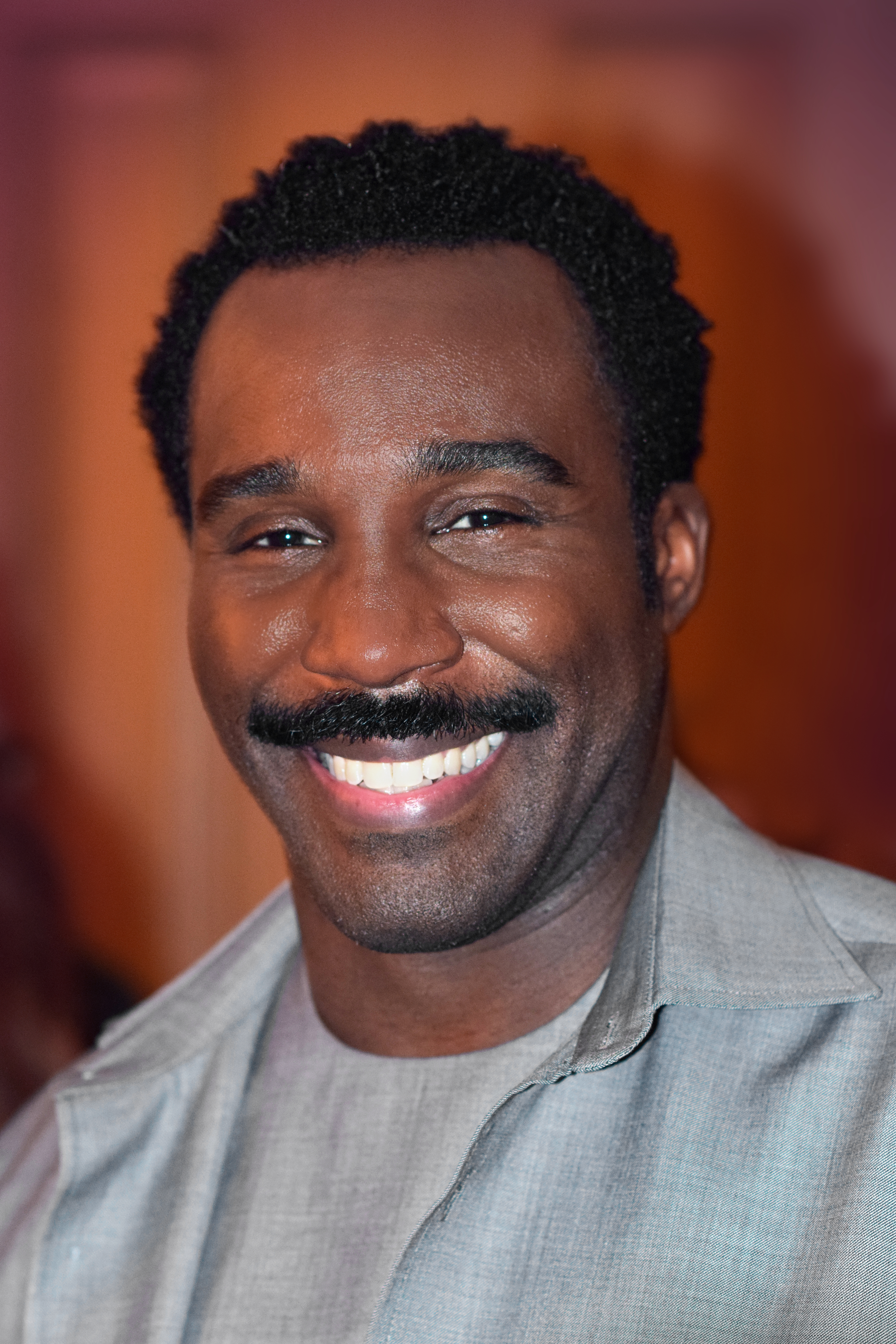
Tramell Tillman won for Severance (2026)

=== 2010s ===
| Year | Actress | Program | Role | Network |
|---|---|---|---|---|
| 2011 | John Noble | Fringe | Walter Bishop | Fox |
| 2011 | Alan Cumming | The Good Wife | Eli Gold | CBS |
| 2011 | Walton Goggins | Justified | Boyd Crowder | FX |
| 2011 | Shawn Hatosy | Southland | Det. Sammy Bryant | TNT |
| 2011 | Michael Pitt | Boardwalk Empire | Jimmy Darmody | HBO |
| 2011 | John Slattery | Mad Men | Roger Sterling | AMC |
| 2012 | Giancarlo Esposito | Breaking Bad | Gus Fring | AMC |
| 2012 | Peter Dinklage | Game of Thrones | Tyrion Lannister | HBO |
| 2012 | Neal McDonough | Justified | Robert Quarles | FX |
| 2012 | John Noble | Fringe | Walter Bishop | Fox |
| 2012 | Aaron Paul | Breaking Bad | Jesse Pinkman | AMC |
| 2012 | John Slattery | Mad Men | Roger Sterling | AMC |
| 2013 | Michael Cudlitz | Southland | John Cooper | TNT |
| 2013 | Jonathan Banks | Breaking Bad | Mike Ehrmantraut | AMC |
| 2013 | Nikolaj Coster-Waldau | Game of Thrones | Jaime Lannister | HBO |
| 2013 | Noah Emmerich | The Americans | Stan Beeman | FX |
| 2013 | Walton Goggins | Justified | Boyd Crowder | FX |
| 2013 | Corey Stoll | House of Cards | Peter Russo | Netflix |
| 2014 | Aaron Paul | Breaking Bad | Jesse Pinkman | AMC |
| 2014 | Josh Charles | The Good Wife | Will Gardner | CBS |
| 2014 | Walton Goggins | Justified | Boyd Crowder | FX |
| 2014 | Peter Sarsgaard | The Killing | Ray Seward | AMC |
| 2014 | Jon Voight | Ray Donovan | Mickey Donovan | Showtime |
| 2014 | Jeffrey Wright | Boardwalk Empire | Dr. Valentin Narcisse | HBO |
| 2015 | Jonathan Banks | Better Call Saul | Mike Ehrmantraut | AMC |
| 2015 | Christopher Eccleston | The Leftovers | Matt Jamison | HBO |
| 2015 | Walton Goggins | Justified | Boyd Crowder | FX |
| 2015 | Ben Mendelsohn | Bloodline | Danny Rayburn | Netflix |
| 2015 | Craig T. Nelson | Parenthood | Zeek Braverman | NBC |
| 2015 | Mandy Patinkin | Homeland | Saul Berenson | Showtime |
| 2016 (1) | Christian Slater | Mr. Robot | Mr. Robot | USA Network |
| 2016 (1) | Clayne Crawford | Rectify | Teddy Talbot, Jr. | Sundance TV |
| 2016 (1) | Christopher Eccleston | The Leftovers | Matt Jamison | HBO |
| 2016 (1) | André Holland | The Knick | Dr. Algernon Edwards | Cinemax |
| 2016 (1) | Jonathan Jackson | Nashville | Avery Barkley | ABC |
| 2016 (1) | Rufus Sewell | The Man in the High Castle | John Smith | Amazon Prime Video |
| 2016 (2) | John Lithgow | The Crown | Winston Churchill | Netflix |
| 2016 (2) | Peter Dinklage | Game of Thrones | Tyrion Lannister | HBO |
| 2016 (2) | Kit Harington | Game of Thrones | Jon Snow | HBO |
| 2016 (2) | Michael McKean (Note: In 2016, Mandy Patinkin was nominated for the Showtime series Homeland. His nomination was rescinded after it was noted that Homeland was not in the eligibility window for that year's ceremony. Seventh place finisher Michael McKean received the nomination in his place.) | Better Call Saul | Chuck McGill | AMC |
| 2016 (2) | Christian Slater | Mr. Robot | Mr. Robot | USA Network |
| 2016 (2) | Jon Voight | Ray Donovan | Mickey Donovan | Showtime |
| 2018 | David Harbour | Stranger Things | Jim Hopper | Netflix |
| 2018 | Bobby Cannavale | Mr. Robot | Irving | USA Network |
| 2018 | Asia Kate Dillon | Billions | Taylor Amber Mason | Showtime |
| 2018 | Peter Dinklage | Game of Thrones | Tyrion Lannister | HBO |
| 2018 | Delroy Lindo | The Good Fight | Adrian Boseman | CBS All Access |
| 2018 | Michael McKean | Better Call Saul | Chuck McGill | AMC |
| 2019 | Noah Emmerich | The Americans | Stan Beeman | FX |
| 2019 | Richard Cabral | Mayans M.C. | Johnny "El Coco" Cruz | FX |
| 2019 | Asia Kate Dillon | Billions | Taylor Amber Mason | Showtime |
| 2019 | Justin Hartley | This Is Us | Kevin Pearson | NBC |
| 2019 | Matthew Macfadyen | Succession | Tom Wamsgans | HBO |
| 2019 | Richard Schiff | The Good Doctor | Dr. Aaron Glassman | ABC |
| 2019 | Shea Whigham | Homecoming | Thomas Carrasco | Amazon Prime Video |

=== 2020s ===
| Year | Actress | Program | Role | Network |
|---|---|---|---|---|
| 2020 | Billy Crudup | The Morning Show | Cory Ellison | Apple TV+ |
| 2020 | Asante Blackk | This Is Us | Malik | NBC |
| 2020 | Asia Kate Dillon | Billions | Taylor Amber Mason | Showtime |
| 2020 | Peter Dinklage | Game of Thrones | Tyrion Lannister | HBO |
| 2020 | Justin Hartley | This Is Us | Kevin Pearson | NBC |
| 2020 | Delroy Lindo | The Good Fight | Adrian Boseman | CBS All Access |
| 2020 | Tim Blake Nelson | Watchmen | Wade Tillman / Looking Glass | HBO |
| 2021 | Michael K. Williams | Lovecraft Country | Montrose Freeman | HBO |
| 2021 | Jonathan Banks | Better Call Saul | Mike Ehrmantraut | AMC |
| 2021 | Justin Hartley | This Is Us | Kevin Pearson | NBC |
| 2021 | John Lithgow | Perry Mason | Elias Birchard "E.B." Jonathan | HBO |
| 2021 | Tobias Menzies | The Crown | Prince Philip, Duke of Edinburgh | Netflix |
| 2021 | Tom Pelphrey | Ozark | Ben Davis | Netflix |
| 2022 | Kieran Culkin | Succession | Roman Roy | HBO |
| 2022 | Nicholas Braun | Succession | Greg Hirsch | HBO |
| 2022 | Billy Crudup | The Morning Show | Cory Ellison | Apple TV+ |
| 2022 | Justin Hartley | This Is Us | Kevin Pearson | NBC |
| 2022 | Matthew Macfadyen | Succession | Tom Wambsgans | HBO |
| 2022 | Mandy Patinkin | The Good Fight | Hal Wackner | Paramount+ |
| 2023 | Giancarlo Esposito | Better Call Saul | Gus Fring | AMC |
| 2023 | Andre Braugher | The Good Fight | Ri'Chard Lane | Paramount+ |
| 2023 | Ismael Cruz Córdova | The Lord of the Rings: The Rings of Power | Arondir | Amazon Prime Video |
| 2023 | Michael Emerson | Evil | Dr. Leland Townsend | Paramount+ |
| 2023 | John Lithgow | The Old Man | Harold Harper | FX |
| 2023 | Matt Smith | House of the Dragon | Daemon Targaryen | HBO |
| 2024 | Billy Crudup | The Morning Show | Cory Ellison | Apple TV+ |
| 2024 | Khalid Abdalla | The Crown | Dodi Fayed | Netflix |
| 2024 | Ron Cephas Jones (posthumous) | Truth Be Told | Lukather "Shreve" Scoville | Apple TV+ |
| 2024 | Matthew Macfadyen | Succession | Tom Wambsgans | HBO / Max |
| 2024 | Ke Huy Quan | Loki | O.B. / A.D. Doug, Ph.D | Disney+ |
| 2024 | Rufus Sewell | The Diplomat | Hal Wyler | Netflix |
| 2025 | Tadanobu Asano | Shōgun | Kashigi Yabushige | FX / Hulu |
| 2025 | Michael Emerson | Evil | Leland Townsend | Paramount+ |
| 2025 | Mark-Paul Gosselaar | Found | Hugh "Sir" Evans | NBC |
| 2025 | Takehiro Hira | Shōgun | Ishido Kazunari | FX / Hulu |
| 2025 | John Lithgow | The Old Man | Harold Harper | FX |
| 2025 | Sam Reid | Interview with the Vampire | Lestat de Lioncourt | AMC |
| 2026 | Tramell Tillman | Severance | Seth Milchick | Apple TV |
| 2026 | Patrick Ball | The Pitt | Dr. Frank Langdon | HBO Max |
| 2026 | Billy Crudup | The Morning Show | Cory Ellison | Apple TV |
| 2026 | Ato Essandoh | The Diplomat | Stuart Hayford | Netflix |
| 2026 | Wood Harris | Forever | Eric | Netflix |
| 2026 | Tom Pelphrey | Task | Robbie Prendergrast | HBO Max |

== Performers with multiple wins ==
2 wins

- Billy Crudup
- Giancarlo Esposito

== Performers with multiple nominations ==
4 nominations

- Billy Crudup
- Peter Dinklage
- Walton Goggins
- Justin Hartley
- John Lithgow

3 nominations

- Jonathan Banks
- Asia Kate Dillon
- Matthew Macfadyen

2 nominations

- Christopher Eccleston
- Michael Emerson
- Noah Emmerich
- Giancarlo Esposito
- Delroy Lindo
- Michael McKean
- John Noble
- Mandy Patinkin
- Aaron Paul
- Tom Pelphrey
- Rufus Sewell
- Christian Slater
- John Slattery
- Jon Voight

== Programmes with multiple nominations ==
6 nominations

- Game of Thrones

5 nominations

- Better Call Saul
- Justified
- Succession

4 nominations

- Breaking Bad
- The Good Fight
- The Morning Show
- This Is Us

3 nominations

- Billions
- The Crown
- Mr. Robot

2 nominations

- The Americans
- Boardwalk Empire
- The Diplomat
- Evil
- Fringe
- The Good Wife
- The Leftovers
- Mad Men
- The Old Man
- Ray Donovan
- Shōgun
- Southland

== See also ==
- TCA Award for Individual Achievement in Drama
- Primetime Emmy Award for Outstanding Supporting Actor in a Drama Series
- Golden Globe Award for Best Supporting Actor – Series, Miniseries or Television Film
