= Liminal (film) =

Upcoming film by Louis Leterrier

- Directed by: Louis Leterrier
- Screenplay by: Justin Rhodes
- Based on: Telepaths by: J. Michael Straczynski; Steve Epting; Brian Reber
- Produced by: Zach Studin; Kevin J. Walsh
- Starring: Vanessa Kirby; Yahya Abdul-Mateen II; Tom Pelphrey; Franka Potente; Tracy Letts; Paul Sparks
- Cinematography: Dariusz Wolski
- Production companies: Apple Studios; AWA Studios; The Walsh Company
- Distributed by: Apple Original Films
- Country: United States
- Language: English

Liminal is an upcoming American science fiction action thriller film directed by Louis Leterrier, from a screenplay by Justin Rhodes, and based on the 2022 graphic novel Telepaths by J. Michael Straczynski, Steve Epting, and Brian Reber. It stars Vanessa Kirby, Yahya Abdul-Mateen II, Tom Pelphrey, Franka Potente, Tracy Letts, and Paul Sparks.

== Cast ==
- Vanessa Kirby
- Yahya Abdul-Mateen II
- Tom Pelphrey
- Franka Potente
- Tracy Letts
- Paul Sparks
- Ava Threat
- Johnny Serret

== Production ==
=== Development ===
In late March 2026, it was announced that Louis Leterrier would be directing for Apple TV an adaptation of the 2022 graphic novel Telepaths by J. Michael Straczynski, Steve Epting, and Brian Reber, titled Liminal, with Justin Rhodes writing the screenplay, and Vanessa Kirby and Yahya Abdul-Mateen II starring. In April, Tom Pelphrey, Franka Potente, and Tracy Letts joined the cast. In May, Paul Sparks and Ava Threat joined the cast.

=== Filming ===
Principal photography began on May 4, 2026, in New York City and Morocco, with Dariusz Wolski serving as the cinematographer.
