= Running on Empty (2024 film) =

American sci-fi romantic comedy film

- Directed by: Daniel André
- Screenplay by: Daniel André
- Produced by: Daniel André; Robert Ogden Barnum; Greg Lauritano; Lucas Jarach; Luke Daniels
- Starring: Lucy Hale; Keir Gilchrist
- Cinematography: Matt Klammer
- Edited by: Ethan Maniquis
- Music by: Keith Weidner
- Production companies: Redwire Pictures; Analog77 Films
- Distributed by: Lionsgate
- Release date: August 9, 2024
- Running time: 91 minutes
- Country: United States
- Language: English

Running on Empty is a 2024 romantic comedy science fiction film written and directed by Daniel André and starring Lucy Hale and Keir Gilchrist.

== Premise ==
Set in the near future in San Fernando Valley, California, the technology exists for a mortician to discover how long he has left to live, and he decides to make the most of every day.

== Cast ==
- Lucy Hale as Kate
- Keir Gilchrist as Mort
- Emelina Adams as Olivia
- Dustin Milligan as Randall
- Francesca Eastwood as Nicole
- Monica Potter as Elaine
- Clara McGregor as Brittany
- Leslie Stratton as Rita
- Dylan Flashner as Nathaniel
- Isaac C. Singleton Jr. as Big Rey
- Jim Gaffigan as Barry
- Rhys Coiro as Simon
- Jay Pharoah as Sid
- Carolyn Hennesy as Tilda

== Plot ==
In the near future, a technology known as Life Day Count (LDC) can predict approximately how long a person is likely to live. Mortimer (Mort), an awkward mortician in the San Fernando Valley, takes the test with his fiancé, Nicole, while they are trying to buy a house. Nicole learns that she has nearly 60 years left to live, but Mort discovers that he has only 345 days remaining. Fearing the consequences of marrying someone who is expected to die so soon, Nicole ends their engagement and begins dating a man with decades left to live. Mort falls into despair, while his coworker and friend Sid encourages him to go out and make more of his remaining time.

Mort joins a dating service for people with relatively short life expectancies. There he meets Kate, an employee of the dating service, and the two gradually develop a romantic connection. Meanwhile, Sid persuades Mort to go to a bar, where Mort meets Rita, a sex worker. Rita dies during their encounter, on what turns out to be her own last day. Her pimp, Simon, demands money from Mort for Rita's services and takes Mort's car as collateral when he cannot pay. Simon subsequently continues to threaten Mort and demand money from him.

As Mort and Kate grow closer, Mort begins to live more actively instead of passively waiting for death. He and Kate plan a trip to Japan to climb Mount Fuji. At the airport, just as they are preparing to leave, Mort is struck by a vehicle and dies in Kate's arms. As the film ends, Mort's introductory dating-service video plays as he reflects on life and death.

== Production ==
The project was announced in 2022 with the title Mort in Sherman Oaks. It is written and directed by Daniel André in his feature length debut. It is produced by Robert Ogden Barnum, Greg Lauritano, Lucas Jarach, Luke Daniels and Daniel André.

The cast is led by Lucy Hale and Keir Gilchrist and also includes Jim Gaffigan, Jay Pharoah, Rhys Coiro and Monica Potter.

== Release ==
The film was released by Lionsgate on 9 August 2024.

== Reception ==
On the review aggregator website Rotten Tomatoes, Running on Empty holds an approval rating of 16% from 19 reviews.

Ben Gibbons for Screen Rant praised Lucy Hale's performance which "shines in the film" and said that "Keir Gilchrist and Hale have great chemistry" but criticised the script. Monica Castillo for Rogerebert.com said the film has a "playful premise" but criticised the script which "quickly falls apart with repeated jokes".
