= Back on the Strip =

2023 American comedy film

- Theatrical release poster
- Directed by: Chris Spencer
- Written by: Eric Daniel; Chris Spencer
- Produced by: Wesley Snipes; Tiffany Haddish; Geno Taylor; Missy Valdez; Elie Samaha; Donald Kushner; Jeru Tillman; Chris Spencer; Vanessa Rodriguez Spencer; Eric Daniel
- Starring: Wesley Snipes; J. B. Smoove; Gary Owen; Bill Bellamy; Spence Moore II; Raigan Harris; Faizon Love; Tiffany Haddish
- Cinematography: Joshua Reis
- Edited by: Maura Corey
- Music by: Dontae Winslow
- Production companies: Luminosity Entertainment; 5120 Entertainment; Junction Films; Southfield Village Entertainment
- Distributed by: GVN Releasing
- Release date: August 18, 2023
- Running time: 112 minutes
- Country: United States
- Language: English
- Box office: $703,141

Back on the Strip is a 2023 American comedy film directed and co-written by Chris Spencer in his feature film directorial debut. The film stars Wesley Snipes, J. B. Smoove, Gary Owen, Bill Bellamy, Spence Moore II, Raigan Harris, Faizon Love, and Tiffany Haddish. It was also produced by Snipes and Haddish with Luminosity Entertainment -- Franchise Pictures' successor after 15 years. The film also marks film producer Elie Samaha teaming up with Snipes for the first time since Zig Zag (2002).

The film was released to theatres in the United States on August 18, 2023.

== Premise ==
Merlin moves to Las Vegas in the hopes of becoming a famous magician, but gets waylaid by his natural gifts and a place with the Black male strippers The Chocolate Chips.

== Cast ==
- Wesley Snipes as Luther "Mr. Big"
- Tiffany Haddish as Verna
- JB Smoove as Amos
- Gary Owen as Xander
- Bill Bellamy as Tyriq
- Spence Moore II as Merlin
- Raigan Harris as Robin
- Faizon Love as Desmond
- Kevin Hart as Uptight Dad
- Piper Curda as Gia
- Emelina Adams as Bambi
- Colleen Camp as Rita
- Caryn Ward as Eve

== Production ==
Eric Daniel and Chris Spencer co-wrote the film with Spencer also directing. Wesley Snipes and Tiffany Haddish appear in and co-produce the movie. Producers for Luminosity Entertainment are Geno Taylor, Missy Valdez and Elie Samaha. Speaking at the Oscar ceremony in 2022, Snipes confirmed that filming had been completed and he played a one-legged member of the strip group The Chocolate Chips, he also confirmed a role for Kevin Hart in the movie. In August 2022, Emelina Adams confirmed a role in the film and that she filmed on location in Vegas.

== Reception ==
=== Critical response ===
On the review aggregator website Rotten Tomatoes, 25% of 12 critics' reviews are positive, with an average rating of 4.3/10. Metacritic, which uses a weighted average, assigned the film a score of 48 out of 100, based on five critics, indicating "mixed or average" reviews.
