= Emelina Adams =

American actress and model

- Born: Henderson, Nevada
- Occupation: actress

Emelina Adams is an American actress and model.

== Early life ==
Adams’ hometown is Henderson, Nevada. Adams graduated with a Bachelor’s degree in psychology with a minor in pre-law from the University of Arizona. She lost her sister in 2016 to addiction and has campaigned against addiction in the years since. Adams is a second generation Italian and her father’s family come from Calabria, in southern Italy.

== Career ==
=== Modelling ===
Adams began modelling at a young age and after being awarded one of the Tucson 12 spots at the University of Arizona she went on to win Miss Nevada USA 2016. Adams global modelling campaigns have included Marciano by GUESS.

=== Acting ===
Adams made her acting debut in 2019 in the Netflix series 13 Reasons Why. Adams appears as Angelina Young in the 2022 feature film Bullet Train alongside Brad Pitt amongst others, and the upcoming 2022 Wesley Snipes and Tiffany Haddish co-produced and co-starring film Back on the Strip.

She appeared in Deadly Games, a crime-thriller filmed in Mexico from director Ojan Missaghi. Adams was also cast in Don’t Suck with Jamie Kennedy, Mort In Sherman Oaks with Lucy Hale, American Murderer with Ryan Phillipe, and Michael Matteo Rossi’s The Sweepers.

== Filmography ==
Key
†	Denotes films that have not yet been released

Year	Title	Role	Notes
2019	13 Reasons Why	Presmilla	1 episode
2021	Blood Pageant	Isabella	
2022	Bullet Train	Angelina Young	
2022	American Murderer	Michelle	
2023	Back on the Strip	Bambi	
2023	Murder Syndicate	Mira	
2023	Minx	Latin American Model	1 episode
2023	Stay Out	Nurse Megan	TV movie
2023	Don’t Suck	Darrah	
2024	Deadly Games	Loren Mason	
2024	Twisted Hearts	Tori	
2024	Running on Empty	Olivia	
