= American Murderer =

2022 film directed by Matthew Gentile

- Poster
- Directed by: Matthew Gentile
- Written by: Matthew Gentile
- Produced by: Kevin Matusow; Carissa Buffel; Gia Walsh
- Starring: Tom Pelphrey; Idina Menzel; Ryan Phillippe; Jacki Weaver; Shantel VanSanten; Paul Schneider; Kevin Corrigan; Moisés Arias
- Cinematography: Kalilah Robinson
- Edited by: Matt Allen; Christopher Young
- Music by: Scott Gentile
- Production companies: The Traveling Picture Show Company; Gigi Films
- Distributed by: Lionsgate/Saban Films (US & Canada), Universal Pictures (International)
- Release dates: June 27, 2022 (TFF); October 21, 2022 (United States)
- Running time: 102 minutes
- Country: United States
- Language: English

American Murderer is a 2022 American true crime drama film, written and directed by Matthew Gentile in his feature directorial debut. It stars Tom Pelphrey, Idina Menzel, Ryan Phillippe, Jacki Weaver, Paul Schneider, Shantel VanSanten, Kevin Corrigan, and Moisés Arias. The film tells the story of Jason Derek Brown and premiered on June 27, 2022, at the Taormina Film Fest in Sicily. The film was theatrically released in the United States on October 21, 2022, and received positive reviews, with particular praise for Pelphrey's and Weaver's performances and Gentile's direction. It also performed very well on streaming, topping charts in over 50 countries, including the top 10 on Hulu.

== Cast ==
- Tom Pelphrey as Jason Derek Brown
- Idina Menzel as Melanie
- Ryan Phillippe as Lance Leising
- Jacki Weaver as Jeanne
- Shantel VanSanten as Jamie Brown
- Paul Schneider as David Brown
- Kevin Corrigan as David Brown Sr.
- Moisés Arias as Kyle Wallace
- Emelina Adams as Michelle

== Production ==
Writer/Director Matthew Gentile had first learned about Jason Derek Brown when he was about fourteen years old: "Before I wanted to be a filmmaker, I wanted to be an FBI agent. I had heard about Jason's case because I used to go on the FBI website and I would look at the top 10 fugitives. Jason's face stuck out because on the Top 10 list you have menacing faces, Whitey Bulger, Osama Bin Laden, and then this surfer dude from Southern California. I was immediately interested in the story."

After graduating film school at the American Film Institute over a decade later, Gentile learned Brown was still missing and became inspired to tell this story as his first feature film. Inspired by dark, gritty character studies such as Star 80, The Honeymoon Killers, and Vengeance is Mine, Gentile wrote the screenplay on spec.

In 2018, he completed a proof of concept short film with Jonathan Groff in the main role and Amanda Crew which served as a calling card for the screenplay that was sold to Traveling Picture Show Company and GiGi Films.

In December 2020, it was announced Tom Pelphrey, Idina Menzel, Ryan Phillippe, Jacki Weaver, Paul Schneider, Shantel VanSanten, Kevin Corrigan and Moisés Arias had joined the cast of the film.

Principal photography was completed on a tight schedule (22 days) at the height of the pandemic, in November/December 2020, with pick-ups and second unit photography done in early 2021.

== Release ==
It premiered at the Taormina Film Fest in Sicily on June 27, 2022, where it was nominated for the Cariddi D'Oro.

After early screenings at multiple festivals including Newport Beach, Boston, Fayetteville, and Buffalo—the film won the Artistic Director's Award at the San Diego International Film Festival in October 2022, Best Narrative Feature at Fayetteville Film Fest, and Best Actor (Tom Pelphrey) and Best Music (Scott Gentile) at the Boston Film Festival.

On 19 July 2022, it was announced in Variety that Saban Films bought the rights to distribute American Murderer in the United States and Canada. It had a limited theatrical release on October 21, 2022, before coming out on digital/demand on October 28, 2022.

American Murderer was released internationally by Universal Pictures on January 30, 2023.

== Reception ==
On the review aggregator website Rotten Tomatoes, 76% of 42 critics' reviews are positive, with an average rating of 6.1/10. The website's consensus reads: "Tom Pelphrey kills it as the American Murderer, delivering standard true crime goods to fans of the genre."

After the international release through Universal Pictures, American Murderer became a top 10 hit on streaming platforms including Hulu, iTunes, Google, Rakuten TV, and OSN in over 45 countries including the US, Italy, Spain, Brazil, Germany, Austria, and Switzerland.

In an article for We Got This Covered, Scott Campbell analyzed how American Murderer became a sleeper hit on streaming.
