= Tiger Lily Road =

- Film poster
- Directed by: Michael Medeiros
- Written by: Michael Medeiros
- Produced by: Michael Medeiros
- Starring: Ilvi Dulack; Tom Pelphrey; Karen Chamberlain
- Cinematography: Nils Kenaston
- Music by: Milosz Jeziorski
- Production company: Cinefugitivo
- Release date: October 24, 2014 (Quad Cinema)
- Running time: 89 minutes
- Country: United States
- Language: English

Tiger Lily Road is a 2013 American dark comedy thriller written and directed by Michael Medeiros and starring Ilvi Dulack, Tom Pelphrey and Karen Chamberlain. It won the Audience Award for Best Feature Comedy at the 2013 Woods Hole Film Festival

== Cast ==
- Ilvi Dulack as Annie McCann
- Karen Chamberlain as Louise Friedkin
- Tom Pelphrey as Rocky Harden
- Tom Nardini as Russell Chambers
- Rita Gardner as Betty McCann
- Sarah Shaefer as Sandy
- William Hill as Mr. O'Grady
- Krista Amigone as Leanne Crumb
- Michael Medeiros as Deputy Bob
- Kevin Kane as Delivery Guy
