= Tom Pelphrey =

American actor (born 1982)

- Born: Thomas Joseph Pelphrey; July 28, 1982 (age 44); Howell Township, New Jersey, U.S.
- Education: Rutgers University, New Brunswick (BFA)
- Occupation: Actor
- Years active: 2003–present
- Partner(s): Kaley Cuoco (2022–present; engaged)
- Children: 2

Thomas Joseph Pelphrey (born July 28, 1982) is an American actor. Beginning his career on soap operas, Pelphrey had supporting roles as Jonathan Randall on the CBS daytime soap opera Guiding Light (2003–2009) and Mick Dante on the CBS soap opera As the World Turns (2009–2010). He had supporting roles in films such as The Girl Is in Trouble (2015), Mank (2020), and She Said (2022), and a leading role in American Murderer (2022).

On television, Pelphrey is best known for his supporting role as Kurt Bunker on the third and fourth seasons of the Cinemax action crime drama series Banshee (2015–2016), as well as his leading roles as Ward Meachum on the Netflix superhero fantasy series Iron Fist (2017–2018), Perry Abbott on the Amazon Prime Video neo-western science fiction series Outer Range (2023–2024), Don Crowder on the HBO Max biographical crime drama miniseries Love & Death (2023), and Raymond Peepgrass on the Netflix drama miniseries A Man in Full (2024).

Pelphrey gained further recognition and acclaim for his supporting roles as Ben Davis on the third and fourth seasons of the Netflix crime drama series Ozark (2020–2022), for which he was nominated for the Primetime Emmy Award for Outstanding Guest Actor in a Drama Series, the Critics' Choice Television Award for Best Supporting Actor in a Drama Series, and the Satellite Award for Best Supporting Actor – Series, Miniseries or Television Film, and as Robbie Prendergrast on the HBO crime drama series Task (2025), for which he won the Primetime Emmy Award for Outstanding Supporting Actor in a Drama Series and received a second Critics' Choice nomination for Best Supporting Actor in a Drama Series.

== Early life and education ==
Pelphrey was born Thomas Joseph Pelphrey on July 28, 1982, in Howell Township, New Jersey, to Laurie (née Demgard) and Richard Pelphrey (1950–2007). He has one brother named Robert. He graduated from Howell High School in 2000, and from Rutgers University (Mason Gross School of the Arts) in 2004 with a Bachelor of Fine Arts degree.

== Career ==
=== Guiding Light ===
Pelphrey's first notable role was on the CBS soap opera Guiding Light as Jonathan Randall, the son of Reva Shayne and her late former husband, Richard Winslow. He joined the cast in October 2003 and received critical acclaim for his portrayal of anti-hero Jonathan.

He was nominated for a Daytime Emmy Award for "Outstanding Younger Actor" in 2005 and won the award the following year. He received a third consecutive nomination in the same category in 2007 but lost to Bryton McClure. Pelphrey won his second Daytime Emmy Award for "Outstanding Younger Actor" in 2008.

=== As the World Turns ===
Pelphrey played Mick Dante on As the World Turns from October 2009 to February 2010 when his character was sent to prison for his misdeeds. The role earned Pelphrey an Emmy pre-nomination for Best Supporting Actor.

=== Other television and film roles ===
On March 30, 2007, he appeared in an episode of Numb3rs, "Pandora's Box". On October 17, 2008, he appeared in an episode of "Ghost Whisperer", and the following season in an episode of Law & Order: Special Victims Unit. In 2015 Pelphrey landed the recurring role of Kurt Bunker, a former neo-Nazi trying to reintegrate into society, on Cinemax's action drama Banshee. To prepare for this role he started lifting weights and did research by reading books on the neo-Nazi movement in America. In 2017, he appeared in Iron Fist as Ward Meachum and portrayed Ben Davis on the third season of the Netflix crime drama Ozark which was released on March 27, 2020. His portrayal in the latter received critical acclaim and the lack of an Emmy nomination was perceived as a snub by fans and critics. Nonetheless, Pelphrey received nominations for Critics' Choice Television Award for Best Supporting Actor in a Drama Series, Satellite Award for Best Supporting Actor – Series, Miniseries or Television Film and Screen Actors Guild Award for Outstanding Performance by an Ensemble in a Drama Series (shared with the cast). Pelphrey portrayed Joe Mankiewicz in David Fincher's 2020 film, Mank and Jason Derek Brown in the 2022 true crime film, American Murderer. In the final season of Ozark (2022), Pelphrey reprised the role of Ben Davis as a guest appearance, for which he received an Emmy nomination for Outstanding Guest Actor in a Drama Series.

In 2022, he starred on the Amazon Prime Video series Outer Range as Perry Abbott.

In 2023, he starred on the HBO miniseries Love & Death as Don Crowder. Pelphrey won Best Actor at the Bucharest Film Awards and the Manchester International Film Festival for his performance in the 2023 film, Jill. He was nominated and won an Emmy for the 2026 Critics' Choice Television Award for Best Supporting Actor in a Drama Series for his performance in Task.

=== Theater ===
From September 6, 2007, to September 30, 2007, Pelphrey performed in Kevin Mandel's A New Television Arrives Finally as the title character, at Theatre 54, in New York. Pelphrey starred in In God's Hat at the Peter Jay Sharp Theater, in New York City, through August 7, 2010. In 2012, he appeared in the Broadway cast of the musical drama End of the Rainbow as Mickey Deans; in 2015, he returned to Broadway in a revival of Fool for Love, playing Martin.

== Personal life ==
In 2022, Pelphrey began dating actress Kaley Cuoco. Cuoco gave birth to their first daughter on March 30, 2023. They announced their engagement on August 14, 2024. Their second daughter was born on October 12, 2026.

Pelphrey is a fan of the New York Giants.

== Filmography ==
=== Film ===
Year	Title	Role	Notes
2008	Birds of America	Hitchhiker	
2010	The Elastic	Marty	Short film
2012	Junction	David	ReelHeart International Film Festival Award for Best Ensemble Cast
2012	Excuse Me for Living	Dan	
2013	Turtle Island	Tim	
2013	Tiger Lily Road	Ricky Harden	
2014	A Cry from Within	Carl	
2015	Anchors	Denny	
2015	The Girl Is in Trouble	Eric	
2015	#Lucky Number	Bret Reynolds	
2015	Blink	Actor	
2017	Sam	Stephen	
2019	Crazy Alien	John Stockton	
2020	Mank	Joseph L. Mankiewicz	
2022	American Murderer	Jason Derek Brown	
2022	Jill	Ted	Bucharest Film Awards for Best Actor Manchester International Film Festival for Best Actor
2022	She Said	Jim Rutman	
2025	Six Sixty Six	Demon Ronnie James (voice)	Short film
TBA	Rooster		Post-production
TBA	Liminal		Filming

=== Television ===
Year	Title	Role	Notes
2003–2009	Guiding Light	Jonathan Randall	154 episodes: October 23, 2003 – February 1, 2007, July 31 – August 2, 2007, January 23 – March 6, 2008, August 5 – September 18, 2009; Daytime Emmy Award for Outstanding Younger Actor in a Drama Series (2006, 2008); Nominated – Daytime Emmy Award for Outstanding Younger Actor in a Drama Series (2005, 2007); Nominated – Gold Derby Award for Younger Actor – Daytime Drama (2006–2007); Nominated – Soap Opera Digest Award for Outstanding Male Newcomer (2005)
2007	The Burg	Douche Bag Dave	Episode: "Out"
2007	Numb3rs	Mike Daley	Episode: "Pandora's Box"
2008	Ghost Whisperer	Brian	Episode: "Ghost in the Machine"
2008	CSI: Miami	Mick Ragosa	Episode: "Wrecking Crew"
2009–2010	As the World Turns	Mick Dante	29 episodes
2009–2016	Law & Order: Special Victims Unit	Various	2 episodes
2010	The Good Wife	Josh Mundy	Episode: "Doubt"
2011	Body of Proof	Dean Avery	Episode: "Talking Heads"
2012	Blue Bloods	Mike Galatis	Episode: "The Uniform"
2013	The Following	Brock	Episode: "Guilt"
2014	Black Box	Joseph Morgan	Episode: "Forget Me"
2015–2016	Banshee	Kurt Bunker	15 episodes
2017	Chicago P.D.	Thomas Cade	Episode: "Favor, Affection, Malice or Ill-Will"
2017–2018	Iron Fist	Ward Meachum	Main role; 21 episodes
2019	Blindspot	Cameron Gibbs	Episode: “Frequently Recurring Struggle for Existence”
2020–2022	Ozark	Ben Davis	Main role (season 3); Guest role (season 4); Nominated – Critics' Choice Television Award for Best Supporting Actor in a Drama Series; Nominated – Primetime Emmy Award for Outstanding Guest Actor in a Drama Series; Nominated – Satellite Award for Best Supporting Actor – Series, Miniseries or Television Film; Nominated – Screen Actors Guild Award for Outstanding Performance by an Ensemble in a Drama Series
2022–2024	Outer Range	Perry Abbott	Main role
2023	Love & Death	Don Crowder	Miniseries
2024	A Man in Full	Raymond Peepgrass	Miniseries
2025	Task	Robbie Prendergrast	6 episodes Primetime Emmy Award for Outstanding Supporting Actor in a Drama Series

=== Video games ===
Year	Title	Voice role
2011	Homefront	Connor J. Morgan

== Awards and nominations ==
Year	Association	Category	Project	Result	Ref.
2005	Daytime Emmy Awards	Outstanding Younger Actor in a Drama Series	Guiding Light	Nominated	
2006	Daytime Emmy Awards	Outstanding Younger Actor in a Drama Series	Guiding Light	Won	
2007	Daytime Emmy Awards	Outstanding Younger Actor in a Drama Series	Guiding Light	Nominated	
2008	Daytime Emmy Awards	Outstanding Younger Actor in a Drama Series	Guiding Light	Won	
2020	Critics' Choice Television Awards	Best Supporting Actor in a Drama Series	Ozark	Nominated	
2020	Satellite Awards	Best Supporting Actor – Series, Miniseries or Television Film	Ozark	Nominated	
2020	Screen Actors Guild Awards	Outstanding Ensemble in a Drama Series	Ozark	Nominated	
2022	Primetime Emmy Awards	Outstanding Guest Actor in a Drama Series	Ozark	Nominated	
2023	Bucharest Film Awards	Best Actor	Jill	Won	
2023	Manchester International Film Festival	Best Actor	Jill	Won	
2026	Critics' Choice Television Awards	Best Supporting Actor in a Drama Series	Task	Nominated	
2026	Primetime Emmy Awards	Outstanding Supporting Actor in a Drama Series	Task	Won	
