= Better Is the End of a Thing Than Its Beginning =

- The Righteous Gemstones episode
- Episode no.: Season 1 Episode 9
- Directed by: Jody Hill
- Written by: John Carcieri; Jeff Fradley; Danny McBride
- Cinematography by: Paul Daley
- Editing by: Justin Bourret
- Original release date: October 13, 2019
- Running time: 51 minutes

Guest appearances
- Toby Huss as Dale Nancy; Scott MacArthur as Scotty; Jade Pettyjohn as Dot Nancy; Mary Hollis Inboden as Mandy; Valyn Hall as Tiffany Freeman; Joshua Mikel as Daedalus; Michael Monsour as Cryptocore; Kelton DuMont as Pontius Gemstone; Gavin Munn as Abraham Gemstone; Marla Maples as Gay Nancy; Dominique Jane Sharpe as Cybergoth; Mary Kraft as Missionary Woman; Cullen Moss as Brock; Jody Hill as Levi; James DuMont as Chad; Troy Anthony Hogan as Matthew; J. LaRose as Gregory

Episode chronology
← Previous "But the Righteous Will See Their Fall"	Next → "I Speak in the Tongues of Men and Angels"

"Better Is the End of a Thing Than Its Beginning" is the ninth episode and season finale of the first season of the American dark comedy crime television series The Righteous Gemstones. The episode was written by executive producers John Carcieri, Jeff Fradley, and series creator Danny McBride, and directed by executive producer Jody Hill. It was released on HBO on October 13, 2019.

The series follows a family of televangelists and megachurch pastors led by widowed patriarch Eli Gemstone. The main focus is Eli and his immature children, Jesse, Kelvin and Judy, all of whom face challenges in their lives. The series premiere introduced a long-running arc where Jesse is blackmailed for an incriminating video, which was revealed to be part of a scheme orchestrated by his estranged son, Gideon. In the episode, Eli is told by his children of all their actions and fires them, making them reconsider their life choices.

According to Nielsen Media Research, the episode was seen by an estimated 0.606 million household viewers and gained a 0.2 ratings share among adults aged 18–49. The episode received critical acclaim, with critics praising the performances, humor, emotional tone, character development and set-up for the next season.

== Plot ==
In a flashback, Aimee-Leigh (Jennifer Nettles) dies in her hospital bed surrounded by her family. As Eli (John Goodman) starts a prayer, they notice that a bee is flying over Aimee-Leigh's body. In their grief, they try to kill the bee while destroying part of the room as hospital staffers stare at them.

In present day, Eli meets with his children. He informs them that the police found the blackmailer's van, with no sign of the money but evidence that it was stolen after it was involved in a car crash. Eli also informs Jesse (Danny McBride) that Kelvin (Adam DeVine) and Judy (Edi Patterson) told him about the blackmail. Jesse accidentally confesses to trying to scare Seasons (Dermot Mulroney), shocking Eli. The children fight each other, with Kelvin being scolded for not acting and Judy for embezzling money from the church. Eli finally decides to fire them from the ministry and leaves in disappointment.

Amber (Cassidy Freeman) informs Jesse that Gideon (Skyler Gisondo) has left for Haiti to do missionary work. Jesse travels there, trying to get him to return. Gideon declines, feeling that nothing will really be solved with his return. When he informs Amber, she tells him to leave their house. After abandoning his duties at the youth center, Kelvin is confronted by Dot (Jade Pettyjohn). She believes that he and Keefe (Tony Cavalero) were a couple, and informs him that he re-joined his satanist friends. Kelvin raids the satanists' compound and releases Keefe from their control, reconciling. That night, BJ (Tim Baltz) visits Judy at her house and both rekindle their relationship.

As Jesse laments his situation at the lake, Kelvin discovers that Billy (Walton Goggins) was involved in the crash as his Jesus statue was found in the scene, and therefore stole the money. They inform Eli about their discovery, proclaiming that he forgives them but "won't forget." They visit Freeman's Gap, and pursue Billy through the field just as it starts raining. Kelvin tackles Billy while Judy punches Tiffany (Valyn Hall) in the face. As Eli confronts Billy, he affirms that Tiffany accidentally killed Scotty and he does not intend to return the money as he was owed. Suddenly, a lightning strikes Billy, knocking him unconscious. Taking him to the main room, he suddenly awakes, stating that he saw Aimee-Leigh in Heaven and she asked him to forgive Eli.

In the aftermath, Billy returns the money and starts a tent evangelism church where he talks about surviving the lightning. Eli convinces Seasons to work with them by giving him Billy's post at the mall church. Jesse bids his sons farewell and leaves for Haiti, reuniting with Gideon to help him in his missionary work.

== Production ==
=== Development ===
In September 2019, HBO confirmed that the episode would be titled "Better Is the End of a Thing Than Its Beginning", and that it would be written by executive producers John Carcieri, Jeff Fradley, and series creator Danny McBride, and directed by executive producer Jody Hill. This was Carcieri's fourth writing credit, Fradley's third writing credit, McBride's ninth writing credit, and Hill's fourth directing credit.

=== Writing ===
According to McBride, the bee was intended to represent different ideas but no one would know what it meant. Whether if it was a religious sign or just a bee, "we just tried to keep it vague."

== Reception ==
=== Viewers ===
In its original American broadcast, "Better Is the End of a Thing Than Its Beginning" was seen by an estimated 0.606 million household viewers with a 0.2 in the 18-49 demographics. This means that 0.2 percent of all households with televisions watched the episode. This was a slight decrease in viewership from the previous episode, which was watched by 0.610 million household viewers with a 0.2 in the 18-49 demographics.

=== Critical reviews ===
"Better Is the End of a Thing Than Its Beginning" received critical acclaim. Kyle Fowle of The A.V. Club gave the episode an "A" grade and wrote, "It always felt like The Righteous Gemstones was going to stick the landing. There was never really any doubt. Across eight episodes, the show managed to maintain a remarkable level of quality. The show hardly ever wavered, balancing its comedy with pathos, thrills, family drama, and instantly infectious musical numbers. Now, there's the finale, 'Better Is The End Of A Thing Than Its Beginning,' an episode that somehow tops everything that came before it."

Nick Harley of Den of Geek gave the episode a perfect 5 star rating out of 5 and wrote, "The Righteous Gemstones unsurprisingly turned out to be a compelling and truly funny comedy, but it also saw McBride and company stretch their abilities and deliver something more ambitious and poignant. What could have been a ruthless takedown of Christianity never really went for cheap shots or easy laughs, meditating instead on family, greed, and honesty. A successful season ended with a heavenly finale. Oddly angelic for this crew."

Kevin Lever of Telltale TV gave the episode a 4 star rating out of 5 and wrote, "The finale is a wonderful reminder that The Righteous Gemstones is one of the weirdest and hysterical shows on television, and that this character-driven comedy is deceptively deeper than initially believed." Dan Jackson of Thrillist wrote, "Even if the first season felt like a contained narrative, it's hard to imagine McBride and the other writers struggling to find new stories to tell. In his closing sermon, Eli spoke of the value in 'rooting for your enemy's salvation,' a task that should prove challenging to even the most righteous Gemstone. Still, it'll be a pleasure to watch them fail."
