= Wicked Lips (The Righteous Gemstones) =

- The Righteous Gemstones episode
- Episode no.: Season 1 Episode 4
- Directed by: Jody Hill
- Written by: John Carcieri; Jeff Fradley; Danny McBride
- Cinematography by: Michael Simmonds
- Editing by: Craig Hayes
- Original release date: September 8, 2019
- Running time: 36 minutes

Guest appearances
- Toby Huss as Dale Nancy; Scott MacArthur as Scotty; Jade Pettyjohn as Dot Nancy; Mary Hollis Inboden as Mandy; Valyn Hall as Tiffany Freeman; Joshua Mikel as Daedalus; Michael Monsour as Cryptocore; Kelton DuMont as Pontius Gemstone; Gavin Munn as Abraham Gemstone; Marla Maples as Gay Nancy; Dominique Jane Sharpe as Cybergoth; Jody Hill as Levi; James DuMont as Chad; Troy Anthony Hogan as Matthew; J. Larose as Gregory

Episode chronology
← Previous "They Are Weak, But He Is Strong"	Next → "Interlude"

"Wicked Lips" is the fourth episode of the first season of the American dark comedy crime television series The Righteous Gemstones. The episode was written by executive producers John Carcieri, Jeff Fradley and series creator Danny McBride, and directed by executive producer Jody Hill. It was released on HBO on September 8, 2019.

The series follows a family of televangelists and megachurch pastors led by widowed patriarch Eli Gemstone. The main focus is Eli and his immature children, Jesse, Kelvin and Judy, all of whom face challenges in their lives. The series premiere introduced a long-running arc where Jesse is blackmailed for an incriminating video. In the episode, Kelvin and Keefe help in guiding the daughter of one of Eli's major donors, while Jesse's friend is caught in an incriminating e-mail.

According to Nielsen Media Research, the episode was seen by an estimated 0.562 million household viewers and gained a 0.2 ratings share among adults aged 18–49. The episode received positive reviews from critics, who praised the humor, character development and performances.

== Plot ==
While walking through the city, Keefe (Tony Cavalero) runs into his former satanist friends. They try to persuade him to join them, but Keefe declines the offer and leaves. Meanwhile, Gideon (Skyler Gisondo) is introduced to the Gemstones' offices and discovers where their money is kept in a vault.

Mandy (Mary Hollis Inboden), the wife of Chad (James DuMont), discloses to her friends that Chad sent many e-mails to Jesse (Danny McBride) and their friends that detailed multiple infidelities. Amber (Cassidy Freeman) brushes it off, causing Mandy to have a mental breakdown. Jesse is pissed off at the revelation, as they all erased their e-mails except for Chad. Dale (Toby Huss) and Gay Nancy (Marla Maples), friends of Eli (John Goodman) and major donors to the church, ask for help in guiding their rebellious teenage daughter, Dot (Jade Pettyjohn). Kelvin (Adam DeVine) and Keefe offer to help her, cleaning her bedroom from any "satanist" signs. Keefe discovers a used condom, and Dot storms away from her horrified parents. After they leave, Kelvin is threatened by Dot's much older boyfriend for cleaning her room.

Jesse and Amber meet with Mandy and Chad at their house, with Jesse explaining that the e-mails are all jokes between their friends, using evidence to prove his points and seemingly convince Mandy. Meanwhile, desperate to prove his worth to the church, Kelvin once again contacts Dot to meet him at a youth center to have fun with other kids. While she shows up, Kelvin and Keefe discover that she has left with her boyfriend for a party hosted by Keefe's satanist friends. As they arrive to confront her, police raid the party. Dot's boyfriend abandons her, but she safely leaves with Kelvin and Keefe when Keefe's friends help them with a secret passageway. After leaving her home, Dot decides to continue attending Kelvin's group.

Gideon informs Scotty (Scott MacArthur) about the vault, as well as that there will be a huge amount of money there in the coming days, and they prepare to raid it. They drive in their van only to be seen by Jesse, who remembers the vehicle as the one from the parking lot. Jesse follows the van with Amber in the co-pilot seat, who is concerned about his plans. Aware that Jesse is following them, Scotty tries to lose them but ends up rolling the van. Scotty and Gideon flee into the woods, with Jesse (unable to see their faces) leaving his car with a gun to confront them, but they manage to escape.

== Production ==
=== Development ===
In August 2019, HBO confirmed that the episode would be titled "Wicked Lips", and that it would be written by executive producers John Carcieri, Jeff Fradley and series creator Danny McBride, and directed by executive producer Jody Hill. This was Carcieri's second writing credit, Fradley's first writing credit, McBride's fourth writing credit, and Hill's first directing credit.

== Reception ==
=== Viewers ===
In its original American broadcast, "Wicked Lips" was seen by an estimated 0.562 million household viewers with a 0.2 in the 18-49 demographics. This means that 0.2 percent of all households with televisions watched the episode. This was a slight increase in viewership from the previous episode, which was watched by 0.530 million household viewers with a 0.2 in the 18-49 demographics.

=== Critical reviews ===
"Wicked Lips" received positive reviews from critics. Kyle Fowle of The A.V. Club gave the episode a "B" grade and wrote, "'Wicked Lips' isn't quite as entertaining as the previous episodes, but it's doing a lot of things right. The way it jumps between tones is particularly enjoyable, as various filmmaking choices point to certain influences and ideas."

Nick Harley of Den of Geek gave the episode a 4 star rating out of 5 and wrote, "Now that we've got up close and personal with most of the other supporting characters, I assume that we'll be getting deep dives on Judy, and most importantly, Eli in the coming episodes. Though the true crime narrative has slowed a bit, the Gemstones world is engrossing enough and the performances are real enough that when shit starts to hit the fan, we'll care about how the fallout impacts each individual member of the family."

Kevin Lever of Telltale TV gave the episode a 3.5 star rating out of 5 and wrote, "'Wicked Lips' is a wake-up call for Amber, and gives supporting players like Cassidy Freeman and Tony Cavalero some time in the spotlight to great effect. The show is getting better with balancing its sizeable cast, giving each a moment to shine on the episode while commenting on how stretching the truth so thin will inevitably cause it to snap." Thomas Alderman of Show Snob praised the episode and highlighted its ending, "Jesse, gun in hand, assures Amber they're friends who he plays 'car pranks with', as the episode ends."
