= And Yet One of You Is a Devil =

- The Righteous Gemstones episode
- Episode no.: Season 1 Episode 7
- Directed by: Jody Hill
- Written by: Kevin Barnett; Chris Pappas; Danny McBride
- Cinematography by: Paul Daley
- Editing by: Sam Seig
- Original air date: September 29, 2019
- Running time: 38 minutes

Guest appearances
- Toby Huss as Dale Nancy; Scott MacArthur as Scotty; Jade Pettyjohn as Dot Nancy; Mary Hollis Inboden as Mandy; Marla Maples as Gay Nancy; Cullen Moss as Brock; Jody Hill as Levi; James DuMont as Chad; Troy Anthony Hogan as Matthew; J. LaRose as Gregory; David Gordon Green as Easter Service Director; Kelton DuMont as Pontius Gemstone; Gavin Munn as Abraham Gemstone; Valyn Hall as Tiffany Freeman

Episode chronology
← Previous "Now the Sons of Eli Were Worthless Men"	Next → "But the Righteous Will See Their Fall"

"And Yet One of You Is a Devil" is the seventh episode of the first season of the American dark comedy crime television series The Righteous Gemstones. The episode was written by Kevin Barnett, Chris Pappas, and series creator Danny McBride, and directed by executive producer Jody Hill. It was released on HBO on September 29, 2019.

The series follows a family of televangelists and megachurch pastors led by widowed patriarch Eli Gemstone. The main focus is Eli and his immature children, Jesse, Kelvin and Judy, all of whom face challenges in their lives. The series premiere introduced a long-running arc where Jesse is blackmailed for an incriminating video, which was revealed to be part of a scheme orchestrated by his estranged son, Gideon. In the episode, Gideon starts having second thoughts about his scheme, while Billy tries to pit Judy against Eli.

According to Nielsen Media Research, the episode was seen by an estimated 0.511 million household viewers and gained a 0.2 ratings share among adults aged 18–49. The episode received extremely positive reviews from critics, who praised the follow-up to the blackmail storyline, humor and tone.

== Plot ==
In a flashback, the Gemstones attend a "power prayer" convention in Atlanta. Gideon (Skyler Gisondo) is disgusted that Jesse (Danny McBride) is recklessly partying with his friends, and decides to film the events by hiding his phone and leaving the room, just as a few women enter the room.

In present day, Scotty (Scott MacArthur) introduces himself to Jesse's family as a friend of Gideon. Scotty manages to get invited to stay, concerning Gideon. Later, they discuss their plan to rob the money, with Scotty also revealing that he still has Jesse's incriminating video, which he will provide to Gideon after the heist. Eli (John Goodman) surprises Jesse and Judy (Edi Patterson) by appointing them new duties; Jesse will deliver the Easter sermon, while Judy will perform one of their mother's songs alongside Billy (Walton Goggins). Kelvin (Adam DeVine) is left disappointed, as he has nothing new this year. When Judy tells Billy, he angrily tells they will not perform for Eli, and will maintain their status at his church. She tells Eli, with him stating his disappointment over her.

Before her performance, Judy gets into a conflict with BJ (Tim Baltz). Fed up, BJ leaves, disclosing that their engagement is over. After delivering the money offering to the vault, Gideon changes his mind and tells Scotty that he will not go forward with his plan. He fights Scotty and retrieves Jesse's tape, leaving him despite being held at gunpoint. That night, Scotty enters the estate and takes his van, which is witnessed by Keefe (Tony Cavalero). Scotty holds Jesse hostage, revealing himself as the blackmailer and telling him that Gideon was involved in their scheme. Gideon tries to save Jesse but is forced to surrender when Scotty threatens to shoot him. As Jesse has no access to the vault, Scotty confronts Eli as well to gain access to the vault. He takes Gideon and Jesse to the vault, tying them together while he escapes with the money.

== Production ==
=== Development ===
In September 2019, HBO confirmed that the episode would be titled "And Yet One of You Is a Devil", and that it would be written by Kevin Barnett, Chris Pappas, and series creator Danny McBride, and directed by executive producer Jody Hill. This was Barnett's first writing credit, Pappas' first writing credit, McBride's seventh writing credit, and Hill's third directing credit.

== Reception ==
=== Viewers ===
In its original American broadcast, "And Yet One of You Is a Devil" was seen by an estimated 0.511 million household viewers with a 0.2 in the 18-49 demographics. This means that 0.2 percent of all households with televisions watched the episode. This was a 8% increase in viewership from the previous episode, which was watched by 0.469 million household viewers with a 0.2 in the 18-49 demographics.

=== Critical reviews ===
"And Yet One of You Is a Devil" received extremely positive reviews from critics. Kyle Fowle of The A.V. Club gave the episode an "A" grade and wrote, "'And Yet One Of You Is A Devil' is one of the best episodes of the season because it's able to delve into ideas about men and cultural expectations while also morphing into a family drama and a high-stakes thriller. It's a balancing act that the show has consistently pulled off this season."

Nick Harley of Den of Geek gave the episode a 4 star rating out of 5 and wrote, "I'm sure next week will begin with a difficult conversation between father and son. Just as the pair were beginning to trust and understand one another, Jesse will have to confront the fact that his son was plotting against him. It's nice that the series didn't drag this reveal out and will give ample time to deal with the fallout of this betrayal. This was a big, funny, and suspenseful episode of Gemstones, highlighting everything that this show has been doing well. Next week is the penultimate episode of season one and there's still a lot of story left to resolve."

Kevin Lever of Telltale TV gave the episode a 4 star rating out of 5 and wrote, "'And Yet One of You is a Devil' is a reminder that despite the show being a comedy, it does not hold back. When things go wrong, they go very wrong. Jesse's mess, and Gideon's revenge, leave them at a total loss now, and more to come from the fallout. While it may have given them what they wanted, it is not permanent, but the fallout coming may be." Thomas Alderman of Show Snob praised Scotty's introduction into the family and possible repercussions, "We venture a short period back in time to Scotty – one of the attempted robbers – joining Jesse and family for dinner."
