= But the Righteous Will See Their Fall =

- The Righteous Gemstones episode
- Episode no.: Season 1 Episode 8
- Directed by: David Gordon Green
- Written by: Kevin Barnett; Chris Pappas; Danny McBride
- Cinematography by: Michael Simmonds
- Editing by: Craig Hayes
- Original release date: October 6, 2019
- Running time: 34 minutes

Guest appearances
- Scott MacArthur as Scotty; Mary Hollis Inboden as Mandy; Valyn Hall as Tiffany Freeman; Jen Kober as Denim; Jody Hill as Levi; James DuMont as Chad; Troy Anthony Hogan as Matthew; J. LaRose as Gregory; Kelton DuMont as Pontius Gemstone; Gavin Munn as Abraham Gemstone

Episode chronology
← Previous "And Yet One of You Is a Devil"	Next → "Better Is the End of a Thing Than Its Beginning"

"But the Righteous Will See Their Fall" is the eighth episode of the first season of the American dark comedy crime television series The Righteous Gemstones. The episode was written by Kevin Barnett, Chris Pappas, and series creator Danny McBride, and directed by executive producer David Gordon Green. It was released on HBO on October 6, 2019.

The series follows a family of televangelists and megachurch pastors led by widowed patriarch Eli Gemstone. The main focus is Eli and his immature children, Jesse, Kelvin and Judy, all of whom face challenges in their lives. The series premiere introduced a long-running arc where Jesse is blackmailed for an incriminating video, which was revealed to be part of a scheme orchestrated by his estranged son, Gideon. In the episode, Gideon faces consequences for his actions, while Jesse decides to open up about the past.

According to Nielsen Media Research, the episode was seen by an estimated 0.610 million household viewers and gained a 0.2 ratings share among adults aged 18–49. The episode received extremely positive reviews from critics, who praised the new changed status of the characters, character development and humor.

== Plot ==
After dropping Judy (Edi Patterson) at her house, Billy (Walton Goggins) drives while receiving oral sex from Tiffany (Valyn Hall). Suddenly, a van crashes into them. While Billy and Tiffany have slight wounds, the driver, Scotty (Scott MacArthur), is knocked unconscious. Inspecting the van, they discover the stolen money and his gun, discovering that he robbed the Gemstone vault. Scotty wakes up and a panicked Tiffany shoots him in the head, killing him. After taking the money, they dump his van in a lake.

Security guards release Jesse (Danny McBride) and Gideon (Skyler Gisondo) from the vault. Eli (John Goodman) confronts Gideon for his actions, as he could've gotten them killed. Gideon takes the blame for the robbery, deeming it the only reason why he returned, not mentioning the tape. A heartbroken Amber (Cassidy Freeman) orders Gideon to leave their house. Billy and Tiffany retrieve their stuff from the prayer center, only to be interrupted by Judy. Billy dismisses her as lacking talent and leaves the town with Tiffany, disappointing Judy.

As Gideon packs his stuff, Jesse talks with him, deeming that Jesse blames himself for everything bad that happened. Despite Jesse trying to make him stay, Gideon chooses to leave. Judy visits BJ (Tim Baltz) at his pharmacy to reconcile, but he is not interested. Judy also takes offense when one of his co-workers delivers him lunch. On her way out, she uses a cart to crash the co-worker's car, getting herself arrested. Distraught over all the events happening, Kelvin (Adam DeVine) orders Keefe (Tony Cavalero) to leave, believing he cannot guide him anymore.

Haunted by Gideon's absence, Jesse meets with his friends and wives. He confesses to the tape, and then shows it to everyone, shocking them. While Jesse maintains they did not have sex, their wives are still disgusted. He tries to talk with Amber, but she angrily starts destroying part of the house. She then takes a rifle and shoots Jesse in the buttocks as he flees the house. Eli arrives at the police station, where he bails Judy out, while Billy and Tiffany return home and celebrate their new income.

== Production ==
=== Development ===
In September 2019, HBO confirmed that the episode would be titled "But the Righteous Will See Their Fall", and that it would be written by Kevin Barnett, Chris Pappas, and series creator Danny McBride, and directed by executive producer David Gordon Green. This was Barnett's second writing credit, Pappas' second writing credit, McBride's eighth writing credit, and Green's fourth directing credit.

== Reception ==
=== Viewers ===
In its original American broadcast, "But the Righteous Will See Their Fall" was seen by an estimated 0.610 million household viewers with a 0.2 in the 18-49 demographics. This means that 0.2 percent of all households with televisions watched the episode. This was a 19% increase in viewership from the previous episode, which was watched by 0.511 million household viewers with a 0.2 in the 18-49 demographics.

=== Critical reviews ===
"But the Righteous Will See Their Fall" received extremely positive reviews from critics. Kyle Fowle of The A.V. Club gave the episode an "A" grade and wrote, "'But The Righteous Will See Their Fall' absolutely nails the trademark Hill/McBride balance of crude and sweet. It's exactly what a penultimate episode should be. It sets up a lot for the finale, while also wrapping up a few stories to clear some room for bigger moments. The chaos is all starting to take a more coherent shape, and the catharsis here is palpable and exciting."

Nick Harley of Den of Geek gave the episode a 4.5 star rating out of 5 and wrote, "Like all the best biblical characters, the Gemstones are tried and tested greatly this week, and these fragile, pampered weirdos don't take trials and tribulations very well. Next week is the season finale, and based on the slowly building crescendo of these last two installments, I'd expect something extra explosive to take place. We already know that Gemstones will be back for Season 2, so perhaps we'll be left with a tantalizing cliffhanger? I guess we'll have to tune in to find out."

Kevin Lever of Telltale TV gave the episode a 4 star rating out of 5 and wrote, "This is their low point. 'But The Righteous Will See Their Fall' brings reality to test the family's faith, and they are not ready to face the realities of their choices." Thomas Alderman of Show Snob highlighted the episode's ending, "Amber shoots Jesse in the buttocks with a rifle following the revelations. To get Judy released from jail, Eli bribes officers. Passing Scottie's recovered truck, Keefe leaves."
