= I Speak in the Tongues of Men and Angels =

- The Righteous Gemstones episode
- Episode no.: Season 2 Episode 1
- Directed by: David Gordon Green
- Written by: Danny McBride
- Cinematography by: Michael Simmonds
- Editing by: Justin Bourret; Todd Zelin
- Original release date: January 9, 2022
- Running time: 50 minutes

Guest appearances
- Wayne Duvall as Glendon Marsh; Victor Williams as Makawon Butterfield; Eric Roberts as Glendon "Junior" Marsh Jr.; Eric André as Lyle Lissons; Jessica Lowe as Lindy Lissons; Jason Schwartzman as Thaniel Block; Miles Burris as Titus; James DuMont as Chad; Kelton DuMont as Pontius Gemstone; Jody Hill as Levi; Troy Anthony Hogan as Matthew; Mary Hollis Inboden as Mandy; Jake Kelley as Young Eli Gemstone; J. LaRose as Gregory; Gavin Munn as Abraham Gemstone; Tommy Nelson as Young Junior Marsh; Brock O'Hurn as Torsten; Renes Rivera as Randall Ray; Thomas Roberts as Anchorman; Kevin E. West as Roy Gemstone

Episode chronology
← Previous "Better Is the End of a Thing Than Its Beginning"	Next → "After I Leave, Savage Wolves Will Come"

"I Speak in the Tongues of Men and Angels" is the first episode of the second season of the American dark comedy crime television series The Righteous Gemstones. It is the tenth overall episode of the series and was written by series creator Danny McBride, and directed by executive producer David Gordon Green. It was released on HBO on January 9, 2022, airing back-to-back with the follow-up episode, "After I Leave, Savage Wolves Will Come".

The series follows a family of televangelists and megachurch pastors led by widowed patriarch Eli Gemstone. The main focus is Eli and his immature children, Jesse, Kelvin and Judy, all of whom face challenges in their lives. The series premiere introduced a long-running arc where Jesse is blackmailed for an incriminating video, which was revealed to be part of a scheme orchestrated by his estranged son, Gideon. In the episode, Eli's past comes back to haunt him, just as Jesse is planning a new partnership.

According to Nielsen Media Research, the episode was seen by an estimated 0.291 million household viewers and gained a 0.1 ratings share among adults aged 18–49. The episode received mostly positive reviews from critics, who praised the flashback sequences, humor, character development and performances.

== Plot ==
=== Flashbacks ===
In Memphis 1968, a wrestler known as "The Maniac Kid" (Jake Kelley) fights and wins against his opponent in the ring. After the fight, Maniac Kid's employer, Glendon Marsh (Wayne Duvall), and his son, Junior (Tommy Nelson), take him to a house. There, Maniac Kid and Junior use masks to sneak in and attack the owner, as he owes money to Glendon. When the man cannot pay, Maniac Kid uses his famous technique of breaking his fingers. Afterwards, he is paid by Glendon for his service, and leaves for his house. The wrestler is revealed to be a young Eli Gemstone, and is confronted by his father, Roy (Kevin E. West), for his constant absences.

=== Present day ===
Eli (John Goodman) attends a meeting with other megachurch pastors, discussing a sex scandal regarding one of its members, Makawon Butterfield (Victor Williams). When the pastors refuse to allow him to continue his activities within their interests, Butterfield jumps out of a window to kill himself. However, the meeting takes place in a second floor, and Butterfield survives while breaking his legs. Butterfield's actions are condemned on TV by Thaniel Block (Jason Schwartzman), a reporter.

Jesse (Danny McBride) and Gideon (Skyler Gisondo) have returned to the United States, with the former reconciling with Amber (Cassidy Freeman). Gideon now works as a videographer for the church, and has been allowed to live in Granddaddy Roy's dilapidated mansion. Eli announces to the public that they are launching a Christian streaming service, GODD. While dining with the family, Kelvin (Adam DeVine) arrives with a Christian bodybuilders group known as "God Squad", although he does not let them or Keefe (Tony Cavalero) accompany him and his family. Jesse informs Eli that he is meeting Lyle and Lindy Lissons, a Texan televangelist couple. Eli is taken aback when Jesse addresses the idea of him dying, leaving to question who will inherit his place.

In Houston, Jesse and Amber meet with Lyle (Eric André) and Lindy (Jessica Lowe) at their church. They want to team on a Christian resort called Zion's Landing, convincing Jesse to accept his offer but requiring Eli to visit the land. Lyle and Lindy guide the Gemstones through the land while explaining their plans. While Eli likes the land, he declines the offer as he does not feel it is the right time. When they return from Florida, Jesse gets into a conflict with Eli, feeling he should retire and allow him to take a chance. Eli then tells him to go forward with the project, but to not let him get involved.

Eli is also approached by Junior (Eric Roberts), who wants to get involved in his life again. Although reluctant at first, Eli accepts to dine with him to catch up. At night, they leave and encounter a man who previously insulted Eli. While Eli wants to avoid the situation, Junior threatens the man, causing him to knock Junior out. When the man attacks Eli, Eli counterattacks with his wrestling moves. Despite the man asking for mercy, Eli breaks his fingers and leaves with Junior.

== Production ==
=== Development ===
In December 2021, HBO confirmed that the episode would be titled "I Speak in the Tongues of Men and Angels", and that it would be written by series creator Danny McBride, and directed by executive producer David Gordon Green. This was McBride's tenth writing credit, and Green's fifth directing credit.

== Reception ==
=== Viewers ===
In its original American broadcast, "I Speak in the Tongues of Men and Angels" was seen by an estimated 0.291 million household viewers with a 0.1 in the 18-49 demographics. This means that 0.1 percent of all households with televisions watched the episode. This was a massive 52% decrease in viewership from the previous episode, which was watched by 0.606 million household viewers with a 0.2 in the 18-49 demographics.

=== Critical reviews ===
"I Speak in the Tongues of Men and Angels" received mostly positive reviews from critics. Mike Vanderbilt of The A.V. Club gave the episode a "B+" grade and wrote, "While McBride's whiplash blending of comedy, drama, and horror does not jibe in his and Green's reboot of the Halloween franchise, when you're dealing with subject matter as way-out as religion, out-of-touch rich people, and the family dynamic, it all feels right on."

Scott Tobias of Vulture gave the episode a 4 star rating out of 5 and wrote, "This episode is bookended by Coen-brothers moments: Butterfield running from a meeting to jump off the balcony is a nod to The Hudsucker Proxy, only he falls two stories rather than 45 floors (not counting the mezzanine), and Goodman's transformation from gentle preacher to violent, thundering beast recalls his salt-of-the-earth insurance man in Barton Fink." Breeze Riley of Telltale TV gave the episode a 4 star rating out of 5 and wrote, "It's hard to not want to compare the Gemstones to another HBO family full of drama and dysfunctional dynamics, the Roys. From Eli as the scrappy patriarch disappointed in his spoiled children to Jesse as the would-be successor feeling stifled by his dad’s control, there are plenty of parallels to explore."

Dylan Roth of The New York Observer wrote, "It's clear the Gemstones have lost none of their luster. This year promises a deeper exploration of the dynamic between the 'New Generation' of the family and their stubborn patriarch Eli, and of Eli himself, all while maintaining the level of bawdy cartoon buffoonery that's made the series a bizarro-world version of Succession." James Preston Poole of Full Circle Cinema gave the episode an 8 out of 10 rating and wrote, "The Righteous Gemstones season 2 premiere does what a good premiere should. It gets us up to speed, does a victory lap for what worked in the first season, and then introduces an intriguing hook for what's to come. It is a smidge disappointing what they're doing with Eric Andre’s character, and I wish we had a little momentum in this episode. Overall, though, it's good to be back in the world of the Gemstones."
