= Is This the Man Who Made the Earth Tremble =

- The Righteous Gemstones episode
- Episode no.: Season 1 Episode 2
- Directed by: David Gordon Green
- Written by: Danny McBride
- Cinematography by: Michael Simmonds
- Editing by: Todd Zelin
- Original release date: August 25, 2019
- Running time: 33 minutes

Guest appearances
- Scott MacArthur as Scotty; Virginia Gardner as Lucy; Kelton DuMont as Pontius Gemstone; Gavin Munn as Abraham Gemstone; Jody Hill as Levi; Troy Anthony Hogan as Matthew; J. Larose as Gregory

Episode chronology
← Previous "The Righteous Gemstones"	Next → "They Are Weak, But He Is Strong"

"Is This the Man Who Made the Earth Tremble" is the second episode of the first season of the American dark comedy crime television series The Righteous Gemstones. The episode was written by series creator and lead actor Danny McBride, and directed by executive producer David Gordon Green. It was released on HBO on August 25, 2019.

The series follows a family of televangelists and megachurch pastors led by widowed patriarch Eli Gemstone. The main focus is Eli and his immature children, Jesse, Kelvin and Judy, all of whom face challenges in their lives. The series premiere introduced a long-running arc where Jesse is blackmailed for an incriminating video. In the episode, the siblings work to retrieve the footage of the night before, while also pursuing the blackmailers, who are still alive.

According to Nielsen Media Research, the episode was seen by an estimated 0.594 million household viewers and gained a 0.2 ratings share among adults aged 18–49. The episode received mostly positive reviews from critics, who praised the humor, character development and twist ending.

== Plot ==
Before meeting with Jesse (Danny McBride), the man in the devil mask, Scotty (Scott MacArthur), talks with the driver in the red van, with the latter revealed as a woman named Lucy (Virginia Gardner). It is then revealed that a third blackmailer is with them in the back of the van. After the Gemstones run them over and flee the parking lot, the third blackmailer (Skyler Gisondo) exits the van to tend to a wounded Scotty. They dump Lucy's body on a field only to discover that Lucy is still alive, so the blackmailer takes his injured accomplices to the hospital.

Jesse is angry to discover that Gideon contacted Amber (Cassidy Freeman), as he does not want him back in their lives. He is also worried as a CCTV camera saw the events of the night before. Jesse has his buddies harass and attack a store owner to retrieve the CCTV footage. He then shows the footage to Kelvin (Adam DeVine) and Judy (Edi Patterson), revealing that the blackmailers are not dead and that there was a third man in the van. Kelvin suggests using the streetlights' cameras to follow the van's route. At a motel, Scotty intends to continue blackmailing Jesse, but Lucy loses faith in their plan and abandons them. Scotty and the blackmailer then engage in a brutal fight, but the blackmailer's martial arts knowledge gives him the upper hand. The blackmailer claims he can get the money.

Jesse, Judy and Kelvin get help from Keefe (Tony Cavalero) in tracking the car to the motel room. However, by the time they arrive, the blackmailers have already left. At his house, Eli (John Goodman) discovers a snake in his kitchen, and he easily tames it. Per Amber's request, Jesse makes a prayer, asking for guidance in his life. His prayer is interrupted by the arrival of the blackmailer, who is revealed to be Gideon.

== Production ==
=== Development ===
In July 2019, HBO confirmed that the episode would be titled "Is This the Man Who Made the Earth Tremble", and that it would be written by series creator Danny McBride and directed by executive producer David Gordon Green. This was McBride's second writing credit, and Green's first directing credit.

== Reception ==
=== Viewers ===
In its original American broadcast, "Is This the Man Who Made the Earth Tremble" was seen by an estimated 0.594 million household viewers with a 0.2 in the 18-49 demographics. This means that 0.2 percent of all households with televisions watched the episode. This was a slight increase in viewership from the previous episode, which was watched by 0.593 million household viewers with a 0.2 in the 18-49 demographics.

=== Critical reviews ===
"Is This the Man Who Made the Earth Tremble" received mostly positive reviews from critics. Kyle Fowle of The A.V. Club gave the episode an "A–" grade and wrote, "Directed by David Gordon Green, this episode broadens the scope of The Righteous Gemstones immediately, and the opening scene is a perfect example of what makes the team of Green, Jody Hill, and Danny McBride click. It's a scene that beautifully encapsulates the wild swings in tone that the show goes for."

Nick Harley of Den of Geek gave the episode a 4 star rating out of 5 and wrote, "From the minute that a third blackmailer is revealed in the second episode of The Righteous Gemstones, 'Is This the Man that Made the Earth Tremble,' it seems pretty obvious that the unnamed masked man is Jesse's wayward son Gideon. Mainly, that's because the other two masked and critically injured extortionists are named while the third conspicuously isn't, but also, it's because of Gideon's youthful appearance. Still, even though the installment's final reveal is highly telegraphed, it doesn't take away from the episode, which surprisingly continues as a twisted true crime tale rather than the strictly religious satire that was advertised."

Kevin Lever of Telltale TV gave the episode a 4 star rating out of 5 and wrote, "'Is This the Man Who Made the Earth Tremble' is a solid continuation, its focus on Gideon leaving Eli a little on the sidelines as the blackmail story closes out and becomes something new. But it's a sign the show is not going to be a simple comedy of a corrupted family; it's going to take some interesting risks and show something new." Thomas Alderman of Show Snob wrote, "Another brilliantly acted, designed written and produced show from HBO is well underway here – and with very funny results."
