= For Their Nakedness Is Your Own Nakedness =

- The Righteous Gemstones episode
- Episode no.: Season 3 Episode 3
- Directed by: Danny McBride
- Written by: Kevin Barnett; Danny McBride; Chris Pappas
- Cinematography by: Paul Daley
- Editing by: Justin Bourret
- Original release date: June 25, 2023
- Running time: 34 minutes

Guest appearances
- Kristen Johnston as May–May Montgomery; Lukas Haas as Chuck Montgomery; Valyn Hall as Tiffany Freeman; Walton Goggins as Baby Billy Freeman; Gavin Munn as Abraham Gemstone; Robert Oberst as Karl Montgomery; Mary Hollis Inboden as Mandy

Episode chronology
← Previous "But Esau Ran to Meet Him"	Next → "I Have Not Come to Bring Peace, But a Sword"

"For Their Own Nakedness Is Your Own Nakedness" is the third episode of the third season of the American dark comedy crime television series The Righteous Gemstones. It is the 21st overall episode of the series and was written by Kevin Barnett, series creator Danny McBride, and Chris Pappas, and directed by McBride. It was released on HBO on June 25, 2023, and also was available on Max on the same date.

The series follows a family of televangelists and megachurch pastors led by widowed patriarch Eli Gemstone. The main focus is Eli and his immature children, Jesse, Kelvin and Judy, all of whom face challenges in their lives. The series depicts the family's past and scandals, which unleash consequences. In the episode, the Gemstones decide to integrate Karl and Chuck more into their lives, while Baby Billy returns with a new plan to regain fame.

According to Nielsen Media Research, the episode was seen by an estimated 0.219 million household viewers and gained a 0.05 ratings share among adults aged 18–49. The episode received extremely positive reviews from critics, who praised McBride's directing, character development and uplifting tone compared to other episodes.

== Plot ==
Baby Billy (Walton Goggins) now performs at Zion's Landing, where the crowd does not take any interest in him. He has relocated with a pregnant Tiffany (Valyn Hall) and Lionel at a hotel, lamenting his past-his-time career. Inspired by Family Feud, he decides that he needs to host a game show.

Karl (Robert Oberst) and Chuck (Lukas Haas) now live at the Gemstone compound, and refuse to go back with May–May (Kristen Johnston). Eli (John Goodman) instructs his children in taking care of them, despite their reluctance. Karl and Chuck annoy Jesse (Danny McBride) when they find his old monster truck, with Jesse threatening to never go anywhere near it again. Judy (Edi Patterson) is also frustrated when Amber (Cassidy Freeman) leaves a marriage therapy session recording at their house after being told of her affair with Stephen, feeling she is humiliating her and BJ (Tim Baltz). She confronts her at the church, telling her to mind her own business.

Billy proposes a game show, Baby Billy's Bible Bonkers, to Jesse, Judy and Kelvin (Adam DeVine). They reject it, as the project is extremely reminiscent of Family Feud. As the Gemstones stay at a cabin for a "Cousins Night", Billy interrupts the meeting to display his game show. Conflict soon arises when Jesse loses to Chuck during a trivia question, during which they insult their respective families. Jesse and Chuck prepare to fight with knives, when Karl accidentally chokes while eating. The family works together to save him. Realizing they lack proper care, Jesse offers to take them home. While leaving with Tiffany, Billy is confident that his game show will be picked up. Seeing the poor conditions under which May–May lives, Eli decides to help her in cleaning her church.

== Production ==
=== Development ===
The episode was written by Kevin Barnett, series creator Danny McBride, and Chris Pappas, and directed by McBride. This was Barnett's fourth writing credit, McBride's 21st writing credit, Pappas' fourth writing credit, and McBride's third directing credit.

=== Music ===
The episode featured a sequence where Baby Billy performs "Pay Day", which is a version of a similar song by Red Sovine. Walton Goggins described the scene as "The words to that song are very much who he is and what he believes: That if he keeps fighting the good fight, eventually his stars will align and he will also be worthy of celebration."

== Reception ==
=== Viewers ===
In its original American broadcast, "For Their Nakedness Is Your Own Nakedness" was seen by an estimated 0.219 million household viewers with a 0.05 in the 18-49 demographics. This means that 0.05 percent of all households with televisions watched the episode. This was a slight decrease in viewership from the previous episode, which was watched by 0.223 million household viewers with a 0.07 in the 18-49 demographics.

=== Critical reviews ===
"For Their Nakedness Is Your Own Nakedness" received extremely positive reviews from critics. Matt Schimkowitz of The A.V. Club gave the episode an "A–" grade and wrote, "As only McBride could do, the episode's title, 'For Their Nakedness Is Your Own Nakedness,' comes from the Bible verse forbidding incest, which writers McBride, Kevin Barnett, and Chris Pappas recontextualize into an episode about a family member's vulnerabilities being the whole clan's responsibility. Following two episodes of family feuds, McBride directs one about making mends over sausage dip in what might be the show's sweetest episode to date."

Scott Tobias of Vulture gave the episode a 4 star rating out of 5 and wrote, "The Righteous Gemstones is a raucous satire of the unholy union of capitalism and religion, as well as all-American greed, hypocrisy, vulgarity, stupidity, violence, and alpha-male braggadocio. Yet it is also, at times, a disarmingly sincere show about family values. Those values may be obscene and debased much of the time and the family wildly dysfunctional, but among the Gemstones, there are no sins that cannot be forgiven." Breeze Riley of Telltale TV gave the episode a 4 star rating out of 5 and wrote, "This episode is relatively quiet in terms of the external threats the family is facing, with the church dissidents, cousins' father, and Judy's ex-lover all only referenced. All of those potential catastrophes loom in the distance though, meaning there are still some stakes. It's only a matter of time until poor BJ's heart is broken, and mine will be broken for him."
