= Now the Sons of Eli Were Worthless Men =

- The Righteous Gemstones episode
- Episode no.: Season 1 Episode 6
- Directed by: Jody Hill
- Written by: Grant Dekernion; Danny McBride; Edi Patterson
- Cinematography by: Michael Simmonds; Paul Daley
- Editing by: Todd Zelin
- Original release date: September 22, 2019
- Running time: 35 minutes

Guest appearances
- Scott MacArthur as Scotty; Jody Hill as Levi; James DuMont as Chad; Troy Anthony Hogan as Matthew; J. LaRose as Gregory; Valyn Hall as Tiffany Freeman; Cullen Moss as Brock; Kelton DuMont as Pontius Gemstone; Gavin Munn as Abraham Gemstone

Episode chronology
← Previous "Interlude"	Next → "And Yet One of You Is a Devil"

"Now the Sons of Eli Were Worthless Men" is the sixth episode of the first season of the American dark comedy crime television series The Righteous Gemstones. The episode was written by Grant Dekernion, series creator Danny McBride, and cast member Edi Patterson, and directed by executive producer Jody Hill. It was released on HBO on September 22, 2019.

The series follows a family of televangelists and megachurch pastors led by widowed patriarch Eli Gemstone. The main focus is Eli and his immature children, Jesse, Kelvin and Judy, all of whom face challenges in their lives. The series premiere introduced a long-running arc where Jesse is blackmailed for an incriminating video. In the episode, Judy wants to get more involved into the family business, while Jesse finds more about the blackmailers.

According to Nielsen Media Research, the episode was seen by an estimated 0.469 million household viewers and gained a 0.2 ratings share among adults aged 18–49. The episode received positive reviews from critics, who praised the humor, character development and performances, particularly Edi Patterson.

== Plot ==
After retrieving the van, Jesse (Danny McBride) meets with Kelvin (Adam DeVine) and Judy (Edi Patterson), keeping the van in Kelvin's garage. He refers to the incident as a "prank" to Amber (Cassidy Freeman), and both find that Gideon (Skyler Gisondo) was hurt in the face, unaware that he was involved in the van.

Judy is angered that Eli (John Goodman) does not trust her in significant activities for the families, feeling that she is overshadowed by Jesse and Kelvin. Billy (Walton Goggins) invites her to sing at her church, giving her the job after she performs "This Little Light of Mine". When she tells Eli, he affirms that Billy is only using her against him. Jesse and Kelvin meet with Jesse's friends, revealing that the van consisted mostly of junk, concluding that the blackmailers are not professional. Scotty (Scott MacArthur) calls them, threatening into returning the van. Jesse refuses to do so, stating that now he has nothing against them and insults him before hanging up.

Eli confronts Billy at the prayer center, accusing him of using Judy. Billy compares the situation to Aimee-Leigh, saying that Eli provoked this chain of events. Billy introduces Judy as "Judy-Leigh" and both perform "Misbehavin'" while Eli looks on in the distance. Although panicked at first, Judy manages to impress the audience. Jesse decides to open up more to Gideon and invites him to participate in a family photo shoot. Later, Gideon is called by the security guards, as Scotty has introduces himself as a friend of his and wants to enter the estate. Alarmed, he allows him to enter.

== Production ==
=== Development ===
In August 2019, HBO confirmed that the episode would be titled "Now the Sons of Eli Were Worthless Men", and that it would be written by Grant Dekernion, series creator Danny McBride, and cast member Edi Patterson, and directed by executive producer Jody Hill. This was Dekernion's first writing credit, McBride's sixth writing credit, Patterson's first writing credit, and Hill's second directing credit.

== Reception ==
=== Viewers ===
In its original American broadcast, "Now the Sons of Eli Were Worthless Men" was seen by an estimated 0.469 million household viewers with a 0.2 in the 18-49 demographics. This means that 0.2 percent of all households with televisions watched the episode. This was a 17% decrease in viewership from the previous episode, which was watched by 0.560 million household viewers with a 0.2 in the 18-49 demographics.

=== Critical reviews ===
"Now the Sons of Eli Were Worthless Men" received positive reviews from critics. Kyle Fowle of The A.V. Club gave the episode a "B+" grade and wrote, "Eli's always assumed his boys were the ones that needed to be watched, because they were the most likely to disappoint him. But in doing so, he neglected his daughter, Judy, and 'Now The Sons Of Eli Were Worthless Men' shows that she's the one with the power to divide the Gemstones. 'Now The Sons' might be the funniest episode of the season so far."

Nick Harley of Den of Geek gave the episode a 3.5 star rating out of 5 and wrote, "Past the halfway point, The Righteous Gemstones has been an entertaining family comedy so far, but it'll need to kick its true crime material into high gear if it's going to execute the landing. We know that the series will be back for Season 2, so there's plenty of time to get the balance right, but as of right now, the family material is being executed with much more thought and grace than the other stuff. Hopefully Scotty's surprise visit to the Gemstone compound leads to fireworks next week."

Kevin Lever of Telltale TV gave the episode a 4 star rating out of 5 and wrote, "But as a showcase episode for Judy Gemstone, the episode is a reminder of the solid cast that is not always in the spotlight, and provides some strange character traits along the way. Everything may be looking good for now, but there will likely be a reckoning to bring everyone down from the clouds." Thomas Alderman of Show Snob highlighted the change in the status quo, "Over at the Locust Grove church, most of the congregation has moved to The Righteous Gemstones' establishment. And therefore the smaller will downgrade further."
