= They Are Weak, But He Is Strong =

- The Righteous Gemstones episode
- Episode no.: Season 1 Episode 3
- Directed by: David Gordon Green
- Written by: Danny McBride; John Carcieri
- Cinematography by: Michael Simmonds
- Editing by: Sam Seig
- Original release date: September 1, 2019
- Running time: 36 minutes

Guest appearances
- Scott MacArthur as Scotty; Kelton DuMont as Pontius Gemstone; Gavin Munn as Abraham Gemstone; Valyn Hall as Tiffany Freeman; Jody Hill as Levi; James DuMont as Chad; Troy Anthony Hogan as Matthew; J. Larose as Gregory

Episode chronology
← Previous "Is This the Man Who Made the Earth Tremble"	Next → "Wicked Lips"

"They Are Weak, But He Is Strong" is the third episode of the first season of the American dark comedy crime television series The Righteous Gemstones. The episode was written by series creator Danny McBride and executive producer John Carcieri, and directed by executive producer David Gordon Green. It was released on HBO on September 1, 2019.

The series follows a family of televangelists and megachurch pastors led by widowed patriarch Eli Gemstone. The main focus is Eli and his immature children, Jesse, Kelvin and Judy, all of whom face challenges in their lives. The series premiere introduced a long-running arc where Jesse is blackmailed for an incriminating video. In the episode, Aimee-Leigh's brother, Baby Billy Freeman, is introduced as he prepares to reunite with his strained family.

According to Nielsen Media Research, the episode was seen by an estimated 0.530 million household viewers and gained a 0.2 ratings share among adults aged 18–49. The episode received mostly positive reviews from critics, who praised its humor, performances and the introduction of the character Baby Billy Freeman.

== Plot ==
Aimee-Leigh's brother, "Baby" Billy Freeman (Walton Goggins), decides to meet with the Gemstones despite their strained relationship following her death. He meets with them at their newly inaugurated church at Locust Grove Mall and introduces them to his young, childish wife, Tiffany (Valyn Hall). Eli offers Baby Billy a job as the pastor of the new church, which he accepts. After the service, Eli (John Goodman) finds that Seasons (Dermot Mulroney) has thrown pamphlets highlighting the family's scandals everywhere.

Since his return, Gideon (Skyler Gisondo) has tried to bond with his family, but Jesse (Danny McBride) still resents him for leaving them for Los Angeles to become a stuntman, at which he failed. Gideon also meets with Scotty (Scott MacArthur), who is not interested in the Gemstones' possessions and wants money instead. Eli and Baby Billy confront Seasons at his church, where tensions arise. Eli then shatters a window at the steeple church before storming off. Eli and Baby Billy then argue at the Salvation Center and Baby Billy quits, intending to go back to his home at Freeman's Gap.

During family dinner, Eli announces that Baby Billy has left and that he believes no one respects him following Aimee-Leigh's death. Pontius (Kelton DuMont) then makes a rude remark to Jesse, who sends him upstairs. Jesse then blames the family's troubles on Gideon leaving and walks out as well. Afterward, Kelvin (Adam DeVine) and Judy (Edi Patterson) meet with Eli outside, where all of them bond over their struggles, deciding that they need to stay together and fix the situation with Baby Billy. Eli decides to go apologize to Baby Billy.

While retrieving his cutouts from the Locust Grove church, Baby Billy and Tiffany witness assailants break in. The assailants vandalize the sanctuary and are forced to surrender when Eli arrives with a gun. Deducing that Seasons sent them, Eli decides not to call the police. Instead, he forces the assailants to undress and run through the mall in order to send Seasons a message. Sorely in need of money and now believing that he may be able to blackmail Eli, Baby Billy decides to stay on at the church.

== Production ==
=== Development ===
In July 2019, HBO confirmed that the episode would be titled "They Are Weak, But He Is Strong", and that it would be written by series creator and lead actor Danny McBride and executive producer John Carcieri, and directed by executive producer David Gordon Green. This was McBride's third writing credit, Carcieri's first writing credit, and Green's second directing credit.

== Reception ==
=== Viewers ===
In its original American broadcast, "They Are Weak, But He Is Strong" was seen by an estimated 0.530 million household viewers with a 0.2 in the 18-49 demographics. This means that 0.2 percent of all households with televisions watched the episode. This was a 11% decrease in viewership from the previous episode, which was watched by 0.594 million household viewers with a 0.2 in the 18-49 demographics.

=== Critical reviews ===
"They Are Weak, But He Is Strong" received mostly positive reviews from critics. Kyle Fowle of The A.V. Club gave the episode a "B+" grade and wrote, "'They Are Weak, But He Is Strong' continues the streak of the show indulging different tendencies and tones, while grounding it all in the slightly turned up absurdity that makes the show such a solid black comedy so far."

Nick Harley of Den of Geek gave the episode a 4 star rating out of 5 and wrote, "If the Righteous Gemstones has more aces up its sleeve like Baby Billy, then we could really be in for something special here. With the flashes of genuine heart and the extensive world-building, Gemstones is adding delicious layers to its twisty Fargo-esque crime story. McBride and his brain trust clearly know what they're doing here, and I can't wait for the Gemstones' world to sprawl out even further."

Kevin Lever of Telltale TV gave the episode a 4 star rating out of 5 and wrote, "Something 'They Are Weak, But He Is Strong' manages to convey is that despite disappointment, despite the scheming, there is a closeness behind all of the snide remarks. The family has each other's backs, Baby Billy included. They will need each other, with Reverend Seasons and Gideon both having plans of their own." Thomas Alderman of Show Snob wrote, "The brothers-in-law reconsider their differences as the episode ends. An amazingly fitting but unintentionally comedic song accompanies the end credits."
