= Interlude (The Righteous Gemstones) =

- The Righteous Gemstones episode
- Episode no.: Season 1 Episode 5
- Directed by: David Gordon Green
- Written by: John Carcieri; Jeff Fradley; Danny McBride
- Cinematography by: Michael Simmonds; Paul Daley
- Editing by: Justin Bourret
- Original release date: September 15, 2019
- Running time: 41 minutes

Guest appearances
- J. Gaven Wilde as Young Jesse Gemstone; Emma Shannon as Young Judy Gemstone

Episode chronology
← Previous "Wicked Lips"	Next → "Now the Sons of Eli Were Worthless Men"

"Interlude" is the fifth episode of the first season of the American dark comedy crime television series The Righteous Gemstones. The episode was written by executive producers John Carcieri, Jeff Fradley and series creator Danny McBride, and directed by executive producer David Gordon Green. It was released on HBO on September 15, 2019.

The series follows a family of televangelists and megachurch pastors led by widowed patriarch Eli Gemstone. The main focus is Eli and his immature children, Jesse, Kelvin and Judy, all of whom face challenges in their lives. The series premiere introduced a long-running arc where Jesse is blackmailed for an incriminating video. The episode is set in 1989, and follows Eli and Aimee-Leigh as they announce her pregnancy, which disrupts Billy's plan for a reunion tour. John Goodman, Jennifer Nettles, and Walton Goggins are the only main cast members to appear in the episode.

According to Nielsen Media Research, the episode was seen by an estimated 0.560 million household viewers and gained a 0.2 ratings share among adults aged 18–49. The episode received extremely positive reviews from critics, who praised the episode's focus on the past, character development and performances.

== Plot ==
In 1989, Eli (John Goodman) and Aimee-Leigh (Jennifer Nettles) prepare for a performance at their studio. Before starting, Aimee-Leigh discloses to Eli that she is pregnant, surprising him. They later inform the young Jesse (J. Gavin Wilde) and Judy (Emma Shannon) about the pregnancy, which they do not take well. Eli struggles in raising his kids, as he is preoccupied with his plans to expand their land territory.

Aimee-Leigh's brother, Billy (Walton Goggins), is planning a reunion tour for their childhood song-and-dance act. He is disappointed when Aimee-Leigh announces her pregnancy, which will force them to cancel the tour. At Judy's birthday party, Billy crashes the event and gives her an expensive toy car, earning Eli's disapproval. He then questioning Eli's decisions while privately giving beer to Jesse. A drunk Jesse throws a tantrum and confronts Eli in front of everyone, stating his displeasure about the baby. Jesse throws up and later confesses that Billy supplied him with the beer.

Aimee-Leigh then visits Billy to talk about his actions; Billy states he needs the tour because of his financial struggles and decaying popularity. When she reiterates that the tour is not happening, Billy claims he will have to sell off pieces of the family farm. After considering it, she reluctantly agrees to go on tour with Billy, which disappoints Eli. They announce their tour during a live performance in which they play their most popular song, "Misbehavin'". Later on, while dining, Billy confesses to Aimee-Leigh that he already sold part of the family's territory. This angers Aimee-Leigh, as she feels he broke his promise. Despite having signed contracts, Aimee-Leigh decides to cancel her part in the tour.

That night, Jesse apologizes to Eli for his actions and is told that if he cannot love his new brother, he must still pretend to do it in order to maintain a healthy relationship. The next day, Billy confronts Eli, blaming him for pressuring Aimee-Leigh to cancel the tour. Billy swears revenge on Eli, promising that the family's legacy will die on the day Aimee-Leigh dies. In present day, Billy listens to "Misbehavin'" in his car while parked outside the Gemstone Prayer Center, while Eli visits Aimee-Leigh's memorial.

== Production ==
=== Development ===
In August 2019, HBO confirmed that the episode would be titled "Interlude", and that it would be written by executive producers John Carcieri, Jeff Fradley and series creator Danny McBride, and directed by executive producer David Gordon Green. This was Carcieri's third writing credit, Fradley's second writing credit, McBride's fifth writing credit, and Green's third directing credit.

=== Music ===
The episode introduced "Misbehavin'", a song that was the catalyst for Aimee-Leigh's and Billy's careers. Danny McBride wasn't originally planning on making a flashback episode, but decided that the episode would require a musical number, which was teased in the first episode when the song's title was seen. The song was conceived by McBride, Edi Patterson and Joseph Stephens. McBride wanted the song to feel like a "gospel truth", saying "nailing that stuff with authenticity and dispensing those songs as though they're real, that to us solidifies the idea that the Gemstones are successful because they're good at what they do and what they provide. Having those musical performances be on point was kind of essential for us."

== Reception ==
=== Viewers ===
In its original American broadcast, "Interlude" was seen by an estimated 0.560 million household viewers with a 0.2 in the 18-49 demographics. This means that 0.2 percent of all households with televisions watched the episode. This was a slight decrease in viewership from the previous episode, which was watched by 0.562 million household viewers with a 0.2 in the 18-49 demographics.

=== Critical reviews ===
"Interlude" received extremely positive reviews from critics. Kyle Fowle of The A.V. Club gave the episode an "A–" grade and wrote, "'Interlude' is a great use of flashback because it informs the present-day storylines in a meaningful way. The flashback isn't just a vehicle for jokes and nostalgia, but rather a surprisingly emotional dive into the dynamic of this family. There's a lot of layers here, both in the personal relationships and how the Gemstones have risen from their more humble beginnings, perhaps losing sight of their mission along the way."

Nick Harley of Den of Geek gave the episode a 4 star rating out of 5 and wrote, "Though I'm anxious to get back to the action that propelled The Righteous Gemstones' pilot, 'Interlude' showed genuine heart and helped color in the history of these characters, explaining how we got to where we're at today. I'm sure we'll be seeing more flashbacks in the future, because Aimee-Leigh is just too compelling of a character to not revisit, and we have to learn more about her passing. Something tells me Eli and Baby Billy's feud is caught up in that as well."

Kevin Lever of Telltale TV gave the episode a 4 star rating out of 5 and wrote, "'Interlude' breaks up the pace and allows us a window into different times. It's a heart-warming episode with a hint of tragedy placed over it, knowing that these good times aren't going to last forever. Aimee-Leigh is that warmth that holds the episode tight, and shows that the Gemstones weren't always so jaded." Thomas Alderman of Show Snob praised the episode's exploration of family issues, "Dr. Eli Gemstone is challenged over his suggestions to his partner by Baby Billy, who believes that his brother-in-law never liked him."
