= The Righteous Gemstones =

American comedy TV series

- Genre: Comedy-drama; Crime
- Created by: Danny McBride
- Starring: Danny McBride; Adam DeVine; Edi Patterson; Tony Cavalero; Cassidy Freeman; Gregory Alan Williams; Tim Baltz; John Goodman; Skyler Gisondo; Dermot Mulroney; Walton Goggins; Jennifer Nettles; M. Emmet Walsh
- Opening theme: "Requiem" by Hector Berlioz
- Composer: Joseph Stephens
- Country of origin: United States
- Original language: English
- No. of seasons: 4
- No. of episodes: 36

Production
- Executive producers: Jody Hill; David Gordon Green; Danny McBride; John Carcieri; Jeff Fradley; Brandon James
- Producers: J. David Brightbill; S. Scott Clackum
- Running time: 29–60 minutes
- Production companies: Rough House Pictures; HBO Entertainment

Original release
- Network: HBO
- Release: August 18, 2019 – May 4, 2025

The Righteous Gemstones is an American crime comedy-drama television series created by Danny McBride that premiered on August 18, 2019, on HBO. The series follows a famous and dysfunctional family of televangelists. McBride also stars in the series, alongside Adam DeVine, Edi Patterson, Tony Cavalero, Cassidy Freeman, Gregory Alan Williams, Tim Baltz, and John Goodman. The series concluded on May 4, 2025, after airing four seasons and 36 episodes. It received positive reviews from critics.

== Premise ==
The Righteous Gemstones depicts a family of South Carolina-based televangelists and megachurch pastors led by widowed patriarch Eli Gemstone. Eli and his immature adult children, Jesse, Judy, and Kelvin, lead opulent lives funded by the church.

In the first season, Eli's estranged brother-in-law, Baby Billy Freeman, is brought in to lead the Gemstones' new shopping-mall-based satellite church, which leads to a conflict with Rev. John Wesley Seasons, whose smaller, neighboring church is threatened. Concurrently, a trio of masked figures blackmail Jesse with a scandalous video documenting the lewd behavior of him and his best friends.

In the second season, Jesse and Amber partner with Texas megachurch leaders Lyle and Lindy Lissons to develop a Christian timeshare resort. The family faces threats, including investigative journalist Thaniel Block, an old friend from Eli's past, and a mysterious group of motorcycle-riding assassins.

In the third season, Eli scales back his involvement in the church, handing over greater control to his children. Eli's impoverished sister, May–May, resurfaces, asking for his assistance in keeping her family safe from her ex-husband, Peter, a vengeful Christian militia leader who holds a decades-long grudge against the Gemstones. Meanwhile, betrayals threaten to end the relationships of Judy and BJ and Kelvin and Keefe.

In the fourth and final season, the Gemstone children continue to lead the church amidst their turbulent personal lives: Jesse struggles to leave a lasting legacy and keep control of his rebelling sons, while Judy must care for a depressed BJ after he is injured in a pole-dancing accident. Having entered into a romantic relationship with Keefe, Kelvin gains prominence after creating PRISM, an LGBT-friendly ministry. However, things spiral completely out of control for the Gemstones when a lonely Eli enters into a relationship with Lori Milsap, a close friend of Aimee-Leigh. The origins of the Gemstone empire, led by outlaw-turned-reluctant preacher Elijah Gemstone, are likewise explored.

== Cast and characters ==
=== Main ===
- Danny McBride as Jesse Gemstone, Eli's oldest son and associate pastor of the Gemstone Salvation Center. Although appearing to be a faithful father and husband, Jesse barely conceals a crude and arrogant personality and a debauched lifestyle, which he often partakes in with his "gang" of friends and subordinates.
- Adam DeVine as Kelvin Gemstone, Eli's youngest son and youth pastor of the Gemstone Salvation Center. Kelvin strives to prove himself as a leader, despite his immaturity and impulsiveness.
- Edi Patterson as Judy Gemstone, Eli's daughter. Judy, the middle child, often feels underestimated by her family as she tries to follow in her mother's footsteps as a singer and star of the church's services. She is prone to inappropriate behavior and angry outbursts.
- Tony Cavalero as Keefe Chambers, Kelvin's assistant, an ex-Satanist who helps with the youth ministry.
- Cassidy Freeman as Amber Gemstone, Jesse's wife who projects the image of a supportive and loving spouse. She encourages Jesse's ambitions to take more control of the church while privately struggling with his negative qualities. She is an Olympic markswoman.
- Greg Alan Williams as Martin Imari, Eli's right-hand-man and the Gemstones' accountant who is often entrusted with the day-to-day operations of the church and cleaning up after the family's scandals.
- Tim Baltz as Benjamin Jason "BJ" Barnes, Judy's sensitive and mediocre fiancé, and later, husband. He is often intimidated by Judy, although it's apparent that he really loves her. BJ works in an optometrist's office in a local grocery store. He's looked down on by the rest of the family for his odd actions and for being raised by liberal atheists.
- John Goodman as Dr. Elijah "Eli" Gemstone II, the patriarch of the Gemstone family and lead pastor of the Gemstone Salvation Center. Eli is a widower, having lost his wife, Aimee-Leigh, one year prior to the start of the series. Although not as openly greedy and vulgar as his children, Eli often prioritizes his own wealth and status ahead of spirituality.
- Skyler Gisondo as Gideon Gemstone, Jesse's oldest son, who moved to California to be a stunt performer, an act that Jesse considered to be a betrayal. Gideon later reconciles with his family and returns to work for the church. He is a skilled martial artist and stunt driver.
- Dermot Mulroney as Rev. John Wesley Seasons (season 1), a pastor of a much smaller congregation, forced to compete with the Gemstones' new church in Locust Grove.
- Walton Goggins as Baby Billy Freeman (season 1, recurring seasons 2–4), Eli's brother-in-law and brother of the deceased Aimee-Leigh Gemstone. A faded child star who was once part of a Gospel song-and-dance double-act with his sister, Baby Billy is a habitual liar whose financial dependence, bad influence on Jesse and Judy, and tendency to abandon his loved ones strained his relationship with the Gemstones. Baby Billy resides at Freeman's Gap, his and Aimee-Leigh's childhood home in the Appalachian Mountains, with his much younger wife Tiffany.
- Jennifer Nettles as Aimee-Leigh Gemstone, Eli's deceased wife and the mother of Jesse, Judy, and Kelvin. She appears in flashbacks, hallucinations, and as a ghost.
- M. Emmet Walsh (Note: Walsh appears in only two episodes but is credited with the main cast.) as Grandaddy Roy Gemstone (seasons 1–2), Eli's father

=== Recurring ===
- Valyn Hall as Tiffany Freeman, Baby Billy's much younger and childish wife, later the mother of their children, Lionel and Aimee-Leigh Jr.
- Jody Hill as Levi, a member of Jesse's "gang" and guitarist at the Gemstone Salvation Center
- James DuMont as Chad, a member of Jesse's "gang" whose marriage falls apart after the revelation of his scandalous behavior.
- Troy Anthony Hogan as Matthew, a member of Jesse's "gang"
- J. LaRose as Gregory, a member of Jesse's "gang"
- Kelton DuMont as Pontius Gemstone, Jesse's ill-mannered second son
- Gavin Munn as Abraham Gemstone, Jesse's youngest son
- Scott MacArthur as Scotty Steele (season 1), Gideon's friend from Los Angeles. He appears later as a ghost.
- Mary Hollis Inboden as Mandy, wife, and later, ex-wife of Chad (season 1–3)
- Cullen Moss as Brock, a security guard at the Gemstones' family compound
- Jade Pettyjohn as Dot Nancy (season 1), Dale and Gay Nancy's rebellious teenage daughter
- Jason Schwartzman as Thaniel Block (season 2), an investigative reporter writing about the Gemstone family
- Eric Roberts as Glendon "Junior" Marsh Jr. (season 2), a professional wrestling promoter who shares a criminal past with Eli.
- Eric André as Lyle Lissons (season 2), a prominent Texas televangelist who wants to work with Jesse
- Jessica Lowe as Lindy Lissons (season 2), Lyle's wife and business partner
- Crystal Coney as Angie
- Steve Zahn as Peter Montgomery (season 3), a militia leader, and Eli's estranged brother-in-law.
- Kristen Johnston as Mary "May–May" Montgomery (season 3), Eli's younger sister, Peter's ex-wife, and mother of Chuck and Karl
- Stephen Dorff as Vance Simkins (season 3–4), Jesse's rival who leads a competing church alongside his siblings.
- Shea Whigham as Dusty Daniels (season 3), an aging NASCAR driver and prominent donor to the Gemstones' church.
- Lukas Haas as Chuck Montgomery (season 3), Peter and May–May's son, Eli's nephew, and cousin to the Gemstone siblings.
- Robert Oberst as Karl Montgomery (season 3), Peter and May–May's son, Eli's nephew, and cousin to the Gemstone siblings.
- Stephen Schneider as Stephen (season 3), a musician with whom Judy has a brief affair while on tour.
- Iliza Shlesinger as Shay Marigold (season 3), Vance Simkins' sister.
- Gogo Lomo-David as Craig Simkins (season 3–4), Vance Simkins' brother.
- Sturgill Simpson as Marshall (season 3), a member of Peter's militia.
- Casey Wilson as Kristy (season 3), Stephen's wife.
- Maggie Winters as Taryn (season 3), Kelvin's assistant after Keefe breaks up with him and quits his job.
- Megan Mullally as Lori Milsap (season 4), Aimee-Leigh's long-time musical partner and family friend of the Gemstones.
- Michael Rooker as Cobb Milsap (season 4), Lori's ex-husband and a former family-friend of the Gemstones.
- Seann William Scott as Corey Milsap (season 4), Lori's son and family friend of the Gemstone siblings.
- Arden Myrin as Jana Milsap (season 4), Corey's wife.
- Jennifer R. Blake as Deena Milsap (season 4)
- Kerstin Schulze as Sola (season 4), the Freemans' nanny.

=== Guest ===
- Virginia Gardner as Lucy (season 1), Scotty's girlfriend and Gideon's friend
- Toby Huss as Dale Nancy (season 1), a loose parody of Dan Cathy, and a congregant and donor to the Gemstones' church
- Marla Maples as Gay Nancy (season 1), Dale Nancy's wife
- Joe Jonas as himself (season 2), a co-investor in Zion's Landing
- Wayne Duvall as Glendon Marsh Sr. (season 2), a professional wrestling promoter and organized crime figure
- Macaulay Culkin as Harmon Freeman (season 2), Baby Billy Freeman's estranged son from a previous marriage, whom he abandoned in 1993. Jeremy T. Thomas portrays a younger Harmon in flashbacks.
- John Amos as Buddy Lissons (season 2), Lyle's father. This would be Amos' final television appearance prior to his death in 2024.
- Bradley Cooper as Elijah Gemstone (season 4), Eli's ancestor
- Josh McDermitt as Abel Grieves (season 4), a minister Elijah murdered and took his name
- James Landry Hébert as Major McFall (season 4)
- Steve Little as Jacob Jones, host of "Top Christ Following Man Of The Year" (season 4)
- Regan Burns as Big Dick Mitch (season 4), a car dealer who Lori dated briefly

== Episodes ==
Season	Episodes	Originally released	
Season	Episodes	First released	Last released
1	9	August 18, 2019	October 13, 2019
2	9	January 9, 2022	February 27, 2022
3	9	June 18, 2023	July 30, 2023
4	9	March 9, 2025	May 4, 2025

=== Season 1 (2019) ===
No. overall	No. in season	Title	Directed by	Written by	Original release date	U.S. viewers (millions)
1	1	"The Righteous Gemstones"	Danny McBride	Danny McBride	August 18, 2019	0.593
The Gemstones are a family of televangelists and megachurch pastors led by widowed patriarch Eli and his children, Jesse, Judy and Kelvin. Two masked individuals blackmail Jesse for a million dollars, threatening to release a video of him and his buddies engaged in lewd behavior at a private party. Reverend John Wesley Seasons confronts the Gemstones over their plans to expand into Locust Grove, which could put Seasons' smaller church out of business, but Eli coldly rejects any compromise. Suspecting Seasons is the blackmailer, Jesse and his gang attack Seasons at his home, but the plan goes awry when Seasons wounds one of Jesse's men with a shotgun, forcing them to flee. Jesse confesses his dilemma to Judy and Kelvin, and they agree to help, with Judy providing embezzled cash she hid in the church. At the planned exchange with the blackmailers in a deserted parking lot, Jesse argues with one of the masked men, which escalates into a fight. The Gemstone siblings flee in their vehicle, but accidentally strike the man. When the blackmailers' driver checks on the injured man, Jesse intentionally runs over the driver before escaping.
2	2	"Is This the Man Who Made the Earth Tremble"	David Gordon Green	Danny McBride	August 25, 2019	0.594
A third person is revealed to be in the blackmailers' van. The man, who was the originator of the criminal scheme, takes his wounded accomplices Scotty and Lucy to the hospital, before moving to a motel. Lucy eventually abandons them, and an angry Scotty fights with the third blackmailer, blaming him for the plan's failure. Realizing that a security camera filmed their encounter on the previous night, the Gemstone siblings plot to retrieve the footage, with Jesse sending his henchmen to strongarm a store owner. Keefe, Kelvin's confederate, identifies the motel. However, by the time Jesse and his friends get to the motel, the blackmailers have already checked out. The unnamed third blackmailer shows up at Jesse's mansion, where he is revealed to be Gideon, Jesse's estranged son.
3	3	"They Are Weak, But He Is Strong"	David Gordon Green	Danny McBride & John Carcieri	September 1, 2019 (Note: Episode 3 was first made available on August 30, 2019, through HBO's digital platform.)	0.530
Eli's estranged brother-in-law Baby Billy Freeman returns to the Gemstones' ministry to lead their new shopping-mall-based satellite church. Their plans are threatened when Reverend Seasons distributes pamphlets exposing the Gemstones' past scandals. Eli and Billy confront him at his church, which culminates in Eli shattering a church steeple window. After a heated argument, Billy quits his position and intends to return home. Gideon starts to reconcile with his family, but Jesse resents him for abandoning them to become a stuntman in Los Angeles. During a family dinner, tensions arise when Eli reveals that he knows his children view him in a negative light following his wife's death, Jesse's son Pontius makes rude remarks at his father, and Jesse expresses his anger at Gideon. After talking with his children, Eli decides to make amends with Billy. Billy and his much younger wife Tiffany are in the mall church when a gang sent by Seasons breaks in and vandalizes the sanctuary. Eli arrives and holds the gang at gunpoint, forcing them to flee naked through the mall to send a message to Seasons. Billy decides to stay with the family.
4	4	"Wicked Lips"	Jody Hill	John Carcieri & Jeff Fradley & Danny McBride	September 8, 2019	0.562
The wife of Jesse's friend Chad discovers compromising e-mails between her husband and Jesse. Kelvin and Keefe counsel the troubled teen daughter of a major donor. Gideon plans to steal from the church's vault. Driving back from smoothing things over with Chad's wife, Jesse spots the blackmailers' distinctive van. To his wife's horror, he causes them to roll the van. Jesse pursues them with a pistol, but the blackmailers escape without being recognized.
5	5	"Interlude"	David Gordon Green	John Carcieri & Jeff Fradley & Danny McBride	September 15, 2019	0.560
In a flashback to 1989, Eli's wife, Aimee-Leigh, announces she is pregnant for the third time. Her brother, "Baby" Billy Freeman had been planning a reunion tour for their childhood song and dance act, which Aimee-Leigh cancels due to her pregnancy. At Judy's birthday, an angry Billy gets young Jesse drunk and convinces him to fight with his father. When Aimee-Leigh confronts Billy about his behavior, Billy threatens to sell off pieces of the family farm, due to his financial hardships. Aimee-Leigh reluctantly agrees to do the tour, but quits in anger when she realizes Billy has already sold off parts of the land. Billy blames Eli and promises revenge.
6	6	"Now the Sons of Eli Were Worthless Men"	Jody Hill	Grant Dekernion & Danny McBride & Edi Patterson	September 22, 2019	0.469
Jesse and his siblings search the blackmailers' van, but are unable to come up with any clues. When Scotty calls to threaten Jesse, Jesse deduces the blackmailers have no power and declares their problems over. Judy, disgusted by how her father never lets her do any meaningful work, agrees to sing at Billy's church. She performs well, despite her father's warning that Billy is using her to get back at him. Scotty, posing as an old friend of Gideon's, cons his way onto the estate.
7	7	"And Yet One of You Is a Devil"	Jody Hill	Kevin Barnett & Chris Pappas & Danny McBride	September 29, 2019	0.511
Eli asks Jesse to give the Easter sermon and for Judy and Billy to perform. Billy convinces Judy to sing at his mall church service instead, driving a wedge between her and her father. An egotistical Judy fights with her fiancé BJ, who breaks off their engagement. During the Easter service, Gideon confronts Scotty and backs out of their plan to steal the donation money. That night, Scotty takes Gideon, Jesse, and Eli hostage at gunpoint. He robs the church vault, leaving Jesse and Gideon tied up inside.
8	8	"But the Righteous Will See Their Fall"	David Gordon Green	Kevin Barnett & Chris Pappas & Danny McBride	October 6, 2019	0.610
Billy and his wife Tiffany's car is struck by an escaping Scotty, who is knocked unconscious. They discover the stolen money and gun. When Scotty suddenly sits up, Tiffany panics and fatally shoots him. She and Billy flee town with the money. Gideon takes the blame for the robbery and is kicked out by his mother, Amber. Kelvin angrily kicks Keefe out of the compound. Judy attempts to reconcile with BJ, who refuses, causing her to angrily vandalize his coworker's car. She is arrested and bailed out by Eli. Jesse, guilt-ridden over Gideon, shows the sex tape to his wife and his friends' wives. Amber becomes enraged and shoots Jesse in the buttocks.
9	9	"Better Is the End of a Thing Than Its Beginning"	Jody Hill	John Carcieri & Jeff Fradley & Danny McBride	October 13, 2019	0.606
The Gemstone children confess everything to Eli, who fires them from the ministry. Amber insists that Jesse go to Haiti to retrieve Gideon who is there doing missionary work. Jesse tries to convince Gideon to return home, but he refuses. Judy and BJ reconcile. Kelvin rescues Keefe from his Satanic former friends. The siblings deduce that it was Billy who stole the money from Scotty's van after Kelvin finds the Jesus statue from Baby Billy's car at the site of Scotty's death. Along with Eli, they go to Billy's home to retrieve it. During the confrontation, Billy is struck by lightning, but survives. He claims to have spoken with Aimee-Leigh in Heaven, who asked him to forgive Eli. He returns the money. Eli hires Rev. Seasons to take over Billy's post at the mall church, while Billy becomes a tent evangelist, making money describing his near-death experience. Jesse, who was kicked out of his house by Amber, goes to Haiti and joins his son on his mission trip.

=== Season 2 (2022) ===
No. overall	No. in season	Title	Directed by	Written by	Original release date	U.S. viewers (millions)
10	1	"I Speak in the Tongues of Men and Angels"	David Gordon Green	Danny McBride	January 9, 2022	0.291
In 1968, a young Eli Gemstone works as a professional wrestler. Eli's employer, Glendon Marsh, and his son, Junior, agree to pay Eli extra to assault a man who owes Glen money. In the present day, Jesse and Gideon have returned to the US, with Jesse and Amber having reconciled and Gideon working as a videographer for the church. Judy and BJ have married, and Kelvin has started a Christian bodybuilders group. In the midst of multiple sex scandals rocking the megachurch world, Jesse and Amber are contacted by Lyle and Lindy Lissons, a Texan televangelist couple, to partner on a Christian resort called Zion's Landing. After touring the land, Eli refuses to lend his support, as it is too big a gamble during a volatile time for the church. After an argument with Jesse, Eli reluctantly allows for Jesse to go forward with the project. Eli is approached by Junior, and they reconnect before getting into a fight with a man in a restaurant parking lot.
11	2	"After I Leave, Savage Wolves Will Come"	Jody Hill	Danny McBride & John Carcieri & Jeff Fradley	January 9, 2022	0.190
Thaniel Block, an investigative reporter researching hypocrisy in religious circles, arrives and informs Eli that he is writing a story about Aimee-Leigh, due to past allegations of abusive behavior from the Gemstones' staff. Eli refuses to cooperate. Jesse and Amber attend a fundraising event for Zion's Landing, only to find that the initial investment buy-in is greater than they can afford. After Eli informs the family about Block's story, Jesse, Judy and Kelvin decide to confront Block at his rental cabin. When they arrive, they find multiple dead bodies, including Block. Fleeing the scene, they are met by Eli and Martin. Noticing Eli has blood on his clothes, the kids suspect he may be involved in Block's murder.
12	3	"For He Is a Liar and the Father of Lies"	David Gordon Green	Danny McBride & Kevin Barnett & Chris Pappas	January 16, 2022	0.327
The Gemstones and Martin return to Thaniel's cabin, only to find it ablaze. Eli asks that the children keep their involvement with the situation to themselves, but, nevertheless, the Gemstones face public scrutiny for their proximity to Thaniel's death. The Gemstone children find circumstantial evidence regarding Eli and the night of Thaniel's death, as well as connections between Eli and Junior. They confront Eli, who asserts his innocence, claiming that the blood on his clothes was due to a grooming accident. Upset that their father might be starting to date other women, the children leave. Meanwhile, an accident involving Kelvin's "God Squad" leads to one of its members, Titus, challenging Kelvin's authority. When Eli attempts to break off his friendship with Junior, suspecting Junior may be involved in Block's murder, Junior claims he is now Eli's enemy.
13	4	"As to How They Might Destroy Him"	Danny McBride	Danny McBride & John Carcieri & Edi Patterson	January 23, 2022	0.289
In 1993, Baby Billy abandons his wife, Gloria, and son, Harmon, in a mall. In the present, the Gemstones throw an extravagant baptism service and afterparty for BJ, who has only agreed to undergo the sacrament to please Judy. Resentful that Eli has refused to enable the God Squad's trip to the Holy Land, Kelvin's anger simmers for much of the proceedings. Tensions arise between Judy, BJ, and BJ's agnostic family during the afterparty, causing BJ to lash out at his sister, KJ, which embarrasses Eli in front of his wealthy and important guests. Meanwhile, Baby Billy, whose music career is making a small comeback following his "miraculous experience", grows weary of a now-pregnant Tiffany, and leaves the afterparty without her. As Eli is leaving the party, he is confronted by Kelvin. Their argument soon becomes a physical altercation, leading to Eli breaking Kelvin's thumbs. Jesse and Amber commandeer Eli's party-bus in the ensuing chaos, only to be later assaulted by masked gunmen while at a gas station.
14	5	"Interlude II"	David Gordon Green	Danny McBride & John Carcieri & Jeff Fradley	January 30, 2022	0.309
In December 1993, Eli wishes to expand operations despite public scrutiny over his ministry's finances. Glendon Marsh Sr. reconnects with Eli, promising to give him $1 million in exchange for letting Marsh launder his money through the church. Despite protestations from Aimee-Leigh and Eli's senile father, Roy, Eli considers Marsh's offer, but ultimately declines. Meanwhile, Baby Billy spends the holidays with the Gemstones, having convinced them that Gloria is at fault for their failed marriage. However, on Christmas Day, Aimee-Leigh confronts Baby Billy, leading him to admit that he left his family because he feels inadequate as a husband and provider. Hoping to cheer Baby Billy up, Eli offers him a performance spot on their televised Christmas special, which Baby Billy accepts. During the special, Eli announces that the ministry will nevertheless be expanding into a bigger building, despite still not having a stable source of income. That night, Marsh arrives on the compound, threatening to harm Eli's family if he doesn't agree to Marsh's proposal. Suddenly, Roy appears and kills Marsh with a shotgun. Eli and Martin dispose of the body and take Roy back to his mansion. In the present, Junior, implied to suspect Eli's involvement in his father's disappearance, plots his next move.
15	6	"Never Avenge Yourselves, but Leave It to the Wrath of God"	Jody Hill	Danny McBride & John Carcieri & Jeff Fradley	February 6, 2022	0.288
Jesse and Amber survive the attack at the gas station, with Amber returning fire and hitting one of the gunmen, whom Jesse dubs as "The Cycle Ninjas". Nevertheless, all the assassins flee. Amber is hailed as a hero by the congregation, which upsets Jesse. Kelvin has grown despondent following his embarrassing altercation with Eli. Keefe encourages him to re-establish dominance over the God Squad, but Kelvin fails to do so when one member, Torsten, challenges Kelvin for leadership of the group. Keefe, acting in Kelvin's stead, and Torsten compete in a contest of strength, which Keefe quickly loses. Torsten assumes the role of leader, and Kelvin is forced to do menial labor for the Squad. After a heartfelt conversation with BJ, Eli attempts to mend his relationship with Kelvin, but Kelvin refuses to engage, believing that Eli will never take him seriously. Meanwhile, Jesse forms a new men's group, hoping to use them as backup in an eventual confrontation with Junior. Jesse and the group do manage to find and threaten Junior, but he seems mostly unfazed by their warnings. Later, Eli is harassed and shot by the Cycle Ninjas, causing him to crash his car.
16	7	"And Infants Shall Rule Over Them"	Jody Hill	Danny McBride & John Carcieri & Jeff Fradley	February 13, 2022	0.280
Eli is comatose and in critical condition following the Cycle Ninjas' attack. BJ, Judy and Tiffany track Baby Billy's recent credit card history, eventually finding him selling fraudulent supplements. Baby Billy claims to be raising money for his unborn son, and accuses Tiffany for not trusting him before abandoning her again. Meanwhile, Jesse confides with Martin that he fears Eli's eventual death or resignation, as he doesn't truly believe he is capable of leading the church. As Martin consoles him, the two begin to construct a plan of attack against the Cycle Ninjas. Eli is moved back to the compound, while the Gemstone children publicly disinform the congregation that he is still recovering in the hospital, hoping to lure the Cycle Ninjas into a trap. However, Jesse angrily dismisses his private security detail after a misunderstanding, leaving only himself, Martin, BJ and Gideon left to ensnare the Cycle Ninjas. The assassins arrive, and Jesse is able to incapacitate two, as Gideon pursues the others. As Gideon successfully runs the remaining assassins off the road, Eli wakes up from his coma.
17	8	"The Prayer of a Righteous Man"	David Gordon Green	Danny McBride & Grant Dekernion & Chad Handley	February 20, 2022	0.304
In 1993, Glendon Marsh Sr. retires, allowing Junior to take over the business. However, as soon as Junior has proved himself capable of filling his father's shoes, Marsh Sr. robs him and skips town. In the present, Baby Billy decides to visit a now-grown Harmon, hoping to make amends for his absence as a father. Harmon is resistant to Baby Billy's efforts, but does accept punching Baby Billy in the face as a means of reconciliation. Meanwhile, a recovered Eli praises and thanks his family for their actions during his convalescence, which in turn prompts Kelvin to regain control of the God Squad (which he then disbands) and Judy to accept Tiffany as a member of the family. Eli also gives his blessing and financial support to Jesse to pursue Zion's Landing. Later, Eli confesses the truth about Marsh Sr. to his children, and tells them his plans to confront Junior in order to end the conflict. Despite the children's protests, Eli carries out his plan. After learning the truth, Junior forgives Eli, but tells him that he wasn't behind the Cycle Ninjas. Later that night, the Cycle Ninjas escape from jail.
18	9	"I Will Tell of All Your Deeds"	Jody Hill	Danny McBride & John Carcieri & Jeff Fradley	February 27, 2022	0.402
In a flashback, Lyle Lissons feeds compromising information on other televangelists to Thaniel Block, in order to thin out competition. However, he refuses to divulge any information on the Gemstones, fearing it would put Zion's Landing at risk. Frustrated, Thaniel threatens to expose Lyle next. Lyle and some associates attempt to intimidate Thaniel with grenades, leading Block to open fire on them. Gunfire and explosions ensue. Thaniel is killed by a ricocheting bullet, and two of Lissons' men are killed in a grenade blast. Lissons hides as the Gemstones arrive on the scene, and later burns Thaniel's cabin and his remaining associates to hide the evidence of his involvement. In the present, the Gemstones attend the groundbreaking ceremony for Zion's Landing. Baby Billy arrives at the reception, hoping to repair his relationship with Tiffany. However, Tiffany gives birth to their son in a port-a-potty before she can give him an answer. During the reception, Eli receives a call from Junior, who has traced the Cycle Ninjas' weapons back to Lissons. Lyle privately confesses everything to Jesse, including that the Cycle Ninjas are teenagers from Lisson's orphanage. Lyle and Jesse fight on the beach before Lindy arrives, threatening the entire family at gunpoint. The Lissons successfully escape. One month later, the Gemstones have taken control of the Zion's Landing project. Tiffany and Baby Billy have reconciled, and Kelvin and Keefe have begun a youth fitness program. Martin hires the Cycle Ninjas, who are angered that they were never paid by Lyle, to track the Lissons to Alaska, where they kill Lindy and force Lyle into the tundra, where he freezes to death and is eaten by wolves.

=== Season 3 (2023) ===
No. overall	No. in season	Title	Directed by	Written by	Original release date	U.S. viewers (millions)
19	1	"For I Know the Plans I Have for You"	Jody Hill	John Carcieri & Danny McBride	June 18, 2023	0.238
In a flashback to 2000, Aimee-Leigh is harassed by a woman named May–May while at a monster truck rally sponsored by the Gemstones. In the present day, the Gemstone siblings argue over the direction of the church as Eli scales back his involvement, resulting in falling poll numbers. Dusty Daniels, a professional race car driver, writes the Gemstones out of his will and joins a competing church run by the Simkins siblings. Judy is revealed to have had an affair with her guitarist, Stephen, while on tour. Kelvin and Keefe form the "Smut Busters" team to shut down local sex shops by buying out their inventory. Eli meets with May–May, who is revealed to be his younger sister, who begs him to help with her sons, Chuck and Karl. Jesse's crew corners Vance Simkins in a parking lot and brutally assaults him.
20	2	"But Esau Ran to Meet Him"	Jody Hill	John Carcieri & Danny McBride	June 18, 2023	0.223
The Gemstones visit Peter Montgomery, May–May's husband, who now runs a doomsday prepper compound with his sons. Peter throws them out. The FBI later raids the compound. Peter blames his sons Chuck and Karl for conspiring with their mother and the Gemstones. The church ministers call a meeting with the Gemstone children, citing concern about their leadership. When Eli fails to appear, the meeting devolves into a fight, with the Gemstones and ministers throwing their shoes at each other. Eli, with the help of his new driver Gideon, spirits Chuck and Karl to safety.
21	3	"For Their Nakedness Is Your Own Nakedness"	Danny McBride	Kevin Barnett & Danny McBride & Chris Pappas	June 25, 2023	0.219
Baby Billy, now a resident performer at Zion's Landing, confides to his pregnant wife Tiffany that he feels that his fame is stagnating, and that he dreams of becoming a television personality. He pitches a Bible-themed version of Family Feud to the Gemstone children, who are unimpressed. May–May leaves Chuck and Karl at the Gemstone compound, much to the younger Gemstones' disgust. Eli insists they have a 'cousins night.' The party goes badly, with Billy insisting they play a round of his game show, almost ending in a knife fight between Jesse and Chuck. When Karl begins to choke, the Gemstones save him, and the cousins begin to mend fences. Amber confronts Judy about her affair, while BJ remains oblivious. Eli visits his sister May–May, who is living in an abandoned church, and helps her clean up her home.
22	4	"I Have Not Come to Bring Peace, But a Sword"	Jody Hill	John Carcieri & Danny McBride	July 2, 2023	0.256
Concerned parents force the Gemstones to remove Keefe from the youth ministry due to his Smut Busters activities and perceived relationship with Kelvin. Keefe moves out of Kelvin's mansion. Jesse is inducted into Eli's secret ministerial organization, the Cape and Pistol Society, but is immediately publicly chastised for using profanity when arguing with Vance Simkins. Baby Billy says Jesse will never achieve Eli's level of greatness without a woman like his mother and demonstrates how he could 'resurrect' Aimee-Leigh via holographic projection. Judy's lover Stephen harasses her and BJ, forcing her to confess their affair to her husband. Peter, the Montgomery patriarch, confronts the Gemstones during their Sunday lunch and asks his sons to return to the new compound. Karl and Chuck say they've found a new home with the Gemstones and their mother. Later, however, they drive a truckload of ammonium nitrate from the Gemstones' ground crew to their father, who plans to use it to make explosives.
23	5	"Interlude III"	David Gordon Green	John Carcieri & Danny McBride	July 9, 2023	0.240
In 2000, the Gemstones face criticism for spreading fear of a Y2K doomsday while selling buckets of survival supplies. In high school, Judy is traumatized after her crush Trent cuts off her hair. Jesse introduces new girlfriend Amber to the family, but she clashes with Judy, who steals her ring. The Montgomerys lead a snake handling church and have an uneasy relationship with the Gemstones. When Peter loses his family's savings by over-investing in Gemstone buckets, May–May refuses Eli's offer to buy them back. In a private conversation, Eli and Aimee-Leigh admit that they never believed in the Y2K apocalypse and wryly joke about Judy's mental health problems, which Judy overhears unbeknownst to them. Jesse has a sincere conversation with Judy, and she returns Amber's ring, while Jesse dons a mask to attack Trent and shave his head in revenge. Eli appeases a group of congregants angry over the Y2K scam, but only after Aimee-Leigh supports him. Desperate for money, Peter attempts to rob a bank, kills a guard in a shootout, and is left lying wounded in the street.
24	6	"For Out of the Heart Comes Evil Thoughts"	Jonathan Watson	John Carcieri & Danny McBride	July 16, 2023	0.301
Chuck and Karl leave the Gemstones' estate, and Jesse gives them the Redeemer monster truck as a gift, though he immediately regrets it. Chuck and Karl return to Peter's compound, pretending they stole the Redeemer. Judy and BJ's marriage is troubled by the revelation of her affair, and Judy seeks advice from Amber's women's group. Eli denies Judy's request for financial help, fed up with his children's irresponsibility. Martin arranges a large hush money payment to Stephen and his wife Kristy. Now working at a carpentry shop, Keefe tries to reconcile with Kelvin, but becomes jealous over Taryn who has replaced him as assistant youth pastor. Jesse and Baby Billy present their Aimee-Leigh hologram to the family, but Kelvin, Judy, and Eli smash the projector in disgust. Jesse and his gang coach BJ to fight with brass knuckles. BJ intercepts a message from Stephen inviting Judy to a tryst at his house and goes there to confront him. BJ walks in on Stephen masturbating and they fight, with a naked Stephen savagely beating BJ and dragging him onto the front lawn. BJ wins the fight after grabbing Stephen's testicles. Disturbed by his actions, BJ returns home and tells Judy, "I hope you like me now."
25	7	"Burn for Burn, Wound for Wound, Stripe for Stripe"	Danny McBride	John Carcieri & Jeff Fradley & Danny McBride	July 23, 2023	0.243
Judy, Kelvin, and Jesse are separately kidnapped by members of the Montgomery militia and held hostage in a silo. Peter makes a ransom demand for $15 million for their return. The siblings are forced to perform a church service for the militia, where Peter berates them for being inept preachers. Eli, partially on May–May's advice, refuses to pay the ransom, and Peter's men plan to kill one of the hostages. After much bickering, the siblings reflect on their lives, wishing they had treated their loved ones better and admitting that they love each other. May–May, who had been summoned by Karl, arrives and breaks out the Gemstones. Peter and Chuck stop them at gunpoint and Peter orders Chuck to shoot May–May. They are saved by Gideon, who had secretly followed May–May. Driving the Redeemer monster truck, he trashes the compound and allows Jesse, Judy, Kelvin, May–May, and Karl to escape.
26	8	"I Will Take You by the Hand and Keep You"	Jody Hill	Scott MacArthur & Danny McBride & Edi Patterson	July 30, 2023	0.227
Jesse, Judy, and Kelvin are reunited with their families at the hospital and decide to put aside past grievances, though all three are indignant over Eli's refusal to pay the ransom. Peter's militia turns against him over the loss of their compound and the failure of his scheme. He and Chuck attempt to win them back but ultimately set out on their own with the explosives, leaving the police to arrest the remaining militia members. The siblings resolve to lead the church as equal partners and remain bitter toward Eli, who tells his kids he would have paid the ransom if he believed their lives were in danger and that he loves them. Eli expresses pride that the three are finally working together as a team, even though they're united in anger against him. Before the Gemstones take the stage for their joint service, Kelvin openly kisses Keefe in view of the family. Jesse, Judy, and Kelvin greet a full audience at the service, their popularity bolstered by the news of their kidnapping and rescue. Peter and Chuck drive their truck full of explosives toward the Salvation Center.
27	9	"Wonders That Cannot Be Fathomed, Miracles That Cannot Be Counted"	Jody Hill	John Carcieri & Jeff Fradley & Danny McBride	July 30, 2023	0.214
To win back Dusty to their cause, Baby Billy suggests that the Gemstones face off against the Simkins on his game show. While Peter stops to use a Coinstar machine, the truck explodes, seemingly killing Chuck. Later, at a gas station, Peter steals Keefe's "Smut Busters" truck. It is revealed that Chuck survived the explosion, setting it off when he knew no one was around. Before the show starts, Baby Billy gives the Gemstones the cards with the answers, but the Gemstones decide not to use them. May–May, Eli and Gideon confront Peter, who has turned the truck into another bomb. During the show, the Gemstones are losing badly to the Simkins. A swarm of locusts suddenly emerges and descends on the church. During the chaos, Jesse rescues Dusty, who was abandoned by Vance Simkins as he ran to safety. When the swarm subsides, Peter apologizes to the Gemstones but a final locust causes him to accidentally activate the bomb. Peter drives the truck away to save the family. Later, Dusty dies, leaving the Gemstones his estate. The whole family gathers—including Peter, who survived the explosion but lost a leg—and take turns crushing old furniture in the Redeemer. Aimee-Leigh's spirit watches her family proudly from a distance.

=== Season 4 (2025) ===
No. overall	No. in season	Title	Directed by	Written by	Original release date	U.S. viewers (millions)
28	1	"Prelude"	Danny McBride	John Carcieri & Jeff Fradley & Danny McBride	March 9, 2025	0.291
In Virginia, 1862, Elijah Gemstone kills and robs local minister Abel Grieves, assuming his identity and becoming a chaplain for the local Confederate regiment. Elijah spends his time in the camp gambling, drinking, and giving lackluster spiritual counsel to his fellow soldiers. One soldier, Ned Rollins, blackmails Elijah into helping him hustle a commanding officer in a card game. After successfully scamming the officer, Elijah murders Rollins and hides his body. The following day, Elijah and the regiment are ambushed by Union soldiers. The Union soldiers spare Elijah, due to his status as a chaplain, but prepare to execute the other Confederates by firing squad. Elijah offers an emotional and comforting prayer for his comrades, and later returns to the camp with their corpses. Believing God has spared him, Elijah begins to study the gold-plated Bible he stole from Grieves.
29	2	"You Hurled Me Into the Very Heart of the Seas"	Jody Hill	John Carcieri & Jeff Fradley & Danny McBride	March 16, 2025	0.264
With an annual telethon just days away, the Gemstone children visit a fully-retired Eli in the Florida Keys. The children guilt Eli into appearing on the Aimee-Leigh birthday telethon to boost donations. Leading up to the telethon, each member of the Gemstone family tends to their personal and professional affairs. Jesse and Amber work to launch a chain of kiosks, known as “Prayer Pods” to allow for widespread access to Gemstones content. Kelvin and Keefe lead a progressive, LGBTQ+ friendly program at the church, though Kelvin is reluctant to further publicize his relationship with Keefe. While preparing for the telethon, Baby Billy asks Lori Milsap, an old friend and fellow performer of Aimee-Leigh’s, to participate. Eli develops an attraction to Lori, and kisses her backstage during the telethon.
30	3	"To Grieve Like the Rest of Men Who Have No Hope"	David Gordon Green	John Carcieri & Jeff Fradley & Danny McBride	March 23, 2025	0.325
In 2002, a masked intruder breaks into the Gemstone mansion, steals Elijah's golden Bible, and terrorizes a young Kelvin. In the present, Lori brings her son Corey and his wife Jana to a Gemstone cookout. Corey and the Gemstone siblings begin to suspect Eli and Lori's relationship. Kelvin announces he is in the running for the "Top Christ Following Man of the Year" award. BJ has taken up competitive pole dancing, but has an accidental fall during a performance, which puts him in a wheelchair. Rival minister Vance Simkins antagonizes Jesse and continues opening church branches in Gemstone territory. Confronted at family lunch, Eli admits that he and Lori are in a relationship, which disgusts his children. Eli tries to convince them that he must move on from Aimee-Leigh. Late at night, Jesse's gang sets one of Simkins' new ministry centers on fire.
31	4	"He Goeth Before You Into Galilee"	Danny McBride	John Carcieri & Jeff Fradley & Danny McBride	March 30, 2025	0.375
Baby Billy goes nude waterskiing at Galilee Gulch, the Gemstones' lake house, where the extended family is vacationing for the weekend. The Gemstone siblings believe that the location will bring back memories of Aimee-Leigh, which they hope will break up Eli and Lori's relationship. They conspire to disrupt the couple with several gambits: telling Eli about Lori's previous boyfriend Big Dick Mitch, singing about their mother's vengeful spirit, and Judy attempting to seduce Lori. When Keefe dresses up as Aimee-Leigh's ghost, he is beaten down by Sola, the muscular nanny to Baby Billy and Tiffany's children. After these debacles, the siblings decide to apologize to Eli, but walk in on him and Lori in the 69 sex position. Afterwards Eli tries to talk to his children, but they are disgusted upon noticing a spot of pre-ejaculate on his trousers.
32	5	"You Shall Remember"	Jody Hill	John Carcieri & Jeff Fradley & Danny McBride	April 6, 2025	0.276
Lori tries to reconcile with the Gemstone siblings, but their relationship gets even more antagonistic. BJ is consumed by anger over his injury, lashing out at Judy. His attitude improves after Amber introduces the couple to Dr. Watson, an exceptionally intelligent capuchin monkey service animal. Baby Billy convinces the Gemstones to finance Teenjus, a TV series he wrote featuring a teenaged Jesus. Kelvin's ego swells due to his Top Christ Following Man of the Year nomination, but he's shaken when rival nominee Vance Simkins attacks him with fundamentalist anti-gay rhetoric at a debate. The siblings investigate Lori, discovering that her exes have disappeared or died under suspicious circumstances. They inform Eli of this, but he dismisses their claims. Later, Eli and Lori are at her house when an unseen assailant throws a brick through the window and torches Eli's car.
33	6	"Interlude IV"	David Gordon Green	John Carcieri & Jeff Fradley & Danny McBride	April 13, 2025	0.294
In 2002, the Gemstones face community backlash over a construction project. Aimee-Leigh reunites with Lori to record new music. Lori is going through a contentious separation from her husband Cobb Milsap, the owner of an alligator farm tourist attraction. Cobb becomes belligerent after Eli intervenes in a fight with Lori. The Milsaps' son Corey hangs out with the Gemstone kids, but when they decide to go out, they leave young Kelvin home alone. Believing the Gemstone mansion to be empty, Cobb dons a mask and burglarizes and vandalizes the home, stealing Elijah's golden Bible, a Gemstone family heirloom. His rampage only stops when he finds Kelvin hiding under a bed. In the aftermath, Corey realizes that his father was responsible, but lies to provide him an alibi. Meanwhile, Amber is pregnant, and Jesse wants to name the child "Stallone" until Eli suggests the name of a great Biblical leader: Gideon.
34	7	"For Jealousy Is the Rage of a Man"	Jonathan Watson	Kevin Barnett & Chris Pappas & Danny McBride	April 20, 2025	0.289
Judy becomes wary of the growing relationship between BJ and Dr. Watson. Baby Billy decides to take on the lead role in Teenjus himself, demanding an extra $2 million (and cocaine) for reshoots, which the siblings reject. Cobb runs an alligator feeding show, upon spotting Eli in the audience, warns to stay away from an alligator's territory. After the show, Eli confronts Cobb, who shows him a newspaper escort ad featuring Lori. Over dinner, Lori claims Cobb faked the ad, but is angered by Eli investigating her finances, and leaves. Jesse and Judy use the telethon jetpacks to reach Kelvin in his treehouse, where he has been in seclusion. Convinced to attend the final round of Top Christ Following Man of the Year, Kelvin publicly comes out as gay for the first time, and gives a moving speech about the diversity of all God's creations, winning the award.
35	8	"On Your Belly You Shall Go"	Jonathan Watson	Edi Patterson & John Carcieri & Danny McBride	April 27, 2025	0.280
Vance Simkins has a televised meltdown after Kelvin wins the award. BJ takes his first steps, but conflicts with Judy about keeping Dr. Watson. Cobb attends Corey's birthday party and argues with Corey and Lori over Eli. Judy convinces BJ to send Dr. Watson back to where he can help someone else in need. The siblings agree to help Lori contact Eli. Cobb subdues Eli and Baby Billy with tranquilizer darts and kidnaps them, holding them in a bunker with Big Dick Mitch, who he had previously abducted and had been using as a sex slave. Just as police officers arrive to investigate Big Dick Mitch's disappearance, the three prisoners escape the bunker, causing Cobb to shoot the officers and his employee. Eli and Baby Billy are rescued from Cobb when Corey arrives and stabs him with the knife Cobb had given him as a birthday gift. Corey throws Cobb into the gator pond and Eli rings the feeding bell, and Cobb is eaten alive. As the police and family members arrive, Eli and Lori reconcile.
36	9	"That Man of God May Be Complete"	Danny McBride	John Carcieri & Jeff Fradley & Danny McBride	May 4, 2025	0.274
At the Cape and Pistol Society, Vance challenges Jesse to a duel. Vance's first shot misses, and Jesse decides to spare his life, although Jesse and Eli quit the society in disgust. Kelvin proposes marriage to Keefe, who gladly accepts. BJ misses Dr. Watson and Judy arranges for him to see him again, and Judy decides to adopt him permanently. The family invites a mourning Corey to a weekend at the lake house, where he demands $7 million to buy the alligator park from the bank. As everyone else is out boating, Corey reveals to the siblings that he helped Cobb chase off and even kill Lori's suitors. He then chases the siblings through the house, shooting them one by one. As he leaves the house for more ammo, the siblings manage to drag themselves together. Judy calls Dr. Watson to retrieve Jesse's gun, which he then uses to shoot Corey in the head. A dying Corey asks the siblings to pray and forgive him. Later, Eli officiates Kelvin's and Keefe's wedding, and then returns to his yacht in Florida, where Lori appears, offering to be his first mate.

== Production ==
=== Development ===
Poster for the first season

On June 28, 2018, it was announced that HBO had given the production a pilot order. The episode was written and directed by Danny McBride who is also executive producer alongside Jody Hill and David Gordon Green. On October 2, 2018, it was reported that HBO had given the production a series order. On July 1, 2019, it was announced that the series would premiere on August 18, 2019. On September 9, 2019, the series was renewed for a second season. On January 25, 2022, HBO renewed the series for a third season. On July 27, 2023, HBO renewed the series for a fourth and final season.

=== Writing ===
McBride said he intended the series to run "longer than anything we've done before," including the four-season Eastbound & Down and the two-season Vice Principals. "If I had my way, when this is done, it's like this epic, sprawling tale, like the fucking Thorn Birds or something," he told Polygon. "You'll know everybody in this family, cousins, great uncles, all these people. In my eyes, this season is chapter one. It's just setting the table for who all these people are and what's about to happen." Like McBride's previous television characters, the Gemstones have "an inflated sense of self". McBride comments, "To me, the idea of a minister that sees themself as bigger than God just feels like the ultimate display of that."

For the second season, Eli's backstory was inspired by the Dixie Mafia and the Memphis professional wrestling business, two subjects that have long fascinated McBride. He has stated that the Gemstones were originally inspired by Mafia families and that Eli's gangster background informs how the character runs his church in the present. He draws a parallel between wrestling and televangelism in that both businesses are built around "showmanship" and maintaining "kayfabe".

=== Casting ===
Alongside the pilot order announcement, it was confirmed that Danny McBride and John Goodman would star in the pilot. In July 2018, it was announced that Edi Patterson, Adam DeVine, Cassidy Freeman, Tony Cavalero, and Tim Baltz had also joined the pilot's main cast. In May 2021, Jason Schwartzman, Eric Roberts, and Eric André joined the cast in recurring roles for the second season.

=== Filming ===
Principal photography for the pilot was completed in August 2018 in Charleston, South Carolina, at Citadel Mall. The North Charleston Coliseum served as the interior of Gemstone Ministries, while a former Sears store at Citadel Mall was re-purposed into the Locust Grove Worship Center. (The new church being a former Sears was kept and referenced in the series). In April 2021, HBO confirmed the second season had gone into production, having continued to film mainly in Charleston. In September 2022, it was reported that production on the third season was shut down due to the landfall of Hurricane Ian in South Carolina. Filming for the third season wrapped in December 2022.

Filming for the fourth season began in May 2024 and ended in early October 2024.

=== Music ===
The series music is composed by Joseph Stephens, who has collaborated with McBride on his previous television series. An original song, "Misbehavin", became a viral hit after its debut in the episode "Interlude". Performed by Jennifer Nettles and Walton Goggins as their characters Aimee-Leigh and Baby Billy, "Misbehavin'" is the fictional Freeman siblings' most popular song which they performed as children in the 1960s and reprised as adults in 1989. The song was written by McBride, co-star and co-writer Edi Patterson, and composer Stephens, who designed it to mimic a wholesome, old-time country song but with absurd lyrics such as "Runnin' through the house with a pickle in my mouth".

=== Release ===
On December 24, 2018, a "first look" still image from the series was released featuring Danny McBride, John Goodman, and Adam DeVine as Jesse Gemstone, Eli Gemstone, and Kelvin Gemstone, respectively. The series premiered on HBO on August 18, 2019. The second season premiered on January 9, 2022. The third season premiered on June 18, 2023. The fourth season premiered on March 9, 2025.

=== Home media ===
The first season was released on DVD, on April 14, 2020.

== Reception ==
=== Critical response ===
For the first season, the review aggregator website Rotten Tomatoes reported a 76% approval rating with an average rating of 7.1/10, based on 66 reviews. The website's critical consensus reads: "Though it may not win many new converts, fans of Danny McBride will find much to praise in The Righteous Gemstones's darkly hilarious pews." Metacritic, which uses a weighted average, assigned the season a score of 67 out of 100, based on 20 critics, indicating "generally favorable reviews".

For the second season, Rotten Tomatoes reported an 89% approval rating with an average rating of 7.5/10, based on 19 reviews. The website's critical consensus reads: "The Righteous Gemstones' second season can be as messy as its title characters, but it's hard to complain when the results are this uproariously funny." Metacritic assigned the season a score of 82 out of 100, based on 11 critics, indicating "universal acclaim".

For the third season, Rotten Tomatoes reported a 100% approval rating with an average rating of 8/10, based on 15 reviews. The website's critical consensus reads: "The Righteous Gemstones has its mixture of broad comedy and genuine pathos down pat, chapter and verse, and it preaches a riotously funny gospel in what might be its darkest installment yet." Metacritic assigned the season a score of 80 out of 100, based on 9 critics, indicating "generally favorable reviews".

For the fourth season, Rotten Tomatoes reported a 100% approval rating with an average rating of 8.9/10, based on 20 reviews. The website's critical consensus reads: "The Righteous Gemstones takes a bow with plenty of heavenly inspiration left in the tank, delivering a riotous final season that goes out on a holy high note." Metacritic assigned the season a score of 89 out of 100, based on 11 critics, indicating "universal acclaim".

=== Accolades ===
Year	Ceremony	Category	Nominee(s)	Result	Ref.
2020	Satellite Awards	Best Musical or Comedy Series	The Righteous Gemstones	Nominated	
2020	Satellite Awards	Best Actor in a Musical or Comedy Series	Danny McBride	Nominated	
2020	Satellite Awards	Best Supporting Actor in a Series, Miniseries or TV Film	Walton Goggins	Nominated	
2019	Hollywood Music in Media Awards	Best Original Song in a TV Show/Limited Series	"Misbehavin'" Music by Joseph Stephens; Lyrics by Joseph Stephens, Danny McBride, and Edi Patterson; Performed by Jennifer Nettles and Walton Goggins	Nominated	
2022	Hollywood Critics Association Awards	Best Cable Series, Comedy	The Righteous Gemstones	Nominated	
2022	Hollywood Critics Association Awards	Best Directing in a Broadcast Network or Cable Series, Comedy	Danny McBride (for "As to How They Might Destroy Him")	Nominated	
2022	Hollywood Critics Association Awards	Best Writing in a Broadcast Network or Cable Series, Comedy	John Carcieri, Danny McBride, and Edi Patterson (for "As to How They Might Destroy Him")	Nominated	
2022	Primetime Creative Arts Emmy Awards	Outstanding Stunt Coordination for a Comedy Series or Variety Program	John Copeman	Nominated	
2024	Primetime Creative Arts Emmy Awards	Outstanding Contemporary Costumes for a Series	Christina Flannery, Maura "Maude" Cusick, and Rebecca Denoewer (for "For I Know The Plans I Have for You")	Nominated	
2024	Primetime Creative Arts Emmy Awards	Outstanding Stunt Performance	Ryan Disharoon, Mike Endoso, Jett Jansen Fernandez, and Rich King (for "Burn for Burn, Wound for Wound, Stripe for Stripe")	Nominated	
2024	Primetime Creative Arts Emmy Awards	Outstanding Stunt Coordination for Comedy Programming	Cory DeMeyers	Nominated	
2025	Golden Trailer Awards	Best BTS/EPK for a TV/Streaming Series (Over 2 minutes)	HBO / Andrew Epstein (for "Baby Billy Faith Tonight Profile")	Nominated	
2025	Primetime Creative Arts Emmy Awards	Outstanding Cinematography for a Series (Half-Hour)	Paul Daley (for "Prelude")	Nominated	
2025	Primetime Creative Arts Emmy Awards	Outstanding Contemporary Costumes for a Series	Christina Flannery, Elizabeth Tagg, Maura "Maude" Cusick, and Aughra Moon (for "You Hurled Me Into The Depths, Into The Very Heart of The Seas")	Nominated	
2025	Primetime Creative Arts Emmy Awards	Outstanding Music Supervision	DeVoe Yates and Gabe Hilfer (for "You Hurled Me Into The Depths, Into The Very Heart of The Seas")	Nominated	
2025	Primetime Creative Arts Emmy Awards	Outstanding Period or Fantasy/Sci-Fi Makeup (Non-Prosthetic)	Leigh Ann Yandle, Nataleigh Verrengia, Alexander McPherson, and Lori McCoy Bell (for "Prelude")	Nominated	
2025	Primetime Creative Arts Emmy Awards	Outstanding Sound Editing for a Comedy or Drama Series (Half-Hour)	Nicholas Renbeck, Alexa Zimmerman, Deborah Wallach, Rachel Wardell, Ailin Gong, Michael Brake, and Tommy Stang (for "Prelude")	Nominated	
2025	Primetime Creative Arts Emmy Awards	Outstanding Stunt Coordination for Comedy Programming	Corey DeMeyers	Won	
2025	Set Decorators Society of America Awards	Best Achievement in Décor/Design of a Half-Hour Single-Camera Series	Patrick Cassidy and Richard A. Wright	Nominated	
2026	Writers Guild of America Awards	Episodic Comedy	John Carcieri, Jeff Fradley, Danny R. McBride (for "Prelude")	Won	
