= Jade Pettyjohn =

American actress

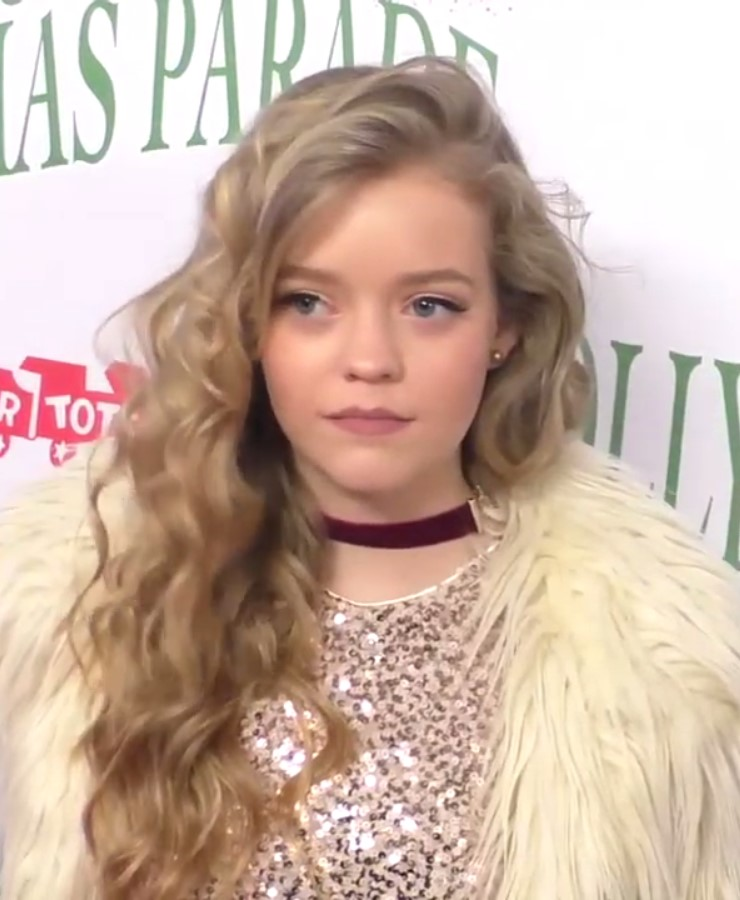
- Pettyjohn in 2016
- Occupation: Actress
- Years active: 2008–present
- Website: www.jadepettyjohn.com

Jade Pettyjohn is an American actress. She is known for her roles as McKenna Brooks in An American Girl: McKenna Shoots for the Stars, as Summer on the Nickelodeon television series School of Rock, as Lexie Richardson on the Hulu drama television miniseries Little Fires Everywhere, and as Grace Sullivan on the ABC series Big Sky.

== Life and career ==
Prior to Pettyjohn's film and television career, she performed alongside a local children's song and dance troupe from the age of seven. Pettyjohn has also played various roles in several television series, such as in Revolution, Criminal Minds: Suspect Behavior, Grimm, The United States Of Tara, The Mentalist, and Pure Genius. She co-starred in the Nickelodeon Original Movie Rufus 2 which aired in January 2017.

In September 2017, Pettyjohn was cast as Laura Dern's daughter in the movie Trial by Fire. Additionally, she was added to the cast of the crime thriller film Destroyer, and appeared in the film Against All Enemies. In late 2018, Pettyjohn was cast in Deadwood: The Movie, playing the role of Caroline, a newcomer to the town of Deadwood. In 2019 she was cast in the Hulu television series Little Fires Everywhere playing Lexie Richardson, the daughter of Reese Witherspoon's character. In June 2020, it was announced that Pettyjohn had been cast in the ABC television drama series Big Sky, playing Grace Sullivan who is kidnapped along with her older sister Danielle (Natalie Alyn Lind).

Pettyjohn is a Scientologist.

== Filmography ==
=== Film ===
Year	Title	Role	Notes
2014	Dakota's Summer	Summer Jennings	
2015	Shangri-La Suite	Young Karen	
2016	Girl Flu.	Bird	
2017	The Black Ghiandola	Bri	Short film
2018	Destroyer	Shelby	
2018	Trial by Fire	Julie Gilbert	
2019	Seberg	Jenny Kowalski	
2023	Fish Out of Water	Lexi	Short film
2024	AMFAD All My Friends Are Dead	Sarah	
2025	Under the Lights	Shelby	

=== Television ===
Year	Title	Role	Notes
2008	The Mentalist	Julie Sands	Episode: "Ladies in Red"
2010	United States of Tara	Kammy	Episodes: "Trouble Junction", "The Truth Hurts"
2011	Criminal Minds: Suspect Behavior	Samantha Weller	Episode: "Two of a Kind"
2012	Grimm	April Granger	Episode: "The Bottle Imp"
2012	An American Girl: McKenna Shoots for the Stars	McKenna Brooks	Television film
2012–2013	Revolution	Charlie Matheson (11 Years) / Young Samantha	3 episodes
2014	The Last Ship	Ava Tophet	Recurring role, 6 episodes
2014	All I Want for Christmas	Megan Farley	Television film
2014–2015	Henry Danger	Chloe Hartman	3 episodes
2015	Nickelodeon's Ho Ho Holiday Special	Herself	Television special
2016–2018	School of Rock	Summer Hathaway	45 episodes
2016	Pure Genius	Madeline Sorenson	Episode: "A Bunker Hill Christmas"
2017	Rufus 2	Kat	Television film
2017	Nickelodeon's Not So Valentine's Special	Herself	Television special
2017	Nickelodeon's Sizzling Summer Camp Special	Herself	Television special
2017	Nickelodeon's Ultimate Halloween Haunted House	Herself	Television special
2017	Nicky, Ricky, Dicky & Dawn	Rose Dirken	Episode: "The Wonderful Wizard of Quads"
2019	Deadwood: The Movie	Caroline Woolgarden	Television film
2019	The Righteous Gemstones	Dot Nancy	3 episodes
2019	Middle School Moguls	Celeste	4 episodes, main voice role
2020	Little Fires Everywhere	Lexie Richardson	7 episodes
2020–2021	Big Sky	Grace Sullivan	8 episodes
2022	Fire Country	Riley Leone	Episodes: "The Fresh Prince of Edgewater", "Where There's Smoke..."
2024	Monsters: The Lyle and Erik Menendez Story	Jamie Pisarcik	3 episodes
2025	Doctor Odyssey	Daphne	Episode: "Casino Week"
2025	The Rookie	Aimee	Episode: "The Return"
2025	Grey's Anatomy	Dr. Dani Spencer	Recurring role; season 22

=== Video games ===
- World of Final Fantasy (2016), as Girl Who Forgot Her Name

== Awards and nominations ==
Year	Award	Category	Work	Result	Ref.
2017	Northeast Film Festival	Best Supporting Actress in a Short Film	The Black Ghiandola	Won	
2018	Young Entertainer Award	Best Young Ensemble	School of Rock	Nominated	
