= Mary Hollis Inboden =

American actress and writer

- Born: 1985 or 1986 (age 40–41); Bono, Arkansas, United States
- Occupation: Actress
- Years active: 2011–present

Mary Hollis Inboden is an American actress and writer best known for appearing on the TV shows The Real O'Neals, Kevin Can F**k Himself, and The Righteous Gemstones.

== Early life ==
Inboden is a survivor of the 1998 Westside Middle School shooting in Jonesboro, Arkansas, which occurred when she was 12 years old. Her best friend, Paige Herring, was one of the victims killed during the event.

== Career ==
In 2011, Inboden, working with The New Colony theatre company, collaborated on a script based on her experiences as a survivor of a school shooting. The play was named The Warriors and premiered in 2011 in Chicago. A subsequent benefit performance was performed after the Sandy Hook Elementary School shooting.

Inboden began working in television in 2011 appearing in The Chicago Code. In 2016, she was a series regular on The Real O'Neals. The show ran for two seasons before being cancelled in 2017.

In 2019, Inboden appeared as a regular on American Princess.

Inboden was cast as a regular on Kevin Can F**k Himself, which debuted in 2021. Inboden revealed that she was initially reluctant to take the part of Patty, fearing she would be a stereotypical sidekick, but grew to enjoy the character's arc over the course of the series.

== Filmography ==
Television and film roles
Year	Title	Role	Notes
2011	The Chicago Code	Mary	4 episodes
2011–2012	Boss	Jackie / Sentinel Colleague / Jackie Shope	Recurring Role
2012–2013	Kam Kardashian	BFF	4 episodes
2013	Doubt	Tracy Lang	TV movie
2014	Funemployed	Geena	2 episodes
2016–2017	The Real O'Neals	Jodi O'Neal	Series regular
2017	Speechless	Darla	Episode: "F-I-- FIRST S-E-- SECOND F-- FIRST DAY"
2017	Nathan for You	Young Frances	Episode: "Finding Frances"
2018	Superstore	Brandi	Episode: "Angels and Mermaids"
2018	Love	Angela	Episode: "You're My Gran Torino"
2018	Here and Now	Miss Lisa	2 episodes
2018	NCIS: Los Angeles	Melisa Gates	Episode: "Reentry"
2018	Quadratic Equations	Ms. Bonnet	Short Film
2019	I Hate Kids	Delivery Room Nurse	
2019	The Act	Allison Granger	Episode: "Teeth"
2019	American Princess	Delilah	Series regular
2019	Marriage Story	Associate	
2019–2023	The Righteous Gemstones	Mandy	Recurring Role
2019	Search and Destroy	Tracy	TV movie
2020	Shrill	Connie	Episode: "Waham"
2021–2022	Kevin Can F**k Himself	Patty O'Connor	Main role
2022	Murderville	Kathy	Episode: "The Magician's Assistant"
2023	Moon Blood	Janet	Short film
2024	Curb Your Enthusiasm	Praying Woman	Episode: "No Lessons Learned"
2025	Leverage: Redemption	Bobbi	Episode: "The Scared Stiff Job"
2025	The Paper	Cindy	Episode: "Buddy and the Dude"
2026	Mouse	Shayna	
