= Tony Cavalero =

American actor and comedian

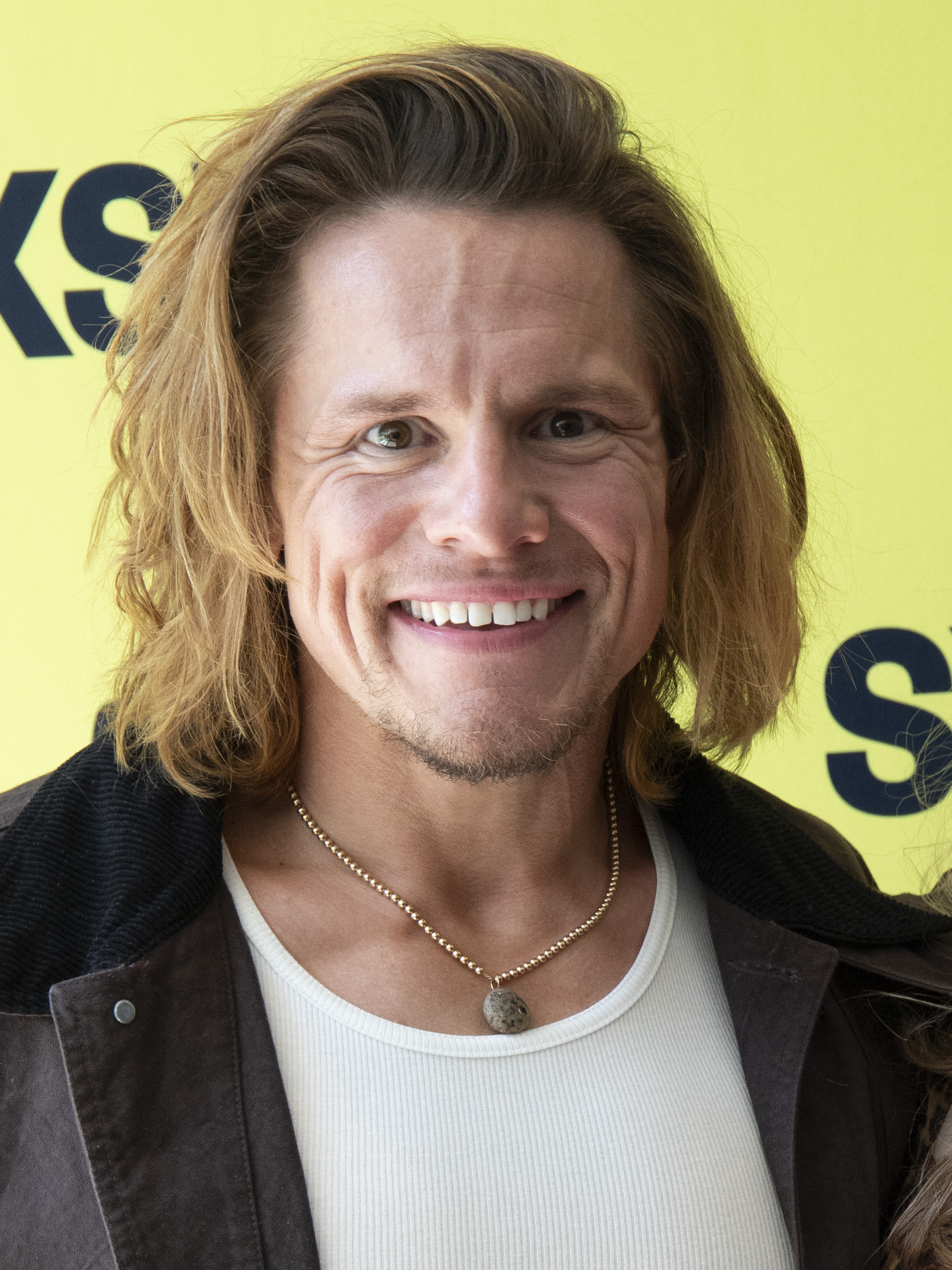
- Cavalero in 2024
- Occupations: Actor; comedian
- Years active: 2005–present
- Spouse: Annie Cavalero (m. 2015)
- Children: 1

Tony Cavalero is an American actor and comedian. He is known for his role as Keefe Chambers on the HBO television series The Righteous Gemstones (2019–2025) and for playing Ozzy Osbourne in the film The Dirt.

== Early life ==
Cavalero attended Poe Middle School and graduated from Annandale High School, where he lettered in varsity football, wrestling, and lacrosse. He is an Eagle Scout and a black belt in Tae Kwon Do. He is a graduate of Virginia Military Institute where he was a four-year varsity lacrosse player. He moved to Los Angeles in 2006 and studied theater at Cal State LA.

== Career ==
Cavalero began acting in 2006. In 2010 he began taking classes with improv company The Groundlings, eventually he was promoted to their Sunday company and later graduated to the main cast. During this time, he was also in an improv group alongside fellow Groundlings comedian Fortune Feimster called "Robert Downey Jr Jr". He was simultaneously working as a janitor in the early years of his membership. Cavalero officially left the group in the 2020s.

In 2014, he was cast as Dewey Finn on the Nickelodeon remake of School of Rock, replacing Jack Black from the 2003 film School of Rock. The series premiered in 2016 and ran for three seasons.

In 2018, he was cast as Ozzy Osbourne in Netflix's biographical film of Mötley Crüe, The Dirt.

In 2019, Cavalero was cast in HBO comedy The Righteous Gemstones as Keefe Chambers.

== Filmography ==
=== Film ===
Year	Title	Role	Notes
2005	Ride or Die	Outlaw #2	
2010	World's End	Elder's Bodyguard	
2011	The Victorville Massacre	Young Lane's Father	
2013	Ghost Team One	Chuck	
2013	Isolated	Ambassador for Peace	
2013	Roundball	Rex Fendo	
2014	Playing It Cool	Charity Water	
2014	Bro, What Happened?	Glenn	
2015	The DUFF	Sweater Guy	
2015	Teeth and Blood	Mayor's Bodyguard #3	
2016	After the Reality	Reg	
2016	Internet Famous	Ice Cream Seller	
2017	Comic Wars: Kaomic	Mental Hospital Employee #2	
2017	An American in Texas	Bill Haynes	
2018	When We First Met	Angus Young	
2018	Avengers of Justice: Farce Wars	Beaverine	
2018	Dog Days	Stanley	
2018	Saturday at the Starlight	Chip	
2019	Rim of the World	Conrad	
2019	The Dirt	Ozzy Osbourne	
2020	The Binge	Pompano Mike	
2021	We Broke Up	Jayson	
2023	It's Not You, It's LA	Brett	
2024	Cold Wallet	Dom	
2024	Operation Taco Gary's	Kyle	
2025	Christy	James Maloney	
2026	Kill Me	TBA	Post-production

=== Television ===
Year	Title	Role	Notes
2009	Flagged for Removal	Snake Dealer	Episode: "Snake Out"
2009	There Will Be Brawl	Magikoopa	Episode: "Debts"
2010	Totally Sketch	Chad	Episode: "Poked"
2010	Def and Dum Show	Himself	TV movie
2011	Son of a Pitch	Johnson	Main role
2012	Gymratz	PJ	TV movie
2012	Stuk	Tyler Jones	TV mini-series
2012	Kickin' It	Teddy Kavanagh	Episode: "Capture the Flag"
2012	Ben and Kate	Donovan	Episode: "Reunion"
2012	Naughty or Nice	Justin Reid	TV movie
2012	Redeeming Dave	Josh	
2013	Crash & Bernstein	Thief	Episode: "Comic Book Crash"
2013	2 Broke Girls	Cronut Craig	Episode: "And the Cronuts"
2013	Adam Devine's House Party	Steve	Episode: "Foam Party"
2013	Aim High	Deuce	10 episodes
2013	Mission: Ford Fiesta Movement	Master Sgt. Gunderson	2 episodes
2013–2015	Hart of Dixie	Stanley Watts	9 episodes
2014	Dads	Hoodie Guy	Episode: "Eli Nightingale"
2014	Robin Banks and the Bank Roberts	Bobby	Main role
2014	Modern Family	Brian	Episode: "Three Dinners"
2014	The Single Life	Brent	Lead role
2015	K.C. Undercover	Wally	2 episodes
2015	Splitting Adam	Magic Mitch	TV movie
2015	Ken Jeong Made Me Do It	Lindberg	TV movie
2015	Kevin from Work	Don	Episode: "Gossip from Work"
2015	Nickelodeon's Ho Ho Holiday Special	Jingles	Television special
2015	Becoming Santa	Jack Frost	TV movie
2015–2019	SuperMansion	Johnny Rabdo (voice)	Recurring role
2016	New Girl	Philip	Episode: "The Decision"
2016	Nicky, Ricky, Dicky & Dawn	JT Steele	Episode: "Mission: Un-Quaddable"
2016	Gentlemen Lobsters	Dylan (voice)	Episode: "Co-Ed Softball"
2016–2018	School of Rock	Dewey Finn	Main role; director: "Don't Know What You Got ('Til It's Gone)"
2017	Glimpse	Chef Moller	Lead role
2017	This Fucking Town	Brett	TV movie
2017	Nickelodeon's Sizzling Summer Camp Special	Jingles	Television special
2017	Nickelodeon's Ultimate Halloween Haunted House	Nurse / Janitor	Television special
2018	Angie Tribeca	Timmy Rhebus	Episode: "Freezing Cold Prestige Drama"
2018	Life in Pieces	Dale	Episode: "Pageant Bike Animals Jerky"
2019	American Princess	The Chode	Episode: "Down There"
2019–2025	The Righteous Gemstones	Keefe Chambers	Main cast
2020	Miracle Workers	Ted Carpenter	3 episodes
2021	Archer	Hijacker (voice)	Episode: "Lowjacked"
2021–2022	The Conners	Aldo	6 episodes
2021–2023	Teenage Euthanasia	Various voices	4 episodes
2022–2024	Big City Greens	Wayne (voice)	7 episodes
2023	Agent Elvis	Flyboy (voice)	Episode: "Cocaine Tuesdays"
2023	Space Junk	Hank Nimbus	2 episodes
2024	Cobra Kai	Shane Page	Episode: "Sleeper"
2024	Creature Commandos	Incel Son (voice)	2 episodes
2024	Die Hart	Agent Fisher	7 episodes
2025–2026	DMV	Vic	Main cast
