= Scott MacArthur =

American actor and writer (born 1979)

- Born: August 6, 1979 (age 46); Chicago, Illinois, U.S.
- Occupations: Actor, writer
- Years active: 2006–present
- Relatives: Hayes MacArthur (brother); Ali Larter (sister-in-law); William F. Farley (step-father)

Scott MacArthur (born August 6, 1979) is an American actor and writer. He is best known for playing Jimmy Shepherd, a main character on the Fox comedy series The Mick.

== Career ==
MacArthur starred in the Fox series The Mick from 2017 to 2018. MacArthur was initially hired as a writer for the series. The Jimmy character was played by Nat Faxon in the original pilot for The Mick, with the knowledge that Faxon would not be able to continue in the role if the pilot got picked up to series. After offering the role to MacArthur, Fox re-shot the pilot prior to the series debut.

MacArthur has also appeared in films, such as The Diabolical (2015) and Answers to Nothing (2011), as well as numerous guest roles on television. He appeared in the 2019 Breaking Bad epilogue film, El Camino: A Breaking Bad Movie, as welder/criminal Neil Kandy. MacArthur appeared in a recurring role in The Righteous Gemstones as Scotty "the Devil", a moronic stuntman turned extortionist.

In September 2024, he was cast in a recurring role on the superhero series Spider-Noir.

In February 2025, MacArthur was cast in Netflix series Running Point as Ness Gordon, the older brother of Kate Hudson's character, Isla Gordon.

== Filmography ==
Film
Year	Title	Role	Notes
2011	Answers to Nothing	Allan	
2012	Good Satan	Frank	
2012	The Longer Day of Happiness	Bob	
2012	The Motel Life	Officer Mori	
2013	Ghost Team One	Elder Ammon	
2013	Coldwater	Gillis	
2016	The Diabolical	Officer Chambers	
2017	Chuck Hank and the San Diego Twins	Marcel	
2019	Rim of the World	Lou	
2019	El Camino: A Breaking Bad Movie	Neil Kandy	
2020	The Babysitter: Killer Queen	Leeroy	
2021	The Starling	Ralph the Trucker	
2021	Halloween Kills	Big John	
2022	Family Squares	Chad Worth	Also N & O Camera Operator
2023	No Hard Feelings	Jim	
2024	Suncoast	Sweet n' Low	
2024	Incoming	Dennis	
TBA	The Fifth Wheel		Filming

Television
Year	Title	Role	Notes
2006	Mad TV	Scott	Episode #12.7
2007	Numb3rs	Bidder Wearing Glasses	Episode: "Graphic"
2008	Medium	Anton	Episode: "To Have and to Hold"
2008	Mad Men	Jim	Episode: "For Those Who Think Young"
2011	Perfect Couples	Trevor	Episode: "Perfect Exes"
2011	Jimmy Kimmel Live!	Hap/Marine	Episodes #9.94 and #9.122
2011–2012	How to Be a Gentleman	Tom	2 episodes
2012	Body of Proof	Rob Martin	Episode: "Identity"
2012	NCIS: Los Angeles	Neil Barlow	Episode: "Sans Voir (Part I)"
2013	NCIS	Petty Officer Second Class Luke Grismer	Episode: "Shabbat Shalom"
2014	The Mindy Project	Bush	Episode: "What About Peter?"
2016	Angie Tribeca	Gordon Manhattan	Episode: "Murder in the First Class"
2017–2018	The Mick	Jimmy Shepherd	Main role, 35 episodes
2019	Weird City	Ray	Episode: "Chonathan & Mulia & Barsley & Phephanie"
2019	Florida Girls	Devo	2 episodes
2019	The Righteous Gemstones	Scotty/The Devil	8 episodes
2020	Superstore	Benny	Episode: "Cereal Bar"
2021	Lucifer	Adam	Episode: "My Best Fiend's Wedding"
2021	Total Badass Wrestling	Mitch Marvelous	Main role, 10 episodes
2022–2023	Killing It	Brock	13 episodes
2023	History of the World, Part II	WV Man	2 episodes
2023	Bubble Guppies	Billy Joe Strumlouder (voice)	Episode: "Trouble in Harmony Valley!"
2023	Physical	Rusty	2 episodes
2024	The Vince Staples Show	Officer Boucher	Episode: "Pink House"
2024	It's Florida, Man	Lawyer Mike	Episode: "Mugshot"
2024	St. Denis Medical	Santa	Episode: "Ho-Ho-Hollo"
2025–2026	Universal Basic Guys	Coach / Bobby (voice)	3 episodes
2025–present	Running Point	Ness Gordon	Main role
2026	Rooster	Coach Jake	5 episodes
2026	Spider-Noir	Perry	Recurring role
