= Valyn Hall =

American actress (born 1985)

- Born: September 4, 1985 (age 40); Atlanta, Georgia, U.S.
- Occupation: Actress
- Known for: The Righteous Gemstones

Valyn Hall (born September 4, 1985) is an American actress best known for her role as "Aunt" Tiffany Freeman in The Righteous Gemstones.

== Personal life ==
Valyn Hall was born in Atlanta, Georgia to parents Ed and Lisa Hall. Her older sister, Amber Chaney, is also an actress, and had a minor role in The Hunger Games. In a 2022 Reddit AMA in the r/television subreddit, Hall shared that in addition to her acting career, she is also employed as a UI engineer. She is a fan of the Georgia Bulldogs athletics teams and the Atlanta Braves.

== Filmography ==
=== Television ===
Year	Title	Role	Notes
2004–2005	Higglytown Heroes	Tini	3 episodes
2013	Drop Dead Diva	Tina Lassider	1 episode
2016	Stan Against Evil	Pregnant Woman	1 episode
2018	The Resident	Gloria	1 episode
2018	Star	Paparazzi 1	1 episode
2019	The Act	Kayla	1 episode
2019–2025	The Righteous Gemstones	Tiffany Freeman	Recurring role, 21 episodes

=== Film ===
Year	Title	Role	Notes
2005	Loverboy	Allison (16 years old)	
2006	Art School Confidential	Cute Girl	
2010	Good Intentions	Marcy	
2010	Three of a Kind	Jesse	Short film
2013	+1	Partygoer	Uncredited
2013	The Internship	Waitress with Pappy	
2017	Logan Lucky	CMS Worker #2	Uncredited

=== Video games ===
Year	Title	Role	Notes
2004	Grand Theft Auto: San Andreas	Pedestrian (voice)	
