= Cassidy Freeman =

American actress, musician (born 1982)

- Freeman at Dragon Con in 2026
- Born: April 22, 1982 (age 44); Chicago, Illinois, U.S.
- Education: Middlebury College
- Occupations: Actress, singer, pianist
- Years active: 2006–present
- Spouse: Ben Ellsworth (m. 2019)
- Children: 2
- Relatives: Crispin Freeman (brother)

Cassidy Freeman (born April 22, 1982) is an American actress and musician. She is known for her roles as Tess Mercer in The CW's superhero drama Smallville, Amber Gemstone in the HBO series The Righteous Gemstones, Sage in the series The Vampire Diaries, and Cady Longmire in the A&E/Netflix modern western Longmire.

== Early life and education ==
Freeman was born in Chicago, Illinois. Her father comes from a Russian Jewish family, while her mother is Catholic of English ancestry. She is the youngest of four children, with three brothers. Her brother Crispin Freeman is a voice actor, while her brother Clark is an actor and musician.

== Career ==
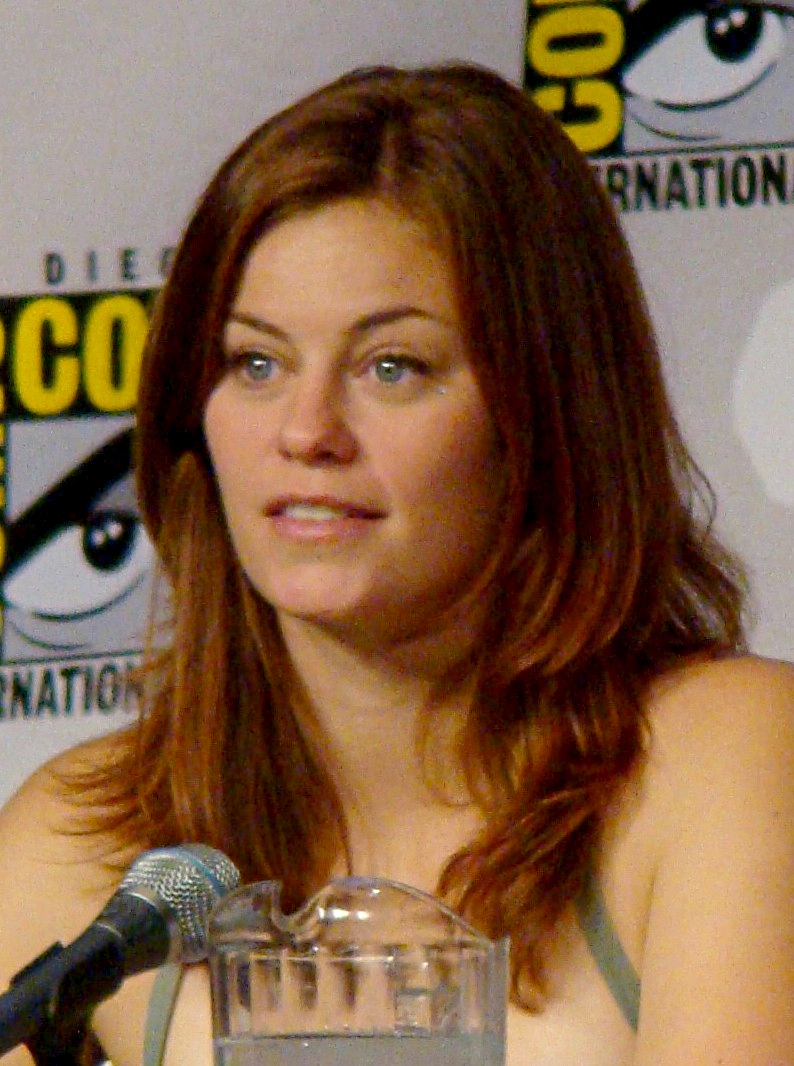
Freeman in 2010

=== Acting ===
Freeman has appeared in several shorts, feature films and television series. Freeman played the leading role of Veronica Sharpe in the 2006 short film Razor Sharp, which won "Best Action Film" at the 2007 Comic-Con International Independent Film Festival. She also starred in the 2010 thriller film YellowBrickRoad.

In September 2008, she began starring in The CW's Superman-inspired drama Smallville where she played Tess Mercer after the departure of Michael Rosenbaum's Lex Luthor and continued in this role until the show ended in May 2011.

On January 13, 2012, Freeman was confirmed to have a brief three-episode run as Sage, in the third season of The CW's fantasy drama The Vampire Diaries. Between 2012 and 2017, Freeman starred as Cady Longmire in the A&E and (later) Netflix crime drama Longmire.

In 2016, she played the Russian spy Eva Azarova in a two-episode crossover in NCIS and NCIS: New Orleans; she returned as Azarova in two 2017 episodes of NCIS: New Orleans. She co-starred alongside Will Patton in The Forever Purge (2021), the fifth film in The Purge franchise. From 2019 to 2025, Freeman starred as Amber Gemstone in the HBO series The Righteous Gemstones.

=== Music ===
Freeman, her brother Clark Freeman, and Andy Mitton formed a band called The Real D'Coy, in which Freeman sings and plays the piano.

=== Allegations against Jeremy Piven ===
In November 2017, Freeman accused actor Jeremy Piven of predatory behavior, saying in an Instagram post "I know what you did and attempted to do to me when I was far too young." She came forward with her allegations after actress Ariane Bellamar accused Piven of sexual harassment.

== Philanthropy ==
While a cast member of Smallville, The CW wrote that Freeman was an active member of Heal the Bay, a Santa Monica, California, environmental group. The network also wrote that Freeman volunteered with the Virginia Avenue Project, a Santa Monica nonprofit that uses the performing arts in a free, after-school program.

== Filmography ==
=== Film ===
Year	Title	Role	Notes
2006	Razor Sharp	Veronica Sharpe	Short film
2006	Clock		Short film
2007	Finishing the Game	Shirley	
2008	Starlet	Courtney	Short film
2009	Shades of Gray	Lisa	Short film
2009	You've Reached Richarde & Gribbeen	Theresa	Short film
2010	YellowBrickRoad	Erin Luger	
2012	Guitar Face	Hope	Short film
2013	Brahmin Bulls	Ellie	
2014	One Last Look	Kate	Short film
2014	Don't Look Back	Peyton Lake	
2016	We Go On	Young Charlotte	
2016	Fender Bender	Jennifer	
2017	Cortez	Rosie	
2021	The Forever Purge	Cassie Tucker	
2026	Chasing Summer	Marissa	Post-production

=== Television ===
Year	Title	Role	Notes
2007	An Accidental Christmas	Kristine	TV movie
2008	Austin Golden Hour	Charlie	TV movie
2008	Cold Case	Laura McKinney (1991)	Episode: "True Calling"
2008–2011	Smallville	Tess Mercer	Main cast (seasons 8–10)
2009	Buzz	Serena Zorn	TV movie
2009	CSI: Crime Scene Investigation	Off. Donna Grayson	Episode: "Coup de Grace"
2011	CSI: NY	Devon Hargrove	Episode: "Indelible"
2011	The Playboy Club	Frances Dunhill	1 episode (+ 3 unaired episodes)
2012	CSI: Miami	Connie Jaden	Episode: "No Good Deed"
2012	The Vampire Diaries	Sage	3 episodes
2012–2017	Longmire	Cady Longmire	Main cast
2013	Once Upon a Time	Jacqueline 'Jack'	Episode: "Tiny"
2016	NCIS	Eva Azarova	Episode: "Sister City, Part I"
2016	Stitchers	Ellie	Episode: "Hack Me If You Can"
2016–2017	NCIS: New Orleans	Eva Azarova	3 episodes
2017	Doubt	ADA Abby Burris	Recurring role
2019–2025	The Righteous Gemstones	Amber Gemstone	Main cast
2025	Paradise	First Lady Jessica Bradford	Recurring role
