= 2nd Hollywood Critics Association TV Awards =

2022 American television programming awards

- Date: August 13, 2022 (Broadcast Network / Cable); August 14, 2022 (Streaming)
- Site: The Beverly Hilton; Los Angeles, California
- Hosted by: Dulcé Sloan (August 13); Cameron Esposito (August 14)
- Most wins: Severance; The White Lotus (5)
- Most nominations: Severance; This Is Us (12)
- Website: hollywoodcriticsassociation.com

Television/radio coverage
- Network: YouTube

The 2nd Hollywood Critics Association TV Awards, presented by the Hollywood Critics Association, took place on August 13 and 14, 2022, at The Beverly Hilton in Los Angeles, California, and streamed live on YouTube. The two-night event focused on broadcast network and cable awards on the 13th and streaming platforms on the 14th; Dulcé Sloan hosted on night one and Cameron Esposito hosted on night two. 60 categories were handed out, including new categories dedicated to directing, writing, short-form and international series. The nominations were announced on July 7, 2022.

The broadcast network and cable nominees were announced by Alexandra Breckenridge, Reign Edwards, and Ronen Rubinstein; they were joined by HCA members Yong Chavez and Jami Philbrick. This Is Us led the nominations with 12, followed by Succession with 11. Chrissy Metz and Susan Kelechi Watson announced the streaming nominees a few hours later; they were joined by HCA members Landon Johnson and Kiyra Lynn. Severance led the nominations, also with 12, followed by Ted Lasso with 11. Channelwise, HBO led the nominations with 65, followed by Apple TV+ with 52 and Netflix with 50.

Severance and The White Lotus won the most awards with five total each, followed by Abbott Elementary, Better Call Saul and Dopesick with four apiece.

== Winners and nominees ==
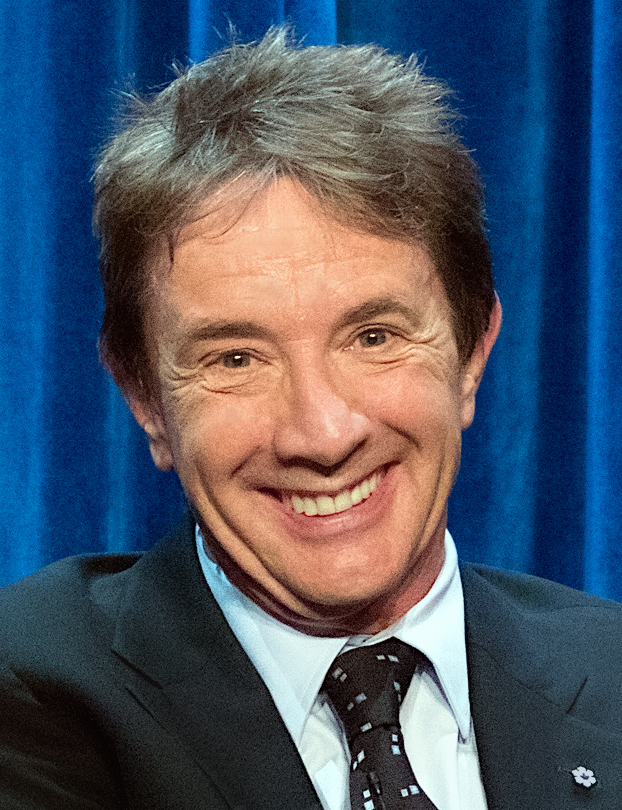
Martin Short, Best Actor in a Streaming Series, Comedy winner

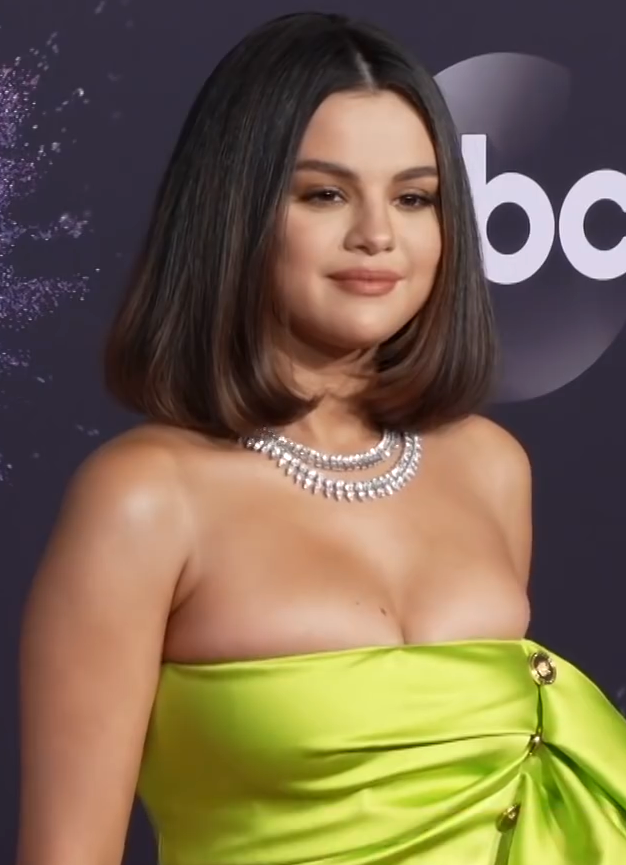
Selena Gomez, Best Actress in a Streaming Series, Comedy winner

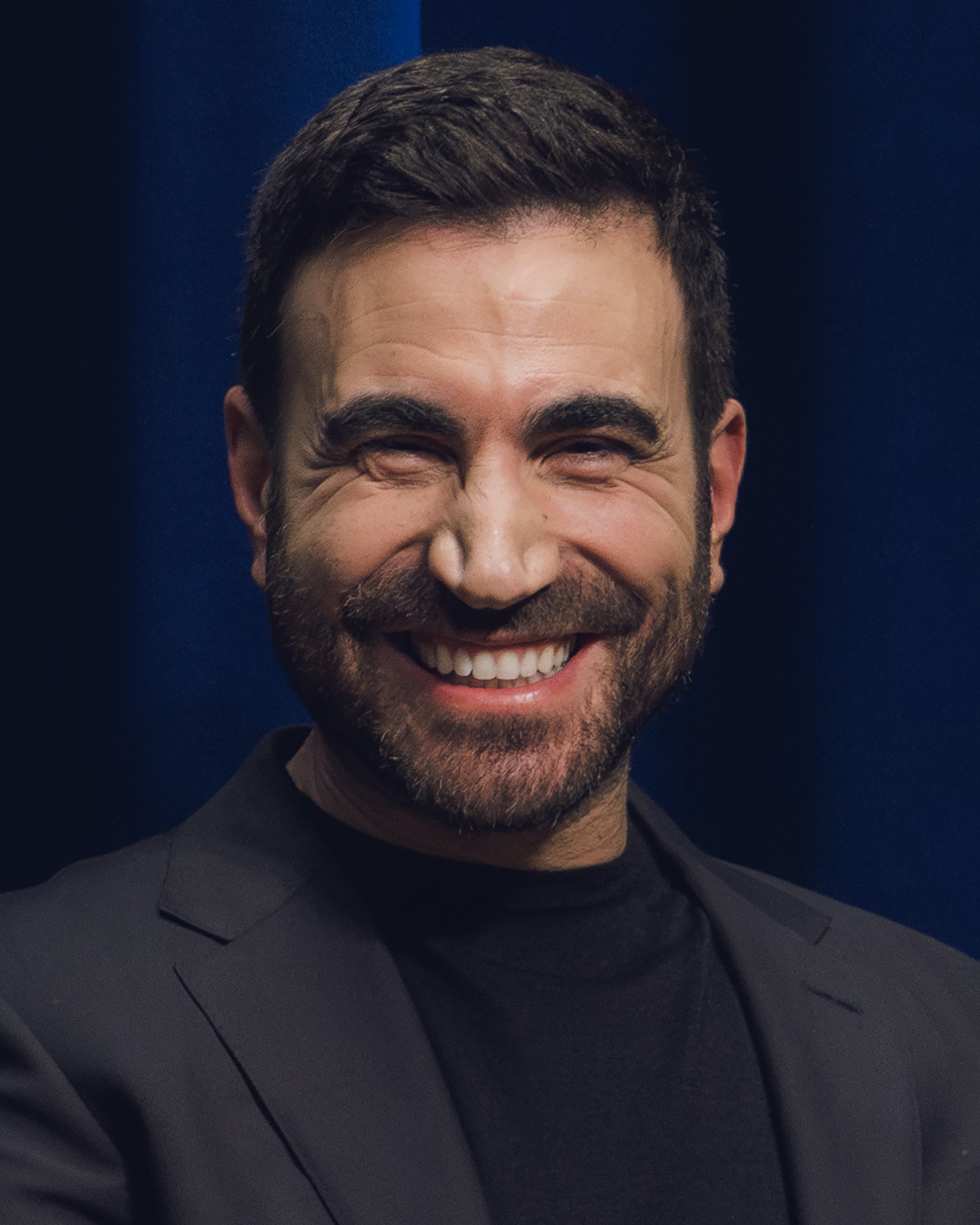
Brett Goldstein, Best Supporting Actor in a Streaming Series, Comedy winner

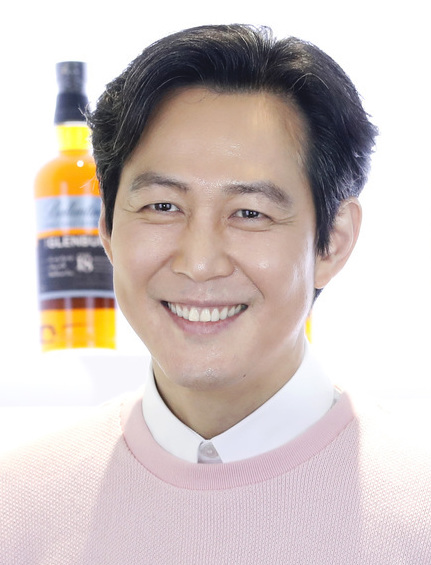
Lee Jung-jae, Best Actor in a Streaming Series, Drama winner

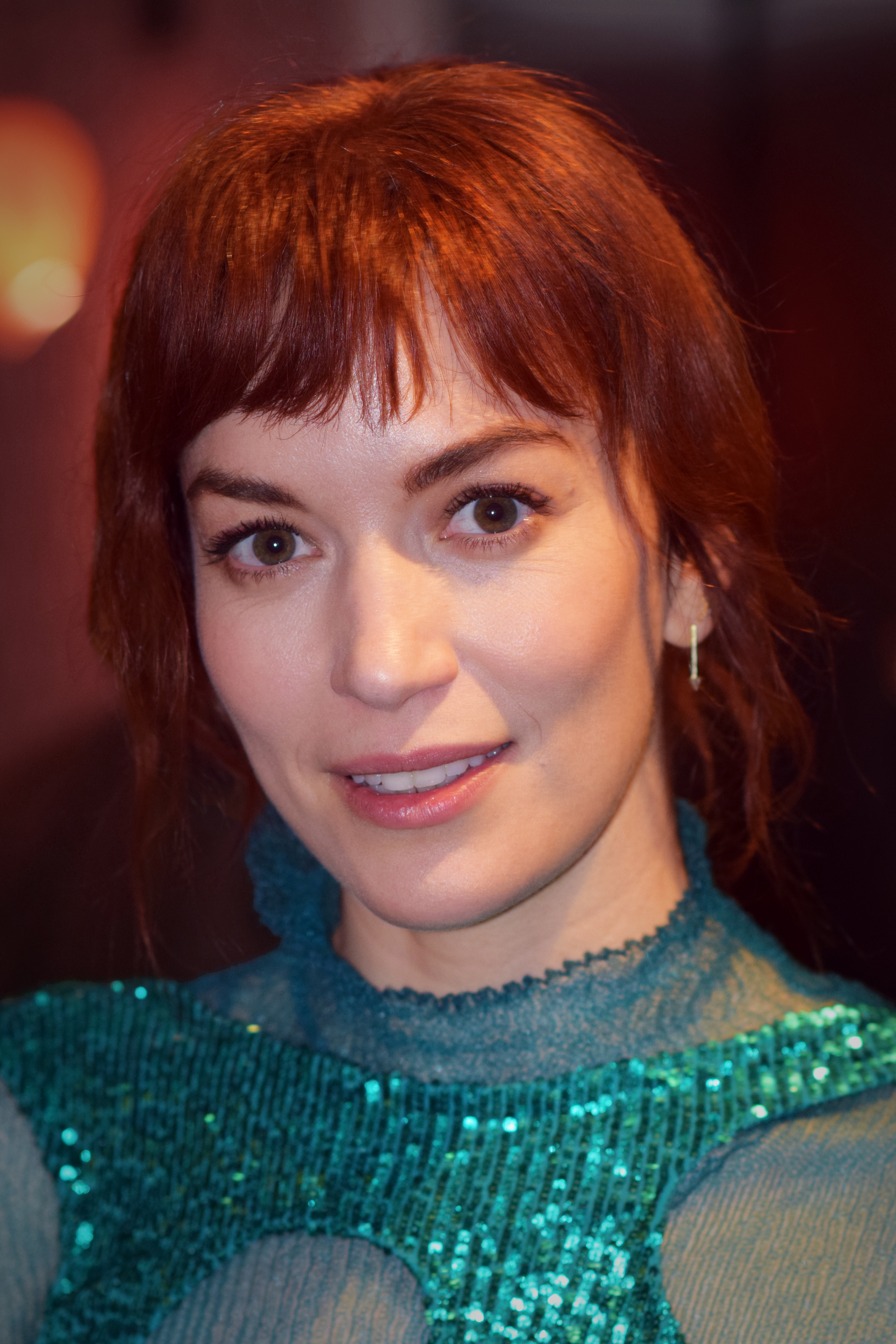
Britt Lower, Best Actress in a Streaming Series, Drama co-winner

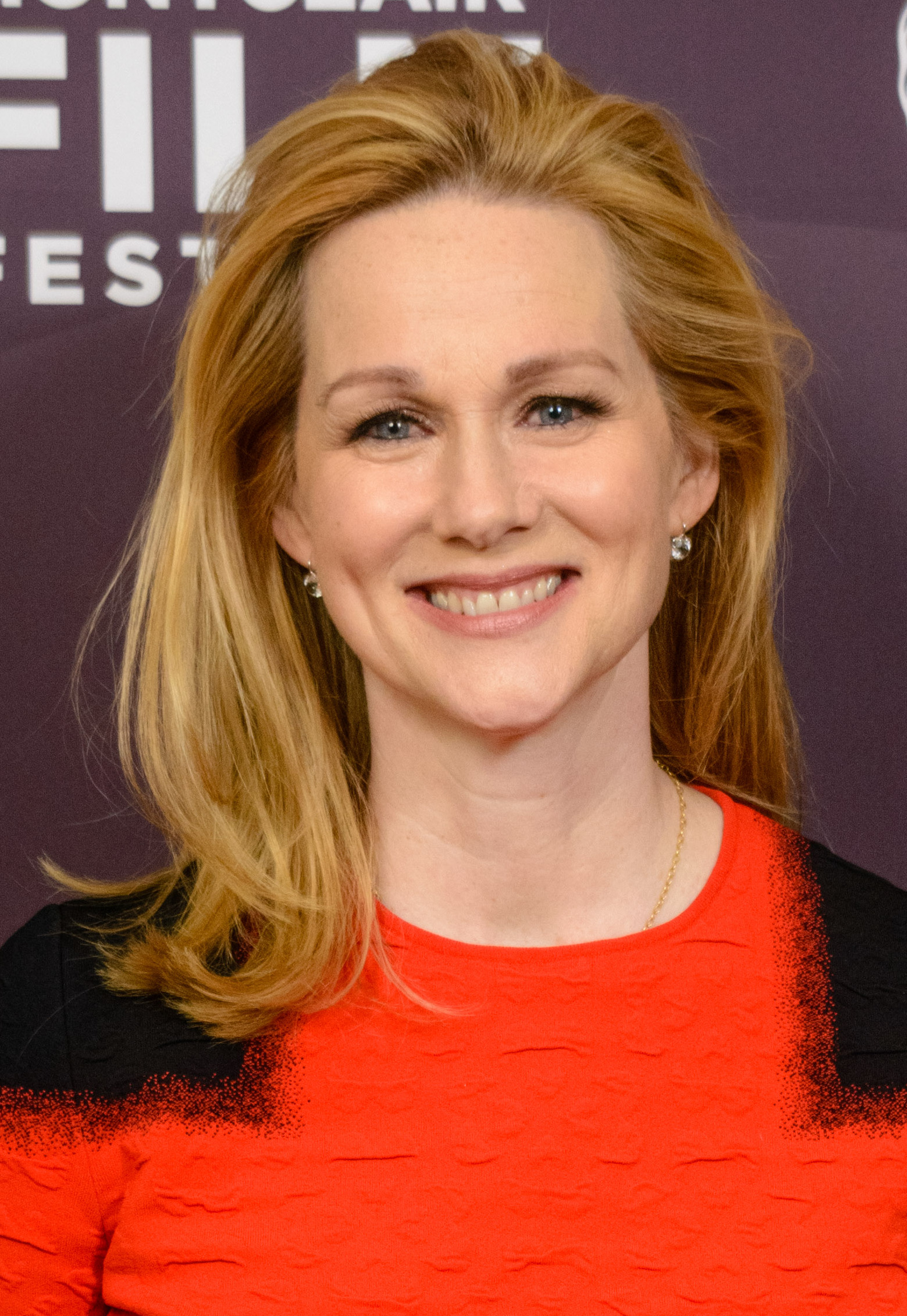
Laura Linney, Best Actress in a Streaming Series, Drama co-winner

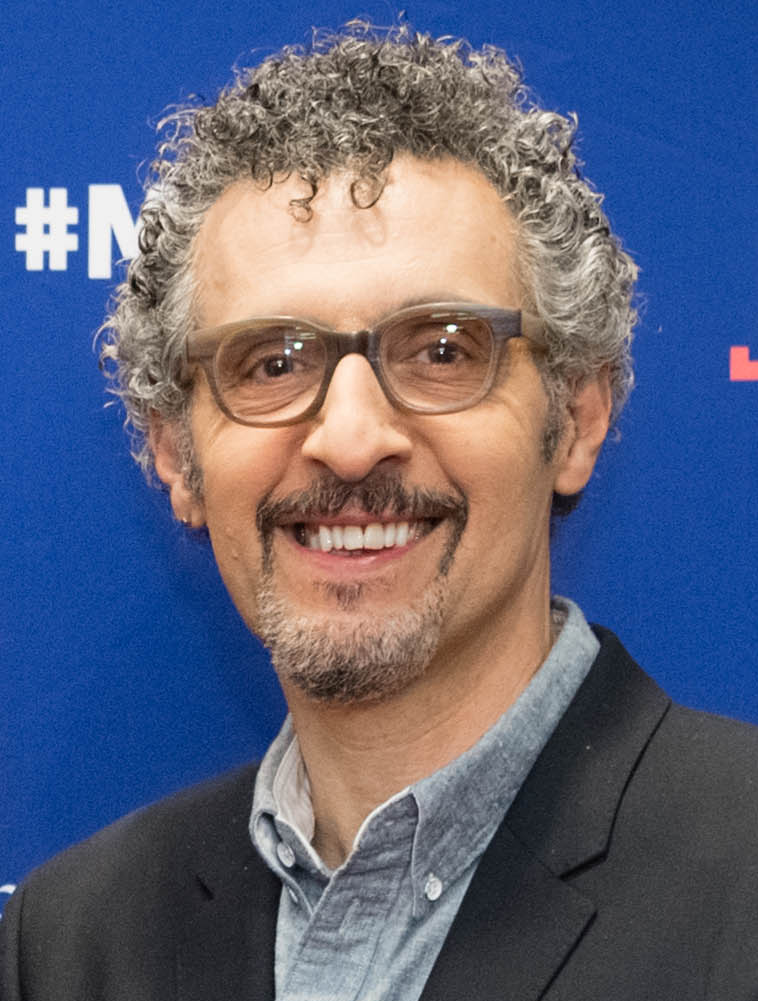
John Turturro, Best Supporting Actor in a Streaming Series, Drama winner

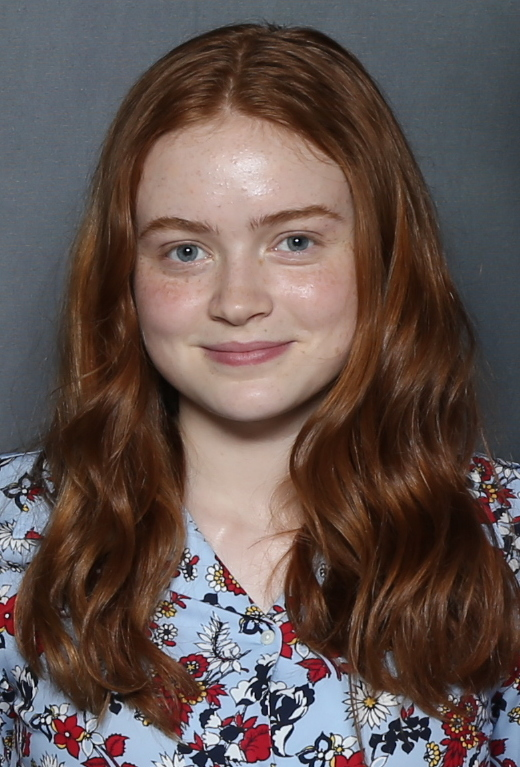
Sadie Sink, Best Supporting Actress in a Streaming Series, Drama winner

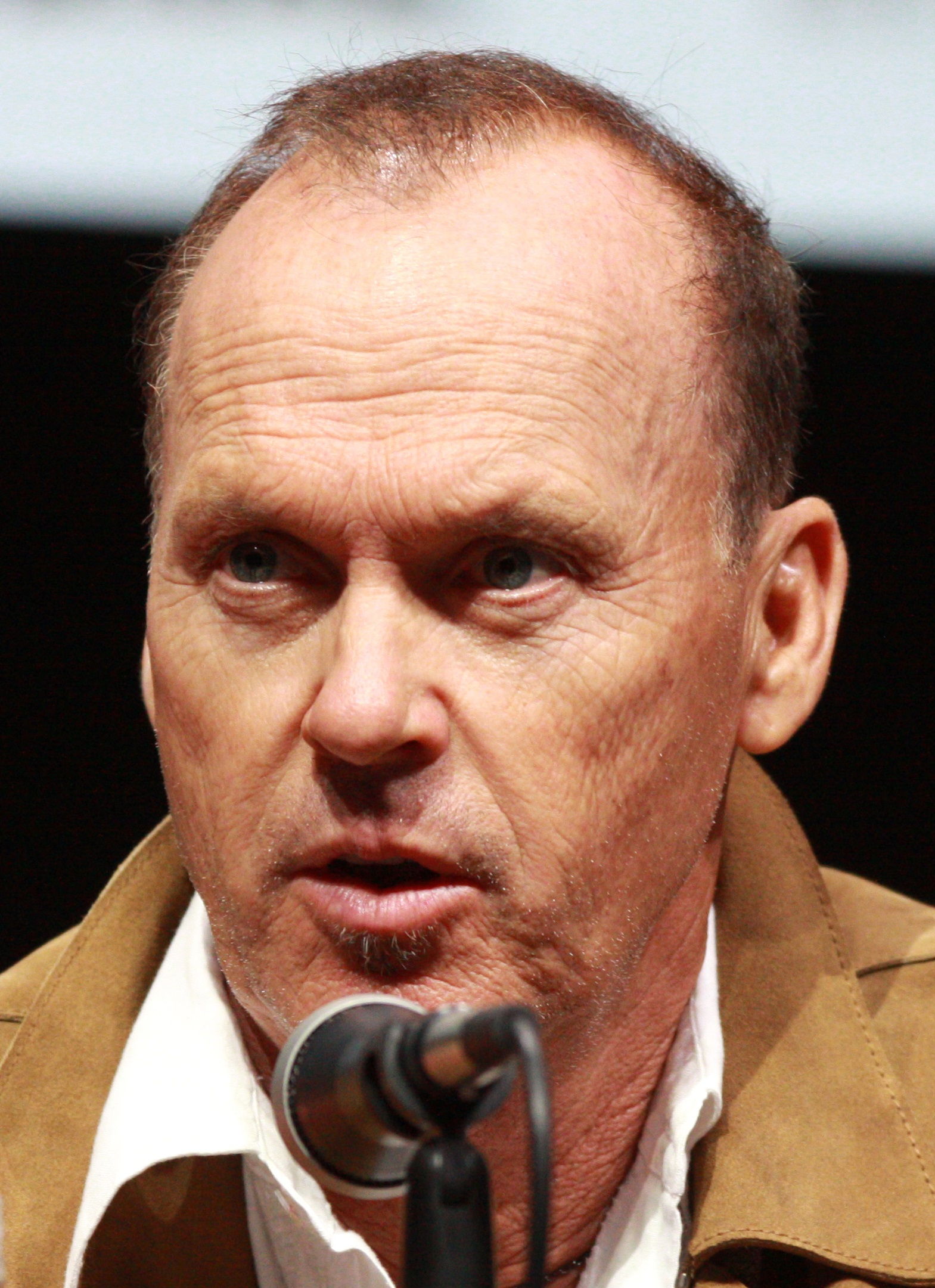
Michael Keaton, Best Actor in a Streaming Limited or Anthology Series or Movie winner

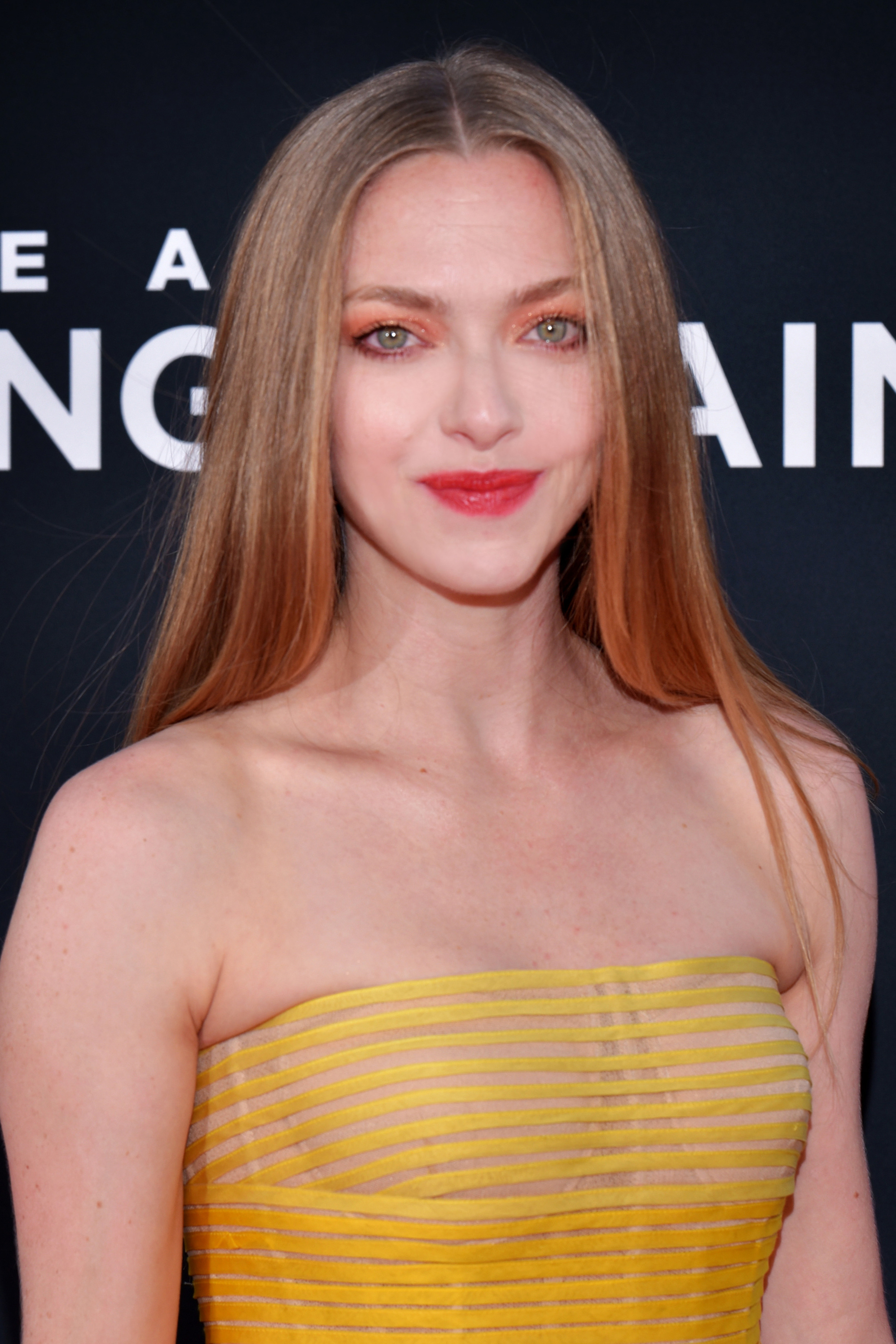
Amanda Seyfried, Best Actress in a Streaming Limited or Anthology Series or Movie winner

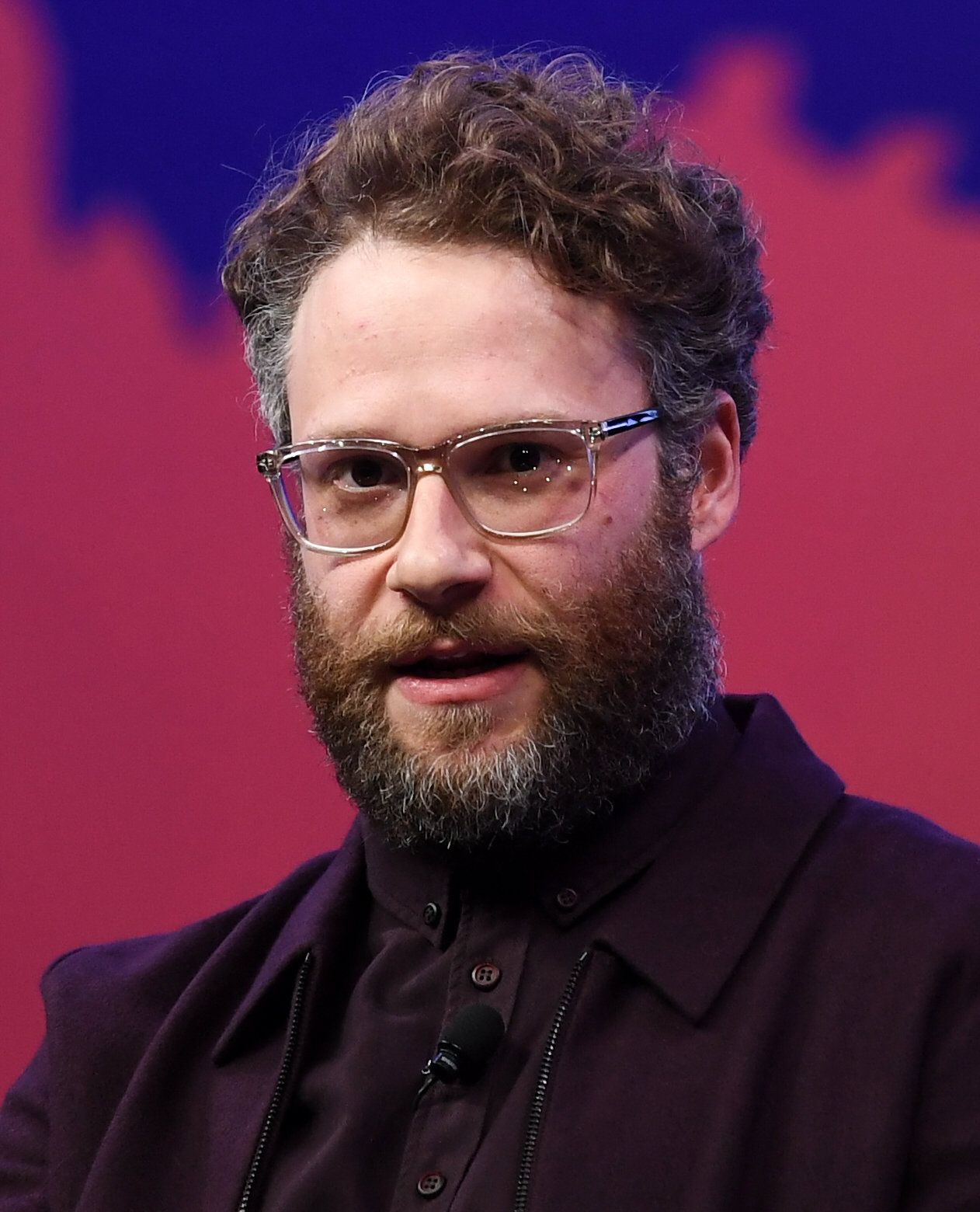
Seth Rogen, Best Supporting Actor in a Streaming Limited or Anthology Series or Movie winner

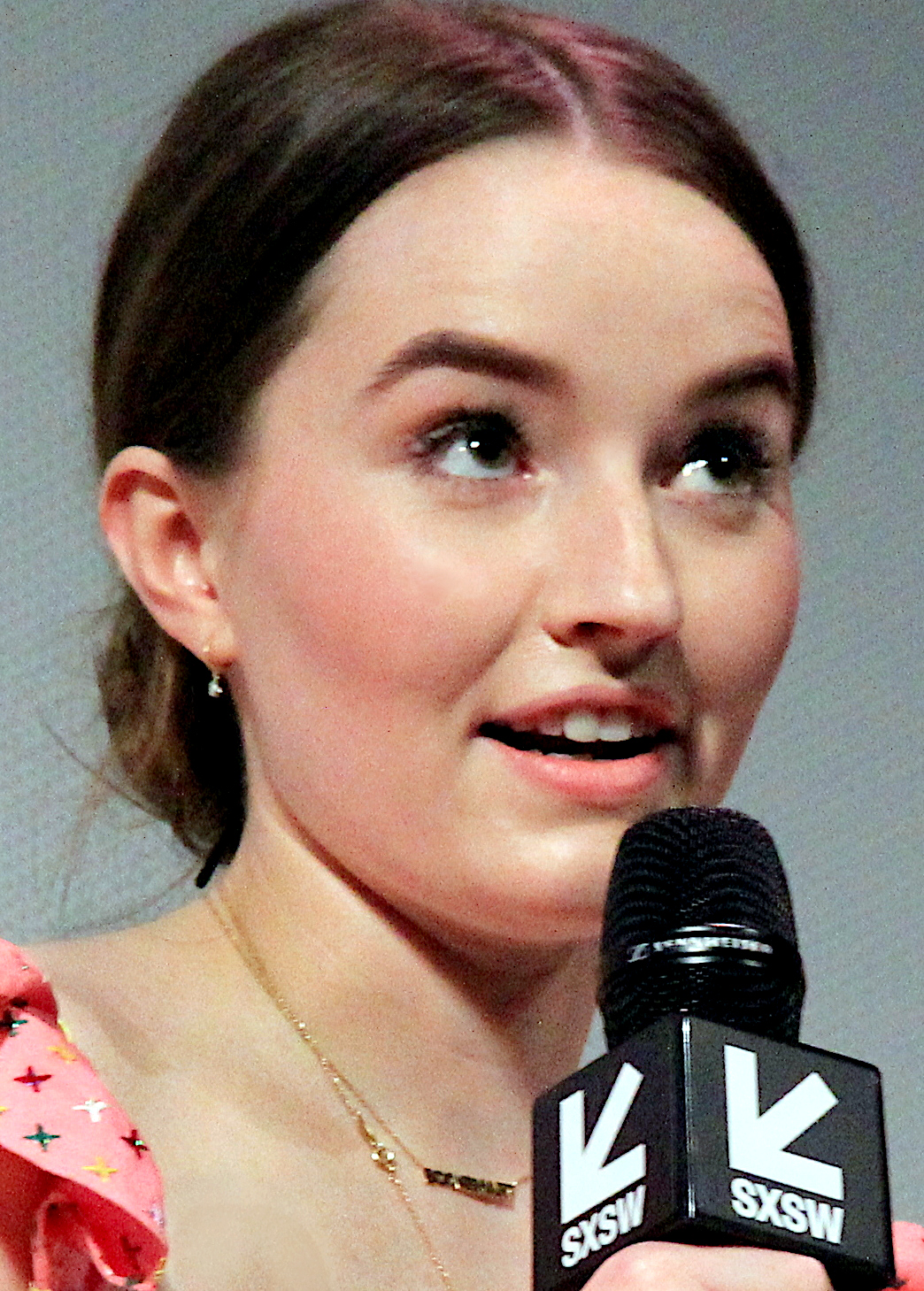
Kaitlyn Dever, Best Supporting Actress in a Streaming Limited or Anthology Series or Movie winner

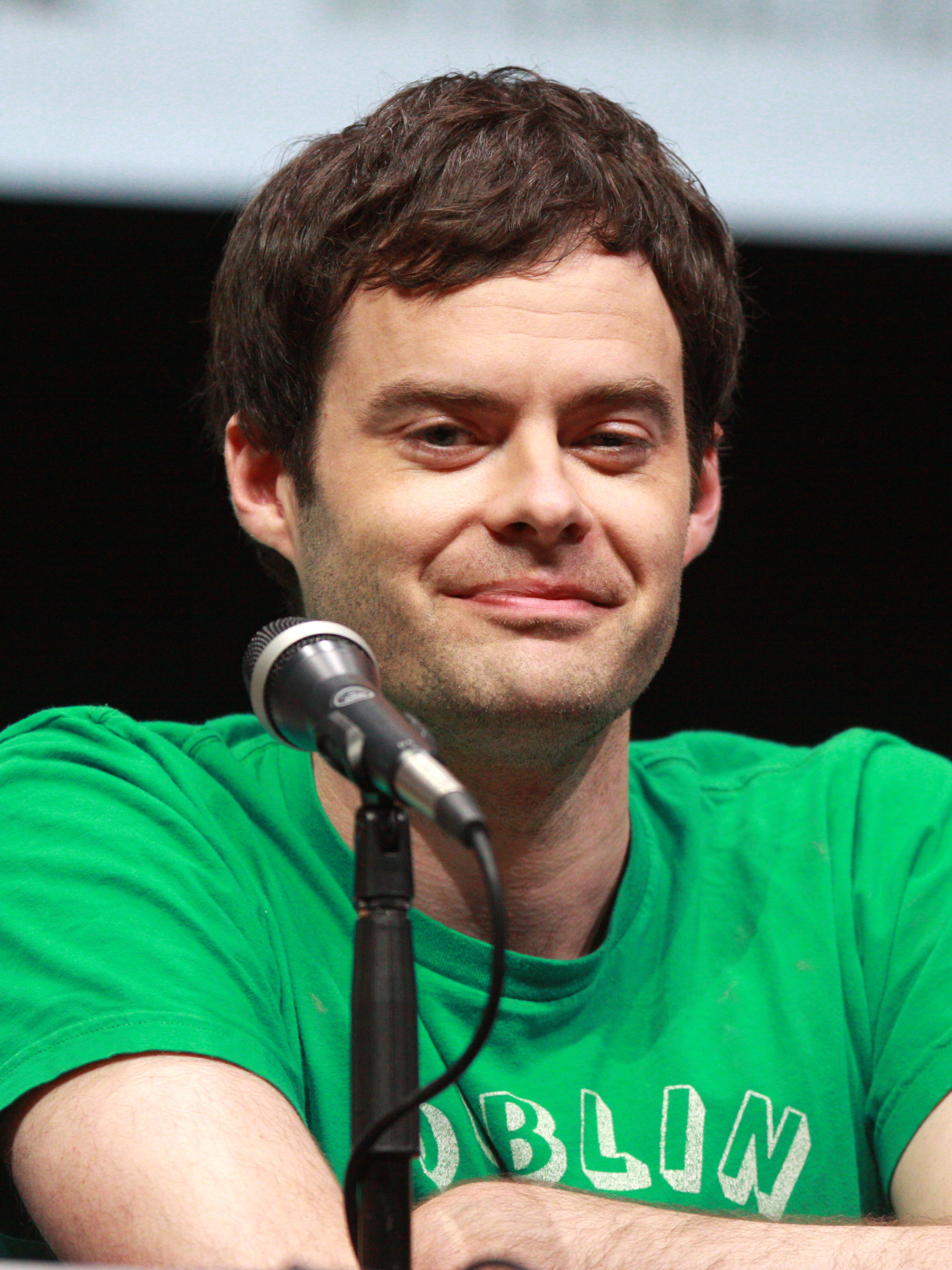
Bill Hader, Best Actor in a Broadcast Network or Cable Series, Comedy and Best Directing in a Broadcast Network or Cable Series, Comedy winner

Quinta Brunson, Best Actress in a Broadcast Network or Cable Series, Comedy and Best Directing in a Broadcast Network or Cable Series, Comedy winner

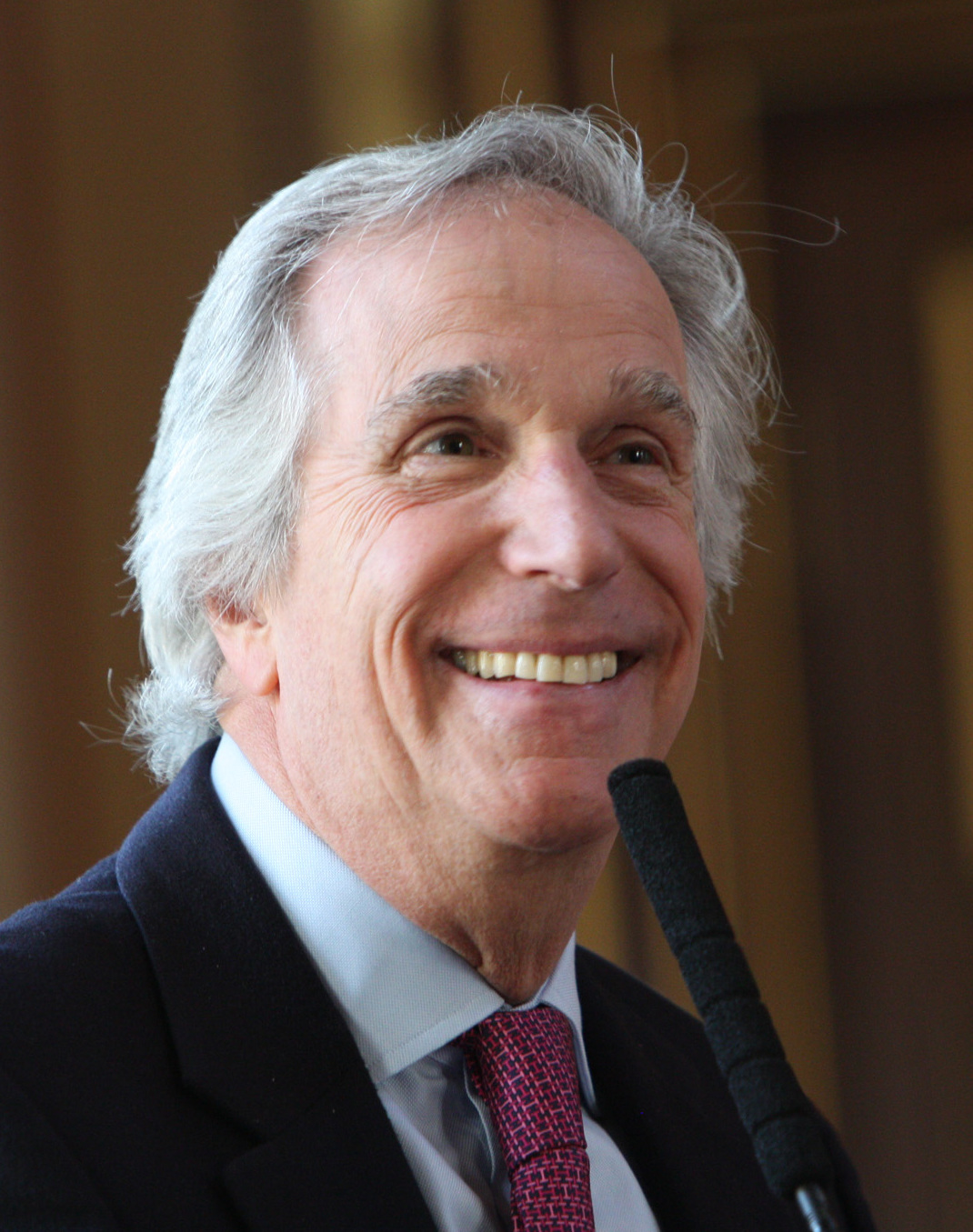
Henry Winkler, Best Supporting Actor in a Broadcast Network or Cable Series, Comedy winner

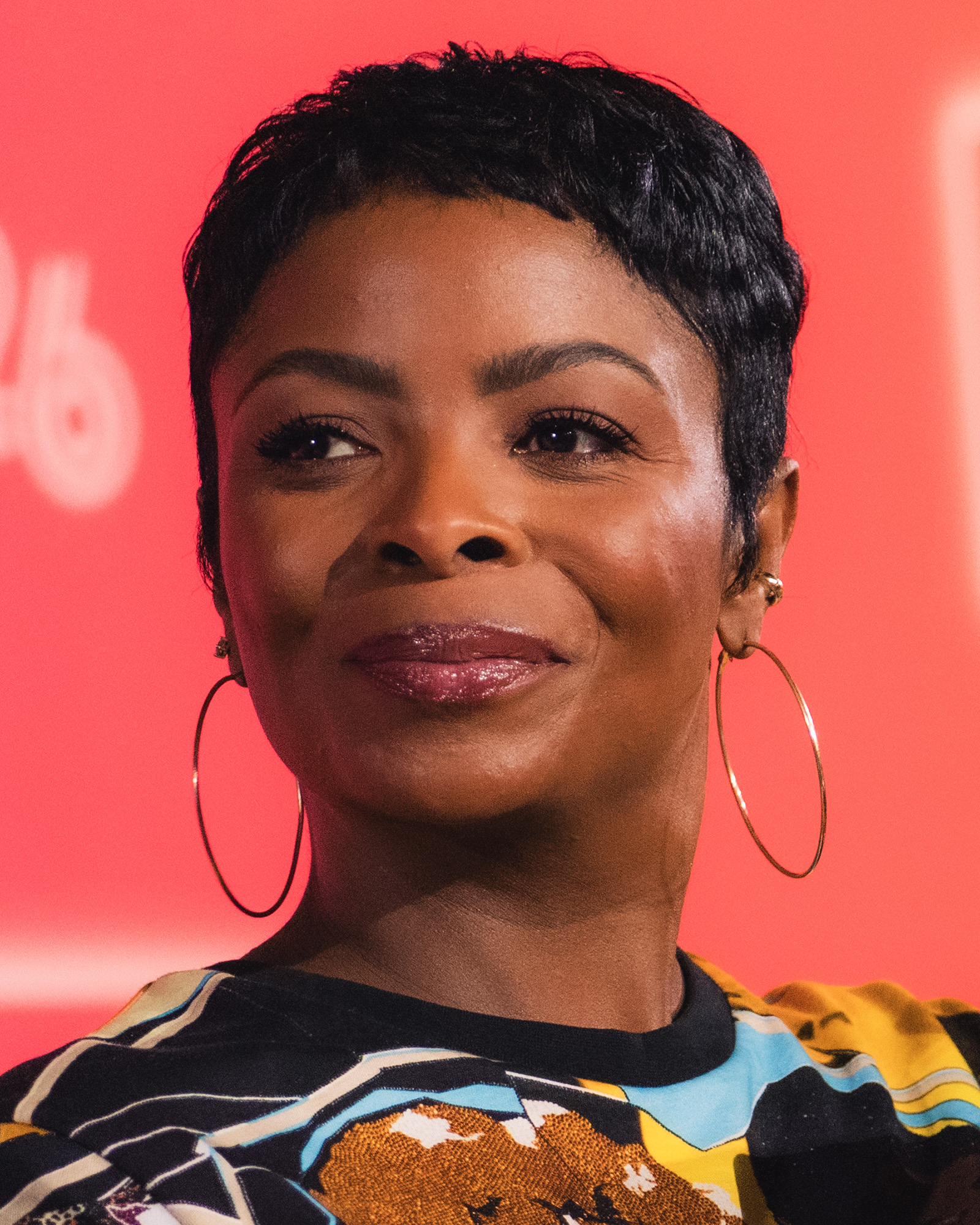
Janelle James, Best Supporting Actress in a Broadcast Network or Cable Series, Comedy winner

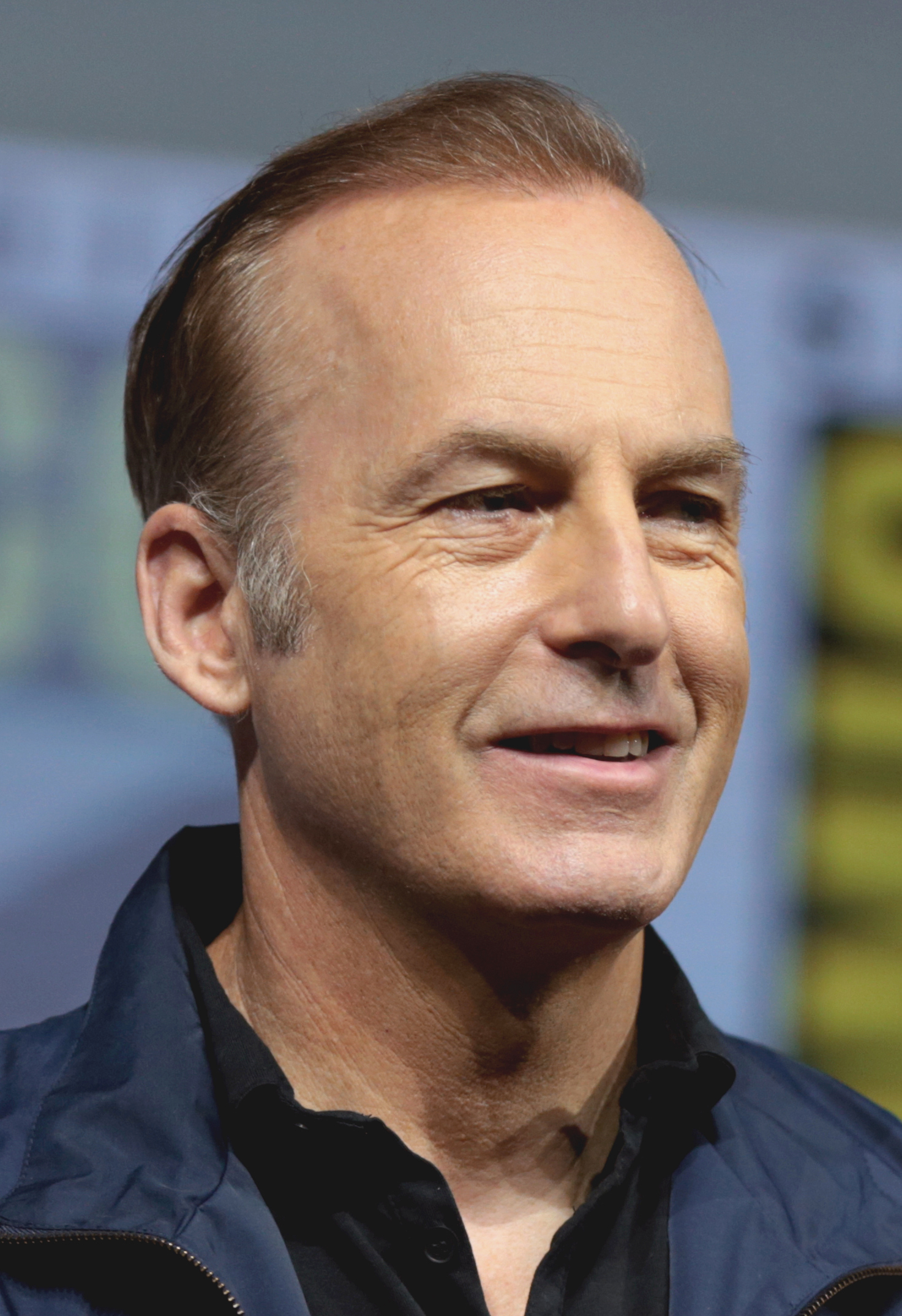
Bob Odenkirk, Best Actor in a Broadcast Network or Cable Series, Drama winner

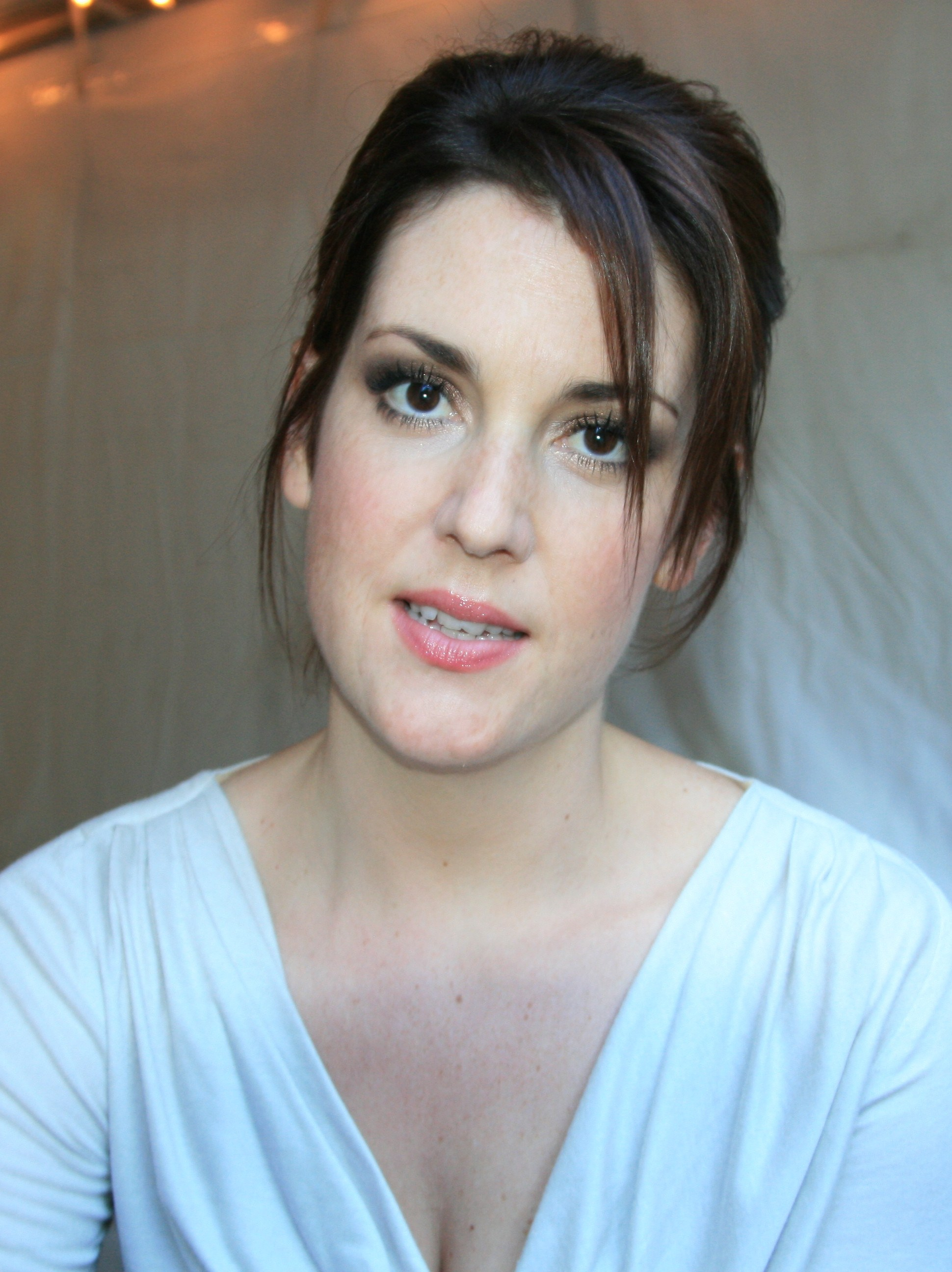
Melanie Lynskey, Best Actress in a Broadcast Network or Cable Series, Drama winner

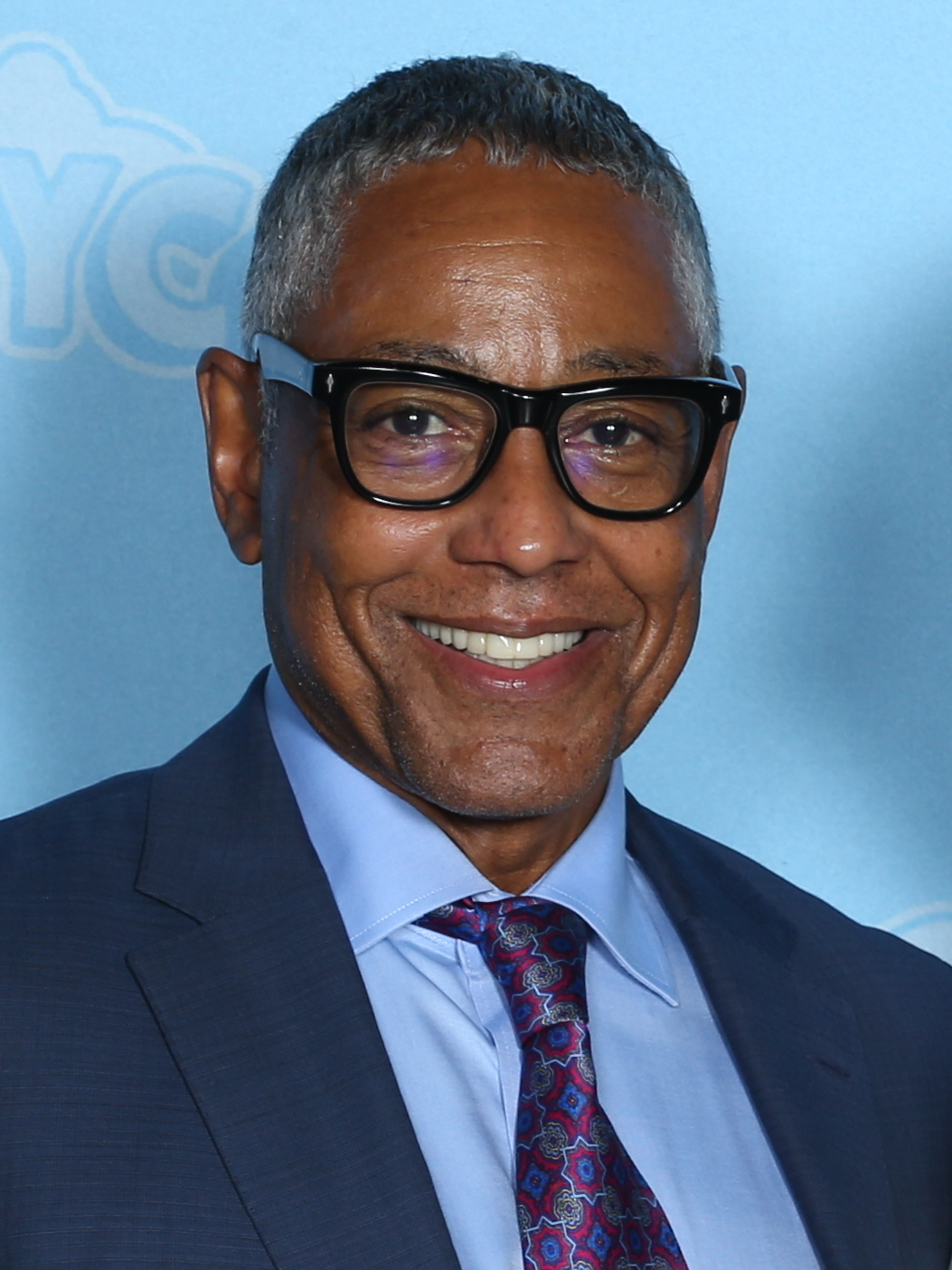
Giancarlo Esposito, Best Supporting Actor in a Broadcast Network or Cable Series, Drama winner

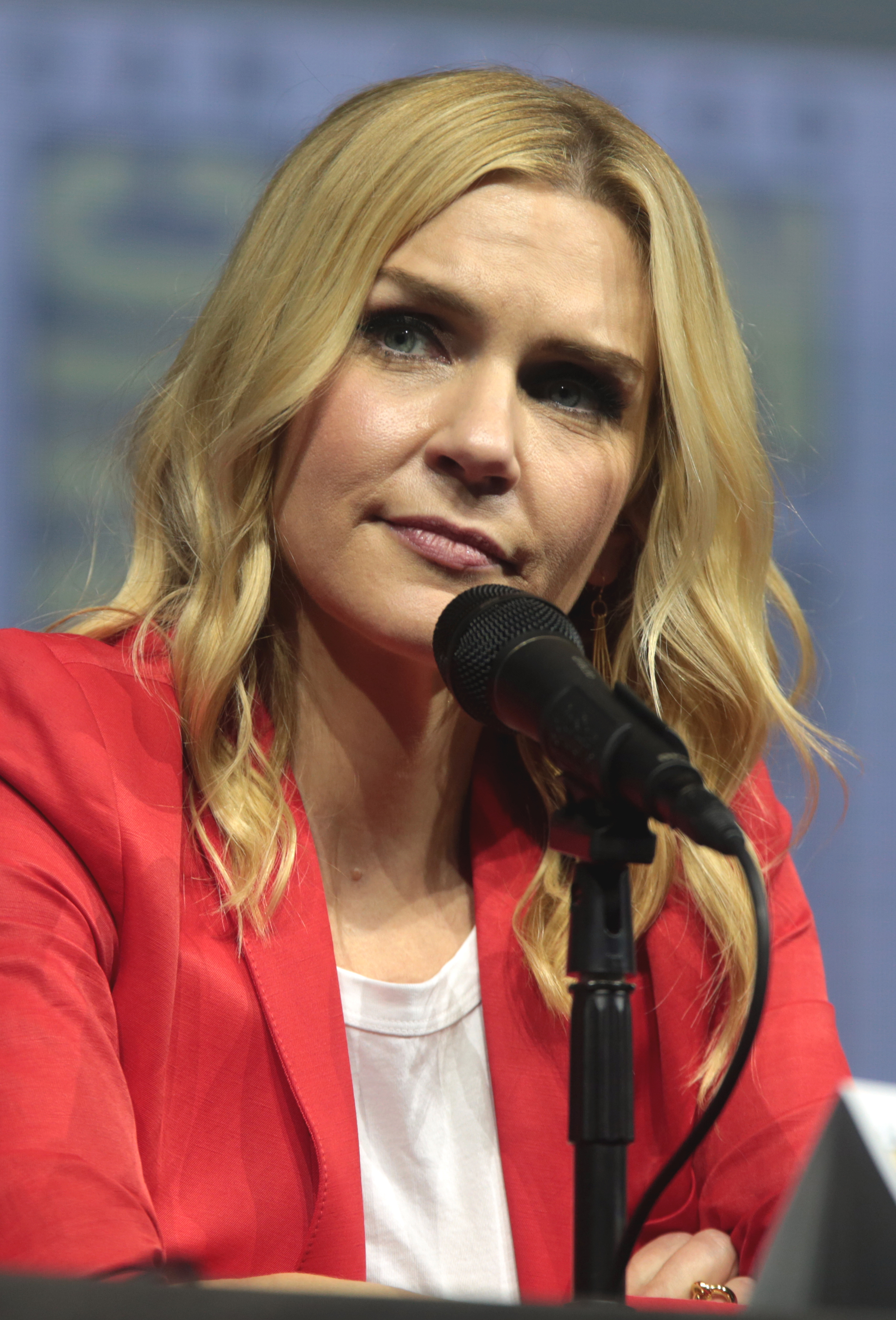
Rhea Seehorn, Best Supporting Actress in a Broadcast Network or Cable Series, Drama winner

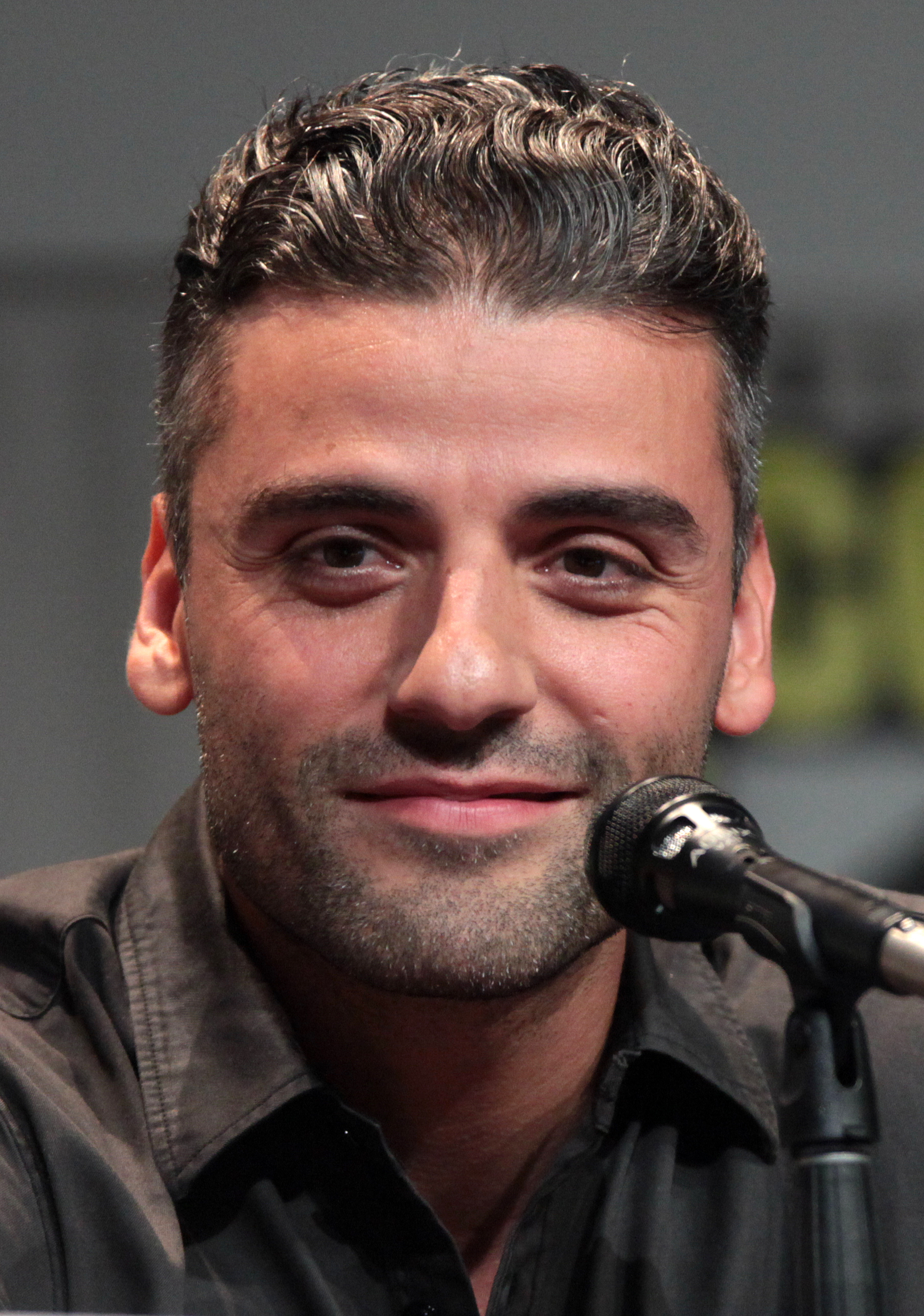
Oscar Isaac, Best Actor in a Broadcast Network or Cable Limited or Anthology Series winner

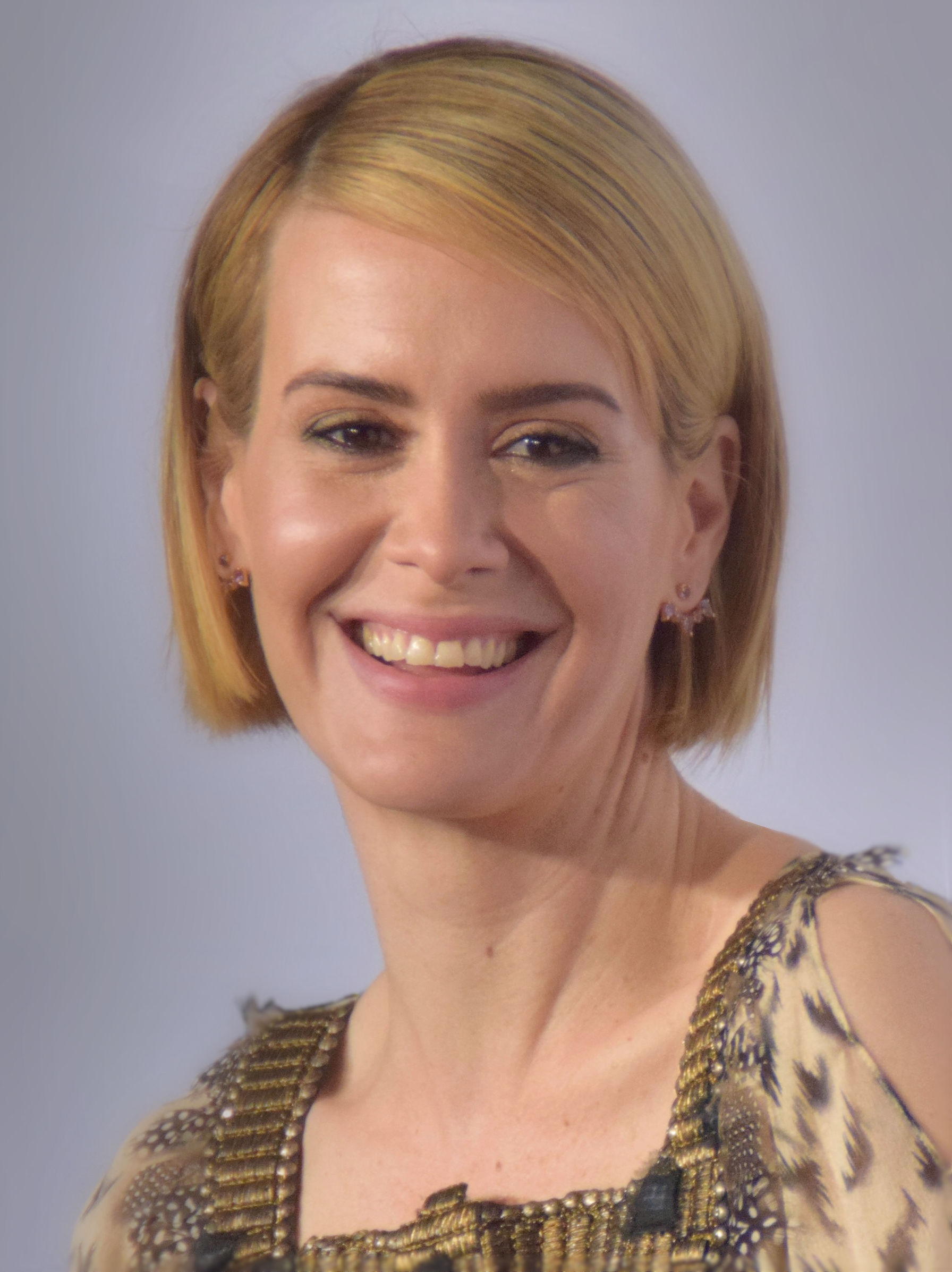
Sarah Paulson, Best Actress in a Broadcast Network or Cable Limited or Anthology Series winner

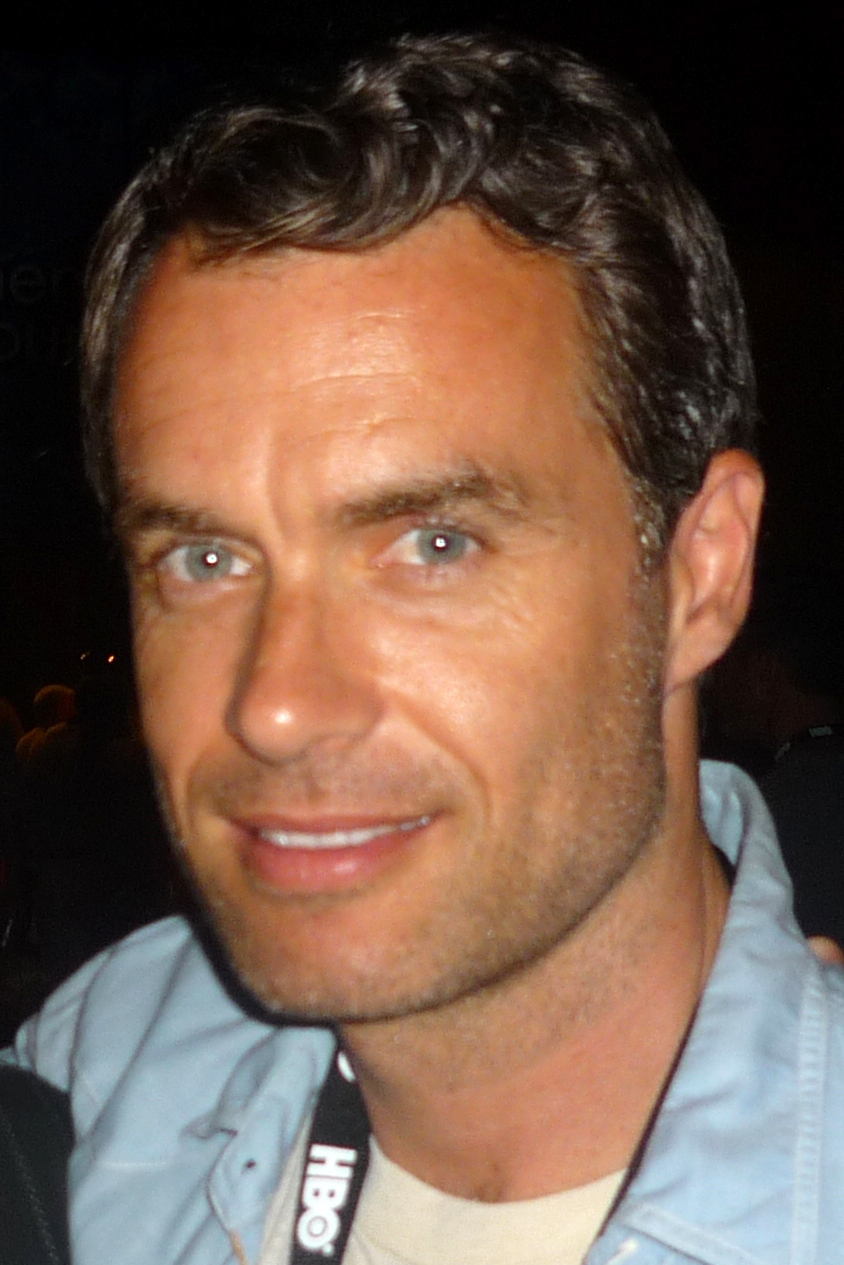
Murray Bartlett, Best Supporting Actor in a Broadcast Network or Cable Limited or Anthology Series winner

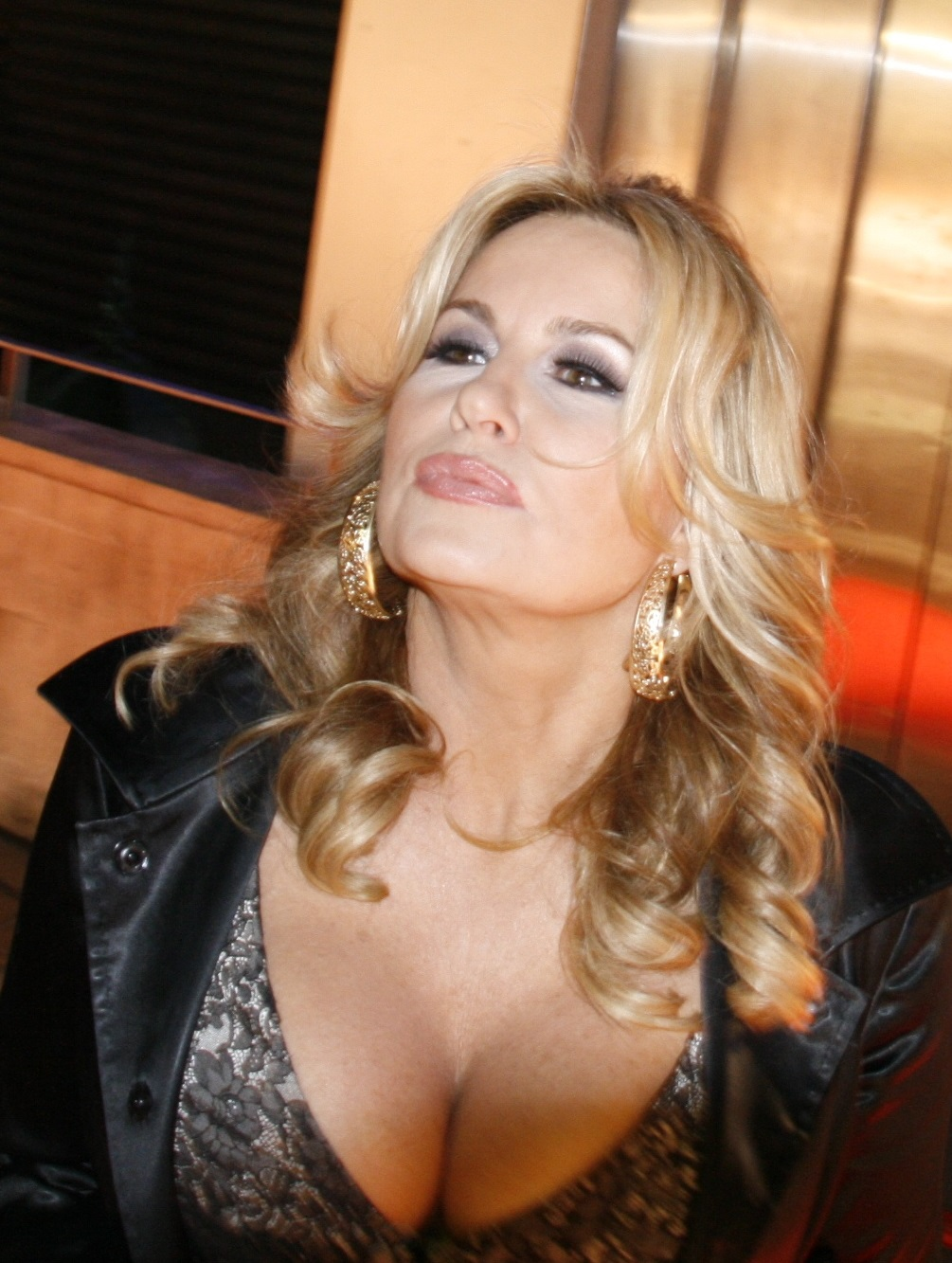
Jennifer Coolidge, Best Supporting Actress in a Broadcast Network or Cable Limited or Anthology Series winner

Winners are listed first and highlighted with boldface.

=== Programs ===
==== Streaming ====
**Best Streaming Series, Comedy**: **Ted Lasso (Apple TV+)**; Dickinson (Apple TV+); Hacks (HBO Max); Only Murders in the Building (Hulu); Reservation Dogs (FX on Hulu); Schmigadoon! (Apple TV+); The Afterparty (Apple TV+); The Marvelous Mrs. Maisel (Prime Video)	**Best Streaming Series, Drama**: **Severance (Apple TV+)**; Loki (Disney+); Ozark (Netflix); Pachinko (Apple TV+); Squid Game (Netflix); Star Trek: Strange New Worlds (Paramount+); Stranger Things (Netflix); The Morning Show (Apple TV+)
**Best Streaming Docuseries or Non-Fiction Series**: **The Beatles: Get Back (Disney+)**; Bad Vegan: Fame. Fraud. Fugitives. (Netflix); George Carlin's American Dream (HBO Max); Jeen-yuhs: A Kanye Trilogy (Netflix); LuLaRich (Prime Video); McCartney 3,2,1 (Hulu); Prehistoric Planet (Apple TV+); The Kids in the Hall: Comedy Punks (Prime Video); The World According to Jeff Goldblum (Disney+); What Happened, Brittany Murphy? (HBO Max)	**Best Streaming Documentary Television Movie**: **Lucy and Desi (Prime Video)**; Britney vs Spears (Netflix); Mary J. Blige's My Life (Prime Video); Olivia Rodrigo: driving home 2 u (Disney+); Our Father (Netflix); Spring Awakening: Those You've Known (HBO Max); The Tinder Swindler (Netflix); White Hot: The Rise & Fall of Abercrombie & Fitch (Netflix)
**Best Streaming Animated Series or Television Movie**: **Arcane (Netflix)**; Big Mouth (Netflix); Central Park (Apple TV+); Star Trek: Lower Decks (Paramount+); Undone (Prime Video); What If...? (Disney+)	**Best Streaming Reality Show or Competition Series**: **Lizzo's Watch Out for the Big Grrrls (Prime Video)**; Legendary (HBO Max); Queer Eye (Netflix); RuPaul's Drag Race All Stars (Paramount+); Selena + Chef (HBO Max); Snoop & Martha's Very Tasty Halloween (Peacock)
**Best Streaming Variety Sketch Series, Talk Series, or Special**: **The Kids in the Hall (Prime Video)**; Harry Potter 20th Anniversary: Return to Hogwarts (HBO Max); Murderville (Netflix); South Park: Post Covid (Paramount+); The Amber Ruffin Show (Peacock); The Problem with Jon Stewart (Apple TV+)	**Best Streaming Limited or Anthology Series**: **Dopesick (Hulu)**; Maid (Netflix); Midnight Mass (Netflix); Pam & Tommy (Hulu); Station Eleven (HBO Max); The Dropout (Hulu); The Staircase (HBO Max); Under the Banner of Heaven (FX on Hulu)
**Best Streaming Movie**: **Chip 'n Dale: Rescue Rangers (Disney+)**; Fresh (Hulu); I Want You Back (Prime Video); Kimi (HBO Max); The Fallout (HBO Max); Zoey's Extraordinary Christmas (Roku)

==== Broadcast Network / Cable ====
**Best Broadcast Network Series, Comedy**: **Abbott Elementary (ABC)**; American Auto (NBC); Black-ish (ABC); Brooklyn Nine-Nine (NBC); Ghosts (CBS); Mr. Mayor (NBC); The Wonder Years (ABC); Young Rock (NBC)	**Best Cable Series, Comedy**: **What We Do in the Shadows (FX)**; Atlanta (FX); Barry (HBO); Better Things (FX); Curb Your Enthusiasm (HBO); Resident Alien (Syfy); Somebody Somewhere (HBO); The Righteous Gemstones (HBO)
**Best Broadcast Network Series, Drama**: **This Is Us (NBC)**; 9-1-1: Lone Star (Fox); Grey's Anatomy (ABC); Kung Fu (The CW); Law & Order: Special Victims Unit (NBC); New Amsterdam (NBC); Superman & Lois (The CW); The Cleaning Lady (Fox)	**Best Cable Series, Drama**: **Better Call Saul (AMC)**; **Succession (HBO)**; Chucky (Syfy); Euphoria (HBO); Snowpiercer (TNT); The Gilded Age (HBO); Winning Time: The Rise of the Lakers Dynasty (HBO); Yellowjackets (Showtime)
**Best Broadcast Network or Cable Docuseries or Non-Fiction Series**: **We Need to Talk About Cosby (Showtime)**; 30 for 30 (ESPN); Janet Jackson (Lifetime); Shark Tank (ABC); The American Rescue Dog Show (ABC); The New York Times Presents: Controlling Britney Spears (FX)	**Best Broadcast or Cable Documentary TV Movie**: **End of the Line: The Women of Standing Rock (Fuse)**; Bitchin': The Sound and Fury of Rick James (Showtime); Black Patriots: Heroes of the Civil War (History); Dean Martin: King of Cool (TCM); Rise Again: Tulsa and the Red Summer (National Geographic); Sheryl (Showtime)
**Best Broadcast Network or Cable Sketch Series, Variety Series, Talk Show, or Comedy/Variety Special**: **A Black Lady Sketch Show (HBO)**; Jimmy Kimmel Live! (ABC); Last Week Tonight with John Oliver (HBO); Real Time with Bill Maher (HBO); Saturday Night Live (NBC); The Daily Show with Trevor Noah (Comedy Central)	**Best Broadcast Network or Cable Animated Series or Television Movie**: **Rick and Morty (Adult Swim)**; Archer (FX); Bob's Burgers (Fox); Family Guy (Fox); South Park (Comedy Central); Tuca & Bertie (Adult Swim)
**Best Broadcast Network Reality Show or Competition Series**: **Lego Masters (Fox)**; America's Got Talent (NBC); Holey Moley (ABC); Next Level Chef (Fox); The Masked Singer (Fox); The Voice (NBC)	**Best Cable Reality Show or Competition Series**: **RuPaul's Drag Race (VH1)**; Bar Rescue (Paramount Network); Harry Potter: Hogwarts Tournament of Houses (TBS); Project Runway (Bravo); Top Chef (Bravo); Wipeout (TBS)
**Best Broadcast Network or Cable Limited or Anthology Series**: **The White Lotus (HBO)**; Gaslit (Starz); Impeachment: American Crime Story (FX); Miracle Workers: Oregon Trail (TBS); Scenes from a Marriage (HBO); We Own This City (HBO)	**Best Broadcast Network or Cable Live-Action Television Movie**: **The Survivor (HBO)**; A Clüsterfünke Christmas (Comedy Central); List of a Lifetime (Lifetime); Ray Donovan: The Movie (Showtime); Reba McEntire's Christmas in Tune (Lifetime); Vandal (Fuse)

==== Miscellaneous ====
**Best International Series**: **Squid Game (Netflix)**; Acapulco (Apple TV+); Lupin (Netflix); Money Heist (Le Casa de Papel) (Netflix); Narcos: Mexico (Netflix); Pachinko (Apple TV+)	**Best Comedy or Standup Special**: **Norm Macdonald: Nothing Special (Netflix)**; Bo Burnham: The Inside Outtakes (YouTube); Jerrod Carmichael: Rothaniel (HBO); Jim Gaffigan: Comedy Monster (Netflix); Ricky Gervais: SuperNature (Netflix); Tig Notaro: Drawn (HBO)
**Best Game Show**: **Celebrity Family Feud (ABC)**; Jeopardy! National College Championship (ABC); Name That Tune (Fox); Supermarket Sweep (ABC); The Chase (ABC); To Tell the Truth (ABC)	**Best Short Form Live-Action Series**: **I Think You Should Leave with Tim Robinson (Netflix)**; Betsy & Irv (ESPN); Carpool Karaoke: The Series (Apple TV+); Cooper's Bar (AMC); Mamas (Roku); State of the Union (Sundance TV)
**Best Short Form Animation Series**: **Love, Death & Robots (Netflix)**; Olaf Presents (Disney+); Smiling Friends (Adult Swim); Ted Lasso Presents: The Missing Christmas Mustache (Apple TV+); The Boys Presents: Diabolical (Prime Video); The Wheel of Time: Origins (Prime Video)

=== Acting ===
==== Streaming ====
**Best Actor in a Streaming Series, Comedy**: **Martin Short – Only Murders in the Building as Oliver Putnam (Hulu)**; Jason Sudeikis – Ted Lasso as Ted Lasso (Apple TV+); John Cena – Peacemaker as Christopher Smith / Peacemaker (HBO Max); Keegan-Michael Key – Schmigadoon! as Josh Skinner (Apple TV+); Nicholas Hoult – The Great as Peter III of Russia (Hulu); Rhys Darby – Our Flag Means Death as Stede Bonnet (HBO Max); Sam Richardson – The Afterparty as Aniq (Apple TV+); Steve Martin – Only Murders in the Building as Charles-Haden Savage (Hulu)	**Best Actress in a Streaming Series, Comedy**: **Selena Gomez – Only Murders in the Building as Mabel Mora (Hulu)**; Elle Fanning – The Great as Catherine the Great (Hulu); Hailee Steinfeld – Hawkeye as Kate Bishop / Hawkeye (Disney+); Jean Smart – Hacks as Deborah Vance (HBO Max); Kaley Cuoco – The Flight Attendant as Cassie Bowden (HBO Max); Kat Dennings – Dollface as Jules Wiley (Hulu); Rachel Brosnahan – The Marvelous Mrs. Maisel as Miriam "Midge" Maisel (Prime Video); Tiffany Haddish – The Afterparty as Detective Danner (Apple TV+)
**Best Supporting Actor in a Streaming Series, Comedy**: **Brett Goldstein – Ted Lasso as Roy Kent (Apple TV+)**; Ben Schwartz – The Afterparty as Yasper (Apple TV+); Nathan Lane – Only Murders in the Building as Teddy Dimas (Hulu); Nick Mohammed –Ted Lasso as Nathan Shelley (Apple TV+); Paul W. Downs – Hacks as Jimmy LuSaque (HBO Max); Taika Waititi – Our Flag Means Death as Ed Teach / Blackbeard (HBO Max); Toheeb Jimoh – Ted Lasso as Sam Obisanya (Apple TV+); Tony Shalhoub – The Marvelous Mrs. Maisel as Abe Weissman (Prime Video)	**Best Supporting Actress in a Streaming Series, Comedy**: **Hannah Einbinder – Hacks as Ava Daniels (HBO Max)**; Alex Borstein – The Marvelous Mrs. Maisel as Susie Myerson (Prime Video); Amy Ryan – Only Murders in the Building as Jan Bellows (Hulu); Ariana DeBose – Schmigadoon! as Emma Tate (Apple TV+); Florence Pugh – Hawkeye as Yelena Belova / Black Widow (Disney+); Hannah Waddingham – Ted Lasso as Rebecca Welton (Apple TV+); Juno Temple – Ted Lasso as Keeley Jones (Apple TV+); Kristin Chenoweth – Schmigadoon! as Mildred Layton (Apple TV+)
**Best Actor in a Streaming Series, Drama**: **Lee Jung-jae – Squid Game as Seong Gi-hun (Netflix)**; Adam Scott – Severance as Mark Scout (Apple TV+); Gary Oldman – Slow Horses as Jackson Lamb (Apple TV+); Henry Cavill – The Witcher as Geralt of Rivia (Netflix); Jason Bateman – Ozark as Marty Byrde (Netflix); Penn Badgley – You as Joe Goldberg (Netflix); Tom Ellis – Lucifer as Lucifer Morningstar (Netflix); Tom Hiddleston – Loki as Loki (Disney+)	**Best Actress in a Streaming Series, Drama**: **Britt Lower – Severance as Helly Riggs (Apple TV+)**; **Laura Linney – Ozark as Wendy Byrde (Netflix)**; Jennifer Aniston – The Morning Show as Alex Levy (Apple TV+); Ming-Na Wen – The Book of Boba Fett as Fennec Shand (Disney+); Reese Witherspoon – The Morning Show as Bradley Jackson (Apple TV+); Simone Ashley – Bridgerton as Kate, Viscountess Bridgerton (Netflix); Victoria Pedretti – You as Love Quinn (Netflix); Winona Ryder – Stranger Things as Joyce Byers (Netflix)
**Best Supporting Actor in a Streaming Series, Drama**: **John Turturro – Severance as Irving Bailiff (Apple TV+)**; Billy Crudup – The Morning Show as Cory Ellison (Apple TV+); Christopher Walken – Severance as Burt Goodman (Apple TV+); Joe Keery – Stranger Things as Steve Harrington (Netflix); Owen Wilson – Loki as Mobius M. Mobius (Disney+); Park Hae-soo – Squid Game as Cho Sang-woo (Netflix); Tramell Tillman – Severance as Seth Milchick (Apple TV+); Zach Cherry – Severance as Dylan George (Apple TV+)	**Best Supporting Actress in a Streaming Series, Drama**: **Sadie Sink – Stranger Things as Max Mayfield (Netflix)**; Dichen Lachman – Severance as Ms. Casey (Apple TV+); Julia Garner – Ozark as Ruth Langmore (Netflix); Jung Ho-yeon – Squid Game as Kang Sae-byeok (Netflix); Maya Hawke – Stranger Things as Robin Buckley (Netflix); Millie Bobby Brown – Stranger Things as Eleven / Jane Hopper (Netflix); Patricia Arquette – Severance as Harmony Cobel / Mrs. Selvig (Apple TV+); Sophia Di Martino – Loki as Sylvie (Disney+)
**Best Actor in a Streaming Limited or Anthology Series or Movie**: **Michael Keaton – Dopesick as Dr. Samuel Finnix (Hulu)**; Andrew Garfield – Under the Banner of Heaven as Detective Jeb Pyre (FX on Hulu); Colin Firth – The Staircase as Michael Peterson (HBO Max); Hamish Linklater – Midnight Mass as Father Paul Hill (Netflix); Oscar Isaac – Moon Knight as Marc Spector / Moon Knight & Steven Grant / Mr. Knight & Jake Lockley (Disney+); Samuel L. Jackson – The Last Days of Ptolemy Grey as Ptolemy Grey (Apple TV+); Sebastian Stan – Fresh as Steve / Brendan (Hulu); Sebastian Stan – Pam & Tommy as Tommy Lee (Hulu)	**Best Actress in a Streaming Limited or Anthology Series or Movie**: **Amanda Seyfried – The Dropout as Elizabeth Holmes (Hulu)**; Anne Hathaway – WeCrashed as Rebekah Neumann (Apple TV+); Daisy Edgar-Jones – Fresh as Noa (Hulu); Elle Fanning – The Girl from Plainville as Michelle Carter (Hulu); Jessica Biel – Candy as Candy Montgomery (Hulu); Lily James – Pam & Tommy as Pamela Anderson (Hulu); Margaret Qualley – Maid as Alexandra "Alex" Russell (Netflix); Toni Collette – The Staircase as Kathleen Peterson (HBO Max)
**Best Supporting Actor in a Streaming Limited or Anthology Series or Movie**: **Seth Rogen – Pam & Tommy as Rand Gauthier (Hulu)**; Ethan Hawke – Moon Knight as Arthur Harrow (Disney+); Matthew Goode – The Offer as Robert Evans (Paramount+); Michael Stuhlbarg – Dopesick as Richard Sackler (Hulu); Naveen Andrews – The Dropout as Sunny Balwani (Hulu); Peter Sarsgaard – Dopesick as Rick Mountcastle (Hulu); Will Poulter – Dopesick as Billy Cutler (Hulu); Wyatt Russell – Under the Banner of Heaven as Dan Lafferty (FX on Hulu)	**Best Supporting Actress in a Streaming Limited or Anthology Series or Movie**: **Kaitlyn Dever – Dopesick as Betsy Mallum (Hulu)**; Andie MacDowell – Maid as Paula Langley (Netflix); Chloë Sevigny – The Girl from Plainville as Lynn Roy (Hulu); Daisy Edgar-Jones – Under the Banner of Heaven as Brenda Lafferty (FX on Hulu); Juno Temple – The Offer as Bettye McCartt (Paramount+); Laurie Metcalf – The Dropout as Phyllis Gardner (Hulu); Melanie Lynskey – Candy as Betty Gore (Hulu); Rosario Dawson – Dopesick as Bridget Meyer (Hulu)

==== Broadcast Network / Cable ====
**Best Actor in a Broadcast Network or Cable Series, Comedy**: **Bill Hader – Barry as Barry Berkman / Barry Block (HBO)**; Andy Samberg – Brooklyn Nine-Nine as Det. Jake Peralta (NBC); Anthony Anderson – Black-ish as Dre Johnson Sr. (ABC); Donald Glover – Atlanta as Earnest "Earn" Marks (FX); Kayvan Novak – What We Do in the Shadows as Nandor the Relentless (FX); Larry David – Curb Your Enthusiasm as Himself (HBO); Matt Berry – What We Do in the Shadows as Laszlo Cravensworth (FX); Utkarsh Ambudkar – Ghosts as Jay Arondekar (CBS)	**Best Actress in a Broadcast Network or Cable Series, Comedy**: **Quinta Brunson – Abbott Elementary as Janine Teagues (ABC)**; Bridget Everett – Somebody Somewhere as Sam (HBO); Issa Rae – Insecure as Issa Dee (HBO); Jasmine Cephas Jones – Blindspotting as Ashley Rose (Starz); Natasia Demetriou – What We Do in the Shadows as Nadja of Antipaxos (FX); Pamela Adlon – Better Things as Sam Fox (FX); Rose McIver – Ghosts as Samantha Arondekar (CBS); Tracee Ellis Ross – Black-ish as Dr. Rainbow "Bow" Johnson (ABC)
**Best Supporting Actor in a Broadcast Network or Cable Series, Comedy**: **Henry Winkler – Barry as Gene Cousineau (HBO)**; Anthony Carrigan – Barry as NoHo Hank (HBO); Bowen Yang – Saturday Night Live as Various Characters (NBC); Brandon Scott Jones – Ghosts as Captain Isaac Higgintoot (CBS); Brian Tyree Henry – Atlanta as Alfred "Paper Boi" Miles (FX); Chris Perfetti – Abbott Elementary as Jacob Hill (ABC); Harvey Guillén – What We Do in the Shadows as Guillermo de la Cruz (FX); Tyler James Williams – Abbott Elementary as Gregory Eddie (ABC)	**Best Supporting Actress in a Broadcast Network or Cable Series, Comedy**: **Janelle James – Abbott Elementary as Ava Coleman (ABC)**; D'Arcy Carden – Barry as Natalie Greer (HBO); Danielle Pinnock – Ghosts as Alberta Haynes (CBS); Kristen Schaal – What We Do in the Shadows as The Guide (FX); Sarah Goldberg – Barry as Sally Reed (HBO); Sheryl Lee Ralph – Abbott Elementary as Barbara Howard (ABC); Stephanie Beatriz – Brooklyn Nine-Nine as Rosa Diaz (NBC); Zazie Beetz – Atlanta as Van Keefer (FX)
**Best Actor in a Broadcast Network or Cable Series, Drama**: **Bob Odenkirk – Better Call Saul as Jimmy McGill / Saul Goodman / Gene Takavic (AMC)**; Brian Cox – Succession as Logan Roy (HBO); Daveed Diggs – Snowpiercer as Andre Layton (TNT); Harold Perrineau – From as Boyd Stevens (eᴘix); Jeremy Strong – Succession as Kendall Roy (HBO); Kevin Costner – Yellowstone as John Dutton (Paramount Network); Milo Ventimiglia – This Is Us as Jack Pearson (NBC); Sterling K. Brown – This Is Us as Randall Pearson (NBC)	**Best Actress in a Broadcast Network or Cable Series, Drama**: **Melanie Lynskey – Yellowjackets as Shauna (Showtime)**; Freema Agyeman – New Amsterdam as Dr. Helen Sharpe (NBC); Jodie Comer – Killing Eve as Oksana Astankova / Villanelle (BBC America); Juliette Lewis – Yellowjackets as Natalie (Showtime); Kelly Reilly – Yellowstone as Beth Dutton (Paramount Network); Mandy Moore – This Is Us as Rebecca Pearson (NBC); Sandra Oh – Killing Eve as Eve Polastri (BBC America); Zendaya – Euphoria as Rue Bennett (HBO)
**Best Supporting Actor in a Broadcast Network or Cable Series, Drama**: **Giancarlo Esposito – Better Call Saul as Gus Fring (AMC)**; Eric Dane – Euphoria as Cal Jacobs (HBO); Jonathan Banks – Better Call Saul as Mike Ehrmantraut (AMC); Jon Huertas – This Is Us as Miguel Rivas (NBC); Justin Hartley – This Is Us as Kevin Pearson (NBC); Kieran Culkin – Succession as Roman Roy (HBO); Matthew Macfadyen – Succession as Tom Wambsgans (HBO); Michael Mando – Better Call Saul as Nacho Varga (AMC)	**Best Supporting Actress in a Broadcast Network or Cable Series, Drama**: **Rhea Seehorn – Better Call Saul as Kim Wexler (AMC)**; Chrissy Metz – This Is Us as Kate Pearson (NBC); Christina Ricci – Yellowjackets as Misty (Showtime); J. Smith-Cameron – Succession as Gerri Kellman (HBO); Sandra Mae Frank – New Amsterdam as Dr. Elizabeth Wilder (NBC); Sarah Snook – Succession as Shiv Roy (HBO); Susan Kelechi Watson – This Is Us as Beth (Clarke) Pearson (NBC); Sydney Sweeney – Euphoria as Cassie Howard (HBO)
**Best Actor in a Broadcast Network or Cable Limited or Anthology Series**: **Oscar Isaac – Scenes from a Marriage as Jonathan Levy (HBO)**; Ben Foster – The Survivor as Harry Haft (HBO); Bill Pullman – The Sinner as Harry Ambrose (USA Network); Daniel Radcliffe – Miracle Workers: Oregon Trail as Reverend Ezekiel Brown (TBS); Jon Bernthal – We Own This City as Sgt. Wayne Jenkins (HBO); Sean Penn – Gaslit as John N. Mitchell (Starz)	**Best Actress in a Broadcast Network or Cable Limited or Anthology Series**: **Sarah Paulson – American Crime Story: Impeachment as Linda Tripp (FX)**; Geraldine Viswanathan – Miracle Workers: Oregon Trail as Prudence Aberdeen (TBS); Jessica Chastain – Scenes from a Marriage as Mira Phillips (HBO); Julia Roberts – Gaslit as Martha Mitchell (Starz); Michelle Pfeiffer – The First Lady as Betty Ford (Showtime); Renée Zellweger – The Thing About Pam as Pam Hupp (NBC)
**Best Supporting Actor in a Broadcast Network or Cable Limited or Anthology Series**: **Murray Bartlett – The White Lotus as Armond (HBO)**; Dan Stevens – Gaslit as John Dean (Starz); Josh Charles – We Own This City as Daniel Hersl (HBO); Josh Duhamel – The Thing About Pam as Joel Schwartz (NBC); Steve Buscemi – Miracle Workers: Oregon Trail as Benny the Teen (TBS); Steve Zahn – The White Lotus as Mark Mossbacher (HBO)	**Best Supporting Actress in a Broadcast Network or Cable Limited or Anthology Series**: **Jennifer Coolidge – The White Lotus as Tanya McQuoid (HBO)**; Alexandra Daddario – The White Lotus as Rachel Patton (HBO); Betty Gilpin – Gaslit as Mo Dean (Starz); Connie Britton – The White Lotus as Nicole Mossbacher (HBO); Judy Greer – The Thing About Pam as Leah Askey (NBC); Sydney Sweeney – The White Lotus as Olivia Mossbacher (HBO)

=== Directing ===
==== Streaming ====
**Best Directing in a Streaming Series, Comedy**: **Lucia Aniello – Hacks: "There Will Be Blood" (HBO Max)**; Cherien Dabis – Only Murders in the Building: "The Boy from 6B" (Hulu); Christopher Miller – The Afterparty: "Yasper" (Apple TV+); Declan Lowney – Ted Lasso: "Inverting the Pyramid of Success" (Apple TV+); Jamie Babbit – Only Murders in the Building: "True Crime" (Hulu); MJ Delaney – Ted Lasso: "No Weddings and a Funeral" (Apple TV+); Sterlin Harjo – Reservation Dogs: "Hunting" (FX on Hulu); Taika Waititi – Our Flag Means Death: "Pilot" (HBO Max)	**Best Directing in a Streaming Series, Drama**: **Ben Stiller – Severance: "The We We Are" (Apple TV+)**; Aoife McArdle – Severance: "The You You Are" (Apple TV+); Hwang Dong-hyuk – Squid Game: "Red Light, Green Light" (Netflix); Jason Bateman – Ozark: "A Hard Way to Go" (Netflix); Kate Herron – Loki: "Journey into Mystery" (Disney+); M. Night Shyamalan – Servant: "Donkey" (Apple TV+); Shawn Levy – Stranger Things: "Chapter Four: Dear Billy" (Netflix); The Duffer Brothers – Stranger Things: "Chapter Seven: The Massacre at Hawkins Lab" (Netflix)
**Best Directing in a Streaming Limited or Anthology Series or Movie**: **Lake Bell – Pam & Tommy: "The Master Beta" (Hulu)**; Craig Gillespie – Pam & Tommy: "I Love You, Tommy" (Hulu); Danny Strong – Dopesick: "The People vs. Purdue Pharma" (Hulu); Hiro Murai – Station Eleven: "Wheel of Fire" (HBO Max); Isabel Sandoval – Under the Banner of Heaven: "Revelation" (FX on Hulu); Liz Hannah – The Girl from Plainville: "Talking Is Healing" (Hulu); Michael Showalter – The Dropout: "Green Juice" (Hulu); Mimi Cave – Fresh (Hulu)

==== Broadcast Network / Cable ====
**Best Directing in a Broadcast Network or Cable Series, Comedy**: **Bill Hader – Barry: "710N" (HBO)**; Danny McBride – The Righteous Gemstones: "As to How They Might Destroy Him" (HBO); Hiro Murai – Atlanta: "New Jazz" (FX); Iona Morris Jackson – Black-ish: "If a Black Man Cries in the Woods" (ABC); Jay Duplass – Somebody Somewhere: "Tee-Tee Pa-Pah" (HBO); Pamela Adlon – Better Things: "We Are Not Alone" (FX); Randall Einhorn – Abbott Elementary: "Pilot" (ABC); Yana Gorskaya – What We Do in the Shadows: "The Wellness Center" (FX)	**Best Directing in a Broadcast Network or Cable Series, Drama**: **Karyn Kusama – Yellowjackets: "Pilot" (Showtime)**; Cathy Yan – Succession: "The Disruption" (HBO); Jon Huertas – This Is Us: "Four Fathers" (NBC); Lorene Scafaria – Succession: "Too Much Birthday" (HBO); Mark Mylod – Succession: "All the Bells Say" (HBO); Milo Ventimiglia – This Is Us: "Guitar Man" (NBC); Sam Levinson – Euphoria: "Stand Still Like the Hummingbird" (HBO); Taylor Sheridan – Yellowstone: "Keep the Wolves Close" (Paramount Network)
**Best Directing in a Broadcast Network or Cable Limited or Anthology Series**: **Mike White – The White Lotus: "Mysterious Monkeys" (HBO)**; Barry Levinson – The Survivor (HBO); Gina Prince-Bythewood – Women of the Movement: "Mother and Son" (ABC); Hagai Levi – Scenes from a Marriage: "The Illiterates" (HBO); Ryan Murphy – American Crime Story: Impeachment: "Man Handled" (FX); Steve Buscemi – Miracle Workers: Oregon Trail: "Over the Mountain" (TBS)

=== Writing ===
==== Streaming ====
**Best Writing in a Streaming Series, Comedy**: **Lucia Aniello, Paul W. Downs, and Jen Statsky – Hacks: "The One, The Only" (HBO Max)**; Bill Wrubel – Ted Lasso: "Rainbow" (Apple TV+); Christopher Miller – The Afterparty: "Maggie" (Apple TV+); Cinco Paul and Ken Daurio – Schmigadoon!: "Schmigadoon!" (Apple TV+); James Gunn – Peacemaker: "It's Cow or Never" (HBO Max); Jane Becker – Ted Lasso: "No Weddings and a Funeral" (Apple TV+); Sterlin Harjo and Taika Waititi – Reservation Dogs: "F*ckin' Rez Dogs" (FX on Hulu); Steve Martin and John Hoffman – Only Murders in the Building: "True Crime" (Hulu)	**Best Writing in a Streaming Series, Drama**: **Dan Erickson – Severance: "The We We Are" (Apple TV+)**; Chris Mundy – Ozark: "A Hard Way to Go" (Netflix); David E. Kelley – Nine Perfect Strangers: "Ever After" (Hulu); Hwang Dong-hyuk – Squid Game: "One Lucky Day" (Netflix); Kerry Ehrin and Scott Troy – The Morning Show: "La Amara Vita" (Apple TV+); Michael Waldron – Loki: "Glorious Purpose" (Disney+); Soo Hugh – Pachinko: "Chapter One" (Apple TV+); The Duffer brothers – Stranger Things: "Chapter Seven: The Massacre at Hawkins Lab" (Netflix)
**Best Writing in a Streaming Limited or Anthology Series or Movie**: **Danny Strong – Dopesick: "The People vs. Purdue Pharma" (Hulu)**; Antonio Campos – The Staircase: "911" (HBO Max); Dustin Lance Black – Under the Banner of Heaven: "When God Was Love" (FX on Hulu); Elizabeth Meriwether – The Dropout: "I'm In A Hurry" (Hulu); Jeremy Slater – Moon Knight: "The Goldfish Problem" (Disney+); Lauryn Kahn – Fresh (Hulu); Liz Hannah and Patrick MacManus – The Girl from Plainville: "Star-Crossed Lovers and Things Like That" (Hulu); Patrick Somerville – Station Eleven: "Unbroken Circle" (HBO Max)

==== Broadcast Network / Cable ====
**Best Writing in a Broadcast Network or Cable Series, Comedy**: **Quinta Brunson – Abbott Elementary: "Pilot" (ABC)**; Albertina Rizzo – American Auto: "Commercial" (NBC); Alec Berg and Bill Hader – Barry: "starting now" (HBO); Donald Glover – Atlanta: "Rich Wigga, Poor Wigga" (FX); Issa Rae – Insecure: "Everything Gonna Be, Okay?!" (HBO); John Carcieri, Danny McBride, and Edi Patterson – The Righteous Gemstones: "As to How They Might Destroy Him" (HBO); Liz Sarnoff – Barry: "candy asses" (HBO); Stefani Robinson – What We Do in the Shadows: "The Wellness Center" (FX)	**Best Writing in a Broadcast Network or Cable Series, Drama**: **Dan Fogelman – This Is Us: "The Train" (NBC)**; Ashley Lyle and Bart Nickerson – Yellowjackets: "Pilot" (Showtime); Casey Johnson, David Windsor, and Chrissy Metz – This Is Us: "The Hill" (NBC); Clyde Phillips, Alexandra Franklin, and Marc Muszynski – Dexter: New Blood: "Sins of the Father" (Showtime); Jesse Armstrong – Succession: "All the Bells Say" (HBO); Julian Fellowes – The Gilded Age: "Face the Music" (HBO); Sam Levinson – Euphoria: "Stand Still Like the Hummingbird" (HBO); Taylor Sheridan – Yellowstone: "Half the Money" (Paramount Network)
**Best Writing in a Broadcast Network or Cable Limited or Anthology Series**: **Mike White – The White Lotus: "Mysterious Monkeys" (HBO)**; Aaron Cooley, Cathy Schulman, Ellen Fairey, and Abby Ajayi – The First Lady: "Voices Carry" (Showtime); George Pelecanos and David Simon – We Own This City: "Part One" (HBO); Hagai Levi – Scenes from a Marriage: "The Illiterates" (HBO); Sarah Burgess – Impeachment: American Crime Story: "Man Handled" (FX); Taylor Cox – Miracle Workers: Oregon Trail: "What Happens in Branchwater" (TBS)

== Honorary Awards ==
- Virtuoso Award – Mandy Moore
- Spotlight Award – As We See It
- TV Icon Award – Giancarlo Esposito
- TV Breakout Star Award – Quinta Brunson
- Legacy Award – Star Trek: Strange New Worlds

== Most wins ==
Wins by series
Wins	Series
5	Severance
5	The White Lotus
4	Abbott Elementary
4	Better Call Saul
4	Dopesick
3	Barry
3	Hacks
2	Only Murders in the Building
2	Pam & Tommy
2	Squid Game
2	Ted Lasso
2	This Is Us
2	Yellowjackets

Wins by network/platform
Wins	Network/Platform
12	HBO
9	Hulu
8	Netflix
7	Apple TV+
5	ABC
4	AMC
3	HBO Max
3	Prime Video
3	Showtime
2	Disney+
2	FX
2	NBC

== Most nominations ==
Nominations by series
Nominations	Series
12	Severance
12	This Is Us
11	Succession
11	Ted Lasso
9	Barry
9	Dopesick
9	Only Murders in the Building
9	Stranger Things
9	The White Lotus
8	Abbott Elementary
8	What We Do in the Shadows
7	Squid Game
6	The Afterparty
6	Atlanta
6	Better Call Saul
6	The Dropout
6	Euphoria
6	Hacks
6	Loki
6	Miracle Workers: Oregon Trail
6	Ozark
6	Pam & Tommy
6	Under the Banner of Heaven
6	Yellowjackets
5	Fresh
5	Gaslit
5	Ghosts
5	The Morning Show
5	Scenes from a Marriage
5	Schmigadoon!
4	Black-ish
4	The Girl from Plainville
4	Impeachment: American Crime Story
4	The Marvelous Mrs. Maisel
4	The Stairacse
4	We Own This City
4	Yellowstone
3	Better Things
3	Brooklyn Nine-Nine
3	Maid
3	Moon Knight
3	New Amsterdam
3	Our Flag Means Death
3	Pachinko
3	Peacemaker
3	Reservation Dogs
3	The Righteous Gemstones
3	Somebody Somehere
3	Station Eleven
3	The Survivor
3	The Thing About Pam
2	American Auto
2	Candy
2	Curb Your Enthusiasm
2	The First Lady
2	The Gilded Age
2	The Great
2	Hawkeye
2	Insecure
2	Killing Eve
2	Midnight Mass
2	The Offer
2	Saturday Night Live
2	Snowpiercer
2	You

Nominations by network/platform
Nominations	Network/Platform
65	HBO
52	Apple TV+
50	Netflix
46	Hulu
30	NBC
27	HBO Max
24	ABC
23	FX
19	Disney+
14	Prime Video
13	Showtime
9	FX on Hulu
8	Fox
8	TBS
7	AMC
6	Paramount+
6	Starz
5	CBS
5	Paramount Network
3	Adult Swim
3	Comedy Central
3	Lifetime
2	BBC America
2	Bravo
2	The CW
2	ESPN
2	Fuse
2	Peacock
2	Roku
2	Syfy
2	TNT

== See also ==
- 6th Hollywood Critics Association Film Awards
- 5th Hollywood Critics Association Midseason Film Awards
- 1st Hollywood Critics Association Creative Arts Film Awards
