= After I Leave, Savage Wolves Will Come =

- The Righteous Gemstones episode
- Episode no.: Season 2 Episode 2
- Directed by: Jody Hill
- Written by: Danny McBride; John Carcieri; Jeff Fradley
- Cinematography by: Michael Simmonds; Paul Daley
- Editing by: Todd Zelin
- Original air date: January 9, 2022
- Running time: 33 minutes

Guest appearances
- Jason Schwartzman as Thaniel Block; Eric Roberts as Glendon "Junior" Marsh Jr.; Eric André as Lyle Lissons; Jessica Lowe as Lindy Lissons; Joe Jonas as Himself; Chloe Bridges as Meagan; James DuMont as Chad; Kelton DuMont as Pontius Gemstone; Jody Hill as Levi; Troy Anthony Hogan as Matthew; Mary Hollis Inboden as Mandy; J. LaRose as Gregory; Gavin Munn as Abraham Gemstone

Episode chronology
← Previous "I Speak in the Tongues of Men and Angels"	Next → "For He Is a Liar and the Father of Lies"

"After I Leave, Savage Wolves Will Come" is the second episode of the second season of the American dark comedy crime television series The Righteous Gemstones. It is the eleventh overall episode of the series and was written by series creator Danny McBride, executive producer John Carcieri and executive producer Jeff Fradley, and directed by executive producer Jody Hill. It was released on HBO on January 9, 2022, airing back-to-back with the previous episode, "I Speak in the Tongues of Men and Angels".

The series follows a family of televangelists and megachurch pastors led by widowed patriarch Eli Gemstone. The main focus is Eli and his immature children, Jesse, Kelvin and Judy, all of whom face challenges in their lives. The series premiere introduced a long-running arc where Jesse is blackmailed for an incriminating video, which was revealed to be part of a scheme orchestrated by his estranged son, Gideon. In the episode, a reporter named Thaniel Block investigates the Gemstones, just as Jesse discovers a disadvantage of his deal with Zion's Landing.

According to Nielsen Media Research, the episode was seen by an estimated 0.190 million household viewers and gained a 0.1 ratings share among adults aged 18–49. The episode received mostly positive reviews from critics, who praised the new mystery and story arc, tone, humor and performances.

== Plot ==
Judy (Edi Patterson) and BJ (Tim Baltz) visit Eli (John Goodman) at his mansion and meet Junior (Eric Roberts). They believe they are in a relationship, prompting Eli to dismiss them. Later, Eli is approached by Thaniel Block (Jason Schwartzman), who is investigating the Gemstones' scandals, particularly Aimee-Leigh's supposed abusive behavior towards the staff. Eli refuses to cooperate with Block.

Jesse (Danny McBride) and Amber (Cassidy Freeman) announce Zion's Landing, which is met with an enthusiastic response. They then attend a fundraising event for Zion's Landing, where they meet Joe Jonas, one of the investors. However, they are taken aback when they find that the initial investment consists of $10 million. They ask Eli for a loan, but he refuses to get involved in the project. Eli in turn informs them that Block is writing a story about them, telling them not to reveal anything. Despite the warning, Jesse, Judy and Kelvin (Adam DeVine) decide that they need to "save" the family from any possible scandal.

They arrive at his rental cabin, where the door is revealed to be open. As Jesse and Judy enter the cabin, Kelvin is too afraid to enter and returns to the car. Kelvin discovers many people that were burned down and enters to warn Jesse and Judy. They find the corpse of Thaniel and accidentally slip in blood before fleeing in a panic. As they struggle to leave in their car, they are approached by a person but flee the scene. They meet with Eli at his mansion, but find him returning with Martin (Gregory Alan Williams). They are shocked to see Eli's hands and pants covered in blood, with him claiming it was due to a deer. When he asks what they want, they remain silent.

== Production ==
=== Development ===
In December 2021, HBO confirmed that the episode would be titled "After I Leave, Savage Wolves Will Come", and that it would be written by series creator Danny McBride, executive producer John Carcieri and executive producer Jeff Fradley, and directed by executive producer Jody Hill. This was McBride's eleventh writing credit, Carcieri's fifth writing credit, Fradley's fourth writing credit, and Hill's fifth directing credit.

== Reception ==
=== Viewers ===
In its original American broadcast, "After I Leave, Savage Wolves Will Come" was seen by an estimated 0.190 million household viewers with a 0.1 in the 18-49 demographics. This means that 0.1 percent of all households with televisions watched the episode. This was a 35% decrease in viewership from the previous episode, which was watched by 0.291 million household viewers with a 0.1 in the 18-49 demographics.

=== Critical reviews ===
"After I Leave, Savage Wolves Will Come" received mostly positive reviews from critics. Mike Vanderbilt of The A.V. Club gave the episode a "B+" grade and wrote, "Jesse, Judy, and Kelvin return to the compound and are discovered trying to clean up in the fountain by Eli, who claims to have been out on 'church business,' but is also covered in blood — a pretty great cliffhanger that elevates a very funny episode with some wild twists and turns."

Scott Tobias of Vulture gave the episode a 4 star rating out of 5 and wrote, "This would appear to be the incident that propels this season forward, much like the attempted blackmail last season, and suggests many twists to come beyond introducing a famous actor in the first episode and killing him in the second. There's a big difference between attempted blackmail and a possible triple homicide, but maybe there's not that huge a difference to the Gemstones, who haven't yet met a sin they couldn't absolve themselves for committing." Breeze Riley of Telltale TV gave the episode a 4 star rating out of 5 and wrote, "There's no doubt that how these smaller plotlines play out will be just as interesting, and hilarious, as the murder. During the lull of winter TV, The Righteous Gemstones arrives just in time to be your comedic saving grace."

Dylan Roth of The New York Observer wrote, "Directors David Gordon Green and Jody Hill continue to blend notes of thriller and horror into comedic scenes. And, through it all, there's something heartfelt about the entire affair that keeps me rooting for these rotten, entitled hucksters to find the happiness that they definitely don't deserve." James Preston Poole of Full Circle Cinema gave the episode a perfect 10 out of 10 rating and wrote, "If the season premiere of The Righteous Gemstones was the appetizer, this is the first course of what will undoubtedly be a scrumptious meal of a season. The intrigue is near Vice Principals level, and has me theorizing in the way that that show's mystery-laden first season did."
