= Never Avenge Yourselves, but Leave It to the Wrath of God =

- The Righteous Gemstones episode
- Episode no.: Season 2 Episode 6
- Directed by: Jody Hill
- Written by: Danny McBride; John Carcieri; Jeff Fradley
- Cinematography by: Paul Daley
- Editing by: Craig Hayes
- Original release date: February 6, 2022
- Running time: 30 minutes

Guest appearances
- Rusty Schwimmer as Sheriff Brenda; Eric Roberts as Glendon "Junior" Marsh, Jr.; Miles Burris as Titus; James DuMont as Chad; Kelton DuMont as Pontius Gemstone; Jody Hill as Levi; Troy Anthony Hogan as Matthew; Valyn Hall as Tiffany Freeman; Mary Hollis Inboden as Mandy; J. Larose as Gregory; Gavin Munn as Abraham Gemstone; Brock O'Hurn as Torsten; James Preston Rogers as Tan Man

Episode chronology
← Previous "Interlude II"	Next → "And Infants Shall Rule Over Them"

"Never Avenge Yourselves, but Leave It to the Wrath of God" is the sixth episode of the second season of the American dark comedy crime television series The Righteous Gemstones. It is the fifteenth overall episode of the series and was written by series creator Danny McBride, executive producer John Carcieri, and executive producer Jeff Fradley, and directed by executive producer Jody Hill. It was released on HBO on February 6, 2022.

The series follows a family of televangelists and megachurch pastors led by widowed patriarch Eli Gemstone. The main focus is Eli and his immature children, Jesse, Kelvin and Judy, all of whom face challenges in their lives. The series depicts the family's past and scandals, which unleash consequences. In the episode, Jesse faces the aftermath of the shooting, while Kelvin has his leadership tested.

According to Nielsen Media Research, the episode was seen by an estimated 0.288 million household viewers and gained a 0.1 ratings share among adults aged 18–49. The episode received positive reviews from critics, who praised the tone, performances and shocking ending.

== Plot ==
As the assassins continue shooting at the party-bus, Jesse (Danny McBride) unsuccessfully tries to shoot them, although Amber (Cassidy Freeman) surprisingly hits one of the gunmen as they flee. Jesse's report is not taken seriously by the police, and tells Eli (John Goodman) that Junior (Eric Roberts) may have been involved in hiring the gunmen, whom Jesse dubbed "Cycle Ninjas." Eli tells him he will take care of it and warns him to not leave the estate.

After his fight with Eli, Kelvin (Adam DeVine) has secluded himself, while also losing the support of the God Squad. Keefe (Tony Cavalero) convinces him to resume his duties, but his leadership is challenged by Torsten (Brock O'Hurn). Kelvin agrees to Torsten's challenge, where they will have to lift a heavy cross. Torsten manages to lift it, while Keefe fails to do so for Kelvin, causing Torsten to be named the new leader and to banish Kelvin from his own bedroom. Jesse is annoyed that the media praised Amber for shooting the gunman, believing that he should be proclaimed as a hero. Despite Eli's warning, Jesse forms his own squad to eventually fight Junior. Eli is also visited by BJ (Tim Baltz), who apologizes for the events at the afterparty, which moves Eli.

Inspired by their talk, Eli visits Kelvin, who is now forced to do menial labor. Eli wants to apologize, but Kelvin refuses to accept it, as he feels Eli does not respect him in anything. Jesse and his squad confront Junior in Memphis, threatening him to avoid his family. When Junior brushes it off, the squad throws rocks at him. Junior then states he will leave them in peace, and Jesse and the squad leave. That night, Eli is driving when he is surrounded by the Cycle Ninjas. They open fire at the car, hitting Eli and causing him to fall unconscious.

== Production ==
=== Development ===
In December 2021, HBO confirmed that the episode would be titled "Never Avenge Yourselves, but Leave It to the Wrath of God", and that it would be written by series creator Danny McBride, executive producer John Carcieri, and executive producer Jeff Fradley, and directed by executive producer Jody Hill. This was McBride's fifteenth writing credit, Carcieri's eighth writing credit, Fradley's sixth writing credit, and Hill's sixth directing credit.

== Reception ==
=== Viewers ===
In its original American broadcast, "Never Avenge Yourselves, but Leave It to the Wrath of God" was seen by an estimated 0.288 million household viewers with a 0.1 in the 18-49 demographics. This means that 0.1 percent of all households with televisions watched the episode. This was a slight decrease in viewership from the previous episode, which was watched by 0.309 million household viewers with a 0.1 in the 18-49 demographics.

=== Critical reviews ===
"Never Avenge Yourselves, but Leave It to the Wrath of God" received positive reviews from critics. Mike Vanderbilt of The A.V. Club gave the episode a "B" grade and wrote, "One of the most notable aspects of Gemstones is that it's not afraid to take the viewer to darker places and take chances. This is a truly shocking cliffhanger in an impressive season of television."

Scott Tobias of Vulture gave the episode a 4 star rating out of 5 and wrote, "This episode of The Righteous Gemstones keeps implying a question that's been frequently asked on the show: What will happen to the Gemstones after he's gone? Strike that. What's happening now that he's already gone in spirit?" Breeze Riley of Telltale TV gave the episode a 3.5 star rating out of 5 and wrote, "The fact Eli would take so many secrets to the grave makes it seem unlikely he’s actually dead (we didn't get that flashback interlude for nothing). It's still quite the inciting incident to bring the family together just when they're at their most divided."

Dylan Roth of The New York Observer wrote, "Positioning this critical dramatic twist at the tail end of a joke-filled episode is a classic Gemstones move, predictable only in hindsight. Is this the end of Eli Gemstone? Will this moment of crisis unify the fractured family into action? Whether next week's episode dives headlong into the emotional fallout of this event or twists it into more goofy posturing between the Gemstone kids is a win-win proposition for the audience, as these storytellers are equally deft at either tone." James Preston Poole of Full Circle Cinema gave the episode a 9 out of 10 rating and wrote, "The Righteous Gemstones this week is another slam dunk, marrying the tender to the hilarious in an episode that has an ending that could change the family forever."
