= For He Is a Liar and the Father of Lies =

- The Righteous Gemstones episode
- Episode no.: Season 2 Episode 3
- Directed by: David Gordon Green
- Written by: Danny McBride; Kevin Barnett; Chris Pappas
- Cinematography by: Michael Simmonds
- Editing by: Sam Seig
- Original release date: January 16, 2022
- Running time: 32 minutes

Guest appearances
- Eric Roberts as Glendon "Junior" Marsh Jr.; Miles Burris as Titus; Kelton DuMont as Pontius Gemstone; Cullen Moss as Brock; Gavin Munn as Abraham Gemstone; Brock O'Hurn as Torsten; Thomas Roberts as Anchorman

Episode chronology
← Previous "After I Leave, Savage Wolves Will Come"	Next → "As to How They Might Destroy Him"

"For He Is a Liar and the Father of Lies" is the third episode of the second season of the American dark comedy crime television series The Righteous Gemstones. It is the twelfth overall episode of the series and was written by series creator Danny McBride, Kevin Barnett and Chris Pappas, and directed by executive producer David Gordon Green. It was released on HBO on January 16, 2022.

The series follows a family of televangelists and megachurch pastors led by widowed patriarch Eli Gemstone. The main focus is Eli and his immature children, Jesse, Kelvin and Judy, all of whom face challenges in their lives. The series depicts the family's past and scandals, which unleash consequences. In the episode, Jesse, Judy and Kelvin start investigating Eli, believing that he was involved in Block's death.

According to Nielsen Media Research, the episode was seen by an estimated 0.327 million household viewers and gained a 0.1 ratings share among adults aged 18–49. The episode received mixed-to-positive reviews from critics, who praised the humor, but criticized the pacing and lack of character development.

== Plot ==
Eli (John Goodman) and Martin (Gregory Alan Williams) accompany Jesse (Danny McBride), Judy (Edi Patterson) and Kelvin (Adam DeVine) to Block's cabin, only to discover that the cabin has been engulfed in flames. Eli tells his children not to say anything to anyone, and also refuses to make any more contact with Junior (Eric Roberts).

During a performance, Kelvin and the "God Squad" get into an accident, which prompts some to question Kelvin's leadership. Delving into his past, Jesse, Judy and Kelvin find that Eli was involved in wrestling with Junior and start to wonder if he was involved in Block’s death. After checking his DMs where he assigned Martin to do something for him, the children confront him. They tell him that they support his decision of killing Block. A shocked Eli tells them he did not kill Block. In reality, Eli and Junior went bowling and Eli left with one of Junior's girls. Seduced, he tried to shave his groin but ended up accidentally cutting himself. The children are disturbed by the thought of their father moving on from Aimee-Leigh's death.

Kelvin is challenged by Titus (Miles Burris), who refuses to do any of his tasks. He allows Titus to prove him wrong by carrying a cross, which Titus fails to do due to his injury, so he places him in isolation for his actions. At his car, Eli is approached by Junior. Eli claims he is not a criminal anymore, ever since he met Aimee-Leigh. Junior leaves his car, but declares that they are now enemies.

== Production ==
=== Development ===
In December 2021, HBO confirmed that the episode would be titled "For He Is a Liar and the Father of Lies", and that it would be written by series creator Danny McBride, Kevin Barnett and Chris Pappas, and directed by executive producer David Gordon Green. This was McBride's twelfth writing credit, Barnett's third writing credit, Pappas' third writing credit, and Green's sixth directing credit.

== Reception ==
=== Viewers ===
In its original American broadcast, "For He Is a Liar and the Father of Lies" was seen by an estimated 0.327 million household viewers with a 0.1 in the 18-49 demographics. This means that 0.1 percent of all households with televisions watched the episode. This was a 72% increase in viewership from the previous episode, which was watched by 0.190 million household viewers with a 0.1 in the 18-49 demographics.

=== Critical reviews ===
"For He Is a Liar and the Father of Lies" received mixed-to-positive reviews from critics. Mike Vanderbilt of The A.V. Club gave the episode a "C+" grade and wrote, "Hardly a misstep, but the episode gets bogged down in plotting and doesn't deliver the big laughs expected from the show. The rollerblading and manscaping bits are dated and are arguably the comic centerpieces of the episode and fall flat. It's rare that a comedy's plotting is so dense, but it's one of the elements that elevate The Righteous Gemstones above typical fare and one of McBride's strengths is the ability to expertly balance the drama and laughs, but this week, it doesn't come together as it should."

Scott Tobias of Vulture gave the episode a 4 star rating out of 5 and wrote, "The Righteous Gemstones pauses on this last item because it's a show that likes to savor the transcendently stupid, like an oenophile taking in the tannins of a rarefied Cabernet Sauvignon. One advantage the show has over others, particularly TV comedies, is that directorial duties frequently fall to David Gordon Green or Jody Hill, both filmmakers known for their cinematic brio." Breeze Riley of Telltale TV gave the episode a 4 star rating out of 5 and wrote, "For such a close-knit family none of them seem to really know each other. Secrets are what caused so much friction in Season 1, and it seems like it will be their downfall once again. If this season is all about uncovering the real Eli, maybe it's time for the siblings to also face some uncomfortable truths about themselves."

Dylan Roth of The New York Observer wrote, "'For He Is a Liar and the Father of Lies' is burdened with pushing the plot of the season forward, but rest easy: it punctuates the necessary exposition with a full helping of physical comedy." James Preston Poole of Full Circle Cinema gave the episode a 7 out of 10 rating and wrote, "Like some of the jokes therein, 'For He Is A Liar and the Father of Lies' feels like The Righteous Gemstones on autopilot. That being said, it continues to be sharper than any other television comedy currently airing. Danny McBride and Jody Hill are a TV dream team who could make watching anything entertaining."
