= Interlude II =

- The Righteous Gemstones episode
- Episode no.: Season 2 Episode 5
- Directed by: David Gordon Green
- Written by: Danny McBride; John Carcieri; Jeff Fradley
- Cinematography by: Michael Simmonds
- Editing by: Justin Bourret
- Original release date: January 30, 2022
- Running time: 35 minutes

Guest appearances
- Wayne Duvall as Glendon Marsh, Sr.; Eric Roberts as Glendon "Junior" Marsh, Jr.; Mike Ostroski as Terry; Emma Shannon as Young Judy Gemstone; J. Gaven Wilde as Young Jesse Gemstone; Walton Goggins as Baby Billy Freeman

Episode chronology
← Previous "As to How They Might Destroy Him"	Next → "Never Avenge Yourselves, but Leave It to the Wrath of God"

"Interlude II" is the fifth episode of the second season of the American dark comedy crime television series The Righteous Gemstones. It is the fourteenth overall episode of the series and was written by series creator Danny McBride, executive producer John Carcieri, and executive producer Jeff Fradley, and directed by executive producer David Gordon Green. It was released on HBO on January 30, 2022.

The series follows a family of televangelists and megachurch pastors led by widowed patriarch Eli Gemstone. The main focus is Eli and his immature children, Jesse, Kelvin and Judy, all of whom face challenges in their lives. The series depicts the family's past and scandals, which unleash consequences. The episode is set in 1993 during the Christmas season, as Eli needs to take new measures to help the financial state of the ministry.

According to Nielsen Media Research, the episode was seen by an estimated 0.309 million household viewers and gained a 0.1 ratings share among adults aged 18–49. The episode received extremely positive reviews from critics, who praised the episode's dark content, humor, character development and performances.

== Plot ==
=== 1993 ===
During Christmas season, the Gemstones prepare for a performance at Gemstone Family Studios. Eli (John Goodman) wants to expand his base of operations, despite the fact that the ministry's finances are in peril. Baby Billy (Walton Goggins) visits the family, claiming that Gloria and his son abandoned him. Eli allows him to spend the holidays with them.

At his office, Eli is introduced to a young Martin (Gregory Alan Williams), on his first day as accountant. He is also contacted by Glendon Marsh Sr. (Wayne Duvall), who meets with him at a fast food restaurant. Marsh offers him $1 million, which interests Eli. He invites him to dine with the Gemstones, where it raises suspicion to Billy, which is reinforced when Roy (M. Emmet Walsh) expresses his disapproval of getting involved with Marsh. Later, Marsh tells Eli that he wants to launder money in his church, and Eli seriously considers it due to the church's state. After arguing with Aimee-Leigh (Jennifer Nettles), Eli tells Marsh that he will decline his request.

On Christmas Day, the Gemstones open their gifts. After giving him a gift, Aimee-Leigh reveals that she contacted Gloria and found that Billy abandoned his family. Billy angrily confesses that he couldn't financially maintain his family. Eli decides to pay him to perform in their Christmas special, which Billy accepts. During the performance, Eli announces that the studio will shut down and the ministry will expand, surprising Aimee-Leigh as they do not have the money needed. That night, Martin shows up at Eli's house, revealed to be held at gunpoint by Marsh. Marsh threatens to kill the Gemstones unless he agrees to his plan. Suddenly, Roy appears with a shotgun and shoots Marsh dead. Eli, Martin and Roy drive to a construction site (future site of The Exodus), where they dispose of Marsh's corpse by burying him in cement, and then return Roy to his mansion.

=== Present day ===
A lonely Eli rides the same rollercoaster he buried Marsh under, while Junior (Eric Roberts) plays with a gun in his office.

== Production ==
=== Development ===
In December 2021, HBO confirmed that the episode would be titled "Interlude II", and that it would be written by series creator Danny McBride, executive producer John Carcieri, and executive producer Jeff Fradley, and directed by executive producer David Gordon Green. This was McBride's fourteenth writing credit, Carcieri's seventh writing credit, Fradley's fifth writing credit, and Green's seventh directing credit.

== Reception ==
=== Viewers ===
In its original American broadcast, "Interlude II" was seen by an estimated 0.309 million household viewers with a 0.1 in the 18-49 demographics. This means that 0.1 percent of all households with televisions watched the episode. This was a slight increase in viewership from the previous episode, which was watched by 0.289 million household viewers with a 0.1 in the 18-49 demographics.

=== Critical reviews ===
"Interlude II" received extremely positive reviews from critics. Mike Vanderbilt of The A.V. Club gave the episode an "A" grade and wrote, "This week's episode is a near-perfect encapsulation of what makes Gemstones great, weaving sophomoric comedy into a family saga that is not afraid to take it down a darker path."

Scott Tobias of Vulture gave the episode a 4 star rating out of 5 and wrote, "Amid the absolute filth of any given episode of The Righteous Gemstones, it's always fascinating to take note of those moments when moral objections are raised, or somber religious sentiments are offered. Whenever it seems like the Gemstones have no limits at all to their sinfulness and venality, something will stick in their craw, and it's always worth puzzling over why. And who. And how far they've traveled down the slippery slope." Breeze Riley of Telltale TV gave the episode a 4 star rating out of 5 and wrote, "A step into the past is just what Season 2 needs to move forward in the present making Episode 5 a worthy interlude."

Dylan Roth of The New York Observer wrote, "The flashback episodes of Gemstones have a warmer and less chaotic energy from the rest of the series, owed to the steadying influence of Aimee-Leigh. It'll be interesting to watch the family's decline into decadence in bite-sized morsels throughout the life of the series, which, as of this week, has been picked up for at least one more season." James Preston Poole of Full Circle Cinema gave the episode a perfect 10 out of 10 rating and wrote, "No matter the amount of theories I can make regarding this episode, one thing is crystal clear: The Righteous Gemstones is still very much at its peak. Filled with great bits galore, it's astounding how much this show is leaving its mark as a bonafide crime drama. That's what happens when you get David Gordon Green to direct, I suppose. No, that's what happens when you have a team this talented allowed to see their vision through. The wait for next week's episode just got unbearable."
