= As to How They Might Destroy Him =

- The Righteous Gemstones episode
- Episode no.: Season 2 Episode 4
- Directed by: Danny McBride
- Written by: Danny McBride; John Carcieri; Edi Patterson
- Cinematography by: Michael Simmonds
- Editing by: Justin Bourret
- Original release date: January 23, 2022
- Running time: 39 minutes

Guest appearances
- Harley Jane Kozak as BJ's Mother; Eric André as Lyle Lissons; Jessica Lowe as Lindy Lissons; Valyn Hall as Tiffany Freeman; Jody Hill as Levi; Brock O'Hurn as Torsten; James Preston Rogers as Tan Man; Lily Sullivan as KJ; Jim Turner as Ken; Walton Goggins as Baby Billy Freeman

Episode chronology
← Previous "For He Is a Liar and the Father of Lies"	Next → "Interlude II"

"As to How They Might Destroy Him" is the fourth episode of the second season of the American dark comedy crime television series The Righteous Gemstones. It is the thirteenth overall episode of the series and was written by series creator Danny McBride, executive producer John Carcieri, and main cast member Edi Patterson, and directed by McBride. It was released on HBO on January 23, 2022.

The series follows a family of televangelists and megachurch pastors led by widowed patriarch Eli Gemstone. The main focus is Eli and his immature children, Jesse, Kelvin and Judy, all of whom face challenges in their lives. The series depicts the family's past and scandals, which unleash consequences. In the episode, BJ's baptism arrives and the family's conflicts arise.

According to Nielsen Media Research, the episode was seen by an estimated 0.289 million household viewers and gained a 0.1 ratings share among adults aged 18–49. The episode received extremely positive reviews from critics, who praised the confrontations, performances, character development and ending.

== Plot ==
=== 1993 ===
In Charlotte, North Carolina, Baby Billy (Walton Goggins) accompanies his wife, Gloria, and son, Harmon, in a mall during Christmas season. After giving his son special glasses, he says he will always be his father, no matter what happens. He then leaves the mall, abandoning them.

=== Present day ===
To please Judy (Edi Patterson), BJ (Tim Baltz) has agreed to be part of a baptism service, prompting them to invite his family for the service. Meanwhile, Jesse (Danny McBride) informs Lyle (Eric André) that he does not have the needed $10 million for their initial investment, disappointing Lyle. Kelvin (Adam DeVine) is also dismayed to discover that Eli (John Goodman) has prevented him from taking the "God Squad" to the Judaean Desert, as he wants him in BJ's baptism.

Billy returns for the baptism, with his music career seeing a small boost from his preaching sessions, and with Tiffany (Valyn Hall) pregnant. The family then attend an afterparty following the service, although Judy is not convinced that Eli has been sincere with BJ. Jesse then confronts Eli about not investing in them compared to his other tenures, but Eli is not interested. When BJ returns with a new outfit, he feels mocked by his sister, KJ (Lily Sullivan), and returns angry to his room. Jesse and Kelvin meet to express their frustrations with Eli, which is also joined by Billy.

Judy confronts KJ in the restroom, accusing her of wanting to have sex with her own brother. This prompts KJ to confront BJ by telling him that he is not a Gemstone, angering BJ and causing him to throw a piece of cake at her, accidentally hitting Eli while talking to a senator. BJ flees the scene while an angry Eli leaves. Kelvin confronts Eli in front of the "God Squad", calling him a "false prophet." This causes them to engage in a brutal fight, during which Kelvin shatters a portrait of Aimee-Leigh. When Kelvin refuses to apologize, an angry Eli then uses his wrestling technique to break Kelvin's thumbs. Kelvin is taken by an ambulance, which also makes him lose the support of the "God Squad", except for Keefe (Tony Cavalero). Billy is seen leaving the service and driving to Fayetteville. With no car to return home, Jesse and Amber (Cassidy Freeman) leave in Eli's party-bus. Due to a malfunction, they are forced to stop at a gas station. As they wait, they see a gang of bikers pulling off. The bikers then take out guns and shoot at them, forcing them to hide in the party-bus.

== Production ==
=== Development ===
In December 2021, HBO confirmed that the episode would be titled "As to How They Might Destroy Him", and that it would be written by series creator Danny McBride, executive producer John Carcieri, and main cast member Edi Patterson, and directed by McBride. This was McBride's thirteenth writing credit, Carcieri's sixth writing credit, Patterson's second writing credit, and McBride's second directing credit.

== Reception ==
=== Viewers ===
In its original American broadcast, "As to How They Might Destroy Him" was seen by an estimated 0.289 million household viewers with a 0.1 in the 18-49 demographics. This means that 0.1 percent of all households with televisions watched the episode. This was a 12% decrease in viewership from the previous episode, which was watched by 0.327 million household viewers with a 0.1 in the 18-49 demographics.

=== Critical reviews ===
"As to How They Might Destroy Him" received extremely positive reviews from critics. Mike Vanderbilt of The A.V. Club gave the episode an "A" grade and wrote, "The episode is co-written by McBride, Edi Patterson, and John Carcieri and directed by McBride, which elevates the episode. McBride is invested in these characters and fuses the high drama — and silly comedy — together expertly."

Scott Tobias of Vulture gave the episode a 4 star rating out of 5 and wrote, "Incredible episode for Edi Patterson as Judy, especially when she's dealing with BJ’s family, whom she sees as a miserable hassle at best and at worst a threat to BJ's mind and body, which she's claiming for herself." Breeze Riley of Telltale TV gave the episode a 3.5 star rating out of 5 and wrote, "Unfortunately, the drama and comedy balance of this episode ends up feeling off-kilter. Considering how The Righteous Gemstones usually avoids this pitfall, it's a bit disappointing."

Dylan Roth of The New York Observer wrote, "This week's Righteous Gemstones offers good laughs but better drama, as a large family gathering leads to a proportional explosion of petty conflicts." James Preston Poole of Full Circle Cinema gave the episode a perfect 10 out of 10 rating and wrote, "No matter who the assailants are, The Righteous Gemstones reaches its peak in this episode. Directed by Danny McBride, this episode is the epitome of dark comedy on television, combining breathless tension with breathless laughs. Whatever happens next week, we're lucky to be in an age of television where this kind of story can exist."
