= Doing Life =

2026 film by Tyler Perry

- Release poster
- Directed by: Tyler Perry
- Screenplay by: Tyler Perry
- Produced by: Tyler Perry; Angi Bones; Tony L. Strickland
- Starring: Naomi Baker; Jay Reeves
- Production company: Tyler Perry Studios
- Distributed by: Netflix
- Release date: October 2, 2026
- Country: United States
- Language: English

Doing Life is a 2026 American romantic drama film written and directed by Tyler Perry. It is starring Naomi Baker and Jay Reeves. It was released on Netflix on October 2, 2026.

== Premise ==
A single mother and former prison officer forms a bond with a reformed ex-convict who once protected her during a violent riot in the prison.

== Cast ==
- Naomi Baker as Anika
- Jay Reeves as Carousel
- Tamberla Perry as Cathy
- Karen Obilom as Trina
- Jasmine Sargent as Lisa
- Lucky Johnson as Quinn
- Danielle Moné Truitt as Denise

== Production ==
The film is written and directed by Tyler Perry with Perry, Angi Bones and Tony L. Strickland as producers. The film is Perry's seventh from his creative partnership with Netflix.

Speaking about the film Perry said:

"I was inspired by…the idea that sometimes the people we least expect can understand each other in ways no one else can. I wanted to tell a story about two people who, on the surface, seem like complete opposites, but who discover a deep commonality in the struggles they’re facing".

The cast is led by Naomi Baker and Jay Reeves, with Tamberla Perry, Karen Obilom, Jasmine Sargent, Lucky Johnson and Danielle Moné Truitt.

== Release ==
The film was released on Netflix on October 2, 2026.
