= And Infants Shall Rule Over Them =

- The Righteous Gemstones episode
- Episode no.: Season 2 Episode 7
- Directed by: Jody Hill
- Written by: Danny McBride; John Carcieri; Jeff Fradley
- Cinematography by: Paul Daley
- Editing by: Sam Seig; Todd Zelin
- Original air date: February 13, 2022
- Running time: 35 minutes

Guest appearances
- Miles Burris as Titus; James DuMont as Chad; Kelton DuMont as Pontius Gemstone; Jody Hill as Levi; Troy Anthony Hogan as Matthew; Valyn Hall as Tiffany Freeman; J. Larose as Gregory; Gavin Munn as Abraham Gemstone; Brock O'Hurn as Torsten; James Preston Rogers as Tan Man; Walton Goggins as Baby Billy Freeman

Episode chronology
← Previous "Never Avenge Yourselves, but Leave It to the Wrath of God"	Next → "The Prayer of a Righteous Man"

"And Infants Shall Rule Over Them" is the seventh episode of the second season of the American dark comedy crime television series The Righteous Gemstones. It is the sixteenth overall episode of the series and was written by series creator Danny McBride, executive producer John Carcieri, and executive producer Jeff Fradley, and directed by executive producer Jody Hill. It was released on HBO on February 13, 2022.

The series follows a family of televangelists and megachurch pastors led by widowed patriarch Eli Gemstone. The main focus is Eli and his immature children, Jesse, Kelvin and Judy, all of whom face challenges in their lives. The series depicts the family's past and scandals, which unleash consequences. In the episode, Eli is comatose after the shooting, causing the family to plan their next move.

According to Nielsen Media Research, the episode was seen by an estimated 0.288 million household viewers and gained a 0.1 ratings share among adults aged 18–49. The episode received critical acclaim, with critics praising the episode's emotional tone, character development, performances and action sequences.

== Plot ==
After the shooting, Eli (John Goodman) is now comatose in a hospital. Jesse (Danny McBride) and Amber (Cassidy Freeman) announce Eli's status to the church, intending to temporarily take leadership. Gideon (Skyler Gisondo) also announces that he is moving out of the house to work as a stuntman in Atlanta, stunning his parents.

BJ (Tim Baltz) helps Tiffany (Valyn Hall) in tracking Billy (Walton Goggins) through his credit cards. They confront him, discovering that he is selling fraudulent supplements. Tiffany confronts him for abandoning her, calling him out for abandoning Harmon back in 1993. Billy claims that he is raising money for the baby and insults Tiffany for not trusting him before leaving her. After not receiving support from his squad, Jesse confides in Martin (Gregory Alan Williams) that he feels responsible for Eli's condition after confronting Junior, also admitting that he no longer craves Eli's position. Martin suggests they can plan a new strategy: convincing the others that Eli's health is improving and intends to make confessions, which may attract the Cycle Ninjas. For their plan, Kelvin (Adam DeVine) releases Keefe (Tony Cavalero) from the God Squad's cage.

After announcing his "recovery" in the consecration, Eli is moved to the compound under the guise of remaining at the hospital. While staying at the hospital, Jesse is surprised to discover Gideon returning, intending to help. Due to a misunderstanding, Jesse ends up firing the whole private security detail, leaving Gideon, Martin, BJ and himself alone at the hospital. At the compound, Kelvin laments his situation and cries alongside Eli, who suddenly wakes up from his coma. As news reach the hospital, the Cycle Ninjas arrive. Jesse manages to subdue two of the gunmen while the rest flee on their bikes. Jesse allows Gideon to chase them, using a stun baton to subdue a gunman. He catches up with the other gunman, managing to knock him unconscious.

== Production ==
=== Development ===
In December 2021, HBO confirmed that the episode would be titled "And Infants Shall Rule Over Them", and that it would be written by series creator Danny McBride, executive producer John Carcieri, and executive producer Jeff Fradley, and directed by executive producer Jody Hill. This was McBride's sixteenth writing credit, Carcieri's ninth writing credit, Fradley's seventh writing credit, and Hill's seventh directing credit.

== Reception ==
=== Viewers ===
In its original American broadcast, "And Infants Shall Rule Over Them" was seen by an estimated 0.280 million household viewers with a 0.1 in the 18-49 demographics. This means that 0.1 percent of all households with televisions watched the episode. This was a slight decrease in viewership from the previous episode, which was watched by 0.288 million household viewers with a 0.1 in the 18-49 demographics.

=== Critical reviews ===
"And Infants Shall Rule Over Them" received critical acclaim. Mike Vanderbilt of The A.V. Club gave the episode an "A" grade and wrote, "It's great to see the Gemstone family grow, change and forgive, but it will be interesting to see if any of it sticks. After all, who wants to watch Jesse, Judy, and Kelvin be nice to each other for a full season?"

Scott Tobias of Vulture gave the episode a perfect 5 star rating out of 5 and wrote, "It's natural to focus on the dialogue and performances on the show because they're so wonderfully pungent, but it's worth noting how much stylistic panache Hill and Green bring to the table, which not only enhances the jokes but gives the action a propulsive, cinematic kick." Breeze Riley of Telltale TV gave the episode a 4.5 star rating out of 5 and wrote, "Overall, this episode sets up the core Gemstones to end the season in triumph, which is what you want to see after all their missteps and blunders. Although the Gemstones are mostly horrible people, there's a part of you that roots for them and believes maybe they can learn something from Eli's near-death experience."

Dylan Roth of The New York Observer wrote, "It will be interesting to see whether or not Kelvin will hold up his end of his bargain, and if so, what form his new path will take. After all, if any of these characters grows up too much, we no longer have a show." James Preston Poole of Full Circle Cinema gave the episode a 9 out of 10 rating and wrote, "No matter my disappointment with the ending, 'And Infants Shall Rule Over Them' is another great Jody Hill-directed episode packed with sentimentality, great guys, and an explosive climactic Akira homage."
