= Model Citizen (disambiguation) =

Model Citizen is a 2021 extended play by Meet Me at the Altar.

Model Citizen may also refer to:

- A person that sets a good example for other citizens
- Model Citizen Records, an independent record label
- Model Citizen: The Autobiography of Jeremy Meeks, a 2025 book
- Model Citizen, a 2000 album by Red Wanting Blue
- Model Citizen, a podcast hosted by Hunter McGrady
- "Model Citizen", a 1980 song by Alice Cooper from Flush the Fashion
- "Model Citizen", a 1991 song by Warren Zevon from Mr. Bad Example
- Michael McDonald: Model Citizen, a 2010 comedy special by Michael McDonald
- Model Citizens, a 2004 reality TV series
- The Model Citizen, an art exhibition by Sadia Sadia
- "A Model Citizen", an episode of Homicide: Life on the Street
- Model Citizen, a 2026 film written by Damian Lee.
