= The Prayer of a Righteous Man =

- The Righteous Gemstones episode
- Episode no.: Season 2 Episode 8
- Directed by: David Gordon Green
- Written by: Danny McBride; Grant Dekernion; Jeff Fradley
- Cinematography by: Michael Simmonds
- Editing by: Craig Hayes
- Original release date: February 20, 2022
- Running time: 32 minutes

Guest appearances
- Wayne Duvall as Glendon Marsh, Sr.; Eric Roberts as Glendon "Junior" Marsh, Jr.; Rusty Schwimmer as Sheriff Brenda; Macaulay Culkin as Harmon Freeman; Miles Burris as Titus; Valyn Hall as Tiffany Freeman; Jody Hill as Levi; Brock O'Hurn as Torsten; James Preston Rogers as Tan Man; Walton Goggins as Baby Billy Freeman

Episode chronology
← Previous "And Infants Shall Rule Over Them"	Next → "I Will Tell of All Your Deeds"

"The Prayer of a Righteous Man" is the eighth episode of the second season of the American dark comedy crime television series The Righteous Gemstones. It is the seventeenth overall episode of the series and was written by series creator Danny McBride, Grant Dekernion, and executive producer Jeff Fradley, and directed by executive producer David Gordon Green. It was released on HBO on February 20, 2022.

The series follows a family of televangelists and megachurch pastors led by widowed patriarch Eli Gemstone. The main focus is Eli and his immature children, Jesse, Kelvin and Judy, all of whom face challenges in their lives. The series depicts the family's past and scandals, which unleash consequences. In the episode, Eli recovers from his coma and decides to amend all mistakes from his family.

According to Nielsen Media Research, the episode was seen by an estimated 0.304 million household viewers and gained a 0.1 ratings share among adults aged 18–49. The episode received extremely positive reviews from critics, who praised the revelations, character development and performances.

== Plot ==
=== 1993 ===
In Memphis, Junior (Eric Roberts) confronts Marsh (Wayne Duvall) for never allowing him to take care of the business. Marsh considers his words and decides to retire, leaving business to Junior. Before leaving, Marsh threatens Junior at gunpoint to handcuff and steals all his money before losing contact with him.

=== Present day ===
The Cycle Ninjas have been arrested, and refuse to talk to Martin (Gregory Alan Williams) about the person who hired them. At the compound, a recovered Eli (John Goodman) praises his family for their actions, which motivates Kelvin (Adam DeVine) to confront the God Squad, managing to lift the heavy cross despite his broken thumbs and disbands them. This also motivates Judy (Edi Patterson) to stop Tiffany (Valyn Hall) from leaving and accept her as family.

Eli also informs Jesse (Danny McBride) that for his growth, he will help him with the $10 million investment. He also tells Jesse, Kelvin and Judy about Roy killing Glendon Marsh, also telling them his body is beneath their amusement park. He says he needs to inform Junior, and they agree to support him whenever he chooses to do it. Billy (Walton Goggins) is haunted by the appearance of Aimee-Leigh (Jennifer Nettles), who wants him to take more responsibility. He then visits a grown-up Harmon (Macaulay Culkin) at his house. Although surprised, he allows him to enter. He informs him on his life, also expressing his disappointment with the abandonment. While reluctant to accept him, Harmon agrees to punch him in the face to reconcile, and both make amends.

Before the Gemstones prepare for a performance, they are informed that Eli chose to talk with Junior alone in Memphis. Backed up with a security team, Junior confronts Eli for "sending" Jesse to threaten him. Eli confesses that Marsh threatened his family and that Roy killed him, and Junior believed that he helped him escape to Bolivia. While surprised at his reveal, Junior forgives Eli. Despite this, Junior reveals that he did not send the Cycle Ninjas, shocking Eli. In prison, guards are astonished to find that the Cycle Ninjas have escaped through a wall, meeting with bikers outside the prison and drive away.

== Production ==
=== Development ===
In December 2021, HBO confirmed that the episode would be titled "The Prayer of a Righteous Man", and that it would be written by series creator Danny McBride, Grant Dekernion, and executive producer Jeff Fradley, and directed by executive producer David Gordon Green. This was McBride's seventeenth writing credit, Dekernion's second writing credit, Fradley's eighth writing credit, and Green's eighth directing credit.

== Reception ==
=== Viewers ===
In its original American broadcast, "The Prayer of a Righteous Man" was seen by an estimated 0.304 million household viewers with a 0.1 in the 18-49 demographics. This means that 0.1 percent of all households with televisions watched the episode. This was a slight increase in viewership from the previous episode, which was watched by 0.280 million household viewers with a 0.1 in the 18-49 demographics.

=== Critical reviews ===
"The Prayer of a Righteous Man" received extremely positive reviews from critics. Mike Vanderbilt of The A.V. Club gave the episode a "B+" grade and wrote, "Eli Gemstone and Baby Billy are haunted by their pasts and 'The Prayer Of The Righteous Man' finds both men grappling with their pasts as the new generation looks to the future."

Scott Tobias of Vulture gave the episode a 4 star rating out of 5 and wrote, "The Righteous Gemstones is a show about American grifters, converting faith into cash through grotesque Sunday spectacles and an array of branded revenue streams, all in service of a family that amasses sins like miles on their private jets. Yet it's also a show about redemption, with characters who occasionally show the humility to confess wrongdoing and seek amends from those that they've wronged. While it would be fair to say that the Gemstones are too quick to forgive themselves, they also believe in what they're selling on stage." Breeze Riley of Telltale TV gave the episode a 4 star rating out of 5 and wrote, "Without a doubt, this season of The Righteous Gemstones belongs to John Goodman's Eli Gemstone. Even when Eli was laid up in the hospital, he was at the center of the plot."

Dylan Roth of The New York Observer wrote, "All season on The Righteous Gemstones the family has been learning hard lessons and confronting their own selfishness and immaturity. This week's episode, 'The Prayer of a Righteous Man', feels like graduation day, not just for the younger Gemstones but for patriarch Eli and Uncle Baby Billy, who each confront the sins of their past." James Preston Poole of Full Circle Cinema gave the episode a perfect 10 out of 10 rating and wrote, "'The Prayer of a Righteous Man' is as strong a case as any for creators Danny McBride and Jody Hill as genuine television auteurs. They've been honing their craft with several collaborations, working this series up into something bigger than only a comedy. The Righteous Gemstones has a level of control with character works, gags, action, drama, and even a tinge of horror and profundity that makes it the most exciting show of this era of television."
