= Nemesis (2026 TV series) =

American television series

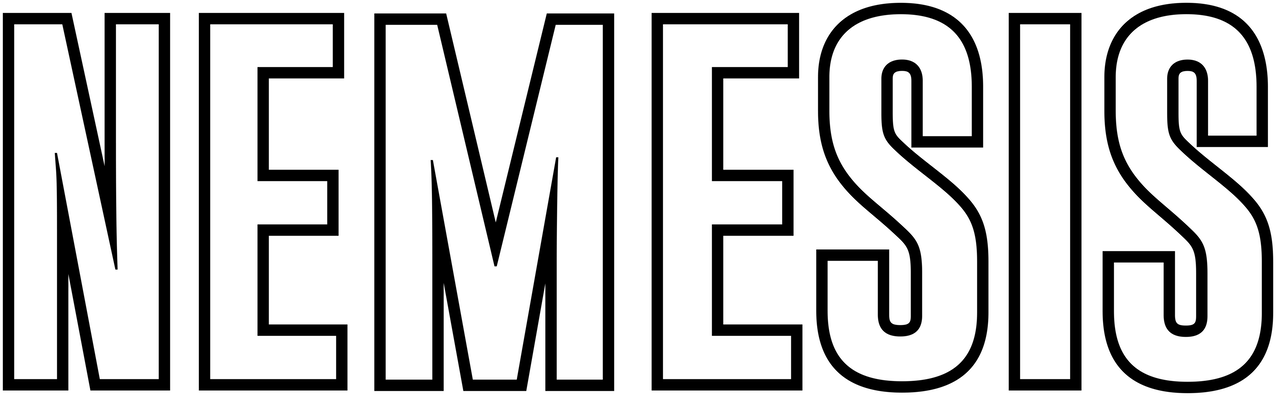
- Genre: Crime drama
- Created by: Courtney A. Kemp; Tani Marole
- Starring: Matthew Law; Y'lan Noel; Gabrielle Dennis; Cleopatra Coleman; Sophina Brown; Ariana Guerra; Cedric Joe; Tre Hale; Michael Potts; Jonnie Park; Domenick Lombardozzi; Jeff Pierre
- Music by: Larrance Dopson
- Country of origin: United States
- Original language: English
- No. of seasons: 1
- No. of episodes: 8

Production
- Executive producers: Courtney A. Kemp; Tani Marole; Chris Selak; Philipp A. Barnett; Mario Van Peebles
- Cinematography: Tommy Maddox-Upshaw; Bruce Francis Cole
- Editors: Spenser Reich; Shoshanah Tanzer; Addison Donnell; Christine Armstrong
- Running time: 56–63 minutes
- Production company: End of Episode

Original release
- Network: Netflix
- Release: May 14, 2026 – present

Nemesis is an American crime drama television series released on Netflix, co-created by Courtney A. Kemp and Tani Marole. It premiered on May 14, 2026.

== Premise ==
A police detective and a criminal mastermind play cat-and-mouse in Los Angeles.

== Cast ==
=== Main ===
- Matthew Law as Isaiah Stiles, an LAPD Robbery-Homicide Division Lieutenant
- Y'lan Noel as Coltrane Wilder, a master thief and career criminal.
- Gabrielle Dennis as Dr. Candice Stiles, Isaiah's wife and a therapist
- Cleopatra Coleman as Ebony Wilder, Coltrane's wife and accomplice
- Sophina Brown as Charlie, Ebony's half-sister and Coltrane's criminal connection.
- Ariana Guerra as Detective Yvette Cruz, Isaiah's LAPD's Robbery-Homicide Division partner
- Cedric Joe as Noah Stiles, Isaiah and Candace's teenaged son
- Tre Hale as Darren 'Stro' Stroman, a member of Coltrane's crew
- Michael Potts as Captain James Sealey, the LAPD's Robbery-Homicide Division Commanding Officer.
- Jonnie Park as Chris Choi, the getaway driver of Coltrane's crew
- Domenick Lombardozzi as Detective Dave Cerullo, LAPD's Robbery-Homicide Division member
- Jeff Pierre as Malik Jacobson

=== Recurring ===
- Shane Johnson as Harvey
- Stephanie Sigman as Detective Nicolette 'Nic' Harper working in LAPD's Robbery-Homicide Division
- Quincy Isaiah as Gideon 'Deon' Davis
- Jay Reeves as Jamel Brinkley
- Moe Irvin as Amos 'Nightmare' Stiles, Isaiah's father
- Mike O'Malley as Detective Rick Viggiano, working in LAPD's Robbery-Homicide Division
- Khalilah Joi as Ella Wilder
- Siua Ikale'o as Ika Manakani
- Mark Feuerstein as Sam Morrow
- Shahar Isaac as Andrei Malakian
- Allen Maldonado as Kevin the tech and home detention monitor

== Episodes ==
No.	Title	Directed by	Written by	Original release date
1	"A Long Time Coming"	Mario Van Peebles	Courtney A. Kemp & Tani Marole	May 14, 2026
2	"Breaking Protocol"	Mario Van Peebles	Gabriela Uribe	May 14, 2026
3	"Tête-À-Tête"	Millicent Shelton	Monica Mitchell	May 14, 2026
4	"It Was A Good Day"	Millicent Shelton	Mike Flynn	May 14, 2026
5	"Business. Never Personal."	Rob Hardy	Tani Marole	May 14, 2026
6	"The Die Is Cast"	Rob Hardy	Matt K. Turner	May 14, 2026
7	"Repercussions"	Ruben Garcia	Nkechi	May 14, 2026
8	"Zugzwang"	Ruben Garcia	Courtney A. Kemp	May 14, 2026

== Production ==
=== Development ===
Season 1 poster featuring Y'lan Noel and Matthew Law

The series was co-created by Courtney A. Kemp and Tani Marole, and was announced by Netflix in March 2025. Kemp is showrunner and executive producer for End of Episode. The series has the first two episodes directed by Mario Van Peebles, who is also an executive producer alongside Marole, Chris Selak and Philipp Barnett. In June 2026, the series was renewed for a second season.

=== Casting ===
The cast is led by Matthew Law and Y'lan Noel, and also includes Cleopatra Coleman, Tre Hale, Domenick Lombardozzi, Jonnie Park and Ariana Guerra. The series also has Gabrielle Dennis, Michael Potts in series regular roles, and Shane Johnson, Stephanie Sigman, Quincy Isaiah, Jay Reeves, Moe Irvin, Mike O'Malley, Khalilah Joi and Siua Ikale'o in recurring roles. In April 2025, Sophina Brown, Jeff Pierre and Cedric Joe joined the cast in series regular roles. In June 2025, Mark Feuerstein joined the cast in a recurring role.

== Release ==
The series was released on Netflix on May 14, 2026.

== Reception ==
On the review aggregator website Rotten Tomatoes, season one has a 78% approval rating based on 18 critic reviews, with an average of rated reviews of 6.5/10. The website's critics consensus reads, "Playing slow and steady with its cat-and-mouse game, Nemesis thrives on intensely committed performances, well-executed action sequences, and the ability to entertain with an assured absurdity that doesn't hinder its watchability." Metacritic, which uses a weighted average, gave a score of 70 out of 100 based on 9 critics, indicating "generally favorable" reviews.
