= Matthew Law =

American actor and filmmaker (born 1991)

- Born: November 6, 1991 (age 34); Yakima, Washington, United States
- Occupations: Actor, filmmaker, musician
- Years active: 2018–present

Matthew Law (born November 6, 1991) is an American actor and filmmaker. He is best known for his recurring role as O'Shon in the mockumentary sitcom Abbott Elementary, and the lead role as Detective Isaiah Stiles in the 2026 Netflix series Nemesis.

== Early life and education ==
Matthew Law was born on November 6, 1991 in Yakima, Washington, United States. He grew up in Seattle. He is the son of Moni Law, an attorney, and Glenn Phipps (1960–2000).

Law attended Ballard High School and Temple University.

== Career ==
Law plays a lead role as Detective Isaiah Stiles in the 2026 Netflix series Nemesis.

== Filmography ==
=== Film ===
Year	Title	Role	Notes
2020	A Fall from Grace	Jordan Bryant	
2023	Magic Carpet Rides	Leo	
2024	This Is Me... Now: A Love Story	The Cynic	

=== Television ===
Year(s)	Title	Role	Episodes
2018	Tyler Perry's The Paynes	Kendrick	Recurring role; 27 episodes
2018	Shooter	Young Colby	Episode: "Sins of the Father"
2019	Agents of S.H.I.E.L.D.	Agent Julian	4 episodes
2019–2025	Tyler Perry's The Oval	Kareem Richardson	Recurring role; 100 episodes
2022	NCIS: Los Angeles	Josh McCall	Episode: "Of Value"
2021	True Story	Davis Wilcher	Episode: "I Feel"
2021	Home Economics	Brendan	Episode: "Bottle Service, $800 Plus Tip (25% Suggested)"
2023	Ahsoka	Captain Porter	Episode: "Part One: Master and Apprentice"; credited as Matt Law
2024–present	Abbott Elementary	O’Shon	Recurring role
2024	Based on a True Story	Nick	3 episodes
2026	Nemesis	Detective Isaiah Stiles	Main role

=== Music videos ===
Year	Title	Role	Performer
2024	Can't Get Enough	Himself	Jennifer Lopez

=== Short films ===
Year	Title	Role	Notes
2019	Moved	Him	
2021	Just the Two of Us	Yellow	
2022	Piece	Defense Attorney	
N/A	Wishful Thinking	Manny	
