= Beyond (American TV series) =

2017 supernatural drama TV series

- Genre: Fantasy; Drama; Science fiction
- Created by: Adam Nussdorf
- Starring: Burkely Duffield; Dilan Gwyn; Jordan Calloway; Jonathan Whitesell; Michael McGrady; Romy Rosemont; Jeff Pierre; Eden Brolin
- Composer: Toby Chu
- Country of origin: United States
- Original language: English
- No. of seasons: 2
- No. of episodes: 20

Production
- Executive producers: Tim Kring; Brian Kavanaugh-Jones; Justin Levy; Dan Friedkin; Steven A. Adelson; Adam Nussdorf; David Eick
- Producer: Tracey Jeffrey
- Running time: 41–43 minutes
- Production companies: Automatik; Imperative Entertainment

Original release
- Network: Freeform
- Release: January 1, 2017 – March 22, 2018

Beyond is an American fantasy drama television series created by Adam Nussdorf that premiered on Freeform on January 1, 2017. The series stars Burkely Duffield, Dilan Gwyn, Jeff Pierre, Jonathan Whitesell, Michael McGrady, and Romy Rosemont. On January 10, 2017, Freeform renewed the series for a 10-episode second season, which premiered on January 18, 2018, and finished on March 22, 2018. On March 29, 2018, Freeform announced they had cancelled the series after two seasons.

== Plot ==
Holden Matthews wakes up from a 12-year coma and discovers that he now has supernatural abilities, ones that propel him into the middle of a dangerous conspiracy. Holden wants to figure out what happened to him during the past dozen years and how to live in a world that has changed significantly. One big question is what happened to him beyond this Earth's timeline in the hereafter. As Holden tries to adjust to adulthood, a woman named Willa appears in his life.

It is revealed that during his coma, Holden's consciousness was awake and active in The Realm, a supernatural dimension where the consciousness of anyone who is comatose will live. In The Realm is a bridge between the comatose people and the dead. Willa's father and maternal grandfather Isaac and Arthur, learned how to access The Realm, hoping to reach Willa's mother who entered a coma during Willa's birth and later died.

After Willa joined them in The Realm, she and her grandfather came to realize its dangers, and tried to stop the research. Isaac refuses to stop, forms the Hollow Sky institute to continue the dangerous research, and uses a hired killer to manipulate or eliminate those who get in the way of his efforts. Isaac believes Holden can help him achieve his goals, creating the underlying conflict of the series.

== Cast and characters ==
=== Main ===
- Burkely Duffield as Holden Matthews
- Dilan Gwyn as Willa Frost
- Jordan Calloway as Kevin McArdle (Note: Colloway was listed as "starring" in the pilot, but was later downgraded to a guest role.)
- Jonathan Whitesell as Luke Matthews
- Michael McGrady as Tom Matthews
- Romy Rosemont as Diane Matthews
- Jeff Pierre as Jeff McArdle (Note: Pierre was not in the pilot, but was listed as "starring" from the second episode—"Tempus Fugit"—onward.)
- Eden Brolin as Charlie Singer (season 2; recurring season 1)

=== Recurring ===
- Erika Alexander as Tess Shoemacher
- Peter Kelamis as the Man in the Yellow Jacket
- Alex Diakun as Arthur
- Toby Levins as Sheriff Dayton
- Chad Willett as Pastor Ian
- Kendall Cross as Mel
- Patrick Sabongui as Daniel
- Martin Donovan as Isaac Frost
- Emilija Baranac as Jamie (season 1)

== Production ==
A pilot was green-lit for Freeform, then known as ABC Family, in April 2015. The series was ordered for production in November 2015 with a ten-episode order. A sneak peek aired on January 1, 2017, with the official premiere on January 2, 2017.

On January 10, 2017, Freeform renewed the series for a second season; season 2 premiered on January 18, 2018, with a double episode. The 10-episode second season's finale aired March 22, 2018.

== Episodes ==
=== Series overview ===
Season	Episodes	Originally released	
Season	Episodes	First released	Last released
1	10	January 1, 2017	February 27, 2017
2	10	January 18, 2018	March 22, 2018

=== Season 1 (2017) ===
No. overall	No. in season	Title	Directed by	Written by	Original release date	U.S. viewers (millions)
1	1	"Pilot"	Lee Toland Krieger	Adam Nussdorf	January 1, 2017 (Note: This episode was shown as a sneak peek on January 1, 2017, and then as the official series premiere on January 2, 2017. The viewership data is 1.18 million viewers for the official premiere on January 2, 2017.)	0.95
2	2	"Tempus Fugit"	Steven A. Adelson	Adam Nussdorf	January 2, 2017	1.07
3	3	"Ties That Bind"	Steven A. Adelson	Mark Dube	January 9, 2017	0.60
4	4	"The Man in the Yellow Jacket"	Sam Hill	Hillary Benefiel	January 16, 2017	0.51
5	5	"Fancy Meeting You Here"	Nick Copus	Jim Galasso	January 23, 2017	0.41
6	6	"Celeste"	Darnell Martin	Mimi Won Techentin	January 30, 2017	0.38
7	7	"The Hour of the Wolf"	Nick Copus	Ryan Mottesheard	February 6, 2017	0.32
8	8	"Last Action Hero"	Guy Norman Bee	Elias Benavidez	February 13, 2017	0.35
9	9	"Out of Darkness"	Steven A. Adelson	Adam Nussdorf	February 20, 2017	0.38
10	10	"Into the Light"	Steven A. Adelson	Adam Nussdorf	February 27, 2017	0.30

=== Season 2 (2018) ===
A recap special entitled "Beyond: What Lies Ahead" aired on December 28, 2017, and drew 357,000 viewers.

No. overall	No. in season	Title	Directed by	Written by	Original release date	Prod. code	U.S. viewers (millions)
11	1	"Two Zero One"	Steven A. Adelson	Adam Nussdorf	January 18, 2018	2001	0.31
12	2	"Cheers, Bitch"	Steven A. Adelson	Adam Nussdorf	January 18, 2018	2002	0.15
13	3	"No Es Bueno"	Nick Copus	Marc Dube	January 25, 2018	2003	0.23
14	4	"Knock, Knock"	Vanessa Parise	Nichole Beattie	February 1, 2018	2004	0.23
15	5	"Six Feet Deep"	Nick Copus	Ryan Mottesheard	February 8, 2018	2005	0.25
16	6	"Bedposts"	Carol Banker	Jim Galasso	February 15, 2018	2006	0.38
17	7	"Stir"	Dawn Wilkinson	Hillary Benefiel	March 1, 2018	2007	0.23
18	8	"I Scream, You Scream"	Rick Bota	David Eick	March 8, 2018	2008	0.15
19	9	"F.G.B."	Steven A. Adelson	Adam Nussdorf	March 15, 2018	2009	0.24
20	10	"There's No Home for You Here"	Steven A. Adelson	Adam Nussdorf	March 22, 2018	2010	0.26

== Broadcast ==
Internationally, the series premiered in Australia on FOX8 on January 17, 2017. In the UK and Ireland, all ten first-season episodes were available on Netflix before their U.S. broadcasts, and new second-season episodes were added weekly.

The entire first season was released on digital platforms, such as OnDemand, the Freeform App and website, and Hulu, on January 2, 2017.

== Reception ==
=== Critical reception ===
On the review aggregator website Rotten Tomatoes, the first season holds an approval rating of 42% based on 12 reviews, with an average rating of 6.10/10. The site's critics consensus reads, "Beyond stays mired in contrived cliché, despite heartwarming performances from a capable cast."

=== Ratings ===
Viewership and ratings per season of Beyond
Season	Episodes	First aired		Last aired		Avg. viewers (millions)	18–49 rank
Season	Episodes	Date	Viewers (millions)	Date	Viewers (millions)	Avg. viewers (millions)	18–49 rank
1	10	January 1, 2017	0.95	February 27, 2017	0.30	0.53	TBD
2	10	January 18, 2018	0.31	March 22, 2018	0.26	0.24	TBD

=== Accolades ===
Year	Award	Category	Nominee(s)	Result	Ref.
2017	Leo Awards	Best Supporting Performance by a Male in a Dramatic Series	Peter Kelamis	Won	
2017	Saturn Awards	Best Fantasy Television Series	Beyond	Nominated	
2018	American Society of Cinematographers Awards	Outstanding Achievement in Cinematography in Episode of a Series for Commercial Television	Jon Joffin	Won	
2018	Leo Awards	Best Direction in a Dramatic Series	Vanessa Parise	Nominated	
2018	Leo Awards	Best Supporting Performance by a Male in a Dramatic Series	Peter Kelamis	Won	
2018	Leo Awards	Best Visual Effects, Dramatic Series	Ryan Jensen, Dong-Hyun Kim, Alican Sesli, Brandon Doty	Nominated	
