= But Esau Ran to Meet Him =

- The Righteous Gemstones episode
- Episode no.: Season 3 Episode 2
- Directed by: Jody Hill
- Written by: John Carcieri; Danny McBride
- Cinematography by: Paul Daley
- Editing by: David Canseco
- Original release date: June 18, 2023
- Running time: 31 minutes

Guest appearances
- Kristen Johnston as May–May Montgomery; Lukas Haas as Chuck Montgomery; Sturgill Simpson as Marshall; Casey Wilson as Kristy; Steve Zahn as Peter Montgomery; James DuMont as Chad; Jody Hill as Levi; Troy Anthony Hogan as Matthew; J. Larose as Gregory; Robert Oberst as Karl Montgomery; Stephen Schneider as Stephen; Quincy Dunn-Baker as Dakota; Stephen Louis Grush as Jacob

Episode chronology
← Previous "For I Know the Plans I Have for You"	Next → "For Their Nakedness Is Your Own Nakedness"

"But Esau Ran to Meet Him" is the second episode of the third season of the American dark comedy crime television series The Righteous Gemstones. It is the 20th overall episode of the series and was written by executive producer John Carcieri, and series creator Danny McBride, and directed by executive producer Jody Hill. It was released on HBO on June 18, 2023, and also was available on Max on the same date. The episode aired back-to-back with the previous episode, "For I Know the Plans I Have for You".

The series follows a family of televangelists and megachurch pastors led by widowed patriarch Eli Gemstone. The main focus is Eli and his immature children, Jesse, Kelvin and Judy, all of whom face challenges in their lives. The series depicts the family's past and scandals, which unleash consequences. In the episode, the Gemstones approach May–May's husband, Peter, in order to save her children from his influence.

According to Nielsen Media Research, the episode was seen by an estimated 0.223 million household viewers and gained a 0.07 ratings share among adults aged 18–49. The episode received extremely positive reviews from critics, who praised the humor, supporting cast and action sequences.

== Plot ==
Stephen (Stephen Schneider) is talking with his wife, Kristy (Casey Wilson), revealing he was fired from the church. He hides his infidelity, so she believes he succumbed to his drug addiction. As their argument escaltes, she hits him in the head with a glass blender in front of their kids.

Tired of seeing Gideon (Skyler Gisondo) smoking and doing nothing following an injury, Jesse (Danny McBride) assigns him as their new driver. He drives Jesse, Eli (John Goodman), Judy (Edi Patterson) and Kelvin (Adam DeVine) to visit Peter (Steve Zahn), May–May's husband, at his compound. Peter commands a militia known as the Brothers of Tomorrow's Fires, where the inhabitants carry weapons and prepare for Doomsday. Peter does not respect the Gemstones, accusing them of using people for money and exploiting the church for their benefit. Later the FBI raids the compound, shooting and arresting many of the militiamen, although Peter, and his sons Karl (Robert Oberst) and Chuck (Lukas Haas) escape to a safe house. Peter believes Karl and Chuck colluded with Eli and May–May (Kristen Johnston), so he tortures one of his henchmen to prove his point.

During a meeting with ministers, Jesse, Judy and Kelvin make a poor impression. When a minister insults them using Aimee-Leigh's name, Jesse throws his shoe, which prompts the ministers to attack them with their own shoes. Eli meets with May–May, Karl and Chuck at a motel, worried that Peter may know about their encounters, and May–May is also harassed by militiamen watching her outside the motel. Eli manages to retrieve Karl and Chuck out of the motel and escape with Gideon behind the wheel, just as the militiamen follow them. After a tense chase, the two cars intercept Gideon's car and prepare to ram it. Gideon manages to evade them, and the two cars crash. Gideon then drives off.

== Production ==
=== Development ===
The episode was written by executive producer John Carcieri and series creator Danny McBride, and directed by executive producer David Gordon Green. This was Carcieri's twelfth writing credit, McBride's twentieth writing credit, and Hill's tenth directing credit.

=== Casting ===
In May 2022, it was reported that Lukas Haas, Robert Oberst, Sturgill Simpson, and Casey Wilson would join the series in recurring roles. The following month, Steve Zahn was also announced to join the series in a recurring role.

== Reception ==
=== Viewers ===
In its original American broadcast, "But Esau Ran to Meet Him" was seen by an estimated 0.223 million household viewers with a 0.07 in the 18-49 demographics. This means that 0.07 percent of all households with televisions watched the episode. This was a slight decrease in viewership from the previous episode, which was watched by 0.238 million household viewers with a 0.06 in the 18-49 demographics.

=== Critical reviews ===
"But Esau Ran to Meet Him" received extremely positive reviews from critics. Matt Schimkowitz of The A.V. Club gave the episode an "A–" grade and wrote, "In retrospect, the second episode makes the intentions of the first all the more evident. The premiere episode reset the family, reminding us who they are and what they’ve been through, slowly introducing characters that will get shaded in later. But it's episode two where the show really stakes its claim and takes over. This episode was all hellfire and brimstone as the unbridled anger of the Gemstones overtook the church, delivering us one of the funniest half-hours in the show’s history. It’s great to have the Gemstones back."

Scott Tobias of Vulture gave the episode a 4 star rating out of 5 and wrote, "The chaos that erupts when the ATF invades the camp and, later, when militiamen in two trucks chase after Eli's SUV, are a reminder that The Righteous Gemstones has in Jody Hill, a director with a more robust sense of style than you usually see on TV. The raid is beautifully choreographed chaos, with the camera clinging to Eli's nephews as they slip through a gauntlet of tackles and headshots on their way to a safe house. The chase sequence zips through a playground and a golf course before screaming through the city streets, but Hill treats the action with a layer of slapstick." Breeze Riley of Telltale TV gave the episode a 4.5 star rating out of 5 and wrote, "Can the kids stop the church and their personal lives from falling apart? Or will the Gemstones once more be wracked by a scandal they have to pull themselves out of? Ultimately it's hard to say if any of these stakes matter as long as the jokes are good, but you’ll want to keep watching."
