= Safety (2020 film) =

2020 film by Reginald Hudlin

- Official release poster
- Directed by: Reginald Hudlin
- Written by: Nick Santora
- Produced by: Mark Ciardi; Gordon Gray
- Starring: Jay Reeves; Thaddeus J. Mixson; Corinne Foxx; Matthew Glave; James Badge Dale
- Cinematography: Shane Hurlbut
- Edited by: Terel Gibson
- Music by: Marcus Miller
- Production companies: Walt Disney Pictures; Mayhem Pictures; Select Films; The Walt Disney Company
- Distributed by: Disney+
- Release date: December 11, 2020 (United States)
- Running time: 122 minutes
- Country: United States
- Language: English
- Budget: $26 million

Safety is a 2020 American biographical sports drama family film based on the story of Ray McElrathbey, a football player who battled family adversity to join the Clemson Tigers. Directed by Reginald Hudlin, produced by Mark Ciardi, and written by Nick Santora, the film features Jay Reeves in the lead role. The feature film, a Walt Disney Pictures production, was made available to stream on Disney+ from December 11, 2020.

== Plot ==
In South Carolina in the 2000s, Ray McElrathbey is a freshman at Clemson University, having been accepted on a football scholarship for their team, the Tigers. He is quickly thrust into campus life as he tries to balance his school work and football career. He begins to receive numerous phone calls from his younger brother Fahmarr, but tries to ignore him to study. He quickly takes an interest in sports journalist student Kaycee Stone while also butting heads with football captain Keller. One day, Ray learns that Fahmarr is not at home with their mother, Tonya, and races back home over the weekend to find that their mother has relapsed and Fahmarr has been staying with a former acquaintance, presumed to be a dealer. Ray takes Fahmarr to child services and, faced with the prospect of losing Fahmarr to the system, decides to take him in, albeit temporarily so that Tonya can recover in a month.

Ray hides Fahmarr in his dorm with his roommate Daniel Morelli discovering him. He promises to keep him a secret while also helping him out. Ray soon becomes close with Kaycee though she begins to suspect that he is hiding something from her. Fahmarr also gets enrolled in a new school, though the different environment becomes slightly alienating for him. Eventually, studying, practice and caring for Fahmarr begin to take its toll on Ray and Daniel brings in the rest of the freshman squad to help with keeping Fahmarr out of trouble. Unfortunately, team captain Keller discovers Fahmarr and forces Ray to come clean about it. Coach Bowden and Simmons reprimand him and Ray tells Fahmarr that he must leave as Tonya's program is almost over.

Tonya informs the boys that she will be staying in the program much longer, meaning that Fahmarr must go into the system. Ray becomes depressed and tells Kaycee about why he has been acting so strange. After some encouragement, Ray speaks with Simmons about Fahmarr and he helps him go out and retrieve him. They must live off campus while Ray holds side jobs to keep themselves afloat. Fahmarr goes back to school and begins crushing on a girl named Shannon. Meanwhile, Ray's relationship with both Keller and Kaycee improve, and Ray becomes a better player. Fahmarr sits-in in one of their classes and helps the team with one of their games. Kaycee, impressed with the changes, offers to print Ray's story in the paper, despite him not wanting to come off as a charity case. Soon, everyone in the community begins offering help to the McElrathbeys as their relationships improve.

Shortly before the Bowden Bowl, Ray is informed that the NCAA is investigating his situation as they believe that he is receiving irregular benefits. Despite the support of Bowden and Simmons, they are informed that it seems impossible that they will be waived. Ray begins to prevent any more charity to himself or Fahmarr and shuts himself off from everyone. He soon discovers that Fahmarr has run away and everyone goes searching for him; eventually finding him at a diner. Ray promises that he will continue to look after him no matter what and he reluctantly forces Tonya to hand full custody of Fahmarr over to him. Ray and Fahmarr head to the hearing at the NCAA, along with his coaches, his team, Kaycee and the community. After giving a heartfelt speech, the board ultimately decide to allow Ray and Fahmarr all the necessary benefits needed. Fahmarr is seen with the rest of the Tigers and is given his own jersey as he joins his brother on the field to prepare for the big game.

During the credits, it is revealed that Ray graduated as he and Fahmarr reunited with their completely sober mother. Real footage is played of their appearance on Oprah as well as Ray playing football.

== Cast ==
- Jay Reeves as Ray McElrathbey
  - Javien Jackson as Young Ray
- Thaddeus J. Mixson as Fahmarr McElrathbey
- Corinne Foxx as Kaycee Stone
- Matthew Glave as Coach Tommy Bowden
- James Badge Dale as Coach Brad Simmons
- Robert Crayton as Coach Brett Slade
- Hunter Sansone as Daniel Morelli
- Miles Burris as Keller
- Isaac Bell as Fresh / Eugene
- Elijah Bell as Pop / Marcus
- Chris Setticase as Tobin
- Stephen Brown as Isaiah
- Luke Tennie as Solomon
- Coco Hillary as Morrow
- Amanda Warren as Tonya McElrathbey
- Tom Nowicki as Dr. Matthews
- Kylee Brown as Shannon

The real Ray McElrathbey cameos as another football player named Raheem. Former University of Alabama quarterback Blake Sims also appears, in his acting debut, as a quarterback for FAU.

== Production ==
In July 2019, it was announced that Reginald Hudlin was directing the film, which would stream on Disney+.

Filming began in September that year in South Carolina, with Jay Reeves, Thaddeus J. Mixon, Corinne Foxx, Luke Tennie, Matthew Glave, Miles Burris, and Hunter Sansone. Filming also took place in Atlanta, and wrapped in mid-November.

== Release ==
Safety was digitally released on December 11, 2020, on Disney+.

== Reception ==
=== Critical response ===
On Rotten Tomatoes, the film holds an approval rating of 80% based on 41 reviews, with an average rating of 6.4/10. The website's critics consensus reads: "Fans of uplifting sports dramas will find Safety in this skillfully told fact-based story about an athlete overcoming adversity." On Metacritic, it has a weighted average score of 55 out of 100, based on nine critics, indicating "mixed or average reviews".

Kyle Turner of The New York Times praised Reginald Hudlin's direction and found some of the scenes amusing, writing, "Safety is, for better, neither a strict sports movie nor a rigid tale of adversity. Banal time management scenes are enlivened by the director Reginald Hudlin's fun camera swooping and rollicking tumbles as Ray's life grows dizzyingly busy. Some of the earlier moments in the film, like when Fahmarr hides in increasingly ludicrous spots, have the humor of a heist comedy. And Hudlin intermittently blends in sharp visual gags." Jennifer Green of Common Sense Media rated the movie 4 out of 5 stars, praised the presence of positive messages and role models, saying, "Safety handles mature topics, including drug addiction and unreliable parents, but is ultimately very inspiring and appropriate for older tweens.[...] The film shows the devastating impact of poverty and drugs, and there's some emotional intensity." Mae Abdulbaki of Screen Rant rated the film 3.5 out of 5 stars, stating, "Safety's message is ultimately that no one accomplishes anything on an individual level and that everyone needs to be supported and cared for to focus and succeed. Ray still overcomes adversity, but writers Rick Santora and Randy McKinnon sidestep the stereotypes that so often plague sports films to do so, making it one of the better sports films to be released in some time."

Nick Allen of RogerEbert.com gave the movie 2.5 out of 4 stars, writing, "Here is a good movie, with a good heart, even though you don't trust the screenplay. For the incredible set-up at the center, it's told with a lot of cliches, so much that it dilutes their overall impact even if it gives writer Nick Santora's script all sorts of ups and downs. Josh Spiegel of Slashfilm rated the film 5 out of 10, claiming, "Safety feels like the kind of movie that we might see more of, not just from Disney+ but other studios looking for something heartwarming in a world that gets colder each day. [...] It's a good thing that Ray McElrathbey was able to fight through impossible adversity and get the NCAA to waver on its cruel measures towards its own players. And the cast of Safety is as convincing as possible. Disney knows how to make blandly effective sports dramas. But some stories are less inspiring than they seem."

=== Accolades ===
Year	Award	Category	Nominee(s)	Result	Ref
2021	Motion Picture Sound Editors	Outstanding Achievement in Sound Editing - Non-Theatrical Feature	Christopher S. Aud, Byron Wilson, Phil Barrie, Greg ten Bosch, Aaron Glascock, Daniel Saxlid, Terry Rodman, Steve Durkee, Sanaa Kelley, Matt Salib	Nominated	
2021	Writers Guild of America	Original Long Form	Nick Santora	Nominated	

== See also ==
- List of American football films
