= I Will Tell of All Your Deeds =

- The Righteous Gemstones episode
- Episode no.: Season 2 Episode 9
- Directed by: Jody Hill
- Written by: Danny McBride; John Carcieri; Jeff Fradley
- Cinematography by: Michael Simmonds; Paul Daley
- Editing by: Justin Bourret; Todd Zelin
- Original release date: February 27, 2022
- Running time: 40 minutes

Guest appearances
- Jason Schwartzman as Thaniel Block; Eric André as Lyle Lissons; Jessica Lowe as Lindy Lissons; John Amos as Buddy Lissons; Joe Jonas as Himself; Eric Roberts as Glendon "Junior" Marsh, Jr.; Rusty Schwimmer as Sheriff Brenda; Macaulay Culkin as Harmon Freeman; Chloe Bridges as Meagan; James DuMont as Chad; Kelton DuMont as Pontius Gemstone; Jody Hill as Levi; Troy Anthony Hogan as Matthew; Mary Hollis Inboden as Mandy; J. Larose as Gregory; Gavin Munn as Abraham Gemstone; Valyn Hall as Tiffany Freeman; Harley Jane Kozak as BJ's Mother; Dan O'Connor as Minister Mike; James Preston Rogers as Tan Man; Lily Sullivan as KJ; Jim Turner as Ken; Walton Goggins as Baby Billy Freeman

Episode chronology
| ← Previous "The Prayer of a Righteous Man" | Next → "For I Know the Plans I Have for You" |

"I Will Tell of All Your Deeds" is the ninth episode and season finale of the second season of the American dark comedy crime television series The Righteous Gemstones. It is the eighteenth overall episode of the series and was written by series creator Danny McBride, executive producer John Carcieri, and executive producer Jeff Fradley, and directed by executive producer Jody Hill. It was released on HBO on February 27, 2022.

The series follows a family of televangelists and megachurch pastors led by widowed patriarch Eli Gemstone. The main focus is Eli and his immature children, Jesse, Kelvin and Judy, all of whom face challenges in their lives. The series depicts the family's past and scandals, which unleash consequences. In the episode, Thaniel Block's killer is revealed, while Eli takes matters into his own hands at finding the truth.

According to Nielsen Media Research, the episode was seen by an estimated 0.402 million household viewers and gained a 0.1 ratings share among adults aged 18–49. The episode received extremely positive reviews from critics, who praised the dark nature of the episode, tone, directing and closure to the main mystery.

== Plot ==
=== Flashback ===
Lyle Lissons (Eric André) meets with Thaniel Block (Jason Schwartzman) at his cabin. Lyle is revealed to provide incrimating information about televangelists, but refuses to disclose anything about the Gemstones, as he needs Jesse (Danny McBride) for his investment in Zion's Landing. Block then threatens to write a scathing article about Lyle, who reveals he caught four of his men skimming. Thaniel says that is not particularly newsworthy, causing Lyle to storm off to a car where the same four men he sold out are waiting. Lyle says for them for draw weapons with the intent of intimidating Block. One of them produces a grenade, which is mishandled and destroys the car, alerting Block who draws a gun. In the chaos, another grenade detonates, which kills two of Lyle's associates. As Block retreats to his cabin, a bullet ricochets and kill him. Lyle then hides in a closet when Jesse (Danny McBride), Kelvin (Adam DeVine) and Judy (Edi Patterson) arrive and escapes. Lyle and his associates then burn down the cabin, and he hides his involvement by murdering his associates and leaving their bodies to be consumed in the flame.

=== Present day ===
Jesse and Amber (Cassidy Freeman) visit Gideon (Skyler Gisondo) at his film set to invite him to the inauguration of Zion's Landing, which he agrees to attend. Lyle visits his father Buddy (John Amos), whom he and his wife had put away in a home in order to take over the ministry. The couple invite Buddy to attend the opening of Zion's Landing as well as give him a permanent suite, but Buddy mentions how Lyle is not ready to be head pastor, causing the couple to storm. Lyle also meets with the Cycle Ninjas, revealing that he was the person who hired them to attack Eli. The assassins demand their payment, but Lyle refuses saying he has raised them at his orphanage, which is sufficient. At Zion's Landing, Jesse eventually finds that Lyle conspired against other televangelists, and Lyle confesses to having burned Block's cabin and sending the Cycle Ninjas to kill Eli (John Goodman) for blocking Jesse's investment. This leads to a fight at the beach where Jesse knocks him unconscious. Eli is also notified by Junior (Eric Roberts) that the assassins were from Texas, realizing Lyle was involved.

Billy (Walton Goggins) also attends the ceremony, hoping to reconcile with Tiffany (Valyn Hall). Tiffany later goes to a port-a-potty, where she gives birth to their baby. The baby falls through the toilet, but is rescued by Baby Billy. Jesse takes Judy, Kelvin, BJ (Tim Baltz) and Amber (Cassidy Freeman) to see Lyle's body, when he suddenly wakes up. Eli also arrives, intending to settle things down with Lyle for his actions. Lindy (Jessica Lowe) arrives and holds the Gemstones at gunpoint, shooting BJ in the leg. She forces the others to retreat into the ocean, allowing her and Lyle to escape Zion's Landing.

One month later, Jesse and Amber continue with their duties in the Gemstone Salvation Center. Billy and Tiffany leave with Lionel to Freeman's Gap. Kelvin and Keefe (Tony Cavalero) have replaced the God Squad with a more mainstream youth fitness program. While Jesse, Kelvin and Judy perform, Eli is informed of the Lissons' location by Martin (Gregory Alan Williams), who has tracked them to Alaska. Martin hires the Cycle Ninjas, who appear at the Lissons' cabin on snowmobiles. Prior to this, the couple had been watching Young Guns, which gives them the idea to duplicate the famous "crate scene". However, this ends disatrously, as the crate shatters on hitting the ground and Lindy is shot immediately. Lyle flees into the tundra, where the Ninjas decide not to shoot him. By next morning, Lyle has frozen to death and his corpse is eaten by wolves. The final scene shows Zion's Landing open for business, now solely owned by the Gemstones.

== Production ==
=== Development ===
In December 2021, HBO confirmed that the episode would be titled "I Will Tell of All Your Deeds", and that it would be written by series creator Danny McBride, executive producer John Carcieri, and executive producer Jeff Fradley, and directed by executive producer David Gordon Green. This was McBride's eighteenth writing credit, Carcieri's tenth writing credit, Fradley's ninth writing credit, and Hill's eighth directing credit.

== Reception ==
=== Viewers ===
In its original American broadcast, "I Will Tell of All Your Deeds" was seen by an estimated 0.402 million household viewers with a 0.1 in the 18-49 demographics. This means that 0.1 percent of all households with televisions watched the episode. This was a 32% increase in viewership from the previous episode, which was watched by 0.304 million household viewers with a 0.1 in the 18-49 demographics.

=== Critical reviews ===
"I Will Tell of All Your Deeds" received extremely positive reviews from critics. Mike Vanderbilt of The A.V. Club gave the episode a "B" grade and wrote, "While it is nice to see happy endings and newfound maturity for the Gemstones, I can't imagine it will hold for long. It'll be interesting to see if they're up to their old tricks next year."

Scott Tobias of Vulture gave the episode a perfect 5 star rating out of 5 and wrote, "The finale also underlines how cleverly the show is plotted — which, along with its cinematic flair, isn't necessarily expected of a raunchy comedy. All the questions left dangling by the scene outside Thaniel Block's cabin are answered." Breeze Riley of Telltale TV gave the episode a 4.5 star rating out of 5 and wrote, "Whether it's Judy tearfully saying goodbye to Tiffany or Eli sharing a nice moment with Junior at his renovated boxing gym, The Righteous Gemstones manages to imbue real warmth into this hectic finale."

Dylan Roth of The New York Observer wrote, "This episode could easily stand as a series finale, but The Righteous Gemstones has been renewed for a third season, and creator Danny McBride sees this saga going on indefinitely. What will these corrupt but lovable huxters learn next year? God only knows." James Preston Poole of Full Circle Cinema gave the episode a perfect 10 out of 10 rating and wrote, "The Righteous Gemstones quietly became the true must-see show on television. Going to some truly ridiculous places in its sophomore season, it manages to weave in crime, melodrama, and an earnestness that's rare in prestige productions of this scale. Its renewal for a third season was announced in January, and thank god, for The Righteous Gemstones is heaven sent."
