= For I Know the Plans I Have for You =

- The Righteous Gemstones episode
- Episode no.: Season 3 Episode 1
- Directed by: Jody Hill
- Written by: John Carcieri; Danny McBride
- Cinematography by: Paul Daley
- Editing by: Todd Zelin
- Original release date: June 18, 2023
- Running time: 36 minutes

Guest appearances
- Kristen Johnston as May–May Montgomery; Stephen Dorff as Vance Simkins; Iliza Shlesinger as Shay Simkins; Shea Whigham as Dusty Daniels; Emma Shannon as Young Judy Gemstone; J. Gaven Wilde as Young Jesse Gemstone; Tristan Borders as Young Kelvin Gemstone; Mary Hollis Inboden as Mandy; Kelton DuMont as Pontius Gemstone; Gavin Munn as Abraham Gemstone; James DuMont as Chad; Jody Hill as Levi; Troy Anthony Hogan as Matthew; J. Larose as Gregory; Stephen Schneider as Stephen; Sean Whalen as Walker; Gogo Lomo-David as Craig Simkins; Maggie Winters as Taryn

Episode chronology
← Previous "I Will Tell of All Your Deeds"	Next → "But Esau Ran to Meet Him"

"For I Know the Plans I Have for You" is the first episode of the third season of the American dark comedy crime television series The Righteous Gemstones. It is the nineteenth overall episode of the series and was written by executive producer John Carcieri, and series creator Danny McBride, and directed by executive producer Jody Hill. It was released on HBO on June 18, 2023, and also was available on Max on the same date. The episode aired back-to-back with the follow-up episode, "But Esau Ran to Meet Him".

The series follows a family of televangelists and megachurch pastors led by widowed patriarch Eli Gemstone. The main focus is Eli and his immature children, Jesse, Kelvin and Judy, all of whom face challenges in their lives. The series depicts the family's past and scandals, which unleash consequences. In the episode, the children are now trying to lead the church following Eli's semi-retirement, which creates friction.

According to Nielsen Media Research, the episode was seen by an estimated 0.238 million household viewers and gained a 0.06 ratings share among adults aged 18–49. The episode received positive reviews from critics, who praised the new characters, storylines and character development.

== Plot ==
=== Flashback ===
At the Rogers County Fair in 2000, the Gemstones host a monster truck event. A young Jesse (J. Gaven Wilde) serves as a presenter, although Aimee-Leigh (Jennifer Nettles) opposes being part of it. While smoking near a barn, Aimee-Leigh is confronted by an old friend, May–May Montgomery (Kristen Johnston), who accuses her of faking her personality on camera. May–May chases her through the fair to attack her, until she is hit by a car.

=== Present day ===
Eli (John Goodman) has semi-retired from the church services, joining a new society, The Cape and Pistol Society, to relax. Jesse (Danny McBride) has helped in taking over Zion's Landing, including firing their driver for leaking information to the media. Judy (Edi Patterson) is coming off a tour, but has no time left for BJ (Tim Baltz). Kelvin (Adam DeVine) has formed a new squad with Keefe (Tony Cavalero), called "Smut Busters", which raids sex shops.

Martin (Gregory Alan Williams) informs the Gemstones that the church's attendance has declined since Eli's semi-retirement, and one of their benefactors, stock car racing driver Dusty Daniels (Shea Whigham), has cut ties with them. They visit him at the raceway, where he reiterates that he does not trusts them in leading the church. Dusty has gotten in business with their fellow competitors, the Simkins. The Simkins are led by Vance (Stephen Dorff), his sister Shay (Iliza Shlesinger) and their adoptive brother Craig (Gogo Lomo-David). Dusty decides to have them test their loyalty by competing in a race. Jesse competes with Vance, and loses after his car struggles to start and runs off the raceway

During a book signing, Eli is approached by an older May–May, who needs his help. Eli refuses to speak to her and has security take her out of the signing. Jesse feels he is unable to lead the church, and feels frustration that Amber (Cassidy Freeman) spends more helping other couples before helping their own marriage. He apologizes to Kelvin for previously insulting him, asking for help in getting Dusty back. They visit Judy during a rehearsal, discovering that she has an affair with one of the crew members, Stephen (Stephen Schneider). They fire Stephen and convince her to help them. Later, Jesse's crew brutally attacks Vance in a parking lot. Eli reconsiders his position and decides to visit May–May at her old church, agreeing to help her, revealing that she is his younger sister.

== Production ==
=== Development ===
The episode was written by executive producer John Carcieri and series creator Danny McBride, and directed by executive producer David Gordon Green. This was Carcieri's eleventh writing credit, McBride's nineteenth writing credit, and Hill's ninth directing credit.

=== Casting ===
In May 2022, it was reported that Stephen Dorff, Shea Whigham, Stephen Schneider, and Iliza Shlesinger would join the series in recurring roles. The following month, Kristen Johnston was also announced to join the series.

== Reception ==
=== Viewers ===
In its original American broadcast, "For I Know the Plans I Have for You" was seen by an estimated 0.238 million household viewers with a 0.06 in the 18-49 demographics. This means that 0.06 percent of all households with televisions watched the episode. This was a 41% decrease in viewership from the previous episode, which was watched by 0.402 million household viewers with a 0.1 in the 18-49 demographics.

=== Critical reviews ===
"For I Know the Plans I Have for You" received positive reviews from critics. Matt Schimkowitz of The A.V. Club gave the episode a "B–" grade and wrote, "A reliable laugh machine, the episode spends too much time retreading ground, particularly about our villains of the week, May–May and the Simkins. After last season, in which the show brought its satire and style to another level, separating itself from McBride's other HBO projects, the season three premiere skates by because the jokes and performances are still top-notch."

Scott Tobias of Vulture gave the episode a 4 star rating out of 5 and wrote, "The Righteous Gemstones sets up the Gemstones-Simkins rivalry quite well, including the now-requisite act of violent stupidity that occurs whenever Jesse feels backed into a corner." Breeze Riley of Telltale TV gave the episode a 4.5 star rating out of 5 and wrote, "Season 2 spent its premiere introducing a convoluted plot of murder and cover-up, while Season 3 chooses to go a much simpler route. With the three siblings jockeying for power within the church, there’s enough going on with them to provide plenty of tension and humor."
