= Mercy (2026 film) =

Film by Timur Bekmambetov

- Theatrical release poster
- Directed by: Timur Bekmambetov
- Written by: Marco van Belle
- Produced by: Charles Roven; Robert Amidon; Timur Bekmambetov; Majd Nassif
- Starring: Chris Pratt; Rebecca Ferguson; Kali Reis; Annabelle Wallis; Chris Sullivan; Kylie Rogers
- Cinematography: Khalid Mohtaseb
- Edited by: Austin Keeling; Lam T. Nguyen; Dody Dorn
- Music by: Ramin Djawadi
- Production companies: Amazon MGM Studios; Atlas Entertainment; Bazelevs
- Distributed by: Amazon MGM Studios (Note: Released through the Metro-Goldwyn-Mayer banner) (United States and Canada); Sony Pictures Releasing International (International)
- Release dates: January 19, 2026 (Regal Cinemas); January 23, 2026 (United States)
- Running time: 100 minutes
- Country: United States
- Language: English
- Budget: $60 million
- Box office: $54.7 million

Mercy is a 2026 American science fiction thriller film written by Marco van Belle, directed by Timur Bekmambetov, and starring Chris Pratt and Rebecca Ferguson. The plot involves a detective (Pratt), who is accused of murdering his wife, and must prove his innocence within 90 minutes to an artificial intelligence judge (Ferguson) or be executed. The film also stars Kali Reis, Annabelle Wallis, Chris Sullivan, and Kylie Rogers.

Mercy was released in the United States by Amazon MGM Studios and internationally by Sony Pictures Releasing International on January 23, 2026. The film was underperformed at the box-office after it's grossed $54.7 million worldwide against a $60 million budget. The film received negative reviews from critics.

== Plot ==
In 2029 Los Angeles, the Mercy Capital Court responds to a surge in crime by using artificial intelligence (AI) judges to try defendants for violent offenses. To assemble evidence, all devices are also registered to the municipal cloud to allow the AI judge to pass judgement. The AI judge also gives the defendants all available resources to find and provide all the evidence needed to prove their innocence in 90 minutes, or be executed via a sonic blast.

Los Angeles Police Department Detective Christopher "Chris" Raven, a strong proponent of the court, is strapped to a chair, put on trial for his wife Nicole's murder, and is given 90 minutes to persuade the AI judge of his innocence. Presiding over his case is the AI Judge Maddox. All the evidence points to Chris having killed his wife, as her blood was found on his clothing and doorbell camera footage places him at their home shortly before her murder. Chris's guilt probability is 97.5%, which qualifies him for execution unless his evidence lowers it to 92% for reasonable doubt and 80% for a Mercy Trial. Since AIs are not allowed to take a human life, the chair is set on a 90 minute timer not controlled by the AI, and it is the defendant’s responsibility to lower their score and this allows the AI to unlock the chair before the timer runs out.

Via Maddox's unrestricted access and abilities, Chris learns that Nicole was seeing another man, Patrick Burke. Chris's partner Jacqueline "Jaq" Diallo finds Patrick who confides that Nicole felt unable to communicate her troubles to Chris about work. Her work email records show reports of missing chemicals. Recalling hosting a work barbecue with Nicole, Chris reviews footage to better identify her co-workers.

While looking for evidence, Chris confronts his relapse in sobriety following the murder of his former partner, Ray Vale, and regrets not shooting the suspect who was later acquitted. Relapsing into alcoholism led to Chris's aggression toward Nicole, and she began to consider a divorce.

Maddox shows Chris records of one co-worker, Holt Charles, who had financial issues and had discussed the chemical disappearance with Robert "Rob" Nelson, Chris's sobriety sponsor. Suspecting Holt may have killed Nicole, Chris tries to contact Rob. Holt instead answers the phone and he explains that Rob is responsible for the missing chemicals. Chris reviews his daughter Britt's social media posts, which reveal that a stranger had been hiding in their basement since the barbecue. His neighbor's security cameras display a rustling in the bushes, and Rob is seen exiting the neighbor's trunk in parking lot surveillance footage.

Chris sends Jaq to Rob's house, warning her and her team that he might be armed. The SWAT team arrive at Rob's house, finding it empty, but uncover detailed plans in the shed to craft a bomb. Maddox discovers that Rob's brother, David Webb, who was separated from him after Rob was adopted and given a new name, was the first person Mercy Court executed for murder. Chris realizes that Rob is orchestrating revenge against him and the Court. Chris is officially acquitted for the murder, but refuses to end the trial to exploit Maddox's unrestricted access. He tries to contact Britt, but footage from her grandparents' front door shows Rob kidnapping her and taking her into a stolen semi-truck. A bomb goes off in the shed killing most of the SWAT team.

Jaq pursues Rob, who is transporting explosives toward Mercy Court to destroy the building with Chris inside. The police divert Rob away from Mercy Court, and Jaq, assuming command, orders the task force to blow up the truck. Chris pleads with Jaq but she refuses to yield to him. The bomb fails to detonate and Jaq attempts to shoot Rob directly. Rob arrives at Mercy Court, crashing into the building and causing a network glitch that requires a system reset. Maddox reboots in time to release Chris from the chair before the trial ends with his execution.

Chris confronts Rob, working with Maddox to distract Rob by having Mercy Court reopen David Webb’s case and demanding Rob to submit his new evidence immediately. Chris then disarms Rob as he speaks and wants to kill him, but is talked down by Britt. Jaq arrives and shoots Rob. Rob provides new evidence that he was on the phone with David when the murder took place, but the police would not listen. Maddox confirms the call's timing and location which placed the phone away from the crime scene. Then Maddox retrieved footage that showed Jaq retrieving that phone from David, removing it from evidence, and dumping it in the river. Jaq explains she wanted to ensure that David was found guilty in the first judgement issued by an AI court to prove the system worked. Jaq and Rob are both taken into custody while Britt reconciles with Chris, whose case is formally dismissed. Maddox and Chris admit mistakes were made by humans and AI and they must learn from their mistakes.

== Cast ==
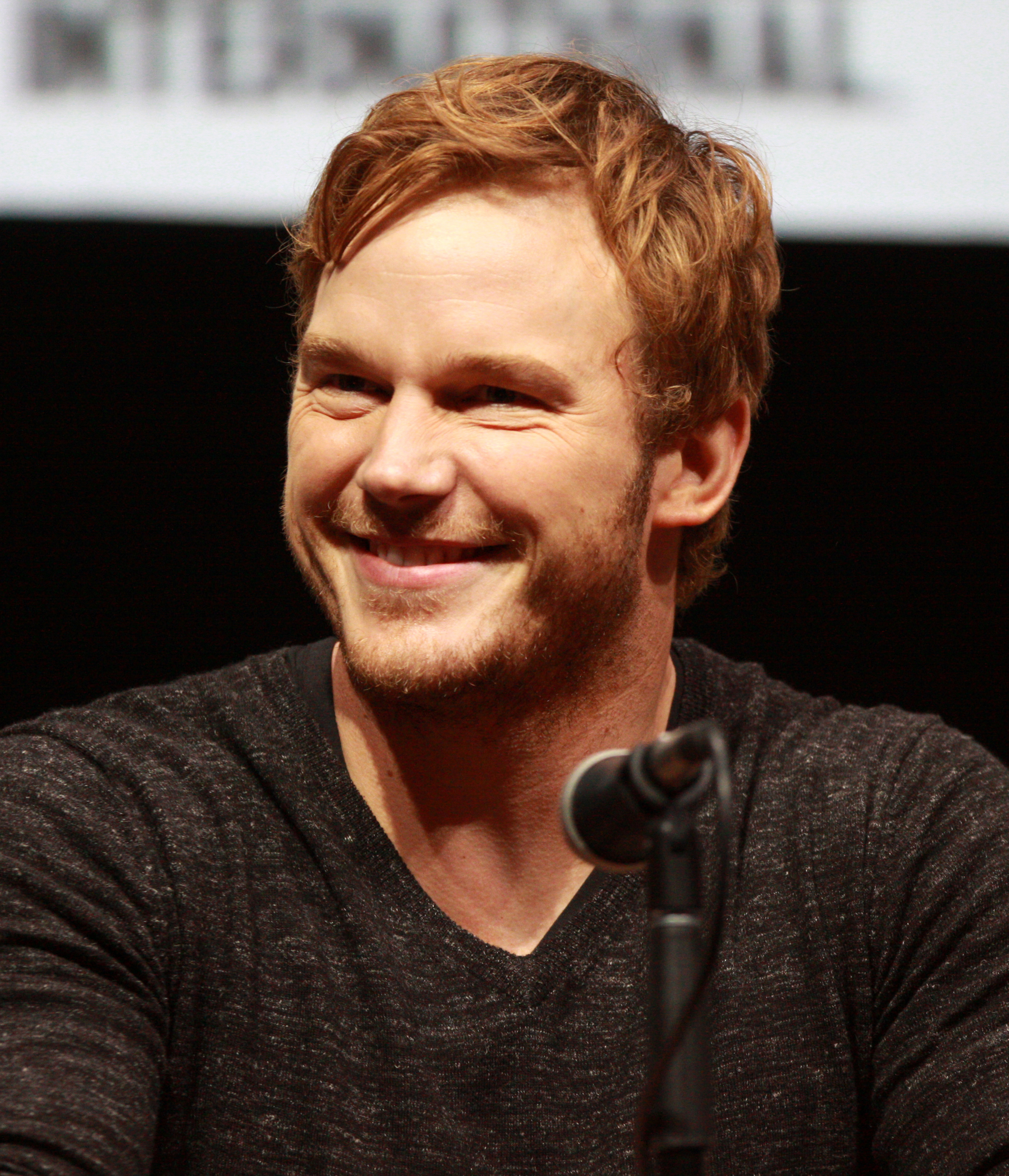
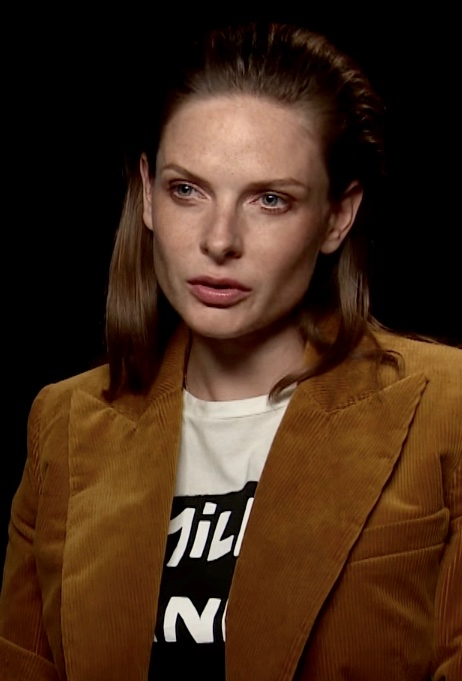
Chris Pratt and Rebecca Ferguson star in the film.
- Chris Pratt as Det. Christopher "Chris" Raven, an LAPD officer who is on trial for the murder of his wife
- Rebecca Ferguson as Judge Maddox, an AI who is part of the Mercy program
- Kali Reis as Jacqueline "Jaq" Diallo, Chris's police partner
- Annabelle Wallis as Nicole Raven, Chris's late wife
- Chris Sullivan as Robert "Rob" Nelson, Chris's AA sponsor and Nicole's co-worker
- Kylie Rogers as Britt Raven, Chris's daughter
- Kenneth Choi as Ray Vale, Chris's late partner
- Rafi Gavron as Holt Charles, a co-worker of Nicole
- Jeff Pierre as Patrick Burke, a man Nicole was seeing before she died
- Tom Rezvan as a governor

== Production ==
It was announced in January 2024 that a science fiction thriller film entitled Mercy was being made for Amazon MGM Studios with Chris Pratt starring, directed by Timur Bekmambetov from a script by Marco Van Belle and produced by Charles Roven, Robert Amidon, Bekmambetov, and Majd Nassif.

In March, Rebecca Ferguson and Annabelle Wallis joined the cast in undisclosed roles. In April, Kali Reis, Rafi Gavron, Chris Sullivan, Kenneth Choi, and Kylie Rogers joined the cast. In May, Jeff Pierre joined the cast of the film.

Principal photography began on April 18, 2024, in Los Angeles, with Khalid Mohtaseb serving as the cinematographer. Pratt suffered an ankle injury on day four of filming, posting a photo of a swollen ankle on his Instagram page. Filming wrapped on May 23, 2024.

=== Music ===
Ramin Djawadi was revealed to have composed the score in January 2026.

== Release ==
Mercy was shown early for patrons of AMC Theatres and Regal Cinemas on January 19, 2026, as part of their Screen Unseen and Monday Mystery Movie programs, respectively. This made it the first IMAX film to be released via the programs.

Mercy was released in the United States on January 23, 2026, in 3D and IMAX, having previously been due for release on August 15, 2025. The film was released on digital on February 17, 2026, and on DVD, Blu-ray, and Ultra HD Blu-ray on April 7, 2026 by Alliance Entertainment and MGM Home Entertainment.

== Reception ==
=== Box office ===
As of March 1, 2026, Mercy has grossed $24.4 million in the United States and Canada, and $29.9 million in other territories, for a worldwide total of $54.3 million. In the United States and Canada, Mercy went on to debut to $12.6 million, becoming the first film to dethrone Avatar: Fire and Ash after five weeks. Its total was affected by the January 2026 North American winter storm that closed about 400 theaters.

=== Critical response ===
Metacritic review
breakdown (unweighted)

Positive
4 (11%)
Mixed
16 (46%)
Negative
15 (43%)

On the review aggregator website Rotten Tomatoes, 24% of 181 critics' reviews are positive, with an average rating of 4.3/10. The website's consensus reads: "Constricting its two stars inside an airless presentation of a clunky techno-thriller premise, Mercy is tedious enough to make you cry uncle." Metacritic, which uses a weighted average, assigned the film a score of 34 out of 100, based on 35 critics, indicating "generally unfavorable" reviews. Audiences polled by CinemaScore gave the film an average grade of "B−" on an A+ to F scale.

In a one out of five stars review, Clarisse Loughrey of The Independent called it "a baffling piece of work that happily swipes the mood and aesthetics of Hollywood's police state dystopias (Minority Report, RoboCop, Blade Runner, etc), while presenting such horrors as an agreeable norm." Radheyan Simonpillai of The Globe and Mail stated that "it's not like the premise isn't intriguing. It's just that the result is the kind of soulless response you'd expect from AI, should it be prompted to make a 'screenlife' version of Minority Report, with some elements from Speed." Peter Howell of the Toronto Star gave it a zero out of four rating, calling it "lazily written, chaotically directed and played out with all the zest of a convenience store security video" and adding, "it lacks not only vision and purpose but the faintest hint of entertainment". Whang Yee Ling of The Straits Times gave it two out of five stars, writing, "It is visually dynamic, sure. But despite a near future that is patently the dystopia of today, the movie gives no serious thought to the ethics of its timely, troubling themes about AI dependency, privacy invasion and state control."

James Mottram of the South China Morning Post gave the film three out of five stars, writing, "The film is tense and, at its best, depicts an eerily familiar world, where drones, body cams, mobile phones and doorbell cameras capture our every move." The Chicago Reader's Kyle Logan called it "a can't-miss event for the subset of viewers fascinated by the screenlife format. For those who aren't part of that group, Mercy will either be a solid, by-the-numbers program with enough formal panache to keep things interesting or a migraine-provoking nightmare."

=== Comparisons with other films ===
Mercy has been compared to other police or science fiction thrillers with similar plot elements, notably Minority Report and also The Fugitive (both with the protagonist wrongfully connected to some mysterious murder), RoboCop and its 2014 remake (the circumstances surrounding the protagonist's initial near-death were manipulated by his superiors), as well as another production by Timur Bekmambetov, Searching (a man searches for his daughter's whereabouts across social media, and she is later revealed to have been charged with a falsified murder), among others.

American movie critic Bob Mondello concluded his comments on Mercy by stating, "[T]he overall effect is secondhand, sort of cinematic junk food — roughly what you'd expect of a Minority Report knockoff that was crafted not by Steven Spielberg, who also directed Lincoln, but by Bekmambetov, who also directed Abraham Lincoln: Vampire Hunter."
