= Michael McGrady =

American actor

- Born: Michael Steven McGrady; Federal Way, Washington, U.S.
- Occupations: Actor, painter
- Years active: 1983–present
- Spouse: Ilka McGrady
- Children: 3; including Hunter

Michael Steven McGrady is an American theater, film and television actor, and painter. He portrayed Tom Matthews in Beyond and voiced and provided the motion capture for Rusty Galloway in the 2011 video game LA Noire.

== Life and work ==
McGrady was born in Federal Way, Washington, to Gloria, a hair salon owner, and George McGrady, an airline mechanic. He attended Federal Way High School and the University of Washington, majoring in Business Administration. He currently splits his time between Southern California and Washington State, with his wife Ilka.

McGrady had planned to become a lawyer and was working at a bank when his sister entered him in a contest for a scholarship to a local acting school. After that McGrady moved to California to pursue his dream of becoming an actor. He was cast in a Cherry Pepsi commercial. He has worked steadily in the industry since. He guest starred in several popular television shows such as 24, Murder She Wrote, CSI: Miami, Leverage and Prison Break. McGrady played Sal Salinger on the TNT drama Southland, which premiered in April 2009. He has also been seen as recurring character Frank Barnes on Showtime's Ray Donovan and appeared as Detective Philip Vanatter on FX's American Crime Story: The People v. O. J. Simpson.

McGrady gave his voice and likeness to Rockstar Games period video game L.A. Noire as Rusty Galloway, and in 2012 he appeared in the film Freelancers. He starred in Low Winter Sun for AMC as Brendan McCann, and as Cy in the independent feature Under The Harvest Moon. He played Detective John Gentile in The Frozen Ground.

== Personal life ==
McGrady is of Irish, British, German and French heritage. At age 19, he overcame stage 3 skin cancer (malignant melanoma), the same disease that had claimed his father’s life a year earlier.

Michael McGrady and his wife Ilka have three children: Michaela, Hunter (a model), and the late Tynan, who died in 2021, aged 23. The family established the Tynan McGrady Foundation, a nonprofit Scholarship and Funding organization for Science, Technology, Engineering and Mathematics (STEM) endeavors.

== Selected filmography ==
Film
Year	Film	Role	Notes
1992	The Babe	Lou Gehrig	
1993	Hocus Pocus	Cop Eddie	
2002	Half Past Dead	Guard Damon J. Kestner	
2008	Keith	Pete Anderson	
2008	Ring of Death	Colson	
2012	The Perfect Family	Frank Cleary	
2012	Freelancers	Robert Jude	
2013	The Frozen Ground	Vice Det. John Gentile	
2014	Rage	Danny Doherty	
Television
Year	Title	Role	Notes
1990	Quantum Leap	Oscar	1 episode
2002–2003	24	Officer Raymond Brown	4 episodes
2005	Criminal Minds	Sheriff John Bridges	1 episode
2006–2008	Day Break	Shadow Agent Buchalter	Main cast
2007	Grey's Anatomy	Stanley Singer	1 episode
2008	Leverage	Sheriff Hastings	1 episode
2009	The Mentalist	Coach Dieter	1 episode
2009–2011	Southland	Detective Daniel "Sal" Salinger	Main cast
2010	Lie to Me	Gil Wallace	1 episode
2010	CSI: Miami	Larry Chandler	1 episode
2011	The Protector	J.R. Daldrop	1 episode
2012	Castle	Brian Reilly	1 episode
2013	Low Winter Sun	Brendan McCann	Recurring role
2013	Mob City	Chief Clemance Horall	Recurring role
2013–2017	Ray Donovan	Frank Barnes	Recurring role (seasons 1–5)
2014	How to Get Away with Murder	AUSA Hobbs	1 episode
2015	Battle Creek	Jack Stanton	1 episode
2016	The People v. O. J. Simpson: American Crime Story	Detective Philip Vannatter	Recurring role
2016–2017	Chance	Sanford Pringle	Recurring role
2017–2018	Beyond	Tom Matthews	Main cast
2018	Agents of S.H.I.E.L.D.	Samuel Voss	2 episodes
2018–2019	SEAL Team	Captain Harrington	Recurring role (season 2)
2019	FBI	Tom Brennan	1 episode
2022	S.W.A.T.	Agent Phil Kaminski	1 episode
2026	Paradise	Geiger	Recurring role
Video Games
Year	Title	Role	Notes
2009	Prototype	Additional Voices	
2011	L.A. Noire	Rusty Galloway	
