= Jonathan Whitesell =

Canadian actor

- Born: Jonathan Rae Whitesell; 1991/1992 (age 34–35); Vancouver Island, Canada
- Education: Capilano University
- Occupation: Actor
- Years active: 2015–present
- Known for: Beyond; The 100; Chilling Adventures of Sabrina

Jonathan Rae Whitesell (born 1991 or 1992) is a Canadian actor known for his role as Luke Matthews in the Freeform 2017 science fiction drama Beyond. He later played several high-profile recurring roles as Bryan and Kurtz respectively in The CW series The 100 and Riverdale, as well as Robin Goodfellow in the Netflix supernatural horror series Chilling Adventures of Sabrina.

Whitesell has also starred in several films, most notably The Kill Team (2019).

== Early life ==
Whiteshell was born in 1991 or 1992 and grew up in Duncan, British Columbia. After graduating high school, Whitesell joined the military, following in the footsteps of his father, who was already enrolled, and his grandfather, who was a police officer. Although he had enjoyed acting since he was eight years old, he did not see it as a lucrative career, and it was not until he went through a particularly difficult period in his life that Whitesell decided to try and focus on something he loved and registered for the acting program at Capilano University.

== Career ==
Between 2016 and 2017, Whitesell appeared in a recurring role as Bryan on the third and fourth seasons of The CW's dystopian science fiction series The 100. Bryan is introduced as the boyfriend of established character Nathan Miller. On the significance of his role, he explained "[Bryan and Miller] were two kind of almost alpha males from each station and the relationship was not based in stereotype and it's so cool being in this universe, sexuality isn't such a pertinent thing". He also added that playing an LGBT character was an "honour". Discussing his guest role as Hercules in "Labor of Love", the thirteenth episode of the fifth season of ABC fantasy drama Once Upon a Time, Whitsell admitted that he was "stoked" the moment he read the script and thought his story arc was "refreshing" and "interesting", adding that he liked "the new take" on the character as it was very different from how he was portrayed in the 1997 Disney film. He also praised director Billy Gierhart and actress Ginnifer Goodwin for their support on set.

In 2016, Witesell was cast as a series regular on the Freeform series Beyond. Filming for the first season began on April 5, 2016. Describing the casting process, he explained that he "originally auditioned for the role of Holden. It was a bit of a whirlwind experience that started with a taping, three auditions and a test over the span of a couple of months. It was a couple of weeks after my test I found out I didn't get the part. It was tough to digest the news, but I was thrilled about the whole experience nonetheless. It wasn't until about three weeks later that I got the call saying that they were going to offer me the role of Luke instead! The whole process took about three months, and I was very emotionally invested, so when I got the news it was mind blowing". The show was cancelled after its second season.

Whitesell's casting in Dan Krauss' war film The Kill Team was announced on November 1, 2017, following a six- week shoot that concluded in Spain on October 20, 2017. The film premiered at the Tribeca Film Festival on April 27, 2019, before being theatrically released by A24 on October 25 that same year.

In late 2019, Whitesell was cast in the third season of Netflix's Chilling Adventures of Sabrina. Of his role, Deadline reported that Whitesell would "play Robin, a handsome young man with an 'elfish' quality to him" and that, though the character is "caring and sweet", he was also a "mischief maker" and "perhaps something more dangerous" who would develop feelings for regular cast member Lachlan Watson's Theo.

== Personal life ==
Whitesell enjoys drawing, painting, photography and directing short films. He also enjoys playing tabletop Dungeons & Dragons as well as the video games Halo and Overwatch and is a fan of Game of Thrones and Star Wars. He has an interest in computer hardware and built his own PC.

== Filmography ==
=== Film ===
Year	Title	Role	Notes
2015	The Unspoken	Logan	
2016	A.R.C.H.I.E.	Aaron	
2017	Never Steady, Never Still	Danny	
2017	Young George and the Dragon	Young George (voice)	
2018	Hold the Dark	Arnie	
2018	Bad Times at the El Royale	Chris "Flicker" Grimes	
2019	The Kill Team	Coombs	
2022	Bones of Crows	Thomas Miller	
2022	Young George 2 No Dragons Allowed!	Young George (voice)	
2025	Valiant One	Jonah Ross	
2025	Influencers		

=== Television ===
Year	Title	Role	Notes
2015	The Hollow	Alex	Television film
2015	iZombie	Chad Wolcoff	Episode: "Zombie Bro"
2015	Proof	Charlie Maynard	Episode: "Memento Vivere"
2015	Ties That Bind	Michael Gibbons	Episode: "Legacy"
2016	Once Upon a Time	Hercules	Episode: "Labor of Love"
2016	The X-Files	Kyle Gilligan	Episode: "Founder's Mutation"
2016–2017	The 100	Bryan	Recurring role (seasons 3–4)
2016–2018	Beyond	Luke Matthews	Main role
2017	Beyblade Burst	Quon Limon (voice)	English dub; recurring role (season 1)
2018	Littlest Pet Shop: A World of Our Own	Mac Hedgyhog	Episode: "All Decked Out"
2019	Project Blue Book	Wells	Episode: "War Games"
2019	Riverdale	Kurtz	Recurring role (season 3)
2019	The Twilight Zone	Casey Donlin	Episode: "Six Degrees of Freedom"
2020	Chilling Adventures of Sabrina	Robin Goodfellow	Recurring role (parts 3 and 4)
2023	Bones of Crows: The Series	Thomas Miller	Miniseries
2023	Boy in the Walls	Joe	Television film
2024–2026	Allegiance	Ricochet88	3 episodes
2024	Murder in a Small Town	Riley Erlandson	Episode: "The Suspect"
2025	Tracker	Paul James Hamilton	Episode: "Monster"
2025	Happy Face	Nico	2 episodes
2025	Untamed	Teddy Redwine	Miniseries
2026	Wild Cards	Wade McMiller	Episode: "Return of the Corkscrew Killer"
