= Jeff Pierre =

American actor

- Born: May 21, 1986 (age 40); Boston, Massachusetts, U.S.
- Occupation: Actor
- Years active: 2010–present
- Known for: Shameless; Beyond; Walker

Jeff Pierre (born May 21, 1986) is an American actor, known for his roles in Shameless and Walker.

== Career ==
In 2016 he appeared in War Dogs alongside Jonah Hill and Miles Teller.

Pierre recurred on Shameless in 2016. From 2017 to 2018 he played Jeff McArdle on Beyond. He appeared as Prince Naveen on ABC's Once Upon a Time in 2018 alongside Mekia Cox as Princess Tiana. He appeared in two episodes of The Rookie in 2020.

In 2019, he played Sgt. Johnson in Jarhead: Law of Return, the fourth installment of the Jarhead series.

In 2021, Pierre joined the cast of The CW drama Walker as Texas Ranger Trey Barnett. He played the role throughout the series' run until its cancellation in 2024.

In 2024, it was announced that Pierre had joined the science-fiction film Mercy starring Chris Pratt and Rebecca Ferguson.

In 2025, Pierre also joined the cast of the Netflix series Nemesis alongside Sophina Brown and Cedric Joe.

== Filmography ==
=== Film ===
Year	Title	Role	Notes
2010	Eyes to See		Short
2012	Hollow Tags	Kirk	Short
2014	Mill Street	Tyreeq	Short
2015	Happily Ever After	Derek	Short
2015	Run	Tyrese	Short
2015	My Brothers Keeper	Chuck	Short
2016	War Dogs	Money room soldier	
2019	Jarhead: Law of Return	Sgt. Johnson	
2026	Mercy	Patrick Burke	

=== Television ===
Year	Title	Role	Notes
2014	CSI: Crime Scene Investigation	Officer Dunn	Episode: "The Fallen"
2014	Glee	A Fan	Episode:"The Untitled Rachel Berry Project"
2014	Drumline: A New Beat	Tyree	TV Movie
2014	Anger Management	Dave Loftus	Episode: "Charlie & the 100th episode"
2016	Shameless	Caleb Daniels	10 episodes
2017	Workaholics	Skyler	Episode: "Termidate"
2018	Tomboy	Sam	TV Movie
2017–2018	Beyond	Jeff McArdle	19 episodes
2018	Once Upon a Time	Naveen/Drew	6 episodes
2018	So Close	Marcus	TV Movie
2018	NCIS	Lew Nolte	Episode: "Tailing Angie"
2019	The Affair	Jordan	Episode: "#5.4"
2019	9-1-1	Emmett Washington	Episode:" Athena Begins"
2020	The Rookie	Emmett Lang	2 episodes
2020	Tacoma FD	Captain Tad	2 episodes
2021	Love in 2020	Chad	4 episodes
2023	Christmas of yes	Niko	TV Movie
2021–2024	Walker	Trey Barnett	Main, 69 episodes
2024	Fire Country	Elijah Edwards	Episode: "Edgewater's About to Get Real Cozy"
2026	Nemesis	Malik Jacobs	Main
