= Hunter McGrady =

American plus-size model (born 1993)

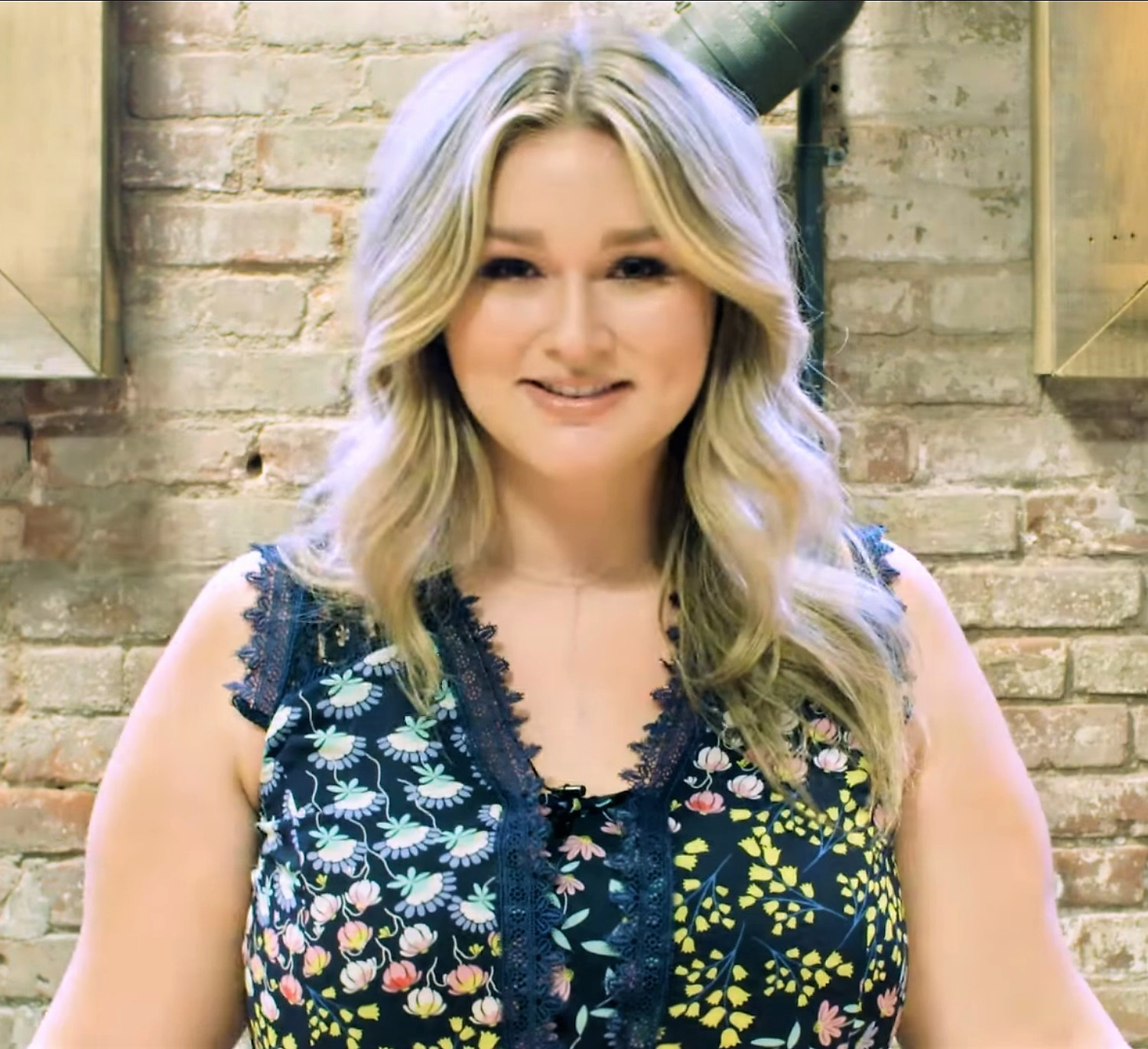
- McGrady on Cntrl+Alt+Delete in 2018
- Born: May 4, 1993 (age 33); Los Angeles, California, U.S.
- Spouse: Brian Keys
- Children: 2
- Father: Michael McGrady
- Relatives: Michaela McGrady (sister)
- Modeling information
- Height: 1.80 m (5 ft 11 in)
- Hair color: Blonde
- Eye color: Hazel
- Agency: Digital Brand Architects (Los Angeles)

Hunter Sienna McGrady (born May 4, 1993) is an American plus-size model. She started plus-size modelling when she was 19 years old after being signed with Wilhelmina. She is currently signed to One Management and was recently featured on the cover of Sports illustrated Swimsuit’s 2024 60th Anniversary Legends issue.

== Early life and education ==
McGrady was born in Los Angeles, to American actor Michael McGrady and model Brynja McGrady. She has an older sister, fellow model Michaela McGrady. The two sisters host the popular podcast titled Model Citizen. Her younger brother Tynan died in a car accident in 2021.

McGrady married advertising executive Brian Keys in 2019. They had their first child together, a son, in 2021. They had their second child together, a daughter, in 2023.

== Career ==
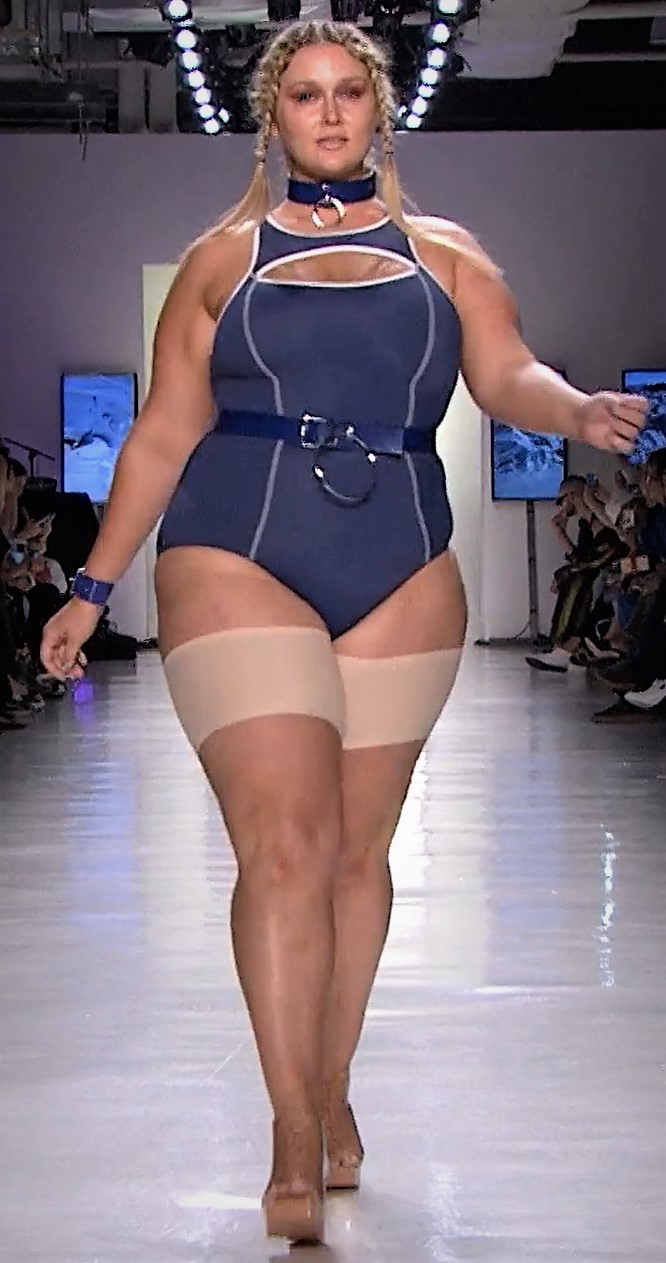
McGrady in the Chromat Spring-Summer 2018 Serenity Collection, New York Fashion Week

McGrady started her career as a straight sized model at age 15. At 19, she decided to start plus size modeling because she could not maintain the 00 standard set by her agency. In 2017, she became the largest model (size 16) to appear in a Sports Illustrated Swimsuit Issue. In 2019, she was the first plus-size model on a cover of The Knot. In 2024 McGrady appeared on the cover of Sports Illustrated for their 60th anniversary Legends issue.

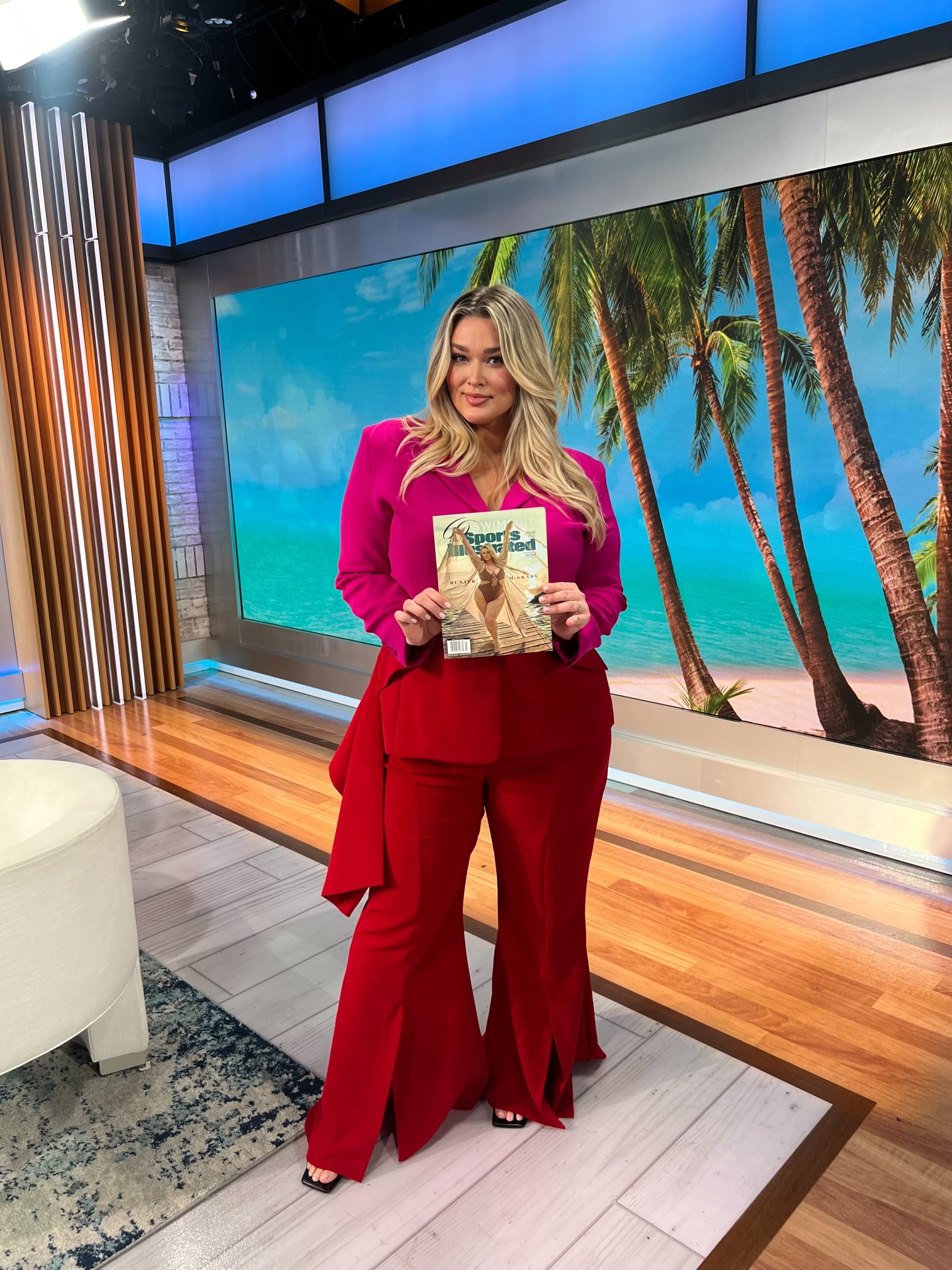
Hunter McGrady posing with her Sports Illustrated Swimsuit cover at a CBS appearance

In 2021 McGrady launched her groundbreaking clothing line All Worthy with QVC which included a size range from XXS to 5X. Speaking with Teen Vogue of her line, McGrady said “I want everybody to feel worthy," she told Teen Vogue. "I want them to feel empowered, amazing, beautiful, comfortable in their skin. I want them to put on these pieces and feel like they can just take on the day and be the best that they can be, and I want people to know that we're all in this together." In 2022 McGrady was featured on the cover of Health Magazine’s Jan/Feb issue.
