= Jay Reeves =

American actor (born 1994)

- Born: June 25, 1994 (age 32); Newark, New Jersey, U.S.
- Occupation: Actor
- Years active: 2014–present

Jay Reeves (born June 25, 1994) is an American actor. He first gained recognition for his recurring role as Shawn Scott on the first season of the CW sports drama television series All American (2018–2019). Reeves then had a supporting role in the action thriller film The Tax Collector (2020).

Reeves had his breakout with his lead role portrayal of college football player Ray McElrathbey in the biographical film Safety (2020). He later had a supporting role in the war drama film The Six Triple Eight (2024).

== Career ==
In September 2018, Reeves was cast in his first notable role as Shawn Scott on the first season of the CW sports drama series All American. In September 2019, he was cast in his first lead role as former Clemson Tigers football player Ray McElrathbey in the Disney+ film Safety. The film was released in December 2020. In March 2021, Reeves signed with talent agency UTA.

In January 2023, Reeves was cast in the war drama film The Six Triple Eight, which was released in December 2024. In April 2025, he was cast in a lead role in the Tyler Perry-directed Netflix film Doing Life. During the same month, Reeves was cast in a recurring role in the Netflix drama series Nemesis.

== Filmography ==
|- |Pickleballers |DJ |Television film |} |- | rowspan="5" |2026 |”Doing Life” | Carousel

=== Television ===
| Year | Title | Role | Notes |
|---|---|---|---|
| 2014 | Jewvangelist | Skater Kid | Episode: "Leah Goes to the Mormons" |
| 2014 | Newsreaders | Len Dorchie | Episode: "Headless Football Player; Identity Thief" |
| 2016 | Crowded | Martin | Episode: "Nothing as It Seems" |
| 2018 | K.C. Undercover | Jordan | Episode: "The Gammy Files" |
| 2018–2019; 2024 | All American | Shawn Scott | 8 episodes |
| 2019 | A Girl Named Jo | Andre | 6 episodes |
| 2026 | Marshals | Roner | Episode: "On Thin Ice" |
| 2026 | Nemesis | Jamel Brinkley | 5 episodes |
| 2026 | Doing Life | Carousel White | |
