= Miles Burris =

American football player and actor (born 1988)

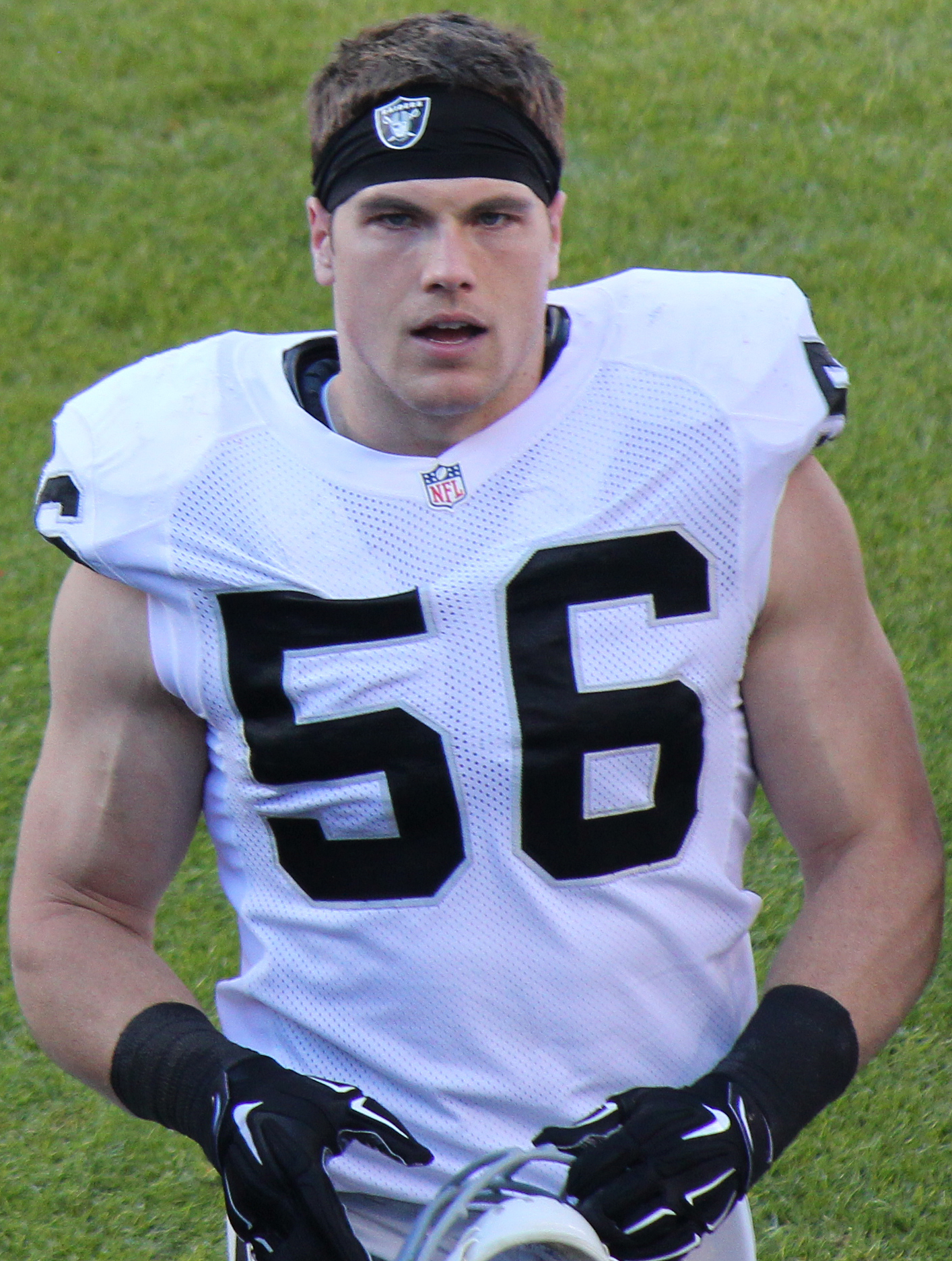
- Burris in 2014

No. 56
- Position: Linebacker

Personal information
- Born: June 27, 1988 (age 38); Sacramento, California, U.S.
- Listed height: 6 ft 2 in (1.88 m)
- Listed weight: 235 lb (107 kg)

Career information
- High school: Granite Bay (CA)
- College: San Diego State
- NFL draft: 2012: 4th round, 129th overall pick

Career history
- Oakland Raiders (2012–2014)

Awards and highlights
- 2× First-team All-MWC (2010, 2011); Poinsettia Bowl champion (2010)

Career NFL statistics
- Total tackles: 209
- Sacks: 1.5
- Fumble recoveries: 1
- Interceptions: 1
- Stats at Pro Football Reference

Miles James Burris (born June 27, 1988) is an American actor and former professional football linebacker who played for the Oakland Raiders from 2012 to 2014. He played college football at San Diego State and was selected in the fourth round of the 2012 NFL draft by the Oakland Raiders. In his rookie season, Burris immediately became a regular part of the Raiders' defense, starting all but one game that season. He has also worked as an actor, appearing in the Disney+ film Safety as well as HBO’s The Righteous Gemstones and the Netflix series Lucifer.

== Early life and college ==
Born in Orangevale, California, Burris graduated from Granite Bay High School of Granite Bay, California in 2007. At Granite Bay, he was twice named All-Metro League and was Granite Bay’s defensive player of the year following both his junior and senior seasons.

Burris was a two-time All-Mountain West Conference first-team selection at San Diego State and led the Aztecs in tackles as a senior, posting 78 stops, including 46 solo tackles, and 19.5 tackles for loss. Burris added eight sacks and three fumble recoveries that same season. He had 9.5 sacks as a junior, which ranked as the seventh-highest single-season total in program history. He also led the team with 80 tackles and was named the 2010 San Diego State Student-Athlete of the Year.

== Professional career ==
Pre-draft measurables
| Height | Weight | Arm length | Hand span | Wingspan | 40-yard dash | 10-yard split | 20-yard split | 20-yard shuttle | Three-cone drill | Vertical jump | Broad jump | Bench press |
|---|---|---|---|---|---|---|---|---|---|---|---|---|
| 6 ft 2 1/8 in (1.88 m) | 246 lb (112 kg) | 31 7/8 in (0.81 m) | 9 7/8 in (0.25 m) | 6 ft 5 3/4 in (1.97 m) | 4.67 s | 1.61 s | 2.67 s | 4.20 s | 6.81 s | 37.5 in (0.95 m) | 10 ft 1 in (3.07 m) | 31 reps |
Times for 10-yard and 20-yard splits, 40-yard dash, 20-yard shuttle, and 3-cone drill are from Pro Day at San Diego State on March 21, 2012. Times for the bench press, vertical jump, and broad jump are from the 2012 NFL Scouting Combine.

Based on his NFL Scouting Combine and Pro Day results, NFL Draft Scout projected Burris to be a fifth-round NFL Draft selection. In the 2012 NFL draft, the Oakland Raiders selected Burris in the fourth round as the 129th overall pick. As a rookie, Burris played all 16 games and started 15 and had 62 unassisted tackles, 34 assisted, 1.5 sacks, 3 passes deflected, and one interception. On December 23, Burris intercepted Carolina Panthers quarterback Cam Newton and returned the pick for 7 yards after Philip Wheeler deflected the pass. This interception ended Newton's streak of 176 passes without an interception. Burris was released from the Raiders following the 2015 NFL draft.

== NFL career statistics ==
Legend
| **Bold** | Career high |

| Year | Team | Games | | Tackles | | | | | Interceptions | | | | | Fumbles | | | |
| Year | Team | GP | GS | Cmb | Solo | Ast | Sck | TFL | Int | Yds | TD | Lng | PD | FF | FR | Yds | TD |
|---|---|---|---|---|---|---|---|---|---|---|---|---|---|---|---|---|---|
| 2012 | OAK | **16** | 15 | 96 | 62 | **34** | **1.5** | **5** | **1** | **7** | 0 | **7** | **3** | 0 | 0 | 0 | 0 |
| 2013 | OAK | 6 | 0 | 4 | 3 | 1 | 0.0 | 0 | 0 | 0 | 0 | 0 | 0 | 0 | **1** | 0 | 0 |
| 2014 | OAK | **16** | **16** | **109** | **76** | 33 | 0.0 | 4 | 0 | 0 | 0 | 0 | 1 | 0 | 0 | 0 | 0 |
| Career | | 38 | 31 | 209 | 141 | 68 | 1.5 | 9 | 1 | 7 | 0 | 7 | 4 | 0 | 1 | 0 | 0 |

== Acting career ==
Following numerous injuries, Burris retired from football in 2017 and decided to step into the field of acting, having taken an acting course while attending San Diego State. In 2020, he played a football player named Keller in the Disney+ exclusive film Safety. He also stars as Titus in HBO’s The Righteous Gemstones (Seasons 2) and Jophiel in the Netflix series Lucifer.

== Filmography ==
=== Film ===
| Year | Title | Role | Notes | Ref(s) |
|---|---|---|---|---|
| 2018 | iBOT | Bodyguard | | |
| 2019 | A Death Perspective | Chris Sultan | | |
| 2020 | Safety | Keller | Disney+ film | |
| 2026 | Madden | Phil Villapiano | | |

=== Television ===
| Year | Title | Role | Notes | Ref(s) |
|---|---|---|---|---|
| 2017 | James Blondes | Gala Guest | Episode: "The Gala 00B" | |
| 2017 | A Royal Christmas Ball | Emile | Television film | |
| 2017-2018 | Starwood U | Brendan | | |
| 2018 | Code Black | Logan | Episode: "As Night Comes and I'm Breathing" | |
| 2018 | Teachers | Hunk #1 | Episode: "The Book Challenge" | |
| 2018 | Art Prison | Collector | TV Pilot | |
| 2020 | Single Parents | Jared R. | Episode: "No. Wait. What? Hold on." | |
| 2021 | Lucifer | Jophiel | 2 episodes | |
| 2022 | The Righteous Gemstones | Titus | 5 episodes | |
| 2022-2023 | Young Rock | Hunter Hearst Helmsley | 5 episodes | |
| 2022-2024 | The Really Loud House | Stanley Bunch / Rip Hardcore | 3 episodes | |
| 2023 | The Federation | Mr. USA | | |
