= For Jealousy Is the Rage of a Man =

- The Righteous Gemstones episode
- Episode no.: Season 4 Episode 7
- Directed by: Jonathan Watson
- Written by: Kevin Barnett; Chris Pappas; Danny McBride
- Cinematography by: Paul Daley
- Editing by: Joseph Ettinger
- Original release date: April 20, 2025
- Running time: 38 minutes

Guest appearances
- Michael Rooker as Cobb Milsap; Valyn Hall as Tiffany Freeman; Stephen Dorff as Vance Simkins; Steve Little as Jacob Jones; Megan Mullally as Lori Milsap; Walton Goggins as Baby Billy Freeman; Kelton DuMont as Pontius Gemstone; Gavin Munn as Abraham Gemstone; Kerstin Schulze as Sola; Mike Britt as Reggie Daniels

Episode chronology
← Previous "Interlude IV"	Next → "On Your Belly You Shall Go"

"For Jealousy is the Rage of a Man" is the seventh episode of the fourth season of the American dark comedy crime television series The Righteous Gemstones. It is the 34th overall episode of the series and was written by consulting producer Kevin Barnett, consulting producer Chris Pappas, and series creator Danny McBride, and directed by executive producer Jonathan Watson. It was released on HBO on April 20, 2025, and also was available on Max on the same date.

The series follows a family of televangelists and megachurch pastors led by widowed patriarch Eli Gemstone. The main focus is Eli and his immature children, Jesse, Kelvin and Judy, all of whom face challenges in their lives. The series depicts the family's past and scandals, which unleash consequences. In the episode, Kelvin refuses to leave his treehouse after his humiliating debate, while Eli confronts Cobb, and learns about Lori's past.

According to Nielsen Media Research, the episode was seen by an estimated 0.289 million household viewers and gained a 0.05 ratings share among adults aged 18–49. The episode received generally positive reviews from critics, although Adam DeVine received high praise for his performance in the episode.

== Plot ==
Lori visits Cobb, warning him to stay away from her family. After he does not express fear, he is visited by Eli during one of his performances at the alligator farm. Cobb maintains that he wants nothing to do with her, and shows Eli an ad showing that Lori worked for an escort service, disgusting him. Over dinner, Lori claims Cobb faked the ad, but is angered by Eli investigating her finances and leaves.

After his poor performance during the debate, Kelvin has secluded in his childhood treehouse, refusing to let anyone enter. Unconvinced by the lead actor, Baby Billy asks Jesse and Judy to grant him $2 million to reshoot Teenjus, intending to play the lead character himself, but they refuse. Judy begins to feel jealousy for Dr. Watson, as BJ prefers to hang out and spend time with the monkey, even helping it in a few tasks. After Pontius begins hanging out with skaters and deviating from the church, Gideon tries to get him to join his congregation. When they insult him, Gideon uses his stunt experience to surprise them with his skateboarding skills, convincing them to attend a service.

Jesse and Judy use the jetpacks to access the treehouse, convincing Kelvin that he needs to win to get back at Simkins. Kelvin returns for a last conversation for Top Christ Following Man of the Year, proclaiming that he is made in God's image and that he is proud of who he is. He subsequently leaves the stage, believing the award is meaningless. He is then called back on stage, as he officially won the award. Kelvin returns and celebrates his win with the crowd, while Jesse smiles and insults Simkins.

== Production ==
=== Development ===
The episode was written by consulting producer Kevin Barnett, consulting producer Chris Pappas, and series creator Danny McBride, and directed by executive producer Jonathan Watson. This was Barnett's fifth writing credit, Pappas' fifth writing credit, McBride's 34th writing credit, and Watson's second directing credit.

=== Writing ===
Adam DeVine commented on Kevin's speech during the episode's climax, "That speech was a really big one, and I just wanted it to be clear-eyed and not putting anything on, not a performance. Sometimes Kelvin, or any of the characters, because they're used to speaking in front of a lot of people at church — some of those speeches, it's a little performative. I wanted this to feel more like, this is him saying what he needs to say. And I hope that came across." He added, "He has this deep fear within him that someone or something could just come and take him or expose him. That's why he's so guarded with his secret. It really stuck with him for his entire life. The big speech toward the end of episode 7 was a cathartic release and the releasing of the traumas of his youth. It's beyond the home invasion. For Kelvin to finally come out so publicly, it feels like an amazing release. I was like, Go get ’em, little guy."

== Reception ==
=== Viewers ===
In its original American broadcast, "For Jealousy Is the Rage of a Man" was seen by an estimated 0.289 million household viewers with a 0.05 in the 18-49 demographics. This means that 0.05 percent of all households with televisions watched the episode. This was a slight decrease in viewership from the previous episode, which was watched by 0.294 million household viewers with a 0.08 in the 18-49 demographics.

=== Critical reviews ===
"For Jealousy Is the Rage of a Man" received generally positive reviews from critics. Matt Schimkowitz of The A.V. Club gave the episode a "B–" grade and wrote, "It's a triumphant note to end the episode on, one that's hard to judge without seeing the final two episodes. It's also hard to imagine this win not having a horrible effect on Kelvin. It's an exciting, life-changing, and potentially redemptive achievement, but it depends on what Kelvin will do with the distinction. The Gemstones have done a lot of bad in their day, but the big guy hasn't abandoned them yet. God still has their backs."

Scott Tobias of Vulture gave the episode a 4 star rating out of 5 and wrote, "For voters to give it to him anyway feels like the type of phony Hollywood uplift that's anathema to a series like The Righteous Gemstones, however much it obviously loves these characters. Just Kelvin's decision to be up front about who he is, consequences be damned, would be meaningful enough without the rest of the Evangelical world celebrating him for it."

Robert Pitman of Screen Rant wrote, "The feud between the Gemstones and the Simkins is one of the main arcs in The Righteous Gemstones season 4, with Jesse and Kelvin both having their own reasons to despite Vance Simkins. Luckily, the Gemstones got a major win in The Righteous Gemstones' final season, but the Simkins probably won't take it sitting down." Hawk Ripjaw of TV Obsessive wrote, "I particularly loved that Kelvin finally came out to the world. While I wouldn't have minded much if someone else got it over him, I'm just happy that Simkins didn't get it. It remains to be seen what that smug little rival preacher will get up to next week, but I'm particularly interested in what’s going to happen with Eli, Lori, Cobb, and Lori."
