= I Will Take You by the Hand and Keep You =

- The Righteous Gemstones episode
- Episode no.: Season 3 Episode 8
- Directed by: Jody Hill
- Written by: Scott MacArthur; Danny McBride; Edi Patterson
- Cinematography by: David Canseco
- Editing by: Paul Daley
- Original release date: July 30, 2023
- Running time: 28 minutes

Guest appearances
- Kristen Johnston as May–May Montgomery; Lukas Haas as Chuck Montgomery; Sturgill Simpson as Marshall; Steve Zahn as Peter Montgomery; Walton Goggins as Baby Billy Freeman; Kelton DuMont as Pontius Gemstone; Gavin Munn as Abraham Gemstone; James DuMont as Chad; Jody Hill as Levi; Troy Anthony Hogan as Matthew; J. LaRose as Gregory; Robert Oberst as Karl Montgomery; Mary Hollis Inboden as Mandy; Quincy Dunn-Baker as Dakota; Stephen Louis Grush as Jacob

Episode chronology
← Previous "Burn for Burn, Wound for Wound, Stripe for Stripe"	Next → "Wonders That Cannot Be Fathomed, Miracles That Cannot Be Counted"

"I Will Take You by the Hand and Keep You" is the eighth episode of the third season of the American dark comedy crime television series The Righteous Gemstones. It is the 26th overall episode of the series and was written by Scott MacArthur, series creator Danny McBride, and main cast member Edi Patterson, and directed by executive producer Jody Hill. It was released on HBO on July 30, 2023, and also was available on Max on the same date, airing back-to-back with the follow-up episode, "Wonders That Cannot Be Fathomed, Miracles That Cannot Be Counted".

The series follows a family of televangelists and megachurch pastors led by widowed patriarch Eli Gemstone. The main focus is Eli and his immature children, Jesse, Kelvin and Judy, all of whom face challenges in their lives. The series depicts the family's past and scandals, which unleash consequences. In the episode, Jesse, Kelvin and Judy decide to make a new change in their lives following their kidnapping.

According to Nielsen Media Research, the episode was seen by an estimated 0.227 million household viewers and gained a 0.07 ratings share among adults aged 18–49. The episode received critical acclaim, with critics praising the tone, character development, performances and directing. The kiss between Keefe and Kelvin was also praised by many critics.

== Plot ==
Jesse (Danny McBride), Kelvin (Adam DeVine) and Judy (Edi Patterson) reunite with their families at the hospital. However, they give the cold shoulder to Eli (John Goodman), as he did not pay money for their rescue. In contrast, they appreciate Karl (Robert Oberst) and welcome him in the family.

Forced to take the militia out of the compound, Peter (Steve Zahn) has his authority questioned by some of his men, as they feel he has no plan. This worsens when resources run out and their only mean to get food is by buying in fast-food restaurants. This prompts Peter's henchman, Marshall (Sturgill Simpson), to convince the militiamen to abandon Peter's plan, instead focusing on using the funds for statue keeping. Outnumbered, Peter and Chuck (Lukas Haas) are forced to leave their hideout with the explosives. To get back at them, Peter calls authorities, and the militiamen are arrested when ATF agents find their location.

Jesse decides to return to church, convincing Kelvin and Judy to return and hires Baby Billy (Walton Goggins) as a "spirit guide" for them. When Eli visits them again, they reprimand him for his actions, accusing him of prioritizing money over them or the church. Eli admits caring for money, but affirms that he only did because he wanted the best possible life for them. They brush it off, but Eli leaves happily, content that they are working together. Before performing at the church, Kelvin finally decides to kiss Keefe (Tony Cavalero), to Jesse's and Judy's delight. During this, Peter and Chuck are seen driving the truck with explosives, heading for the church.

== Production ==
=== Development ===
The episode was written by Scott MacArthur, series creator Danny McBride, and main cast member Edi Patterson, and directed by executive producer Jody Hill. This was MacArthur's first writing credit, McBride's 26th writing credit, Patterson's third writing credit, and Hill's 12th directing credit.

=== Writing ===
The episode featured the first kiss between Keefe and Kelvin. The idea was first suggested by actor Tony Cavalero, and Danny McBride also had the same idea. Adam DeVine said, "There wasn't much talking about it. We just did it. You can very easily overthink something like that." He further added, "It was a culmination of the last two-plus seasons and you see their relationship grow and grow. And especially this season, you see them get closer than ever only to have the church tear them apart."

== Reception ==
=== Viewers ===
In its original American broadcast, "I Will Take You by the Hand and Keep You" was seen by an estimated 0.227 million household viewers with a 0.07 in the 18-49 demographics. This means that 0.07 percent of all households with televisions watched the episode. This was a slight decrease in viewership from the previous episode, which was watched by 0.243 million household viewers with a 0.06 in the 18-49 demographics.

=== Critical reviews ===
"I Will Take You by the Hand and Keep You" received critical acclaim. Matt Schimkowitz of The A.V. Club gave the episode an "A" grade and wrote, "'I Will Take You By The Hand And Keep You' reaches some of the series' highest highs, with the performances, music, and direction reveling in a new normal for the family. For the first time, possibly since Jesse joined Gideon’s mission trip, the family is fulfilling God's message in their own way. They truly become the Righteous Gemstones, a marker that will last at least through the finale."

Scott Tobias of Vulture gave the episode a 4 star rating out of 5 and wrote, "There hasn't been enough Baby Billy this season, but Walton Goggins certainly makes every second count. His moonwalking out of the meeting between the Gemstones feels like a weird, inspired improvisational moment that stayed in the cut."

Breeze Riley of Telltale TV gave the episode a 5 star rating out of 5 and wrote, "Taking a step back now that I've gotten my excitement over that into words, 'I Will Take You by the Hand and Keep You' provides a great culmination to the growth of the sibling trio seen over the season." Hawk Ripjaw of TV Obsessive wrote, "The Righteous Gemstones is one of my favorite comedies, but what really makes it sing is the dramatic and emotional moments that give our characters depth."
