= Prelude (The Righteous Gemstones) =

- The Righteous Gemstones episode
- Episode no.: Season 4 Episode 1
- Directed by: Danny McBride
- Written by: John Carcieri; Jeff Fradley; Danny McBride
- Cinematography by: Paul Daley
- Editing by: Justin Bourret
- Original release date: March 9, 2025
- Running time: 39 minutes

Guest appearances
- Bradley Cooper as Elijah Gemstone; Josh McDermitt as Abel Grieves; Jim Cummings as Captain Cane; James Landry Hébert as Major McFall; Sean Bridgers; Jackson Kelly as Winston; Charles Halford; Alex Saxon as Thaddeus; Kimball Farley as Ned Rollins; Paul Schneider as Officer Powell; Nicholas Heffelfinger as Herman; Ethan McDowell as Captain Best; Lew Temple; Owen Campbell

Episode chronology
← Previous "Wonders That Cannot Be Fathomed, Miracles That Cannot Be Counted"	Next → "You Hurled Me Into the Very Heart of the Seas"

"Prelude" is the first episode of the fourth season of the American dark comedy crime television series The Righteous Gemstones. It is the 28th overall episode of the series and was written by executive producer John Carcieri, executive producer Jeff Fradley, and series creator Danny McBride, and directed by McBride. It was released on HBO on March 9, 2025, and also was available on Max on the same date.

The series follows a family of televangelists and megachurch pastors led by widowed patriarch Eli Gemstone. The main focus is Eli and his immature children, Jesse, Kelvin and Judy, all of whom face challenges in their lives. The series depicts the family's past and scandals, which unleash consequences. The episode is set in Virginia 1862, and follows Elijah Gemstone, Eli's ancestor, who pretends to be a military chaplain for money.

According to Nielsen Media Research, the episode was seen by an estimated 0.291 million household viewers and gained a 0.06 ratings share among adults aged 18–49. The episode received mostly positive reviews from critics, with high praise towards Bradley Cooper's guest appearance, directing, production values, and tone.

== Plot ==
In Virginia 1862, Minister Abel Grieves (Josh McDermitt) delivers a sermon in his church, condemning the current war in the country as well as perceived northern aggression. After everyone leaves, a man (Bradley Cooper) is revealed to have slept in the church, mocking Grieves for using the donations for personal gain. Suddenly, the man pulls out a pistol and kills Grieves. He robs the money and the preacher's gold-plated Bible.

The man is confronted by Confederate soldiers outside, as Grieves has been assigned to be Military chaplain for their division. Upon learning that he will be paid $50 a month, he returns to the church, changes clothes with Grieves, and smashes Grieves' face in with a collection plate. He writes to the congregation that he was robbed by a man named Elijah Gemstone, and takes over Grieves' identity.

Three weeks later, Elijah has served as the chaplain, although his Captain questions his alcoholism and gambling. Elijah passes time playing card games, using sleight of hand skills to cheat his fellow soldiers, hiding the proceeds in a box. During his first sermon, he delivers a short and weak speech to the soldiers. One day, Elijah is confronted by Ned Rollins, a soldier who recognized him from before the war. Elijah tackles him and kneels on his throat, but Ned offers a moneymaking opportunity: they will work together in cheating the Division's Major McFall during a card game. They succeed, but then Elijah strangles Ned to death, feeling he cannot take a risk with him, and dumps his body in a locked casket. Ned is declared to have deserted.

The following day, the cavalry is intercepted by Union soldiers. Elijah desperately tries to find safety, finally praying to God. Elijah, alongside the other survivors, are taken by the Union to be executed. Elijah is spared because he is a man of God, but his box of money is seized by the Union. Per the Major's orders, he is told to lead the Confederate soldiers in prayer. Elijah begins his sermon, gradually shifting into a very emotional speech, coming to understand the importance of religion to the soldiers. They are executed by a firing squad, and Elijah is allowed to walk away.

Using a cart, Elijah takes the fallen soldiers back to the Confederate outpost. When questioned over why the Union spared him, Elijah declares that it was God who spared him. That night, shaken by the events, Elijah finally reads the gold-plated Bible for the first time, reading the Book of Genesis aloud.

== Production ==
=== Development ===
The episode was written by executive producer John Carcieri, executive producer Jeff Fradley, and series creator Danny McBride, and directed by McBride. This was Carcieri's 18th writing credit, Fradley's 12th writing credit, McBride's 27th writing credit, and McBride's fifth directing credit.

=== Casting ===
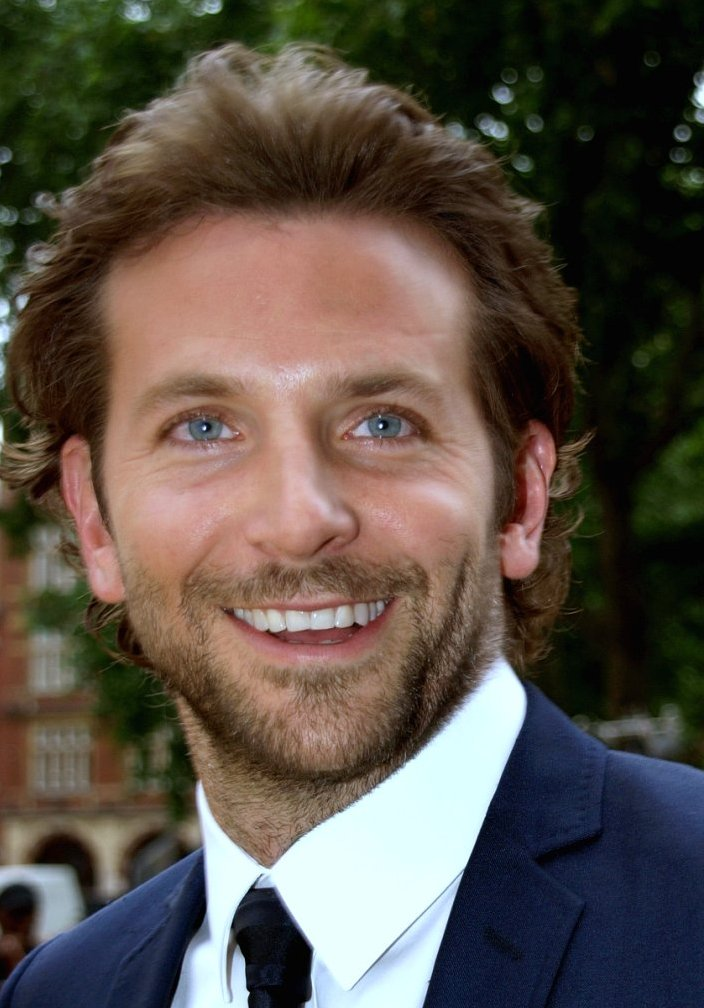
Bradley Cooper guest stars in the episode.

The episode features a guest appearance by Bradley Cooper, who serves as the protagonist of the episode, Elijah Gemstone. McBride said that he was looking to make an episode "far back in the past", but the writers were worried that the audience would feel "bummed" to not see any character from the series. He felt the episode would be a "tall order", saying "Fans have waited over a year for the new season, and it was tricky to write an episode where none of the cast is in the show."

He explained that they were looking for "somebody that had a certain charisma and charm, someone the audience wouldn't mind going on this journey with, somebody that could hold the entire thing on their shoulders", and Cooper was a name that he came up with. Cooper had not watched the series prior to his casting, and decided not to watch it in preparation, as he did not want to be "influenced" by it. McBride was still satisfied with his performance, "Surprisingly, I think he feels like a Gemstone regardless of him not seeing you beforehand."

McBride had grown up in Spotsylvania County, Virginia, where "there was a lot of Civil War action there", even finding old bullets in his backyard. He said, "I've always been fascinated with history, just because I had context for it. When it came time to kick off this final season, I thought it would fitting to tell a story about where the Gemstones came from. No one said 'no,' so we just kept pushing forward." He explained Elijah's point in the episode, "It's not always the perfect person [who] is chosen to spread the word, a lot of times its imperfect people that are chosen to spread that word... Anyone can find their way if they want to, and that's sort of what happens with Bradley's character... He rises to the occasion."

=== Filming ===
According to McBride, the episode was filmed in less than 10 days. He also mentioned that despite its period setting, it might not even be the most expensive episode of the series. He said, "Everything was daylight dependent, except for a handful of scenes. We had to be super efficient and super practical with how we pulled it off. Not to keep singing Bradley's praises, but there was no room for error and he was prepared to work that way."

== Reception ==
=== Viewers ===
In its original American broadcast, "Prelude" was seen by an estimated 0.291 million household viewers with a 0.06 in the 18-49 demographics. This means that 0.06 percent of all households with televisions watched the episode. This was a 35% increase in viewership from the previous episode, which was watched by 0.214 million household viewers with a 0.06 in the 18-49 demographics.

=== Critical reviews ===
"Prelude" received mostly positive reviews from critics. Matt Schimkowitz of The A.V. Club gave the episode a "B" grade and wrote, "“Prelude” is very much that: a setting in motion everything we've seen thus far on the show. While far from the funniest episode, “Prelude” offers a more somber and reflective tone, one that shows the roots of this blasphemous family tree. The Gemstones have kept faith-based kayfabe for more than 160 years and have little reason to stop, seemingly being rewarded by the almighty for misleading and exploiting His followers. That pattern continues to the modern Gemstones despite glimmers of moral righteousness. In this final season, will the circle be unbroken? There's a better home a-waiting if they can find it."

Scott Tobias of Vulture gave the episode a perfect 5 star rating out of 5 and wrote, "I’m sure I'll have plenty of opportunities to sound off about the level of craft on this show, but The Righteous Gemstones remains the rare series where a word like cinematic is a proper descriptor. The evocation of the period here is far above what would be required of a TV comedy, but there are specific sequences that stand out here, too, like a dynamic tracking shot that faces the Confederate side exclusively as they're ripped apart by enemy fire. And that's followed by a montage, set to Waylon Jennings's “Goin' Down Rockin’,” that frames blood-and-mud-caked soldiers dead center as if they were sitting for a portrait. Powerful stuff."

Paul Dailly of TV Fanatic gave the episode a 3.75 star rating out of 5 and wrote, "Standalone episodes are good, but the season premiere lacked the pizazz of other episodes, with little-to-no laughs, which isn’t what we’ve come to expect with this show." Keeley Brooks of Show Snob wrote, "Right out the gate, season 4 paves the yellow brick road of the Gemstone legacy that would last well into the 21st Century, and if they keep up the outrageously absurd antics and relatable family dynamics, the final season of the hit series should welcome us right into the castle and deliver us all from evil."

=== Accolades ===
TVLine named Bradley Cooper as an honorable mention for the "Performer of the Week" for the week of March 15, 2025, for his performance in the episode. The site wrote, "We won't pretend to be surprised that Bradley Cooper did something special in The Righteous Gemstones' final season premiere. The man's got five Oscar nods for acting under his belt; he's pretty good at this. But Cooper's turn as a Civil War-era, down-on-his-luck Gemstone ancestor still demands kudos, after he used every one of those 38 premiere minutes to transform grifter Elijah into a character worth championing. We enjoyed seeing Cooper's comedy chops on display, no doubt, as a greedy and selfish Elijah avoided ever preaching to his Confederate soldiers. But it was in his final scenes of the episode — Elijah's sweet, authentic prayer to his doomed friends, followed by an honest attempt to read the Bible for real — where Cooper did his best work, softening Elijah so swiftly and sincerely that it felt a little like divine intervention."

The episode won the award for Episodic Comedy at the 78th Writers Guild Awards.
