= To Grieve Like the Rest of Men Who Have No Hope =

- The Righteous Gemstones episode
- Episode no.: Season 4 Episode 3
- Directed by: David Gordon Green
- Written by: John Carcieri; Jeff Fradley; Danny McBride
- Cinematography by: Michael Simmonds
- Editing by: Joseph Ettinger
- Original release date: March 23, 2025
- Running time: 34 minutes

Guest appearances
- Michael Rooker; Seann William Scott as Corey Milsap; Valyn Hall as Tiffany Freeman; Stephen Dorff as Vance Simkins; Arden Myrin as Jana Milsap; Steve Little; Megan Mullally as Lori Milsap; James DuMont as Chad; Jody Hill as Levi; Troy Anthony Hogan as Matthew; J. Larose as Gregory; Tristan Borders; Mike Britt

Episode chronology
← Previous "You Hurled Me Into the Very Heart of the Seas"	Next → "He Goeth Before You Into Galilee"

"To Grieve Like the Rest of Men Who Have No Hope" is the third episode of the fourth season of the American dark comedy crime television series The Righteous Gemstones. It is the 30th overall episode of the series and was written by executive producer John Carcieri, executive producer Jeff Fradley, and series creator Danny McBride, and directed by executive producer David Gordon Green. It was released on HBO on March 23, 2025, and also was available on Max on the same date.

The series follows a family of televangelists and megachurch pastors led by widowed patriarch Eli Gemstone. The main focus is Eli and his immature children, Jesse, Kelvin and Judy, all of whom face challenges in their lives. The series depicts the family's past and scandals, which unleash consequences. In the episode, the Gemstones suspect that Eli and Lori might have an affair, while Jesse resumes his rivalry against Vance Simkins.

According to Nielsen Media Research, the episode was seen by an estimated 0.235 million household viewers and gained a 0.06 ratings share among adults aged 18–49. The episode received mostly positive reviews from critics, who praised its humor, performances and character development.

== Plot ==
The Gemstones host a party with Lori (Megan Mullally), who has brought in her son Corey (Seann William Scott) and his wife Jana (Arden Myrin). Kelvin (Adam DeVine) announces that he has been nominated for the Top Christ Following Man of the Year, upsetting Jesse (Danny McBride) as he has not been nominated. During this, Jesse, Kelvin, Judy (Edi Patterson) and Corey notice Eli (John Goodman) hanging out with Lori, and wonder if they are having an affair.

During a pole dancing performance, BJ (Tim Baltz) accidentally falls off and is taken to the hospital. Judy is informed that while BJ will survive, he might have to use a wheelchair, devastating her. Jesse is informed that Vance Simkins (Stephen Dorff) has opened a church next to one of the Gemstones, infuriating him. During a meeting at the Cape and Pistol Society, Vance mocks BJ's accident and reiterates that he will continue opening churches in areas surrounding the Gemstones, to which Jesse promises to strike back.

During the Sunday family lunch, Eli finally confesses that he and Lori have been spending time together. Corey is disgusted with his mother over the revelation and walks away, while the siblings cry over Eli's actions. Eli confronts them, claiming he does not want to feel lonely again and that he would hope Aimee-Leigh would still be alive with him. Eli gets emotional and cries, prompting the siblings to apologize and console him. That night, Jesse's friends help in vandalizing one of Vance's churches, setting it on fire. At the Gemstone mansion, Lori enters Aimee-Leigh's studio, where she tries on her glasses.

== Production ==
=== Development ===
The episode was written by executive producer John Carcieri, executive producer Jeff Fradley, and series creator Danny McBride, and directed by executive producer David Gordon Green. This was Carcieri's 20th writing credit, Fradley's 14th writing credit, McBride's 30th writing credit, and Green's 10th directing credit.

== Reception ==
=== Viewers ===
In its original American broadcast, "You Hurled Me Into the Very Heart of the Seas" was seen by an estimated 0.235 million household viewers with a 0.06 in the 18-49 demographics. This means that 0.06 percent of all households with televisions watched the episode. This was a slight decrease in viewership from the previous episode, which was watched by 0.264 million household viewers with a 0.05 in the 18-49 demographics.

=== Critical reviews ===
"To Grieve Like the Rest of Men Who Have No Hope" received positive reviews from critics. Matt Schimkowitz of The A.V. Club gave the episode a "B+" grade and wrote, "Tonight's Gemstones is all about power and how the family wields it to dominate each other and the greater evangelical landscape — whether through rips or arson. Though Kelvin's dream reveals a vulnerability, it's Keefe's haunting and hypnotizing monologue about Satan's urine, which, “at first, is gross, but it's the Devil's piss, so it can play tricks on us — make people think that it's actually delicious,” that gives the episode its juice."

Scott Tobias of Vulture gave the episode a 4 star rating out of 5 and wrote, "“No matter what,” Jesse says in the sermon that ends the show, “we never turn our back on family. That is our Gemstone commitment to you.” The question remains: Will that commitment be reciprocated?"

Paul Dailly of TV Fanatic gave the episode a 3.25 star rating out of 5 and wrote, "The Righteous Gemstones has traded hilarity for more serious storytelling, and I'm unsure whether it's working." Hawk Ripjaw of TV Obsessive wrote, "To boot, it really feels like everything is coming to a conclusion in this already-fantastic season, and while there is some plot setup for next week, the emotional and thematic elements really feel like they’re taking center stage. Of course, there's still more than enough room for comedy in the funniest show currently airing, and I'd be remiss to not be looking forward to whatever this hilariously dysfunctional family gets up to next week."
