= Interlude IV =

- The Righteous Gemstones episode
- Episode no.: Season 4 Episode 6
- Directed by: David Gordon Green
- Written by: John Carcieri; Jeff Fradley; Danny McBride
- Cinematography by: Michael Simmonds
- Editing by: Joseph Ettinger; Dean Pollack
- Original release date: April 13, 2025
- Running time: 37 minutes

Guest appearances
- Michael Rooker as Cobb Milsap; Megan Mullally as Lori Milsap; Emma Shannon as Young Judy Gemstone; J. Gaven Wilde as Young Jesse Gemstone; Tristan Borders as Young Kelvin Gemstone; Keely Marshall as Young Amber; Sean Ryan Fox as Young Cory Milsap

Episode chronology
← Previous "You Shall Remember"	Next → "For Jealousy Is the Rage of a Man"

"Interlude IV" is the sixth episode of the fourth season of the American dark comedy crime television series The Righteous Gemstones. It is the 33rd overall episode of the series and was written by executive producer John Carcieri, executive producer Jeff Fradley, and series creator Danny McBride, and directed by executive producer David Gordon Green. It was released on HBO on April 13, 2025, and also was available on Max on the same date.

The series follows a family of televangelists and megachurch pastors led by widowed patriarch Eli Gemstone. The main focus is Eli and his immature children, Jesse, Kelvin and Judy, all of whom face challenges in their lives. The series depicts the family's past and scandals, which unleash consequences. In the episode, set in 2002, delves into the relationship between Aimee-Leigh and Lori, as well as the latter's marital problems with her husband Cobb.

According to Nielsen Media Research, the episode was seen by an estimated 0.294 million household viewers and gained a 0.08 ratings share among adults aged 18–49. The episode received mostly positive reviews from critics, who praised the character development and Michael Rooker's guest appearance.

== Plot ==
In 2002, Eli and Aimee-Leigh propose a 10-acre parking lot for their church, but the Rogers County board rejects it, believing that it is not beneficial to the wider community. On their way out of the courthouse, protesters throw pies in their faces.

The Gemstones spend time at their lake house, accompanied by Aimee-Leigh's friend Lori, her son Corey, and her husband Cobb, who owns an alligator attraction. Amber is also staying, revealed to be pregnant with Jesse's first child. Aimee-Leigh invites Lori to stay with her and record a new album. Lori confides that her marriage to Cobb is falling apart. Kelvin sneaks into Judy's bedroom, looking for her teen heartthrob magazines, but discovers her diary, where she confesses having feelings for her teacher. Judy catches him and chases him to his treehouse, where he escapes Judy by pulling up the ladder. During a family dinner, Jesse proclaims that his first child will be named "Stallone", which draws mixed reactions. Cobb arrives at the family mansion to try and convince Lori into coming back home, but is chased off by Eli who punches him in the face. Eli later visits Cobb's alligator farm to try and reconcile with him, but is rebuffed.

While the adults attend a musical performance, the older children decide to go out for Mexican food, leaving Kelvin behind. Believing the house to be empty, Cobb breaks into the Gemstone household, vandalizing each room while stealing valuable items, including Elijah Gemstone's gold-plated Bible. Discovering Kelvin hiding under his bed, he flees the house. When the Gemstones return, Aimee-Leigh consoles a traumatized Kelvin. When questioned by Lori, Corey makes up a fake alibi for his father. Seeing the situation between Lori and Cobb, Jesse asks Eli if he and Aimee-Leigh would ever divorce, but Eli promises they will stay together until the end. When Eli compares "Stallone" to Gideon's journey in the Bible, Jesse becomes fascinated. At his house, Cobb sorts through the stolen items, and examines the gold-plated Bible.

== Production ==
=== Development ===
The episode was written by executive producer John Carcieri, executive producer Jeff Fradley, and series creator Danny McBride, and directed by executive producer David Gordon Green. This was Carcieri's 23rd writing credit, Fradley's 17th writing credit, McBride's 33rd writing credit, and Gordon Green's 11th directing credit.

== Reception ==
=== Viewers ===
In its original American broadcast, "Interlude IV" was seen by an estimated 0.294 million household viewers with a 0.08 in the 18-49 demographics. This means that 0.08 percent of all households with televisions watched the episode. This was a slight increase in viewership from the previous episode, which was watched by 0.276 million household viewers with a 0.05 in the 18-49 demographics.

=== Critical reviews ===
"Interlude IV" received mostly positive reviews from critics. Matt Schimkowitz of The A.V. Club gave the episode a "B+" grade and wrote, "“Interlude IV” gives us much to chew on for the back half of the season. For one thing, we know Lori wasn't kidding when she mentioned her ex. The show did an excellent job hiding Cobb until this episode, often making him seem like a complete non-entity compared to Big Dick Rich. Cobb's unpredictability makes him a prime suspect for the unfortunate demise of Lori's suitors."

Scott Tobias of Vulture gave the episode a 4 star rating out of 5 and wrote, "The show wants us to track the full rise (and potential fall) of the Gemstone empire, but it has wisely refused to clutter up seasons by parsing out the past. It's much more invigorating to put a pause on the current dustups and tell these stories in full."

Robert Pitman of Screen Rant wrote, ""Interlude IV" also gives an odd amount of screentime to alligators. Cobb owns a reptile farm, with the alligators being one of the biggest attractions. The ominous shots of the alligators that are sprinkled throughout the episode could mean that Cobb has been feeding his victims to them, further explaining the killings in The Righteous Gemstones season 4." Hawk Ripjaw of TV Obsessive wrote, "The Interlude episodes never disappoint, and “Interlude IV” was no exception. Introducing Cobb definitely throws a wrench in my theory last week that Corey was behind all of Lori's boyfriends disappearing, as this week definitely seems to suggest that Cobb is the culprit. It's also borderline likely that Corey is working with his dad. I'm honestly not sure! But with next week returning us to the present, I'm sure we’ll have some answers."
