= That Man of God May Be Complete =

- The Righteous Gemstones episode
- Episode no.: Season 4 Episode 9
- Directed by: Danny McBride
- Written by: John Carcieri; Jeff Fradley; Danny McBride
- Cinematography by: Paul Daley
- Editing by: Justin Bourret
- Original release date: May 4, 2025
- Running time: 52 minutes

Guest appearances
- Michael Rooker as Cobb Milsap; Seann William Scott as Corey Milsap; Valyn Hall as Tiffany Freeman; Arden Myrin as Jana Milsap; Stephen Dorff as Vance Simkins; Megan Mullally as Lori Milsap; Walton Goggins as Baby Billy Freeman; Kelton DuMont as Pontius Gemstone; Gavin Munn as Abraham Gemstone; Kerstin Schulze as Sola; Sean Ryan Fox as Young Corey Milsap; Regan Burns as Mick

Episode chronology
← Previous "On Your Belly You Shall Go"	Next → —

"That Man of God May Be Complete" is the series finale of the American dark comedy crime television series The Righteous Gemstones. It is the ninth episode of the fourth season and the 36th overall episode of the series. The episode was written by executive producer John Carcieri, executive producer Jeff Fradley, and series creator Danny McBride, and directed by McBride. It was released on HBO on May 4, 2025, and also was available on Max on the same date.

The series follows a family of televangelists and megachurch pastors led by widowed patriarch Eli Gemstone. The main focus is Eli and his immature children, Jesse, Kelvin and Judy, all of whom face challenges in their lives. The series depicts the family's past and scandals, which unleash consequences. In the final episode, the Gemstones take new directions with their lives, while Lori worries over Corey's behavior.

The episode received critical acclaim, with critics praising the performances, humor, emotional tone and closure to the storylines.

== Plot ==
At a meeting of the Cape and Pistol Society, Vance tells Jesse that he is opening ten new churches around his malls and then proceeds to throw a yellow hanky, challenging him to a pistol duel. Eli volunteers as Jesse's second, but tries to convince his son not to go through with it, though Jesse insists. The duel begins, and Vance shoots first, but misses. He subsequently begs for his life, prompting Jesse to intentionally miss him, though his shot ricochets off a pole and hits another member's leg. Jesse decides to quit the society, deciding that he does not need it to feel important, and Eli also quits in solidarity.

Lori meets with Eli and gives him a box of keepsakes, including a letter Aimee-Leigh wrote her after her divorce, which she hopes will give Eli some comfort. Though they've decided not to pursue a relationship, they part on good terms.

Kelvin surprises Keefe by proposing marriage, which he gladly accepts. BJ feels depressed over Dr. Watson's absence, so Judy and Amber help him get in touch with Dr. Watson, who now resides at a new home. However, Dr. Watson refuses to acknowledge him, so Judy scolds Dr. Watson into reconciling, deciding that they will adopt Dr. Watson again. Baby Billy returns to the Teenjus set, wanting the crew to thank God for saving him. He realizes he has been neglecting his family and abruptly quits the show so he can spend more time with Tiffany and their children.

When Lori mentions that Corey has been distant since Cobb's death, the Gemstones decide to invite him to Galilee Gulch. The gathering is light-hearted and fun until Corey demands $7 million from the Gemstones to buy his father's alligator farm from the bank. Lori scolds Corey for his behavior and Jana attempts to talk him down. Corey violently snaps and shouts at Jana, who says she's had enough of his poor treatment and wants a divorce.

While the rest of the family is on a boat on the lake, Jesse, Judy and Kelvin try to comfort Corey. Inside the house, Kelvin is led by Aimee-Leigh's spirit to Corey's room, where he finds the family's gold-plated Bible, which was stolen by Cobb years ago, and a gun. Kelvin reveals all to his siblings. Corey then appears and tells them he helped Cobb assault all of Lori's boyfriends to drive them away, even killing one of them. He asks them not to tell his mother.

The siblings return to the house and discuss how to proceed. Corey reappears and begins shooting at them. Judy is hit. Jesse and Kelvin hide in the house, but they are both found by Corey and wounded. Out of ammunition, Corey leaves to get another gun from his truck. The siblings crawl to each other, and Judy uses a bell to call Dr. Watson and get him to retrieve Jesse's pistol. The monkey delivers the gun just as Corey returns, with Jesse managing to shoot him in the head. Corey apologizes for his actions and refuses to get help, asking them to simply pray with him as he dies. The three siblings earnestly pray with Corey and ask God to forgive him.

Weeks later, Eli officiates Kelvin's and Keefe's wedding, which is held beside Kelvin's treehouse. As Eli proudly sees his children dancing, Aimee-Leigh narrates her letter to Lori, expressing her devoted love and friendship, which Eli has finally found the courage to read. Lori is seen grieving over her son's grave. Baby Billy happily spends time with Tiffany and their children. Gideon hosts a church-sponsored skateboarding event with Pontius. The gold-plated Bible is displayed in the Gemstone center. Eli has returned to his yacht in Florida. Lori appears on the dock and asks to join him as his first mate, worrying that he might get lost. They smile at each other.

== Production ==
=== Development ===
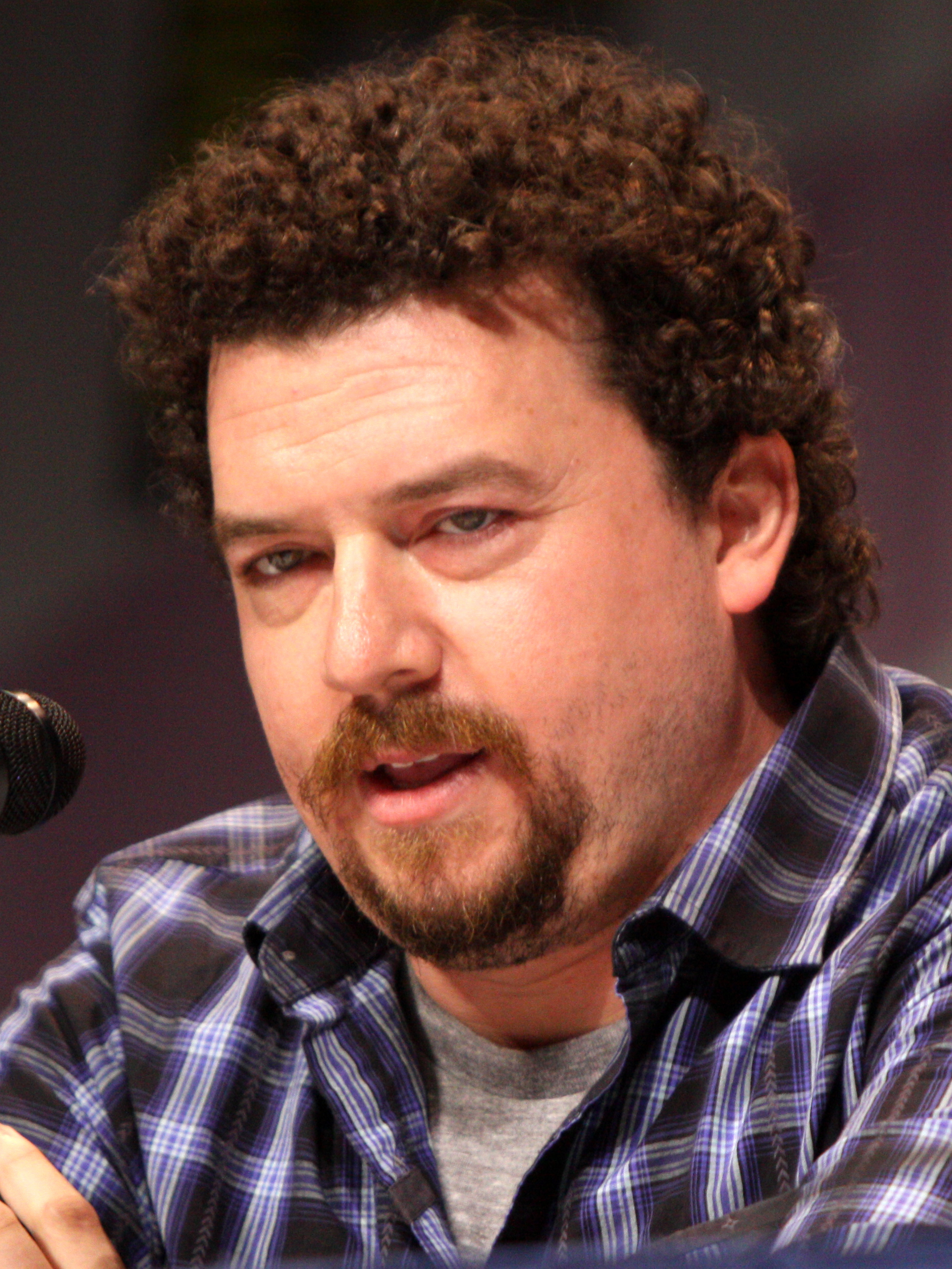
Series creator and main lead actor Danny McBride co-wrote and directed the finale.

In January 2025, HBO confirmed that the series would end with its fourth season. Danny McBride felt that it was fitting to end with the fourth season, explaining it "was a story that was bringing all these themes and these ideas and these characters to a conclusion, to something that felt like completion."

The episode was written by executive producer John Carcieri, executive producer Jeff Fradley, and series creator Danny McBride, and directed by McBride. This was Carcieri's 25th writing credit, Fradley's 18th writing credit, McBride's 36th writing credit, and McBride's 7th directing credit.

=== Writing ===
McBride explained Jesse's decision to quit the society and spare Vance, "He's always worried about how he's perceived or if he's impressive enough, or seen to be the man that he imagined himself to be. So, weirdly, at the end of the day, when he has this opportunity to smite his enemy, and he chooses the path of ultimately restraint, I do think it kind of shows that through all of this, there has been an inkling of growth for Jesse."

On the episode itself, McBride also said, "There's a finality to a show ending with judgment, and I didn't want it to end that way. At the end of the day, the justice that you want to see in real life doesn't need to like happen in this story. That's not what this is ultimately about. It also creates an end to the story, in a way, and I feel like it's better to leave things where you, as the viewer, can imagine that their lives continue. It lives on in your brain, in a way of like, ‘What happens next?’ or ‘What are they up to now?’"

For the scene where Corey shoots the Gemstone siblings, McBride said, "I definitely wanted it to feel real and grounded. Maybe it's nature that as people, we're all sickos, and when you hear that a show's ending, your initial reaction is, “Who's going to die?”" Seann William Scott was informed about his character's actions while doing wardrobe fitting, having read just the prior episodes' scripts. He also explained Corey's death, "This character loves these guys — he wants them to be family. It's not like this whole time he's been filled with envy and he secretly hated them. He just snapped, and when he gets shot and he's dying, all of a sudden, he gets clarity again. He can't believe what he did."

== Reception ==
=== Critical reviews ===
"That Man of God May Be Complete" received critical acclaim. Matt Schimkowitz of The A.V. Club gave the episode an "A" grade and wrote, "McBride softened his characters in this final outing, obscuring the megachurch business for most of the final nine episodes and honing in on the internal struggles of his leads. He humanized Jesse, Judy, and Kelvin, in all their imperfect, corruptible, and contemptible glory, finding redemption in a cathartic and satisfying send-off."

Scott Tobias of Vulture gave the episode a 3 star rating out of 5 and wrote, "In the end, the show wants the best for these flawed souls, and the finale, for better and worse, feeds it to them like a Communion wafer." Jake Schreifels of TIME wrote, "It's the kind of goofy Shakespearean arc that McBride has mastered over the show's consistently hilarious run — but the season doesn't end on a downer. In the finale's coda, each member of the Gemstone family finds their own form of resolution to finally move on."

Randall Colburn of Entertainment Weekly wrote, "The episode also concludes the series itself, which routinely bounced between toe-curling raunch and a fierce sentimentality that sometimes clashed with its trademark cynicism. But that's partly the point, as The Righteous Gemstones often highlights how even the most soulless grifters can be capable of acts of love." Nitish Pahwa of Slate wrote, "It's a daring, audacious way to cap off a show whose grandeur surpassed McBride's prior HBO classics, Eastbound & Down and Vice Principals. It's also a fitting tribute to all the ways Gemstones tackled its sprawling remit: a dark and savage tale of grief-stricken religious grifters whose faith in God and love for one another nevertheless run deep and true."

Robert Pitman of Screen Rant wrote, "The Gemstones' inability to let go of Aimee-Leigh has caused all kinds of conflict in The Righteous Gemstones, so it is good to finally see them accept her death." Hawk Ripjaw of TV Obsessive wrote, "A lot of the first half of this season seemed like “B” plots looking for an “A” plot, but the last few episodes kicked things up a notch. While I think it didn't quite nail the setup, it absolutely does so for the landing. The series finale is funny, thrilling, soulful, and, most important of all, satisfying."
