= He Goeth Before You Into Galilee =

- The Righteous Gemstones episode
- Episode no.: Season 4 Episode 4
- Directed by: Danny McBride
- Written by: John Carcieri; Jeff Fradley; Danny McBride
- Cinematography by: Paul Daley
- Editing by: Justin Bourret
- Original release date: March 30, 2025
- Running time: 39 minutes

Guest appearances
- Seann William Scott as Corey Milsap; Valyn Hall as Tiffany Freeman; Arden Myrin as Jana Milsap; Megan Mullally as Lori Milsap; Walton Goggins as Baby Billy Freeman; Kelton DuMont as Pontius Gemstone; Gavin Munn as Abraham Gemstone; Kerstin Schulze as Sola; Emma Shannon as Young Judy Gemstone; J. Gaven Wilde as Young Jesse Gemstone; Tristan Borders as Young Kelvin Gemstone; Sean Ryan Fox as Young Corey Milsap

Episode chronology
← Previous "To Grieve Like the Rest of Men Who Have No Hope"	Next → "You Shall Remember"

"He Goeth Before You Into Galilee" is the fourth episode of the fourth season of the American dark comedy crime television series The Righteous Gemstones. It is the 31st overall episode of the series and was written by executive producer John Carcieri, executive producer Jeff Fradley, and series creator Danny McBride, and directed by McBride. It was released on HBO on March 30, 2025, and also was available on Max on the same date.

The series follows a family of televangelists and megachurch pastors led by widowed patriarch Eli Gemstone. The main focus is Eli and his immature children, Jesse, Kelvin and Judy, all of whom face challenges in their lives. The series depicts the family's past and scandals, which unleash consequences. In the episode, the Gemstones take Eli and Lori for a weekend at their vacation home, hoping to ruin their affair.

According to Nielsen Media Research, the episode was seen by an estimated 0.375 million household viewers and gained a 0.09 ratings share among adults aged 18–49. The episode received critical acclaim, with critics praising the performances, humor and writing.

== Plot ==
The Gemstones arrive at Galilee Gulch, the family's vacation home. Conversing with Baby Billy (Walton Goggins), Jesse (Danny McBride) explains that the vacation should help break the affair between Eli (John Goodman) and Lori (Megan Mullally), as this will just remind him of Aimee-Leigh's death.

The siblings' attempts do not pan out, with Eli believing the stay is an attempt to get him close to Lori. Corey (Seann William Scott) tells Jesse that he changed his mind about the affair, as he prefers his mother dating Eli than his previous boyfriend, car dealer Mitch. The siblings mention this to Eli, but Lori reaffirms that her relationship with Mitch was never serious. Desperate, Judy (Edi Patterson) tries to coerce Lori into having sex with her, but ends up getting slapped instead. Lori maintains that she only wants to help Eli move on and comforts Judy's solace given her mother's death, causing Judy to become emotional.

When Kelvin (Adam DeVine) expresses his desire to see his mother again, Keefe (Tony Cavalero) takes Aimee-Leigh's clothes and tries to convince a sleeping Eli to end things with Lori. When Lori screams, Eli punches him, causing Baby Billy and Tiffany's nanny to brutally attack Keefe. When everyone arrives at the main room, the siblings finally admit that their plan was to stop the affair. Eli is upset, and scolds everyone for trying to ruin the weekend. The following morning, the siblings decide to apologize to Eli before they leave Galilee Gulch. However, they are disturbed to find them having sex and walk away in disgust. After they express their fears of forgetting their mother, Eli reassures them it will not happen. The siblings become even more disgusted when they see that Eli has ejaculated in his pants, prompting him to walk away.

== Production ==
=== Development ===
The episode was written by executive producer John Carcieri, executive producer Jeff Fradley, and series creator Danny McBride, and directed by McBride. This was Carcieri's 21st writing credit, Fradley's 15th writing credit, McBride's 31st writing credit, and McBride's sixth directing credit.

=== Filming ===
The crew found it difficult to find a lake house in Charleston, South Carolina, where the series is filmed. Due to this, the scenes were filmed later in the season, despite being the fourth episode to air. Two weeks before filming, McBride was worried that they could not find a lake house and considered pausing production. Location manager Kale Murphy fortunately found one, convincing the owners to let them film for three weeks.

For the scene where Judy tries to seduce Lori, Edi Patterson said, "it was mostly exciting to know she was gonna come play in our world and to get to be friends with her. That was very, very exciting and then to know like, “Oh and now we're gonna do this insane thing that I helped write,’ and for her to be totally game was awesome."

For the scene where Baby Billy performs water ski, McBride said that Walton Goggins suggested, "He told me he could do the slalom like that for real, and I said, 'OK, that's the cold open right there, you doing that, nude.'" Like his previous appearances, Goggins used a stand-in for his naked scenes.

== Reception ==
=== Viewers ===
In its original American broadcast, "He Goeth Before You Into Galilee" was seen by an estimated 0.375 million household viewers with a 0.09 in the 18-49 demographics. This means that 0.09 percent of all households with televisions watched the episode. This was a slight increase in viewership from the previous episode, which was watched by 0.325 million household viewers with a 0.06 in the 18-49 demographics.

=== Critical reviews ===
"He Goeth Before You Into Galilee" received critical acclaim. Matt Schimkowitz of The A.V. Club gave the episode an "A" grade and wrote, "For the last two seasons, the Gemstones have squared off against formidable opponents with the money or ideology to challenge the empire. Here, they're facing a family friend they've known their whole lives and whom, earlier this season, said they loved. Gemstones has plenty of out-of-control characters but not a lot of straight men underlining the comedy. Throughout tonight's episode, we see the disgust the kids' plan elicits in their partners and Lori, leading to the biggest laughs this season."

Scott Tobias of Vulture gave the episode a 4 star rating out of 5 and wrote, "the waterskiing bit is cinema because so much forethought has gone into the funniest possible staging of the sequence. Specifically, there was the revelation that Baby Billy dropping to one ski would result in the most intense stream of water shooting up toward his scrotum. That's not juvenilia. That’s art."

Paul Dailly of TV Fanatic gave the episode a perfect 5 star rating out of 5 and wrote, "There are many, many directions that this storyline could go, but the last thing I expected was for Keefe to wear Aimee-Leigh’s clothes and channel Eli's dead wife to try to drum some sense into him. The hilarity that ensued from that development alone was enough to make The Righteous Gemstones Season 4 Episode 4 one of the series' best." Hawk Ripjaw of TV Obsessive wrote, "“He Goeth Before You Into Galilee” really exemplified the death-grip that grief has on the Gemstone family, from the kids acting out to Eli clearly being hesitant about returning to the lake house, as well as him looking at the photo of Aimee-Leigh."

=== Accolades ===
TVLine named Edi Patterson as an honorable mention for the "Performer of the Week" for the week of April 5, 2025, for her performance in the episode. The site wrote, "When we say The Righteous Gemstones' Judy Gemstone is unpredictable, we really can't emphasize it enough: We never have any clue what crude and oddly specific insult is going to tumble out of her mouth next, but we do know Edi Patterson's delivery will give us some of the week's funniest TV. Such was the case in Sunday's episode, when Judy tried to sabotage her dad's relationship with Lori Milsap by intimidating Lori with a one-on-one chat. Judy's plan was totally ineffective (duh), but we were blessed in the meantime with some of Patterson's most go-for-broke physical comedy and unrivaled line readings. We'll simply never forget Judy trying to goad Lori into sexually harassing her; there's life before we heard the sentence, “Don't be bumpin’ on my bare t—ty meat,” and there's life after."
