= Burn for Burn, Wound for Wound, Stripe for Stripe =

- The Righteous Gemstones episode
- Episode no.: Season 3 Episode 7
- Directed by: Danny McBride
- Written by: Jeff Fradley; John Carcieri; Danny McBride
- Cinematography by: Paul Daley
- Editing by: Justin Bourret
- Original release date: July 23, 2023
- Running time: 39 minutes

Guest appearances
- Kristen Johnston as May–May Montgomery; Lukas Haas as Chuck Montgomery; Valyn Hall as Tiffany Freeman; Sturgill Simpson as Marshall; Rusty Schwimmer as Sheriff Brenda; Steve Zahn as Peter Montgomery; Walton Goggins as Baby Billy Freeman; Kelton DuMont as Pontius Gemstone; Gavin Munn as Abraham Gemstone; Robert Oberst as Karl Montgomery; Quincy Dunn-Baker as Dakota; Stephen Louis Grush as Jacob

Episode chronology
← Previous "For Out of the Heart Comes Evil Thoughts"	Next → "I Will Take You by the Hand and Keep You"

"Burn for Burn, Wound for Wound, Stripe for Stripe" is the seventh episode of the third season of the American dark comedy crime television series The Righteous Gemstones. It is the 25th overall episode of the series and was written by executive producer Jeff Fradley, executive producer John Carcieri, and series creator Danny McBride, and directed by co-executive producer McBride. It was released on HBO on July 23, 2023, and also was available on Max on the same date.

The series follows a family of televangelists and megachurch pastors led by widowed patriarch Eli Gemstone. The main focus is Eli and his immature children, Jesse, Kelvin and Judy, all of whom face challenges in their lives. The series depicts the family's past and scandals, which unleash consequences. In the episode, Jesse, Kelvin and Judy are kidnapped by the Montgomerys, who demand $15 million from Eli for their release.

According to Nielsen Media Research, the episode was seen by an estimated 0.243 million household viewers and gained a 0.06 ratings share among adults aged 18–49. The episode received extremely positive reviews from critics, who praised the performances, directing, tension and climax.

== Plot ==
While leaving to buy medicine for BJ (Tim Baltz), Judy (Edi Patterson) is kidnapped after her car is crushed by the Redeemer monster truck. Kelvin (Adam DeVine) is also kidnapped while looking for Keefe (Tony Cavalero), while Jesse (Danny McBride) is sedated after Chuck (Lukas Haas) intercepts him at a parking lot.

Peter (Steve Zahn) sends a ransom video to Eli (John Goodman) about the kidnapping, demanding $15 million for their release. After talking with May–May (Kristen Johnston), Eli informs Peter that he will not pay him, believing that he will do the right thing. When Peter's henchmen start considering killing one of the Gemstones, Karl (Robert Oberst) starts questioning his role. The Gemstones are informed by Peter that Eli refused to pay, and one of them will die when the church service ends that day. After seeing Eli and the family pray for the siblings' safety, May–May leaves after a call, unaware that Gideon (Skyler Gisondo) is watching her.

May–May arrives at the compound and she and Karl release Jesse, Kelvin and Judy. As they sneak outside, they are confronted by Peter and Chuck. Peter threatens to shoot May–May, who tries to get Chuck to shoot her. Suddenly, Gideon appears, having taken over the Redeemer and starts destroying the compound. May–May, Karl, Jesse, Kelvin and Judy escape in May–May's car, but the entrance is closed by Peter's henchmen. Gideon returns with the Redeemer to crush the vehicles, allowing him and the car to escape.

== Production ==
=== Development ===
The episode was written by executive producer Jeff Fradley, executive producer John Carcieri, and series creator Danny McBride, and directed by McBride. This was Fradley's tenth writing credit, Carcieri's 16th writing credit, McBride's 25th writing credit, and McBride's fourth directing credit.

=== Filming ===
While Gideon drives the Redeemer monster truck, actor Skyler Gisondo never drove the vehicle. Gisondo felt that his trouble in riding a motor bike in previous seasons prompted the crew to not let him drive the monster truck. He said, "They constructed this crazy rig to get coverage of us when we're driving the Redeemer. But they had a professional monster-truck driver. Dude was getting to do his thing."

== Reception ==
=== Viewers ===
In its original American broadcast, "Burn for Burn, Wound for Wound, Stripe for Stripe" was seen by an estimated 0.243 million household viewers with a 0.06 in the 18-49 demographics. This means that 0.06 percent of all households with televisions watched the episode. This was a 19% decrease in viewership from the previous episode, which was watched by 0.301 million household viewers with a 0.08 in the 18-49 demographics.

=== Critical reviews ===
"Burn for Burn, Wound for Wound, Stripe for Stripe" received extremely positive reviews from critics. Matt Schimkowitz of The A.V. Club gave the episode a "B" grade and wrote, "'Burn For Burn, Wound For Wound, Stripe For Stripe' is an episode-long sibling hang-sesh with at least one scene that could qualify as a breakthrough. Imprisoned on Peter's farm, the Gemstones kids run up against the limitations of their self-image with one final test of their talents. Like Kelvin, they make it approximately six inches off the ground and land flat on their face. Tonight allows the three siblings to face their challenges head-on, prove to their father they can work together, and show the world that there's nothing more dangerous than a unified Gemstone front."

Scott Tobias of Vulture gave the episode a 4 star rating out of 5 and wrote, "'Burn for Burn, Wound for Wound, Stripe for Stripe' is an action-oriented episode, without much time to ruminate over how all these characters find themselves in this ridiculous predicament. But it's a viscerally entertaining payoff to the conflicts that have been brewing all season between Eli and his kids, the Gemstones and the Montgomerys, and the ministry and the have-nots who have been propping it up all these years."

Breeze Riley of Telltale TV gave the episode a 4.5 star rating out of 5 and wrote, "The Righteous Gemstones isn't an action comedy but it's a comedy that knows action as seen on 'Burn for Burn, Wound for Wound, Stripe for Stripe'. Directed by Jesse Gemstone himself Danny McBride and written by John Carcieri, Jeff Fradley, and Danny McBride, the episode is one of the more audacious outings." Hawk Ripjaw of TV Obsessive wrote, "Wow, a lot goes down this week. Not unlike last season's 'And Infants Shall Rule Over Them' in the hospital as Eli recovered from an attempt on his life, 'Burn for Burn, Wound for Wound, Stripe for Stripe' is one of the most exciting, hilarious, and compelling episodes of the season."
