= Interlude III =

- The Righteous Gemstones episode
- Episode no.: Season 3 Episode 5
- Directed by: David Gordon Green
- Written by: John Carcieri; Danny McBride
- Cinematography by: Michael Simmonds
- Editing by: Justin Bourret
- Original release date: July 9, 2023
- Running time: 33 minutes

Guest appearances
- Kristen Johnston as May–May Montgomery; Steve Zahn as Peter Montgomery; Emma Shannon as Young Judy Gemstone; J. Gaven Wilde as Young Jesse Gemstone; Tristan Borders as Young Kelvin Gemstone; Keely Marshall as Young Amber; Sean Whalen as Walker

Episode chronology
← Previous "I Have Not Come to Bring Peace, But a Sword"	Next → "For Out of the Heart Comes Evil Thoughts"

"Interlude III" is the fifth episode of the third season of the American dark comedy crime television series The Righteous Gemstones. It is the 23rd overall episode of the series and was written by executive producer John Carcieri and series creator Danny McBride, and directed by executive producer David Gordon Green. It was released on HBO on July 9, 2023, and also was available on Max on the same date.

The series follows a family of televangelists and megachurch pastors led by widowed patriarch Eli Gemstone. The main focus is Eli and his immature children, Jesse, Kelvin and Judy, all of whom face challenges in their lives. The series depicts the family's past and scandals, which unleash consequences. The episode is set in 2000, and follows conflicts in the family, as well as establishing Peter's problems with Eli.

According to Nielsen Media Research, the episode was seen by an estimated 0.240 million household viewers and gained a 0.05 ratings share among adults aged 18–49. The episode received extremely positive reviews from critics, who praised Green's directing, writing, performances and character development.

== Plot ==
In 2000, a young Judy (Emma Shannon) makes an unwanted sexual remark towards a high school classmate, Trent, when she is asked to move her hair away from him. Annoyed with her behavior, Trent cuts her hair with scissors, causing her classmates to laugh at her. She confronts Trent, telling him she loved him and destroys his saxophone.

Eli (John Goodman) and Aimee-Leigh (Jennifer Nettles) face public scrutiny after having warned about Y2K, claiming it would cause the apocalypse. They profited by selling survival kits to their parishioners, causing protests outside their church when nothing happened. That night, Jesse (J. Gaven Wilde) brings his girlfriend, Amber (Keely Marshall), to a family dinner. Judy makes it clear she does not like Amber, accusing her of going out with Jesse just for his money. Amber accidentally leaves her grandmother's ring in the bathroom, which Judy then steals.

May–May (Kristen Johnston) and Peter (Steve Zahn) lead a snake handling church, and later visit the Gemstone estate, hiding their mockery and disdain for them. Peter confides in Eli that he is in financial trouble after having spent $25,000 on the Gemstone's Y2K survival kits. Eli offers to help him out by buying back his unused inventory. Peter eventually comes clean to his family, causing May–May to confront Eli and refuse to accept any of his money. Eli and Aimee-Leigh talk at the salvation center, worried about May–May's accusations of their dishonesty regarding Y2K, revealing they never believed in it. Their conversation soon exchanges into their children, with them admitting Judy is a problem, unaware that Judy is nearby overhearing them.

Jesse demands that Judy give back Amber's ring, and they both bond over their conflicts. Judy returns the ring to Amber, while Jesse dons a mask and brutally attacks Trent for cutting Judy's hair, shaving his hair and spanking him in front of the class. After a suggestion from Martin (Gregory Alan Williams), Eli faces the protesters, admitting his own mistakes but convincing them to give them a chance to spread the word of God in the church. Peter prepares to take the survival kits to Eli, but instead decides to leave them in a storage unit. He later attempts to rob a bank, but ends up killing a security guard, while collapsing after being shot in the cheek and leg, unable to move as police sirens approach.

== Production ==
=== Development ===
The episode was written by executive producer John Carcieri and series creator Danny McBride, and directed by executive producer David Gordon Green. This was Carcieri's 14th writing credit, McBride's 23rd writing credit, and Green's ninth directing credit.

=== Writing ===
J. Gaven Wilde explained that the scene at Judy's bedroom was done to further develop their characters beyond their conflicts, explaining, "What I really tried to bring to that scene was an overall brother-sister tension. We wanted to show that Jesse and Judy are deeper than what we have seen so far. They're not just these one-dimensional characters. They can be deep and complex." Emma Shannon also added, "I think, deep down, they love each other. I think, especially with the introduction of Kelvin, they grew closer, because neither of us wanted Kelvin to be a new member of the family. We hate each other, but deep down we love each other."

=== Filming ===
For the episode, David Gordon Green explained the crew was not "shooting it like a comedy." As a form of subverting expectations, Green chose to film Peter's robbery from the point of view of the diner booth across the street. He explained, "We're just trying to up the ante, and do something different. It was something you had to map out and choreograph and do safely, so nobody got run over. Then you hope that the lighting stays the same so you can do it all in one take."

== Reception ==
=== Viewers ===
In its original American broadcast, "I Have Not Come to Bring Peace, But a Sword" was seen by an estimated 0.240 million household viewers with a 0.05 in the 18-49 demographics. This means that 0.05 percent of all households with televisions watched the episode. This was a slight decrease in viewership from the previous episode, which was watched by 0.256 million household viewers with a 0.05 in the 18-49 demographics.

=== Critical reviews ===
"Interlude III" received extremely positive reviews from critics. Matt Schimkowitz of The A.V. Club gave the episode a "B+" grade and wrote, "'Interlude III' provides much context to the first four episodes but also raises questions about the future. Namely, why was Peter's investment in Eli's doomsday grift such a secret? Most importantly, May–May attacks Aimee-Leigh in the season opener. Why does she blame her specifically?"

Scott Tobias of Vulture gave the episode a perfect 5 star rating out of 5 and wrote, "The Righteous Gemstones doesn't try to use 'Interlude III' as too tidy an account of the adult Judy, but it does show what a misfit she remains as the middle sibling and only girl in a family whose business doesn't have a succession track for women." Breeze Riley of Telltale TV gave the episode a 4 star rating out of 5 and wrote, "Every season The Righteous Gemstones delivers a standout flashback episode, and Season 3 is no different. 'Interlude III' sets up the feud between the Montgomerys and Gemstones while also giving us a heartwrenching look at Judy’s youth."
