= On Your Belly You Shall Go =

- The Righteous Gemstones episode
- Episode no.: Season 4 Episode 8
- Directed by: Jonathan Watson
- Written by: Edi Patterson; John Carcieri; Danny McBride
- Cinematography by: Paul Daley
- Editing by: Todd Zelin
- Original release date: April 27, 2025
- Running time: 37 minutes

Guest appearances
- Michael Rooker as Cobb Milsap; Seann William Scott as Corey Milsap; Valyn Hall as Tiffany Freeman; Stephen Dorff as Vance Simkins; Arden Myrin as Jana Milsap; Megan Mullally as Lori Milsap; Walton Goggins as Baby Billy Freeman; Kelton DuMont as Pontius Gemstone; Gavin Munn as Abraham Gemstone; Kerstin Schulze as Sola; Regan Burns as Big Dick Mitch

Episode chronology
← Previous "For Jealousy Is the Rage of a Man"	Next → "That Man of God May Be Complete"

"On Your Belly You Shall Go" is the eighth episode of the fourth season of the American dark comedy crime television series The Righteous Gemstones. It is the 35th overall episode of the series and was written by Edi Patterson, executive producer John Carcieri, and series creator Danny McBride, and directed by executive producer Jonathan Watson. It was released on HBO on April 27, 2025, and also was available on Max on the same date.

The series follows a family of televangelists and megachurch pastors led by widowed patriarch Eli Gemstone. The main focus is Eli and his immature children, Jesse, Kelvin and Judy, all of whom face challenges in their lives. The series depicts the family's past and scandals, which unleash consequences. In the episode, Eli is targeted, while Billy focuses on his Teenjus series. Meanwhile, the siblings are approached by Lori, who wants to reconcile with Eli.

According to Nielsen Media Research, the episode was seen by an estimated 0.280 million household viewers and gained a 0.06 ratings share among adults aged 18–49. The episode received mostly positive reviews from critics, who praised the closure to Cobb's story arc.

== Plot ==
BJ surprises Judy by showing that he has slowly re-gained his ability to walk, thanks to his therapy sessions with Dr. Watson, and announces his plan to keep the monkey permanently. Dr. Watson charms the Gemstone family at dinner, but Eli still feels depressed after his break-up with Lori.

During Corey's birthday party, Cobb shows up, to Lori's chagrin. After giving Corey a knife as a gift, he tries to get his to reveal Lori's relationship status and slaps him when he does not answer. Cobb then intimidates Lori, implying that Eli could meet the same fate as her ex, Big Dick Mitch, who has disappeared. Lori kicks him out of the house and tries to warn Eli, who does not answer her calls. Desperate, she visits Jesse, Judy and Kelvin to help her contact Eli. When they refuse, she opens her heart to express her love for them, as well as how she influenced their lives. Moved, they agree to help her. Judy is scared when Dr. Watson almost electrocutes her in the bathtub, and convinces BJ to let return the monkey. However, she feels guilty upon finding that Dr. Watson is saddened because he also lost his mother at a young age.

Baby Billy continues prioritizing his lead performance in Teenjus, straining his marriage with Tiffany. During a musical sequence, he gets annoyed when Eli, as an extra, botches his performance. While talking in the car, both are subdued with tranquilizer darts. They awaken tied up in a bunker, along with a naked and traumatized Big Dick Mitch. Cobb shows up, revealed to be their kidnapper, explaining that he has tortured and raped Big Dick Mitch for his pleasure. He is forced to leave when two police officers arrive at the gator farm investigating the disappearance of Big Dick Mitch, and the prisoners seize the opportunity to escape. As the cops prepare to leave, they see Big Dick Mitch running by, prompting Cobb to kill the officers, and later, his employee.

Baby Billy and Eli move through the farm until they are cornered by Cobb near the alligators' exhibition. Running out of bullets, he brutally attacks Eli, gaining the upper hand with his cattle prod. Baby Billy then snorts cocaine from his ring in order to gain strength, but Cobb easily overpowers him. Just as he prepares to kill them, Corey jumps onto Cobb and stabs him in the back with the knife he gave him. He then pushes Cobb him into the alligator pond, and Eli rings the feeding bell, calling the alligators to come and eat Cobb alive. As authorities find them, the rest of the family arrives, and Eli and Lori reconcile.

== Production ==
=== Development ===
The episode was written by Edi Patterson, executive producer John Carcieri, and series creator Danny McBride, and directed by executive producer Jonathan Watson. This was Patterson's fourth writing credit, Carcieri's 24th writing credit, McBride's 34th writing credit, and Watson's third directing credit.

== Reception ==
=== Viewers ===
In its original American broadcast, "On Your Belly You Shall Go" was seen by an estimated 0.280 million household viewers with a 0.06 in the 18-49 demographics. This means that 0.06 percent of all households with televisions watched the episode. This was a slight decrease in viewership from the previous episode, which was watched by 0.289 million household viewers with a 0.05 in the 18-49 demographics.

=== Critical reviews ===
"On Your Belly You Shall Go" received mostly positive reviews from critics. Matt Schimkowitz of The A.V. Club gave the episode a "B+" grade and wrote, "Tonight's episode, “On Your Belly You Will Go,” continues the show's economy of storytelling and is exceptionally well structured as it builds to Cobb and Eli's climax while highlighting what sets this season apart. This final season has differed from the rest in a few ways, but it distinguishes itself through scale."

Scott Tobias of Vulture gave the episode a 3 star rating out of 5 and wrote, "There's at least one major shoe that could drop — why devote an entire episode to the Gemstone origin story if that gold Bible isn't going to pay off somehow? — but The Righteous Gemstones loves these grotesque, dysfunctional louts. Perhaps if their enormous sins are forgivable, so are ours."

Robert Pitman of Screen Rant wrote, "Many of the season's stories overlap in The Righteous Gemstones season 4, episode 8, setting up an exciting finale that could go in a variety of different directions." Hawk Ripjaw of TV Obsessive wrote, "“On Your Belly You Shall Go” is the penultimate episode of the final season of The Righteous Gemstones, and this was one of the best episodes of the season. The climax in particular was especially exciting, even with Cobb as the main villain being pretty heavily telegraphed."
