= For Out of the Heart Comes Evil Thoughts =

- The Righteous Gemstones episode
- Episode no.: Season 3 Episode 6
- Directed by: Jonathan Watson
- Written by: John Carcieri; Danny McBride
- Cinematography by: Paul Daley
- Editing by: Joseph Ettinger
- Original release date: July 16, 2023
- Running time: 36 minutes

Guest appearances
- Kristen Johnston as May–May Montgomery; Lukas Haas as Chuck Montgomery; Casey Wilson as Kristy; Steve Zahn as Peter Montgomery; Walton Goggins as Baby Billy Freeman; James DuMont as Chad; Jody Hill as Levi; Troy Anthony Hogan as Matthew; J. LaRose as Gregory; Stephen Schneider as Stephen; Robert Oberst as Karl Montgomery; Mary Hollis Inboden as Mandy; Maggie Winters as Taryn

Episode chronology
| ← Previous "Interlude III" | Next → "Burn for Burn, Wound for Wound, Stripe for Stripe" |

"For Out of the Heart Comes Evil Thoughts" is the sixth episode of the third season of the American dark comedy crime television series The Righteous Gemstones. It is the 24th overall episode of the series and was written by executive producer John Carcieri and series creator Danny McBride, and directed by co-executive producer Jonathan Watson. It was released on HBO on July 16, 2023, and also was available on Max on the same date.

The series follows a family of televangelists and megachurch pastors led by widowed patriarch Eli Gemstone. The main focus is Eli and his immature children, Jesse, Kelvin and Judy, all of whom face challenges in their lives. The series depicts the family's past and scandals, which unleash consequences. In the episode, BJ decides to take action after discovering Judy's infidelity, while Jesse introduces Aimee-Leigh's hologram to the family.

According to Nielsen Media Research, the episode was seen by an estimated 0.301 million household viewers and gained a 0.08 ratings share among adults aged 18–49. The episode received extremely positive reviews from critics, who praised the performances, character development and the fight sequence.

== Plot ==
BJ (Tim Baltz) is ignoring Judy (Edi Patterson) after she revealed her affair, despite her attempts in getting things back to normal. To complicate matters, Kristy (Casey Wilson) is seeking a $500,000 compensation for the affair, refusing to let Stephen (Stephen Schneider) speak.

Karl (Robert Oberst) and Chuck (Lukas Haas) decide to move out of the Gemstone estate, with Jesse (Danny McBride) giving them his precious monster truck. Kelvin (Adam DeVine) assigns Taryn (Maggie Winters) as his new second hand, although he laments Keefe (Tony Cavalero) leaving to become a carpenter. Judy asks Eli (John Goodman) for help in the money, disclosing the affair. An upset Eli dismisses her, telling her that she needs to solve her own problems. An angry Judy leaves by saying she hates him. Seeing that BJ cannot properly perform his duties at the salvation center, Jesse tells him he must face Stephen. With Jesse's buddies' help, BJ trains to eventually confront Stephen.

Baby Billy (Walton Goggins) shows Jesse the hologram of Aimee-Leigh (Jennifer Nettles), agreeing to provide the equipment if Jesse greenlights Bible Bonkers, which Jesse accepts. He shows the hologram to the family, which disgusts them. As Jesse, Judy and Kelvin fight on stage, an upset Eli destroys the equipment, while May–May (Kristen Johnston) chastises them for disrespecting Eli. BJ arrives at Stephen's house, discovering him naked and masturbating. He punches Stephen with a brass knuckle that Jesse gave him and Stephen fights back. Stephen gains the upper hand and attacks BJ with his own brass knuckles. Suddenly, BJ grabs him by the testicles and brutally attacks Stephen outside his house. As the neighbors watch him, BJ leaves the house. He returns home, shocking Judy with his bloodied clothes. He says "I hope you like me now" before going upstairs.

== Production ==
=== Development ===
The episode was written by executive producer John Carcieri and series creator Danny McBride, and directed by co-executive producer Jonathan Watson. This was Carcieri's 15th writing credit, McBride's 24th writing credit, and Watson's first directing credit.

=== Filming ===
When the writers planned the storyline regarding Judy's infidelity, they envisioned a fight between BJ and a naked man. John Carcieri and Danny McBride wanted the scene to feel dynamic and explosive, and not "like the comedy version of a fight scene." Originally, actor Stephen Schneider would use a prosthetic penis, but he decided that it would be easier to be nude, saying "“We don't have a ton of these things as we get older. When you're a little kid, it's like, can you go swim out to that and make it back? This was terrifying. That's why I knew I had to try to do it, to try to overcome that kind of fear. To me, comedically, it feels like the most authentic and the most funny if I’m really just putting myself out there. So I gave them the go-ahead on that, and then I just began to panic for six fucking straight months."

The fight was filmed in a house in Charleston, South Carolina, with the crew adjusting to the house's layout in order to film the scene. It was also the final scene to be filmed for the season. Actor Tim Baltz explained, "It's really intense. We're both taking physical blows — and it's kind of cold out, and we both kind of ended up bleeding for it."

== Reception ==
=== Viewers ===
In its original American broadcast, "For Out of the Heart Comes Evil Thoughts" was seen by an estimated 0.301 million household viewers with a 0.08 in the 18-49 demographics. This means that 0.08 percent of all households with televisions watched the episode. This was a 25% increase in viewership from the previous episode, which was watched by 0.240 million household viewers with a 0.05 in the 18-49 demographics.

=== Critical reviews ===
"For Out of the Heart Comes Evil Thoughts" received extremely positive reviews from critics. Matt Schimkowitz of The A.V. Club gave the episode an "A–" grade and wrote, "The success of a cathartic 'For Out Of The Heart Comes Evil Thoughts' is owed to the show's intricate plotting and unrestrained performances, particularly from Stephen Schneider, who seemed unbothered, unashamed, and unencumbered in his very nude fight scene. Director Jonathan Watson and writers Danny McBride and John Carcieri push the family off a cliff and onto the jagged rocks below, allowing the emotionally-mangled corpses to limp through a series of interpersonal failures."

Scott Tobias of Vulture gave the episode a 4 star rating out of 5 and wrote, "these are mere throat-clearings for the aria of unsheathed wangdom in this episode, and now the possibilities are wide open. A new beachhead has been established. And it's entirely fitting that a Danny McBride show would be the one to pull it off, given the blunt-force vulgarity that's carried him and his co-conspirators through shows like Eastbound & Down, Vice Principals, and now this. At bottom, the fight really just exploits a long-standing comic rule: Male nudity is funny." Breeze Riley of Telltale TV gave the episode a 4 star rating out of 5 and wrote, "this installment explores the fallout of the Gemstones' struggles to live up to their parents' legacy. The common thread with all three children is they think they don't have the partner they need when it's them who are the problem."
