= Wonders That Cannot Be Fathomed, Miracles That Cannot Be Counted =

- The Righteous Gemstones episode
- Episode no.: Season 3 Episode 9
- Directed by: Jody Hill
- Written by: John Carcieri; Jeff Fradley; Danny McBride
- Cinematography by: Todd Zelin
- Editing by: Paul Daley
- Original release date: July 30, 2023
- Running time: 39 minutes

Guest appearances
- Kristen Johnston as May–May Montgomery; Lukas Haas as Chuck Montgomery; Valyn Hall as Tiffany Freeman; Stephen Dorff as Vance Simkins; Iliza Shlesinger as Shay Marigold; Shea Whigham as Dusty Daniels; Steve Zahn as Peter Montgomery; Walton Goggins as Baby Billy Freeman; Kelton DuMont as Pontius Gemstone; Gavin Munn as Abraham Gemstone; James DuMont as Chad; Jody Hill as Levi; Troy Anthony Hogan as Matthew; J. LaRose as Gregory; Robert Oberst as Karl Montgomery; Gogo Lomo-David as Craig Simkins; Mary Hollis Inboden as Mandy

Episode chronology
← Previous "I Will Take You by the Hand and Keep You"	Next → "Prelude"

"Wonders That Cannot Be Fathomed, Miracles That Cannot Be Counted" is the ninth episode and season finale of the third season of the American dark comedy crime television series The Righteous Gemstones. It is the 27th overall episode of the series and was written by executive producer John Carcieri, executive producer Jeff Fradley, and series creator Danny McBride, and directed by executive producer Jody Hill. It was released on HBO on July 30, 2023, and also was available on Max on the same date, airing back-to-back with the previous episode, "I Will Take You by the Hand and Keep You".

The series follows a family of televangelists and megachurch pastors led by widowed patriarch Eli Gemstone. The main focus is Eli and his immature children, Jesse, Kelvin and Judy, all of whom face challenges in their lives. The series depicts the family's past and scandals, which unleash consequences. In the episode, Peter puts his plan into motion in order to take down the Gemstones.

According to Nielsen Media Research, the episode was seen by an estimated 0.214 million household viewers and gained a 0.06 ratings share among adults aged 18–49. The episode received near critical acclaim, with critics praising the payoff to the storylines, performances and final scene.

== Plot ==
Baby Billy (Walton Goggins) informs Jesse (Danny McBride), Kelvin (Adam DeVine) and Judy (Edi Patterson) that he met Dusty Daniels (Shea Whigham) in 2000 while celebrating New Year, in which they engaged in an orgy. He talked with Dusty about them, and he is willing to start a partnership, but only if they compete against the Simkins. Baby Billy suggests competing in his Bible Bonkers game show, asking them to greenlight it or lose the collaboration.

Peter (Steve Zahn) stops for change, telling Chuck (Lukas Haas) that he appreciates him for staying with him. While at the store, the truck explodes, with no signs of Chuck. Peter is forced to flee, as he is named as the prime suspect of the bombing. He later steals a "Smut Busters" truck that Keefe (Tony Cavalero) left at a gas station. The following day, as May–May (Kristen Johnston) and Karl (Robert Oberst) pray for Chuck, an alive Chuck appears. He confesses that they were planning to target an attack on the Gemstones and he detonated the bomb to escape from Peter. Jesse is upset at his betrayal, but eventually reconciles with Chuck.

Before the first Bible Bonkers, Billy thanks the siblings for the opportunity and gives them cards with the answers to the day's questions. Despite temptation, the Gemstones decide to play fairly. The Gemstones are off to a poor start, failing to score a single point against the Simkins. During this, Eli (John Goodman), May–May and Gideon (Skyler Gisondo) notice Peter in the van and follow him to the church. Holding them at gunpoint, Peter reveals that he made a new bomb in the van, which he connected to a Fitbit connecting his heart and will explode if he dies. Discovering that Chuck betrayed him, Peter decides to go forward with the bombing, having lost his faith. Suddenly, a swarm of locusts attack them, which escalates into Bible Bonkers' taping.

Amidst the chaos, the set is destroyed and many people accidentally die. During this, Vance (Stephen Dorff) pushes Dusty aside, but Dusty is saved by Jesse. As the Gemstones cover themselves, Peter enters and reunites with his family. In the aftermath, Dusty decides to cut off his partnership with the Simkins. May–May considers it as a sign from God, and concludes that they were wrong about their perception of the Gemstones, while Peter admits his wrongdoings. However, Peter accidentally activates the bomb, giving them less than a minute. He decides to drive the truck far away from the church as the bomb explodes, seemingly dying in the process.

Some time later, Dusty peacefully dies. During the funeral, Eli announces that Dusty left his lands to the Gemstones. Judy and BJ (Tim Baltz) have promoted marriage counseling based on books provided by Amber (Cassidy Freeman). Kelvin and Keefe decide to disband the "Smut Busters" and "live and let live." Jesse enrols Pontius (Kelton Dumont) in a military academy. Gideon tells Eli about his interest in becoming a preacher, delighting him. Later, the Gemstones, Freemans and the Montgomerys reunite under the big family tree, including an alive Peter, who is now using a prosthetic leg. They then separately use the Redeemer to destroy old furniture, enjoying a good time. In the distance, the spirit of Aimee-Leigh (Jennifer Nettles) proudly sees the reunion.

== Production ==
=== Development ===
The episode was written by executive producer John Carcieri, executive producer Jeff Fradley, and series creator Danny McBride, and directed by executive producer Jody Hill. This was Carcieri's 17th writing credit, Fradley's eleventh writing credit, McBride's 26th writing credit, and Hill's 13th directing credit.

=== Writing ===
Danny McBride said he wanted a complete story with the season, tying loose ends and not setting up any potential future seasons. He said, "One of the worst parts about television is the idea that people don't feel confident in telling a complete story in a season. They really have to rely on what comes next to get people to tune in. And to me, I personally like don't like that when I watch a show."

=== Filming ===
Production designer Richard Wright created the set for Baby Billy's Bible Bonkers. Walton Goggins expressed satisfaction with the set and his performance, saying, "I was overcome, really, with excitement and joy. It's about an eight-minute take. It was as if we had a three-camera setup, and they called 'action,' and the announcer came on, and then we came out and we did the dance number, and we went right into what Danny had written. It was euphoric. I can't believe that I'm not doing Baby Billy's Bible Bonkers right now. I can't believe it's not my real job."

== Reception ==
=== Viewers ===
In its original American broadcast, "Wonders That Cannot Be Fathomed, Miracles That Cannot Be Counted" was seen by an estimated 0.214 million household viewers with a 0.06 in the 18-49 demographics. This means that 0.06 percent of all households with televisions watched the episode. This was a slight decrease in viewership from the previous episode, which was watched by 0.227 million household viewers with a 0.07 in the 18-49 demographics.

=== Critical reviews ===
"Wonders That Cannot Be Fathomed, Miracles That Cannot Be Counted" received near critical acclaim. Matt Schimkowitz of The A.V. Club gave the episode an "A–" grade and wrote, "The proper season finale, 'Wonders That Cannot Be Fathomed, Miracles That Cannot Be Counted,' offers just that: wonders and miracles. With the episode's centerpiece being a literal act of God, The Righteous Gemstones finally lives up to its name and then some."

Scott Tobias of Vulture gave the episode a 3 star rating out of 5 and wrote, "the holy intervention that wraps up season three without a cliffhanger feels unfortunately like a clunky deus exmachina here. The Righteous Gemstones had gotten itself into a narrative tangle, and the locusts give the show a super-mega-happy ending that seems more touched by scriptwriters than touched by an angel."

Breeze Riley of Telltale TV gave the episode a 5 star rating out of 5 and wrote, "The appearance of Aimee-Leigh's ghost in this scene should be cringe, but we've already seen her as a cheesy hologram. So in a way, her actual ghost showing up and fondly looking over how far her family has come provides the sweetest closing note on a season where her absence is an underlying theme." Hawk Ripjaw of TV Obsessive wrote, "I absolutely loved this season. The Righteous Gemstones is an outstanding comedy and Danny McBride's best series to date, and not just for its searingly funny and vulgar humor. McBride's vision for a wide-spanning familial tapestry works extremely well, adding new characters and giving more substance to the ones we already know, and making us care for all of them. It deftly balances the comedy, surrealism, tension, action and emotion, and does so with a surprising respect for religion."
