= You Hurled Me Into the Very Heart of the Seas =

- The Righteous Gemstones episode
- Episode no.: Season 4 Episode 2
- Directed by: Jody Hill
- Written by: John Carcieri; Jeff Fradley; Danny McBride
- Cinematography by: Paul Daley
- Editing by: Todd Zelin
- Original release date: March 16, 2025
- Running time: 36 minutes

Guest appearances
- Valyn Hall as Tiffany Freeman; Megan Mullally as Lori Milsap; Walton Goggins as Baby Billy Freeman; Kelton DuMont as Pontius Gemstone; Gavin Munn as Abraham Gemstone; Patti Tippo; James DuMont as Chad; Jody Hill as Levi; Troy Anthony Hogan as Matthew; J. Larose as Gregory

Episode chronology
← Previous "Prelude"	Next → "To Grieve Like the Rest of Men Who Have No Hope"

"You Hurled Me Into the Depths, Into the Very Heart of the Seas" is the second episode of the fourth season of the American dark comedy crime television series The Righteous Gemstones. It is the 29th overall episode of the series and was written by executive producer John Carcieri, executive producer Jeff Fradley, and series creator Danny McBride, and directed by executive producer Jody Hill. It was released on HBO on March 16, 2025, and also was available on Max on the same date.

The series follows a family of televangelists and megachurch pastors led by widowed patriarch Eli Gemstone. The main focus is Eli and his immature children, Jesse, Kelvin and Judy, all of whom face challenges in their lives. The series depicts the family's past and scandals, which unleash consequences. In the episode, the Gemstones try to locate a missing Elijah for a telethon.

According to Nielsen Media Research, the episode was seen by an estimated 0.264 million household viewers and gained a 0.05 ratings share among adults aged 18–49. The episode received mostly positive reviews from critics, who praised its humor, performances and character development.

== Plot ==
Jesse (Danny McBride), Judy (Edi Patterson) and Kelvin (Adam DeVine) participate in a rehearsal for the "Aimee-Leigh Birthday Celebration Give-A-Thon", hosted by Baby Billy (Walton Goggins). However, during their attempt to lift up, the Gemstones' jet packs malfunction and ruin part of the set. Billy scolds them and demands that they find Eli, who has gone missing for the past few days, as he is vital to the Give-A-Thon's success.

Eli (John Goodman) has moved to Florida, living in a yacht where he drinks alcohol and has sex with strangers. Jesse, Judy and Kelvin arrive to get him to take part in the telethon, but Eli refuses, feeling he needs time to consider what he truly wants in life. Nevertheless, they force him to change his mind after repeating the word "pussy" to annoy him. BJ (Tim Baltz) now attends pole dancing classes, although Judy feels jealous of his female colleagues. Kelvin and Keefe (Tony Cavalero) have embraced their relationship and formed a new church program named "Prism", although Keefe wishes they would finally marry or kiss in public. The Gemstones have also launched "Prayer Pods" to the market, but sales are incredibly low.

Billy surprises the family by bringing Lori Milsap (Megan Mullally), Aimee-Leigh's long-time musical partner. She and Eli bond, reminiscing over their experiences with Aimee-Leigh. During the telethon, Eli is amazed upon seeing Lori singing, and has a flirtatious encounter with her backstage. After a cordial goodbye with Lori, Eli changes his mind and rushes out to the parking lot, where he surprises her by kissing her, and she kisses back. Jesse, Judy and Kelvin finally use the jet packs with success, but Jesse decides to defy orders and rises higher than expected. He approaches a gigantic disco ball near the ceiling, amazing the audience.

== Production ==
=== Development ===
The episode was written by executive producer John Carcieri, executive producer Jeff Fradley, and series creator Danny McBride, and directed by executive producer Jody Hill. This was Carcieri's 19th writing credit, Fradley's 13th writing credit, McBride's 28th writing credit, and Hill's 14th directing credit.

=== Filming ===
For the scene where Baby Billy exposes himself naked to Jesse, Judy and Kelvin, Walton Goggins was offered the option of getting naked, but he declined. He said, "We've done lot of chaotic things over the course of our 12-year collaboration; I will follow Danny McBride anywhere — except there. That's one thing I won't do. Danny McBride commented, "The beautiful thing about Walton is that he's never shown his actual penis on the show. It's always a stunt double penis. Another fun fact: it's never the same penis. We've cast different elderly penises — or Peni — for all his scenes."

Tim Baltz did his own stunts for his character's pole dancing, saying "I was excited, because it felt like an evolution of the character; I felt like each season there was something more ridiculous that BJ was getting into. It made perfect sense that this was the hobby, but I wasn't prepared for it, so I just started pounding creatine and training hard."

== Reception ==
=== Viewers ===
In its original American broadcast, "You Hurled Me Into the Depths, Into the Very Heart of the Seas" was seen by an estimated 0.264 million household viewers with a 0.05 in the 18-49 demographics. This means that 0.05 percent of all households with televisions watched the episode. This was a slight decrease in viewership from the previous episode, which was watched by 0.291 million household viewers with a 0.06 in the 18-49 demographics.

=== Critical reviews ===
"You Hurled Me Into the Depths, Into the Very Heart of the Seas" received mostly positive reviews from critics. Matt Schimkowitz of The A.V. Club gave the episode an "A–" grade and wrote, "Not to be hyperbolic, but tonight's Righteous Gemstones was the funniest 36 minutes in television history. Okay, I won't go that far, but it was a series high. There wasn't a single punchline that didn't hit, a costume choice (or lack thereof) that wasn't a godsend, or a needle drop that was out of place. “You Hurled Me Into the Depths, Into the Very Heart Of The Seas” launches the final season's story out of the deep and finds the production confidently and hilariously ascending toward that big disco ball in the sky."

Scott Tobias of Vulture gave the episode a 4 star rating out of 5 and wrote, "As lowbrow laughs go, there's nothing funnier than full-frontal male nudity, and there's certainly no funnier moment than Baby Billy dropping his drawers in front of the Gemstones in the dressing room after their rehearsal goes awry. “Behold, look at this. That's my privates right there.” Indeed so."

Paul Dailly of TV Fanatic gave the episode a 4.15 star rating out of 5 and wrote, "After feeling a little short-changed about excluding characters we've grown to love from The Righteous Gemstones Season 4 Episode 1, the follow-up made up for it in a big way." Hawk Ripjaw of TV Obsessive wrote, "After last week’s compelling prelude episode that focused on the advent of the family, The Righteous Gemstones S4E2, “You Hurled Me Into the Depths, Into the Very Heart of the Seas,“ catches us up with the Gemstones proper, as the family prepares for a birthday telethon to honor the late Aimee-Leigh. And, as expected, the return to the modern Gemstone shenanigans is as hilarious as it’s ever been."
