= I Have Not Come to Bring Peace, But a Sword =

- The Righteous Gemstones episode
- Episode no.: Season 3 Episode 4
- Directed by: Jody Hill
- Written by: John Carcieri; Danny McBride
- Cinematography by: Paul Daley
- Editing by: Joseph Ettinger
- Original release date: July 2, 2023
- Running time: 36 minutes

Guest appearances
- Kristen Johnston as May–May Montgomery; Lukas Haas as Chuck Montgomery; Valyn Hall as Tiffany Freeman; Stephen Dorff as Vance Simkins; Steve Zahn as Peter Montgomery; Walton Goggins as Baby Billy Freeman; Kelton DuMont as Pontius Gemstone; Gavin Munn as Abraham Gemstone; Jody Hill as Levi; Robert Oberst as Karl Montgomery; Stephen Schneider as Stephen; Maggie Winters as Taryn

Episode chronology
← Previous "For Their Nakedness Is Your Own Nakedness"	Next → "Interlude III"

"I Have Not Come to Bring Peace, But a Sword" is the fourth episode of the third season of the American dark comedy crime television series The Righteous Gemstones. It is the 22nd overall episode of the series and was written by executive producer John Carcieri and series creator Danny McBride, and directed by executive producer Jody Hill. It was released on HBO on July 2, 2023, and also was available on Max on the same date.

The series follows a family of televangelists and megachurch pastors led by widowed patriarch Eli Gemstone. The main focus is Eli and his immature children, Jesse, Kelvin and Judy, all of whom face challenges in their lives. The series depicts the family's past and scandals, which unleash consequences. In the episode, the Gemstones face new challenges as things start affecting each of the siblings.

According to Nielsen Media Research, the episode was seen by an estimated 0.256 million household viewers and gained a 0.05 ratings share among adults aged 18–49. The episode received very positive reviews from critics, who praised the revelations, character development and humor.

== Plot ==
Eli (John Goodman) gets May–May (Kristen Johnston), Karl (Robert Oberst) and Chuck (Lukas Haas) to attend the Salvation Center, hoping they can integrate with the family. During their dinner, they are visited by Peter (Steve Zahn). Peter claims he found the real traitor in his militia, and wants the boys to return with him. They reject him, and Peter is forced to leave when the family threatens him at gunpoint.

Jesse (Danny McBride) has joined Eli at the Cape and Pistol Society. During the reception, Vance (Stephen Dorff), also member of the society, accuses Jesse of only entering through his father's influence rather than his merits. This makes Jesse swear, causing him to be slapped as punishment for using vulgarity on the society's grounds. Outside, he finds Baby Billy (Walton Goggins), who wants to find his way into the society to get someone to invest in Bible Bonkers. He then confronts Jesse, telling him he will never lead the Church as he is not Eli. He offers to "resurrect" Aimee-Leigh to help him, but Jesse rebuffs his claims.

Keefe (Tony Cavalero) faces a problem, when a friend of his exposes him as having bought sex toys from a porn shop, in front of the youth center's parents. Kelvin (Adam DeVine) tries to clean up his name, but the parents refuse to accept him, especially with circulating rumors about Kelvin and Keefe. Stephen (Stephen Schneider) tries to contact Judy (Edi Patterson), threatening to reveal their affair to B.J. (Tim Baltz). He even gets to interact with B.J. by becoming his pickleball teammate. He offends B.J. by making sexually suggestive comments about women and assaults one of his friends before leaving.

Jesse and Judy inform Kelvin that Keefe will be fired from his position and sent to a lower position, fearing a PR nightmare could damage the church's image. Kelvin is forced to deliver the news to Keefe, who chooses to quit the church and move out of their house. Judy meets with Stephen to stop harassing her and B.J., only to discover that B.J. is also present. Stephen forces her to reveal their affair, which devastates B.J. Jesse also meets with Billy at Zion's Landing, who reveals that he could bring Aimee-Leigh (Jennifer Nettles) back through a hologram form. That night, Karl and Chuck retrieve bags of ammonium nitrate from the warehouse and deliver it to Peter, revealing they are conspiring against the Gemstones.

== Production ==
=== Development ===
The episode was written by executive producer John Carcieri and series creator Danny McBride, and directed by executive producer Jody Hill. This was Carcieri's 13th writing credit, McBride's 22nd writing credit, and Hill's 11th directing credit.

== Reception ==
=== Viewers ===
In its original American broadcast, "I Have Not Come to Bring Peace, But a Sword" was seen by an estimated 0.256 million household viewers with a 0.05 in the 18-49 demographics. This means that 0.05 percent of all households with televisions watched the episode. This was a slight increase in viewership from the previous episode, which was watched by 0.219 million household viewers with a 0.05 in the 18-49 demographics.

=== Critical reviews ===
"I Have Not Come to Bring Peace, But a Sword" received very positive reviews from critics. Matt Schimkowitz of The A.V. Club gave the episode a "B" grade and wrote, "After last week's surprising dip into the warm waters of Cousins Night, the future was looking so bright, the Gemstones gotta wear shades. Yet, from the jump, 'I Have Not Come To Bring Peace, But A Sword' tips its hand toward a reckoning. Now we know: The goodwill forged in 'For Their Nakedness Is Your Nakedness' hid a rotten core at the heart of the Gemstones, and it was laid bare this evening."

Scott Tobias of Vulture gave the episode a perfect 5 star rating out of 5 and wrote, "It seems like only a week ago I was regaling the Gemstones' ability to come together as a family, despite grudges and betrayals and brow-scorching insults that would end other relationships. And now, this week, a fresh round of betrayals either begins the cycle anew or snaps a tree's worth of olive branches in half. The Righteous Gemstones had spent the first three episodes carefully building out a season where Eli Gemstone has finally handed over his empire to his children — the ultimate act of blind faith, to be sure, but also an act of trust. The fourth and best episode so far harmonizes the trust theme across multiple timelines and considers the consequences for nearly every major character in the cast." Breeze Riley of Telltale TV gave the episode a 4 star rating out of 5 and wrote, "In the time we've known them, we've seen the Gemstones get wrapped up in extortion, assassination attempts, and now domestic terrorism thanks to the cousins double-crossing them. God only knows how they'll handle it but I'm guessing it will be in the goofiest nonsensical way possible."

=== Accolades ===
TVLine named Edi Patterson as an honorable mention as the "Performer of the Week" for the week of July 8, 2023, for her performance in the episode. The site wrote, "As the delightfully unhinged Judy Gemstone, Edi Patterson has long been The Righteous Gemstones' secret weapon, armed with off-kilter line readings and an oddball physicality that make Judy such a watchable weirdo. That held especially true during Sunday's episode, in which Judy tried to shield husband BJ from the knowledge that she'd had an affair while on tour. As Judy's ex-lover, Stephen, threatened to spill the beans to BJ, Patterson made increasingly hilarious choices, from Judy's frantic deleting of Stephen's text messages to the seamless way she spat out her water upon learning that BJ and Stephen played pickleball together. Judy's eventual confrontation with Stephen was the perfect cap to Patterson's showcase; in her hands, even a ridiculous declaration like, 'I'm BJ Barnes' bitch, and no one else's!' was both very funny and strangely sweet."
