= You Shall Remember =

- The Righteous Gemstones episode
- Episode no.: Season 4 Episode 5
- Directed by: Jody Hill
- Written by: John Carcieri; Jeff Fradley; Danny McBride
- Cinematography by: Paul Daley
- Editing by: Todd Zelin
- Original release date: April 6, 2025
- Running time: 36 minutes

Guest appearances
- Seann William Scott as Corey Milsap; Valyn Hall as Tiffany Freeman; Stephen Dorff as Vance Simkins; Steve Little as Jacob Jones; Megan Mullally as Lori Milsap; Walton Goggins as Baby Billy Freeman; Kelton DuMont as Pontius Gemstone; Gavin Munn as Abraham Gemstone; Kerstin Schulze as Sola; Gogo Lomo-David as Craig Simkins; Mike Britt as Reggie Daniels; James DuMont as Chad; Jody Hill as Levi; Troy Anthony Hogan as Matthew; J. Larose as Gregory

Episode chronology
← Previous "He Goeth Before You Into Galilee"	Next → "Interlude IV"

"You Shall Remember" is the fifth episode of the fourth season of the American dark comedy crime television series The Righteous Gemstones. It is the 32nd overall episode of the series and was written by executive producer John Carcieri, executive producer Jeff Fradley, and series creator Danny McBride, and directed by executive producer Jody Hill. It was released on HBO on April 6, 2025, and also was available on Max on the same date.

The series follows a family of televangelists and megachurch pastors led by widowed patriarch Eli Gemstone. The main focus is Eli and his immature children, Jesse, Kelvin and Judy, all of whom face challenges in their lives. The series depicts the family's past and scandals, which unleash consequences. In the episode, Vance Simkins seek retribution against the Gemstones, while the siblings delve into Lori's past.

According to Nielsen Media Research, the episode was seen by an estimated 0.276 million household viewers and gained a 0.05 ratings share among adults aged 18–49. The episode received generally positive reviews from critics, who praised the performances and character development, although some criticized the pacing.

== Plot ==
Finding one of his burned ministry centers, Vance (Stephen Dorff) is irate, knowing that the Gemstones were involved. At his office, he talks with his brother Craig (Gogo Lomo-David), scolding him for over-spending his money. He declares his intentions on winning the "Top Christ Following Man of the Year" award, and fights Craig when he expresses doubt.

During a party, the siblings have a bad encounter with Lori (Megan Mullally), and are further disgusted when she suggests that she and Eli (John Goodman) might have married already. Judy (Edi Patterson) struggles in helping BJ (Tim Baltz), as he is unwilling to seek therapy treatment. Amber (Cassidy Freeman) helps her by getting her a capuchin monkey, Dr. Watson, hoping this could serve as a service animal for BJ. At the Cape and Pistol Society, Jesse (Danny McBride) is threatened by Vance. Jesse ignores him, and instead humiliates Vance even further in front of other members.

Jesse, Judy and Kelvin (Adam DeVine) discover that Lori was seen constantly with multiple men, all of which have been reported either missing or dead. To learn more, they consult with Baby Billy (Walton Goggins), who will only divulge information if they greenlight his TV pitch Teenjus, a show about a teenage Jesus. They reluctantly agree, and Billy explains that Lori contacted him to appear in Aimee-Leigh's anniversary telethon as she was broke, suggesting she is with Eli for his money. The siblings reveal this to Eli, who refuses to believe it and warns them to step aside.

At the Top Christ Following Man of the Year ceremony, the nominees engage in a debate over multiple subject matters. Vance uses the opportunity to question Kelvin's nomination, feeling that he is included solely because of his homosexuality, embarrassing Kelvin on the air. Judy returns home and finds that BJ has grown attached to Dr. Watson, and apologizes for his behavior. While Eli stays over at Lori's house, a brick smashes the window with the word "Sinners" written, and they also find Eli's car on fire. Lori tells Eli that she has not been honest with him, and that they must talk about her ex.

== Production ==
=== Development ===
The episode was written by executive producer John Carcieri, executive producer Jeff Fradley, and series creator Danny McBride, and directed by executive producer Jody Hill. This was Carcieri's 22nd writing credit, Fradley's 16th writing credit, McBride's 32nd writing credit, and Hill's 15th directing credit.

== Reception ==
=== Viewers ===
In its original American broadcast, "You Shall Remember" was seen by an estimated 0.276 million household viewers with a 0.05 in the 18-49 demographics. This means that 0.05 percent of all households with televisions watched the episode. This was a 27% decrease in viewership from the previous episode, which was watched by 0.375 million household viewers with a 0.09 in the 18-49 demographics.

=== Critical reviews ===
"You Shall Remember" received generally positive reviews from critics. Matt Schimkowitz of The A.V. Club gave the episode a "B–" grade and wrote, "Though “You Shall Remember” may be a touch forgettable as it transitions from the first half of the season into the second, doubling back to Vance to give Kelvin some conflict, it nevertheless delivers enough oddness and distinctive comedy to keep it feeling like every other show about rich idiots. God really does have the Gemstones' backs."

Scott Tobias of Vulture gave the episode a 3 star rating out of 5 and wrote, "tonight's episode of The Righteous Gemstones has to do a lot of table-setting for the final stretch, which might account for why it's a shade less inspired than usual. Not that it doesn't have plenty of fun on the margins, but the gears of the plot have to grind a little to set up confrontations to come."

Robert Pitman of Screen Rant wrote, "By continuing episode 3's rivalry between Jesse Gemstone and Vance Simkins with Jesse, Judy, and Kelvin's attempts to break Eli and Lori up in episode 4, episode 5 moves the story forward more than any of the previous episodes. This is the right call for the show, as episode 4's decision to ignore the cliffhanger ending of Vance Simkins' church getting burned down was controversial. However, the fact that any of these stories were in episode 5 is surprising to many." Hawk Ripjaw of TV Obsessive wrote, "Now things are really starting to get interesting. If Lori's been hiding the details of her ex (Big D*ck Mitch, or someone else?), what else is she not being as forthcoming about? And if Corey is the one behind the disappearances of Lori's exes, who threw the brick? Could be more than one person causing turmoil behind the scenes, of course, but hopefully next week we'll find out more."
