= Zaragoza (disambiguation) =

Zaragoza or Saragossa is a city in Spain.

Zaragoza may also refer to:

== Places ==
=== Mexico ===
- Zaragoza Municipality, Coahuila
- Zaragoza, Chiapas, a locality in Ocosingo
- Ignacio Zaragoza, Chihuahua
  - Ignacio Zaragoza (municipality)
- Zaragoza, Puebla
- Zaragoza, San Luis Potosí
- Zaragoza, Veracruz

=== Spain ===
- Zaragoza, Aragón
- Zaragoza (province), Aragón
  - Zaragoza (Spanish Congress Electoral District)
- Zaragoza (comarca), Aragón

=== Other places ===
- Zaragoza Municipality, Antioquia, Colombia
- Zaragoza, La Libertad, El Salvador
- Zaragoza, Chimaltenango, Guatemala
- Zaragoza, Moyobamba, a neighborhood in Moyobamba, Peru
- Zaragoza, Nueva Ecija, Philippines

== People with the surname ==
- Daniel Zaragoza (born 1957), Mexican boxing champion
- Federico Mayor Zaragoza (born 1934), Spanish scholar, politician, Head of UNESCO
- Ignacio Zaragoza (1829–1862), Mexican military commander of the 19th century
- Jessa Zaragoza (born 1979), Filipina model, singer and actress
- Raye Zaragoza (born 1996), American singer
- Román Zaragoza (born 1996), American actor
- Steve Zaragoza (born 1982), American comedian, actor, and internet personality

== Events ==
- Siege of Zaragoza (1808)
- Siege of Zaragoza (1809)

== Naval vessels ==
- Mexican corvette Zaragoza, a Mexican Navy ship
- Spanish ship Zaragoza, various Spanish Navy ships

== Transportation ==
- Zaragoza–Delicias railway station, Spain
- Zaragoza metro station (Mexico City), Mexico
- General I. Zaragoza metro station, Monterrey, Mexico

== Other uses ==
- Real Zaragoza, a football club from Spain
- Zaragoza, a Mesoamerican obsidian source in Mexico, see obsidian use in Mesoamerica

== See also ==
- Saragossa (disambiguation)
- Sargasso (disambiguation)
