= Thom Harp =

American screenwriter and director

- Education: Occidental College
- Known for: Writer and Director
- Notable work: The Donor Party, Home Delivery
- Website: https://www.thomharp.com

Thom Harp is an American screenwriter and director. His movies include 2023's The Donor Party and 2025's Home Delivery. He was co-producer and co-writer on 2021's fictional podcast Dark Air with Terry Carnation starring Rainn Wilson.

== Early life and education ==
Harp's father was in the Navy and Harp was born on base. Harp went to Occidental College, where Chick Strand and Esther Yao were a few of his professors. Harp graduated in 1992, with a double major in film and theater.

== Career ==
After graduating college, Harp and his wife relocated to Alaska, and then to Seattle, where he began writing and directing short films. In 2003, Harp met Mike Standish at a scripting-pitching event at the Seattle International Film Festival. In 2004, Harp directed the short films, 8 Minutes to Love, written by Jennifer Matte and starring Sandra Oh and Afternoon Delight, written by Harp and edited by Lynn Shelton. In 2005, they co-wrote Driver's Ed, which Harp directed, eventually streaming on Funny or Die. They also co-wrote 2007's Fortune Hunters starring Gedde Watanabe. In 2013, Harp directed Profiles In Excellence: Phil Ma, Fortune Cookie Writer starring Randall Park and Dominic Burgess.

Beginning in 2016, Harp directed numerous shorts for Funny or Die like How to Apply For A Sexual Position, starring Alison Becker and Justine Bateman, which was co-written by Becker and Harp.

In 2021, Harp co-produced the fictional podcast, Dark Air with Terry Carnation starring Rainn Wilson for SoulPancake. He told the podcast 39 Minute Conversations that two weeks before the onset of the pandemic, their writer's room kicked off, which included Harp, Danielle Koenig, Mark Loughlin and co-creators Aaron Lee, and Rainn Wilson. They produced the series over Zoom during the first year of the pandemic.

In 2023, Harp's first feature was released, The Donor Party. It starred Malin Akerman, Erinn Hayes, Rob Corddry, Ryan Hansen, and Jerry O'Connell. It was distributed by Vertical Entertainment. Its casting director, Anthony J. Kraus, was nominated for an Artios Award in the Feature Micro Budget Comedy or Drama category for this film.

Home Delivery was released March 2026. It was a sixteen day shoot and was dedicated to director Lynn Shelton, who had given him pivotal advice at the start of their careers in Seattle, telling him, "You should be in one location for that whole day—you lose several hours loading up the truck again and moving to the next location. If everything happens over the course of a day, then it’ll help with the costume changes and the hair continuity.’” It starred Donald Faison, Melanie Field, Lindsay Sloane, Jimmi Simpson, Joe Pantoliano, Lesley Ann Warren, Peter MacNicol, Tracie Thoms and Rainn Wilson. He worked with casting director Lisa Zagoria, and revealed that he'd had a crush on Warren when he was a kid.

== Personal ==
Harp met his wife in college. They have three children.

Harp appeared on Chris Gore's Film Threat podcast, and told Gore and co-host Alan Ng that David Lynch was his hero, switching to making comedic films after the birth of his first child. Harp discussed his approach to comedy, explaining how "you can't punch down so you don't bully anyone in your comedy" and "the moment that you can get people to laugh at themselves then it starts to break the walls down. So, that's really what I'm trying to do is to find the ways that we're similar to each other and make fun of that in the nicest way." He also complimented Gore at the top and bottom of the podcast.

== Filmography ==
Year	Title	Format	Role	Cast	Ref.
2004	Afternoon Delight	Short	Director, Writer	Starring Jen Nikolaisen, Jason Stafford	
2004	8 Minutes to Love	Short	Director	Starring Sandra Oh; Written by Jennifer Matte	
2005	Driver's Ed	Short	Director, Co-writer	Starring Jessica Skerritt, Tony Doup; Co-written by Mike Standish	
2007	Fortune Hunters	Short	Director, Co-writer	Starring Gedde Waranabe, Kelvin Yu, Jessica Skerritt; Co-written by Mike Standish	
2016	Profiles in Excellence	Funny or Die Digital Short	Director, Writer	Starring Randall Park, Dominic Burgess; Produced by Jessica Green and SoulPancake	
2016	Exit Survey	Short	Director, Co-writer	Starring Kim Shaw, Blake Cooper Griffin, Kandis Lewis; Co-written by Kris Carey	
2017	Mulva Lends A Hand	Funny or Die Digital Short	Director, Writer	Starring Erica Rhodes, Elisha Yaffe	
2017	How to Apply for a Sexual Position	Funny or Die Digital Short	Director, Co-writer	Starring Alison Becker, Justine Bateman; Co-written by Alison Becker	
2017	Heavy Flow	Short	Director, Writer	Starring Kate Morgan Chadwick, Jeff Torres	
2017	Killer Charm	Short	Director, Co-writer	Starring Blake Cooper Griffin, Sheilla Carrasco, Jesse Burch; Co-written by Kris Carey	
2022	Unbridled	Short	Writer	Directed by Chelsea B. Lockie; Starring Caitlin Simpson, Mischa Dani Goodman	
2023	The Donor Party	Feature	Director, Writer	Starring Malin Akerman, Jerry O'Connell, Rob Corddry	
2025	Home Delivery	Feature	Director, Writer	Starring Lesley Ann Warren, Melanie Field, Rainn Wilson, Joe Pantoliano, Donald Faison, Jimmi Simpson	

== External ==
- Thom Harp website
