= Saragosa =

Saragosa may refer to:

- Manuela Saragosa
- Marcelo Saragosa
- Saragosa, Texas

== See also ==
- Saragossa (disambiguation)
