= ImprovBoston =

Nonprofit improvisational theater

Coordinates: 42°21′57.9″N 71°6′12.1″W

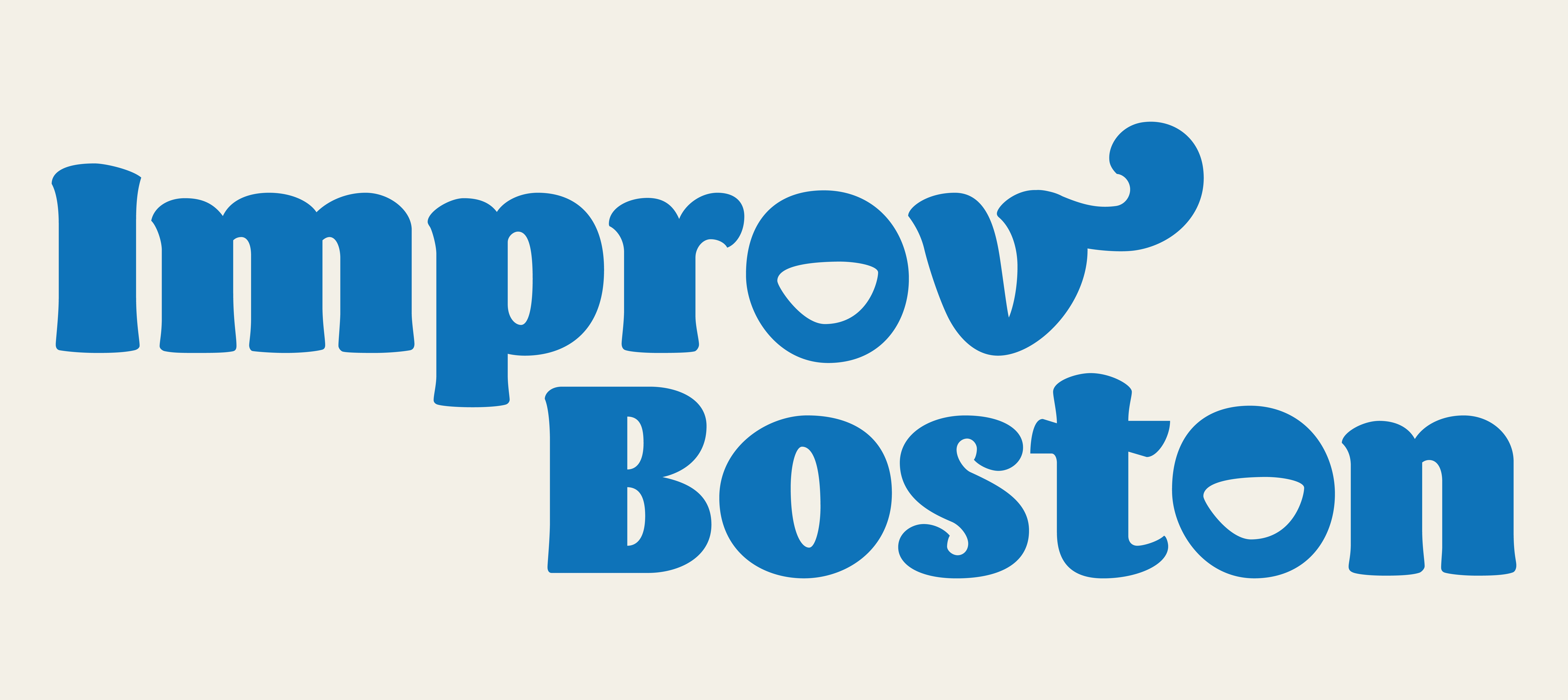
- Company type: Nonprofit
- Founded: Cambridge, Massachusetts, U.S. (January 1, 1982)
- Founder: Ellen Holbrook
- Headquarters: 620 Mass Ave; Cambridge, Massachusetts
- Website: Official Site

ImprovBoston was a nonprofit improvisational theater, based in Cambridge, Massachusetts. It offered shows and classes at its theater in Central Square.

== History ==
=== Founding 1982–1993 ===
In 1982, Ellen Holbrook, a former student at The Second City in Chicago and a producer of the Chicago Improv Olympic, assembled and trained several loosely knit bands of improvisers into teams that competed in the Boston "Improv Olympic" at Reilly's Beef and Pub near Government Center. Holbrook also arranged for David Shepherd and Second City's Michael Gellman to come to Boston to teach improv workshops to local performers. In 1983, Nicholas Emanuel and Katy Bolger co-founded ImprovBoston, along with Holbrook, to reflect a more commercial direction for the organization. With Emanuel's connections, the group moved to Satch's near Copley Square, owned by former Boston Celtic Satch Sanders. In 1984, ImprovBoston became a not-for-profit corporation and moved to Ryles Jazz Club in Cambridge at Inman Square, where they remained for several years. Show formats varied but often included several improv games based on audience suggestions, set sketches based on improvs from past shows, musical improvs and song parodies. ImprovBoston troupe members often took turns directing shows, but other ImprovBoston directors during this time included David Thibodeaux, Jack O'Connor, Leslie Curtin and Brad Jones.

=== 1993–2000 ===
In 1993, under the leadership of Artistic Director Nancy Howland Walker, ImprovBoston acquired a lease to the Back Alley Theater in Inman Square - ImprovBoston's first dedicated theatre space. The ImprovBoston Mainstage cast performed late night weekend shows for several years, eventually expanding to prime time slots. Walker was just as instrumental in obtaining the New England franchise of Theatersports, which eventually became a regular Thursday night show at the theater. During Walker's tenure, the cast grew from five to well over 20 members. Larry Pizza became Artistic Director in 1995 and, in 1997, the artistic leadership again transferred, this time to Ron Jones, a former cast member from the early 1990s. The theater began to extend its reach to further aspects of improvisation, creating new formats and shows beyond the traditional shortform game format the theater used for their Friday and Saturday night shows.

=== 2000-2008 ===
In 2000, former cast member Will Luera returned to ImprovBoston as the new Artistic Director, bringing with him several show concepts and forms he had established under the banner of Bluescreen Productions (a different improv theater he had established in Davis Square). This merger saw a third cast added to the ImprovBoston line-up, as ImprovBoston was granted the rights to Keith Johnstone's Micetro format. The theater's cast was again expanded in 2005 when the ensemble "Wrong Kind of Funny" was brought into what eventually formed IB's Family Show. In February 2008, ImprovBoston moved to a new venue in Cambridge's Central Square.

Luera was responsible for the theater's most aggressive expansion, with several new shows, concepts, and formats established; and for keeping the theater doors open on five nights each week. The Hump on Wednesday nights (improv fringe), The Great and Secret Comedy Show late Thursdays (stand-up comedy hosted by the Walsh Brothers), bi-monthly Showcase Shows in the early Friday night slot (newly created and designed improv shows in various genres or formats), and the Sgt. Culpepper Improvisational Jamboree on Sunday nights (two short shows featuring independent and college troupes from around the area, followed by an audience-participation "Open Jam").

ImprovBoston also established new annual productions including GoreFest (a scripted horror musical every October that involves copious amounts of fake blood and special effects), The ImprovBoston Holiday Spectacular (a holiday-themed sketch show), the Comedy Beanpot (an improv tournament hosted by ImprovBoston that involves college troupes from around the New England area).

In the past, ImprovBoston has also hosted The, Geekweek, Comedy Beanpot (now College Comedy Festival)

In 2010, the theater created an audio department with the intention of producing weekly free podcasts among other audio-only endeavors under the banner of "ImprovBoston Radio". This resulted in the flagship, and also Fireside Improv, a more instruction-oriented look at the comedic form with a panel of improv pupil, professor and philosopher.

=== 2020 to closure ===
In 2020 the theater had to close its doors due to the COVID-19 pandemic. A small team returned in 2021 to revive the theater and bring it back to the post-pandemic Boston Comedy scene. Though without its home theater, the theater continued to host classes in improv, stand up, and sketch writing, weekly, as well as perform on the road in local theaters and performance spaces around Boston. In 2023, ImprovBoston rebranded, updated its website, and renovated an office space across the street from its old location to be a new black box theater space.

In December 2023 ImprovBoston Managing Director Matt Laidlaw announced that it would be closing at the end of 2024 due to financial difficulties.

== Notable alumni ==
- Adam Felber
- Cameron Esposito
- Christopher Nowinski
- Dan Crohn
- Faith Soloway
- Jamie Loftus
- Jen Kirkman
- Jenny Zigrino
- Jessimae Peluso
- Josh Gondelman
- Katie Nolan
- Ken Reid
- Lou Wilson
- Penny Dreadful XIII
- Richie Moriarty
- Rob Crean
- The Walsh Brothers

== See also ==
- Improv Asylum
