= Home Delivery (2026 film) =

2026 American film

- Directed by: Thom Harp
- Written by: Thom Harp
- Produced by: Philippe Palacios; Lundi Shackleton; Rosana Tomas; Pilar de Posadas; Saray Guidetti
- Starring: Donald Faison; Melanie Field; Peter MacNicol; Joe Pantoliano; Jimmi Simpson; Lindsay Sloane; Lesley Ann Warren; Tracie Thoms; Rainn Wilson
- Cinematography: David Vollrath
- Edited by: Noah Harald
- Music by: Simon Bass
- Production companies: Les Espoirs Pictures; Dopamine
- Distributed by: Eagle Entertainment; TriCoast Entertainment
- Release date: March 27, 2026
- Running time: 105 minutes
- Country: United States

Home Delivery is an American comedy film released in 2026, written and directed by Thom Harp. The film stars Donald Faison, Melanie Field, Peter MacNicol, Joe Pantoliano, Jimmi Simpson, Lindsay Sloane, Lesley Ann Warren, Tracie Thoms, Rainn Wilson.

Director Harp said the character of Kevin is loosely based on himself.

Home Delivery was released on March 27, 2026 and was distributed by TriCoast Entertainment. It is now streaming on Tubi.

== Plot ==
Ellye Ferguson is having a home birth and wants her estranged family surrounding her. She is a plus-sized model married to Jimmy Ferguson, who runs a limo service, They are former addicts who met in rehab. Ellye's sister, Amy Messina and husband, Kevin fly in from Denver. Her father, Howard Evans drives in from the desert. And her mother, Linda Templeton is driving in from Lake Tahoe with her husband, Gary Templeton.

Amy and Kevin arrive first and get the tour of Ellye and Jimmy's home. Amy notices their Gramma Evans' china and makes a dig about Ellye not visiting. Amy walks into the baby's nursery, feeling emotional. After they've unpacked, they give Ellye and Jimmy baby presents. When Amy points out that pregnant women are not supposed to eat brie, Ellye has a freakout. Sara, their midwife, calms Ellye down as she measures the contractions and hear the baby's heartbeat. Linda and Gary are the next, and Howard arrives shortly after. Sara unpacks what an orgasmic birth will entail. Howard informs everyone he will be shooting the birth, which Linda has concerns about. When Ellye's contractions begin to intensify, Sara suggests Ellye get into a warm bath to relax.

While Ellye is in the bath, her contractions stop. Ellye wants to know if there is anything she can do to speed up the baby's arrival, Sara suggests they have sex. However, this does not stop the contractions. At the end of the day, as Sara leaves, she reminds Linda to be more supportive because Ellye doesn't need any of them here. The family watches home movies and some old footage of Linda being sexy appears. While everyone winds down, Jimmy and Kevin get in the hot tub, and Kevin finds out that Linda and Gary will be moving to Los Angeles to help Ellye with the baby, which infuriates Amy.

The following morning, the family has a tense breakfast. Kevin overhears Ellye talking to her friend about how Amy doesn't seem to be very maternal and he runs out to tell everyone that Amy can't get pregnant. Amy tells the whole family that she's had seven miscarriages. Then Amy and Kevin tell the family they have decided to adopt a child.

Jimmy tells Ellye that since labor is stalled and two of his drivers are out sick, he has to go drive Guy Fieri to the Emmys. She's not happy about it. She finds out Kevin and Amy have to leave since the baby isn't coming. Sara comes and confirms labor is stalled. Ellye decides to use a vibrator to jump start the contractions. It works just as Sara gets a call that her husband has been in a car accident and she has to leave. Jimmy finds Cheyenne the midwife off CraigsList and prepares to leave. This sets off a confrontation where all the family tensions surface. Ellye storms out of the house and the family follows her. She goes into labor in a public park, but there is a lot of blood. They all race to the hospital, including Jimmy, who cancelled his job driving Guy Fieri. Because Ellye and Jimmy were planning a home birth, there isn't a doctor on call. Jimmy finds an intern willing to deliver the baby. She calls a code pink and Ellye is wheeled into the delivery room. The baby is born, healthy although Ellye is told she won't be able to give birth to more babies. The whole family unites in the recovery room to welcome the baby who was accidentally named after an American football player that Jimmy acquired in a fantasy football draft.

== Cast ==
- Donald Faison as Jimmy Ferguson
- Melanie Field as Ellye Ferguson
- Tracie Thoms as Sara
- Peter MacNicol as Howard Evans
- Lesley Ann Warren as Linda Templeton
- Joe Pantoliano as Gary Templeton
- Lindsay Sloane as Amy Messina
- Jimmi Simpson as Kevin Messina
- Rainn Wilson as Cheyenne
- Sheila Carrasco as Alma Serrano
- Janie Haddad Tompkins as Vonda
- Zehra Fazal as Dr. Faraj
- Keisha Zollar as Admitting Nurse

== Production ==
Home Delivery was shot in Los Angeles. Harp worked with casting director Lisa Zagoria to cast the film. Director Thom Harp told Cocktails and Movies that he'd written the role of Cheyenne the midwife with Rainn Wilson in mind, and that he'd had a crush on Lesley Ann Warren as a kid. In the same interview Harp said "I knew that what we were going to be doing in this movie was having a lot of scenes where eight people were in the room at the same time and I was going to have a microphone attached to each one of them. I wanted people who were not going to just save it for a close-up, who would be there and be generous as actors to one another.

Lesley Anne Warren told TV Insider that she "worked on the script with Thom Harp, the director, with Rainn Wilson before it was even a greenlit movie. We had a table read and worked on the script at that time, and it took several years for them to get the finances together. When they did, it was perfect timing. I was available and really happy to step into that world."

== Reception ==
Film Inquiry noted that Home Delivery "leans into obscenity, awkward honesty, and uncomfortable conversations. Some jokes overstay their welcome, stretching the cringe factor longer than necessary, but the film’s rhythm keeps it from feeling stagnant. Importantly, the discomfort feels intentional: a reflection of just how messy things can get when family is invited into something this personal."

In Western Journal's review of the film, they wrote "the audience is given a multi-layered story with relatable dialogue, colorful camera shots, humor of all types, and, most importantly, it’s obvious that the cast enjoyed themselves."
