= Saragossa (disambiguation) =

Saragossa or Zaragoza is a city in Spain.

Saragossa may also refer to:

== Places ==
- Saragossa, Alabama
- Saragossa (Natchez, Mississippi), listed on the U.S. National Register of Historic Places
- Saragossa de Sicília, a Medieval Catalan exonym for Syracuse, Sicily, Italy.

== People ==
- Valerius of Saragossa (died 315 AD)
- Vincent of Saragossa (died 304 AD)
- José de Palafox y Melzi, Duke of Saragossa (1775–1847)

== Events ==
- Councils of Saragossa, councils of the Church in 380, 592, and 691
- Battle of Saragossa, a battle in 1710 of the War of the Spanish Succession

== Other uses ==
- Saragossa (moth), a moth genus
- Saragossa Opening, an opening in the game of chess
- The Manuscript Found in Saragossa, a novel first published in 1805
- The Saragossa Manuscript, 1965 Polish film based on the novel

== See also ==
- Zaragoza (disambiguation)
- Sargasso (disambiguation)
- Saragosa (disambiguation)
