= Danielle Pinnock =

American actress, comedian and writer

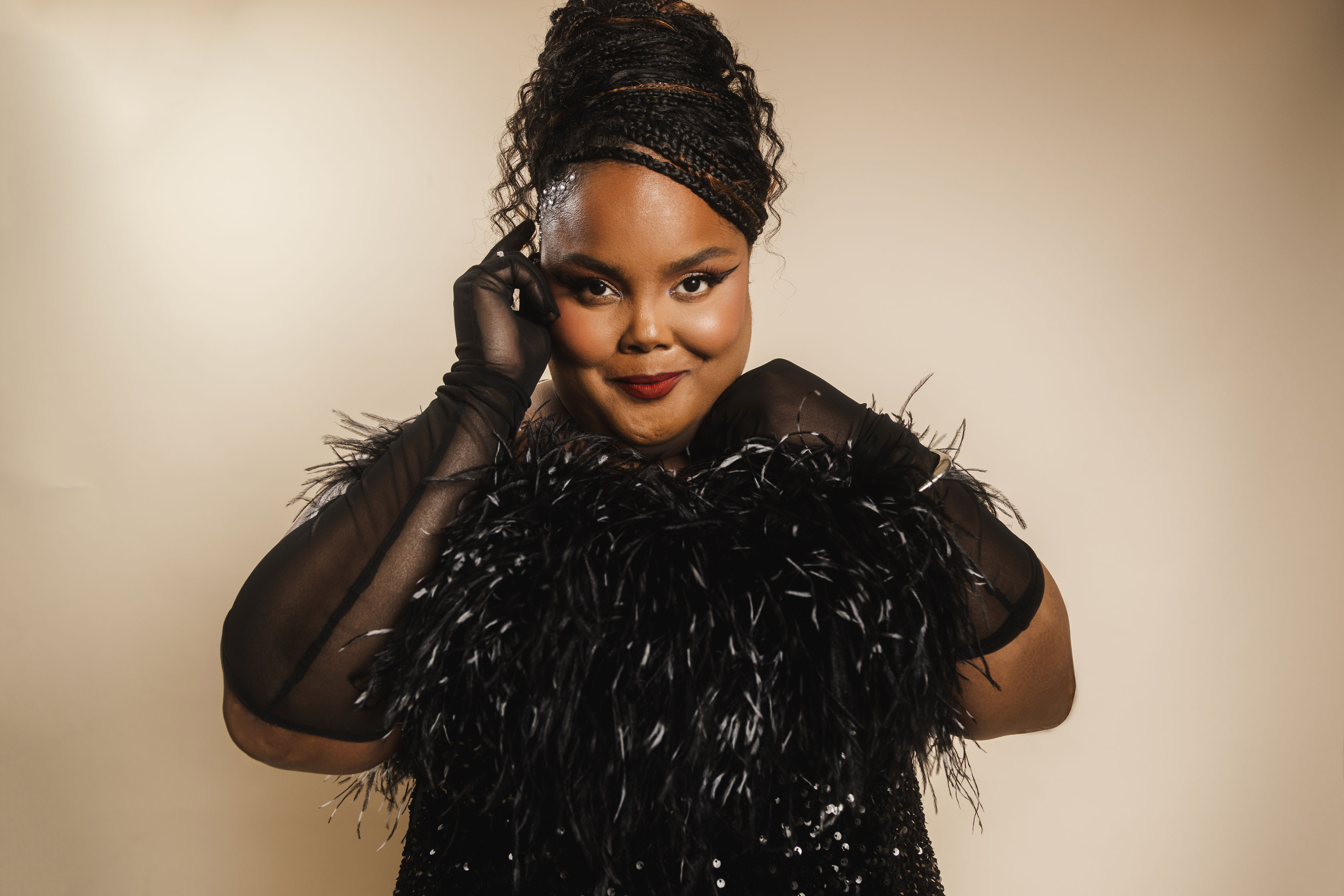
- Pinnock in 2022
- Born: May 11, 1988 (age 38); Boston, Massachusetts, U.S.
- Education: Temple University (BA); Royal Birmingham Conservatoire (MFA)
- Occupations: Actress; comedian; writer
- Years active: 2016–present
- Known for: Young Sheldon, Ghosts
- Spouse: Jack Wallace (m. 2013)

Danielle Pinnock (born May 11, 1988) is an American actress, writer, and comedian. Pinnock won an Astra Television Award and an NAACP Image Award for her performance as a main cast member on the CBS comedy Ghosts (2021–present), where she plays the 1920s Prohibition era jazz singer, Alberta.

She played a supporting role as Ms. Ingram on the CBS comedy Young Sheldon (2017–2020) and has acted in This Is Us, Workaholics, A Black Lady Sketch Show, and others.

== Early life ==
Pinnock was born in Boston, Massachusetts to Jamaican immigrant parents, and from age 10 was raised in Teaneck, New Jersey. At the 51st Daytime Emmy Awards Pinnock said her middle name was Ashley and that she was named for Ashley Abbott of The Young and the Restless.

Beginning in fifth grade, she performed in local theater productions at school and at the Garage Theater Group. In high school at Saddle River Day School, she was active in performing arts activities. Her father died when she was 16.

She received her bachelor's degree in theater and communications from Temple University, and there met fellow student Quinta Brunson. She received her graduate degree in acting from the Royal Birmingham Conservatoire. She interviewed approximately 300 people for her one-woman dissertation show Body/Courage, which centers body image and diet culture, and went on to perform the show over a five-year period. Pinnock later received a fellowship to train in improv and sketch comedy at Second City in Chicago.

== Career ==
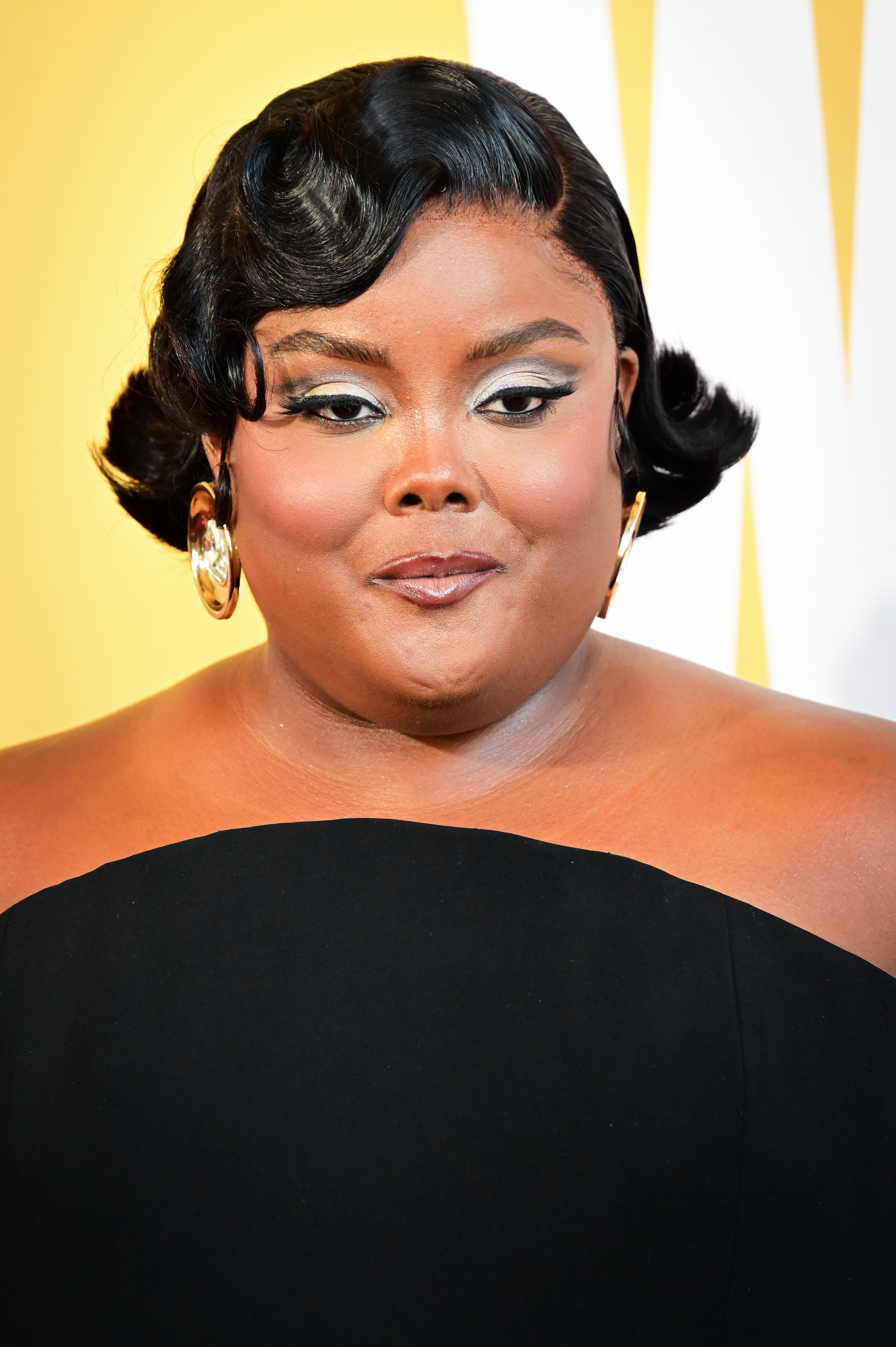
Pinnock in 2026

Pinnock moved to Los Angeles in 2016 and was cast as an understudy for the Robert O'Hara play Barbecue, staged at Geffen Playhouse and directed by Colman Domingo. Shortly after, she was cast in her first television role on NBC's This Is Us. She has also appeared on the series Get Shorty, Workaholics, A Black Lady Sketch Show and done voice acting for the programs The Boss Baby: Back in Business, Where’s Waldo?, and ThunderCats Roar. From 2017, for seasons 1–4, Pinnock was a supporting character on Young Sheldon.

In 2018, she created the Instagram series Hashtag Booked to comment on the barriers encountered by Black women in the entertainment industry. She and co-creator LaNisa Renée Frederick received a Webby Award for the series. After the onset of the COVID-19 pandemic in 2020, Pinnock gained wider prominence for her comedic videos posted to her Instagram and TikTok. She was named to Backstage's list of 25 On-the-Rise Performers You Need to Know in 2022.

Pinnock gained wider prominence as a main cast member on the 2021 CBS comedy Ghosts, on which she plays Alberta, a 1920s era jazz singer. Although she has no formal vocal training, she started to take lessons after she was cast. Salon hailed her acting as one of 10 breakout performances of 2021. She won in 2024 Astra Award and a 2025 NAACP Image Award, as well a Black Reel Award nomination for her performance.

In 2026, she is set to appear as a performer in the Off-Broadway revival of Whoopi Goldberg's The Whoopi Monologues at Lincoln Center Theatre. Directed by Whitney White she will star alongside Kerry Washington, Kara Young, Dominique Fishback and Kecia Lewis.

== Personal life ==
Pinnock resides in Los Angeles. In 2013 she married British dialect coach Jack Wallace, whom she met while in her graduate program at Royal Birmingham Conservatoire.

== Filmography ==
=== Television ===
Year	Title	Role	Notes
2016	This Is Us	Ruth	1 episode
2017	Workaholics	Hair Dresser	1 episode
2017–2019	Get Shorty	Pamela	Recurring
2017–2020	Young Sheldon	Ms. Ingram	Recurring
2018	Scandal	Krystal	1 episode
2019	Teachers	Yolanda	1 episode
2019	Dollface	Nadine	1 episode
2019–2020	Where's Waldo?	Cake Vendor / Wizard Doubloon (voice)	2 episodes
2020	ThunderCats Roar	Barbastella (voice)	2 episodes
2020	The Boss Baby: Back in Business	Pearl (voice)	1 episode
2020–2022	Doug Unplugs	Kath (voice)	Recurring
2021	A Black Lady Sketch Show	Halle	1 episode
2021–present	Ghosts	Alberta	Main role
2025	Very Important People	Ta'Tania Jackson	1 episode

=== Film ===
Year	Title	Role	Note
2021	The Undertaker's Wife	Angela	
2022	Tell It Like a Woman	Debra	
2023	Candy Cane Lane	Kit	
2026	Same Same But Different	Simone	

== Awards and nominations ==
Year	Award	Category	Nominated work	Result	Ref.
2020	Webby Awards	Social, Arts & Entertainment	Hashtag Booked	Won	
2022	HCA TV Awards	Best Supporting Actress in a Broadcast Network or Cable Series, Comedy	Ghosts	Nominated	
2024	Astra Television Awards (Note: Formerly known as the HCA TV Awards.)	Best Supporting Actress in Broadcast Network or Cable Comedy Series	Ghosts	Won	
2024	Black Reel Awards	Outstanding Supporting Performance in a Comedy Series	Ghosts	Nominated	
2025	NAACP Image Awards	Outstanding Supporting Actress in a Comedy Series	Ghosts	Won	
