= Richie Moriarty =

American actor (born 1980)

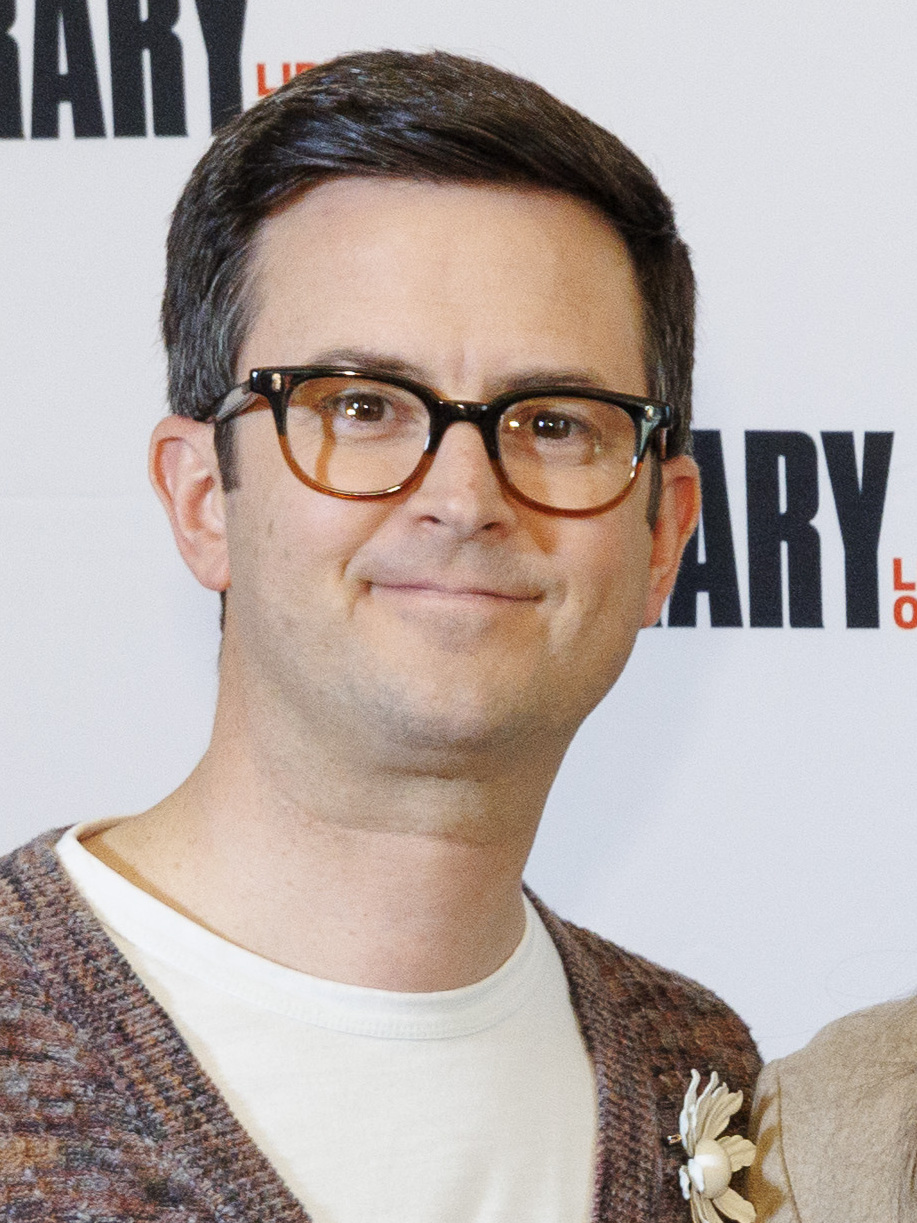
- Moriarty in 2024
- Born: April 25, 1980 (age 46); Jacksonville, Florida, United States
- Education: Boston College
- Occupations: Actor, comedian
- Years active: 2012–present
- Spouse: Ciara Moriarty
- Children: 2
- Website: richiemoriarty.com

Richie Moriarty (born April 25, 1980) is an American actor and comedian who has appeared in television shows including House of Cards, Orange Is the New Black, The Tick and Power. He appeared in the 2019 Super Bowl ad with John Malkovich and Peyton Manning. He stars as Pete Martino in the CBS comedy series Ghosts.

== Early life and education ==
When Moriarty was five, he moved to Rockville, Maryland, where he attended Wootton High School.

He is a graduate of Boston College, where he got into improv and took classes at ImprovBoston before performing as a Main Stage cast member at Improv Asylum.

== Career ==
Moriarty had a recurring role on the show The Tick. He has starred in Unbreakable Kimmy Schmidt.

He has appeared in films such as How to Be Single and Going in Style.

He has co-hosted a show on Comedy Central called Cinema Social Club.

He stars in the CBS series Ghosts, which is a remake of the BBC series of the same name. He portrays Pinecone Troop leader Peter Martino, who was accidentally shot through the neck with an arrow by one of his troop.

== Personal life ==
He is married to Ciara Moriarty, and they have two children. He has a sister named Colleen. He lives in Maplewood, New Jersey.

== Filmography ==
=== Film ===
Year	Title	Role	Notes
2014	Ready or Knot	Danat	
2016	How to Be Single	Co-worker Stan	
2016	Hamilton Impressions: 14 Celebrities in Under 2 Minutes	Impressionist	Short
2017	Poker Nights	Christian	
2017	Going in Style	Kyle Kitson	
2017	I Brought Pie	Evan	Short
2018	Facebook or Death?		Short
2018	US Open: Before the Roar (American Express Tennis)	Superfan	Video
2019	The Dishwasher	Todd	Short
2020	Irresistible	MSNBC Anchor	
2020	Going Under	Mike	Short
2021	Trapped		Short
2023	Dumb Money	Additional Voices	
2024	The Instigators	Jerry the Grocer	
2025	Nonnas	Dan McClane	
2026	Same Same But Different	Pat	Post-production

=== Television ===
Year	Title	Role	Notes
2012	Portrait STUdio	Stu	
2013–2015	Above Average Presents	2 Idiots / Dr. Franklin / Spokesman	
2014	Chasing Life	Waiter	
2014–2015	Congressional Hearings	Congressman DiSalvoSalvo	
2015	Unbreakable Kimmy Schmidt	News Producer	
2015	Power	Medical Examiner Tech	
2015	The Mysteries of Laura	Ted Burns	
2015	Dog People	Husband	
2015	Improvising	Richie	TV Movie
2016–2017	The Tick	Arthur's Dad / Mr. Everest	
2017–2019	Adam Ruins Everything	John Yudkin	
2017–2021	The Truth	Byron Reed / Caleb / Evan / Jack / Thomas / Junior Senator	
2018	Teasing John Malkovich	Young Director	TV Movie
2018	American Experience	Voice of Reporter from The Nation	
2018	House of Cards	Reporter	
2018–2022	Pinkalicious & Peterrific	Mr. Swizzle / Mr. Pitney / Sidewalk Sale Man	
2019	What We Do in the Shadows	Doug Peterson	
2019	The Last O.G.	Jon Carroll	
2019	Alternatino with Arturo Castro	Carl	
2019	Orange is the New Black	Mark Nelson	
2019	64th Man	Young Michael / Pro Player 2	
2020	Helpsters	Hula Hoop Hank	
2020	Search Party	Dumbass Host	
2021–present	Ghosts	Pete Martino	
2022	Self Center		Podcast Series
2022	Space: 1969	Ben Schwieker	Podcast Series
2022	Stephen Colbert Presents Tooning Out The News		
2022–2023	Hamster & Gretel	Angry Clown / Bouncy Castle	
