= Devan Chandler Long =

American actor (born 1983)

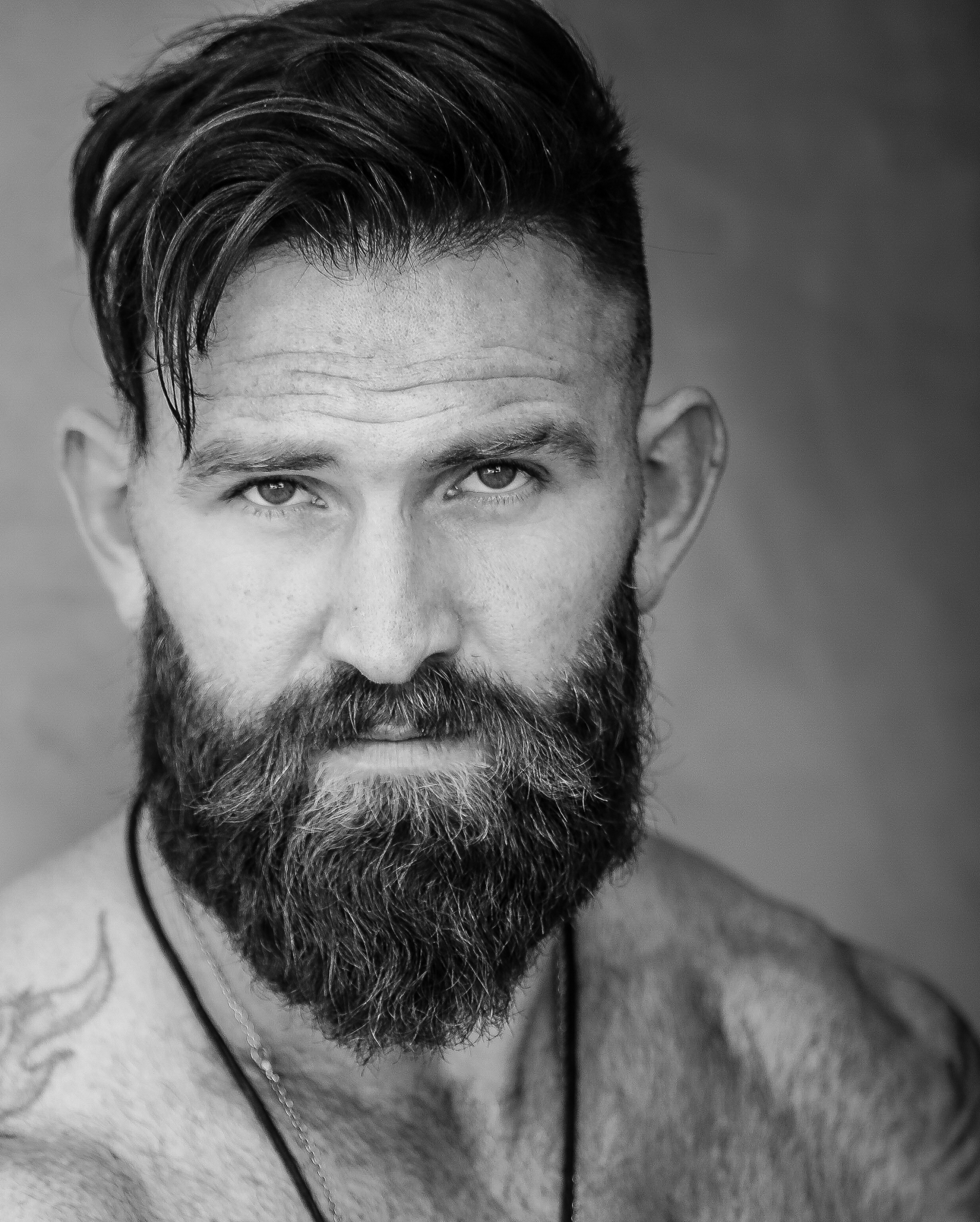
- Long in 2017
- Born: August 31, 1983 (age 43); Los Angeles, California, U.S.
- Education: University of Oregon
- Occupation: Actor
- Years active: 2011–present
- Known for: Ghosts
- Spouse: Jesse Golden (m. 2020)
- Children: 2
- Relatives: Rien Long (brother)

Devan Chandler Long (born August 31, 1983) is an American actor. He is known for playing Hart from the show Bosch and Flex Mentallo from the show Doom Patrol. He is also known for appearing in the 2022 movie Ambulance. Since 2021, he has portrayed the Viking ghost Thorfinn, in the CBS show Ghosts.

== Early life and education ==
He was born in Los Angeles, California, to David and Lori Cunningham. He grew up in the small town of Anacortes, Washington, and went to Anacortes High School.

When he was younger, Long dreamed of playing in the National Football League. In high school during his senior year, he got All-Northwest acclaim for playing wingback and inside linebacker. This was after he got honorable mention for defensive end honors in 1999.

He ended up going to University of Oregon to play collegiate football where he played defensive end. During his time there, he was two-time All-Conference honorable mention standout. Even though he had a litany of back and hamstring injuries by his senior year, he was fourth on the quarterback sack list (19.5) and seventh for all-time tackles for loss (32) at the school. While attending the university, he majored in political science. He attended the school and played football until his graduation in 2005. He got into training camp for the Carolina Panthers, but his injuries ended his NFL aspirations.

After his NFL dreams ended, an agent he met through his brother encouraged him to do a commercial which he was able to book. After moving to Venice, California, he met an agent through a friend, who helped him book more commercials. He took acting and improv classes to gain experience and build his confidence.

== Career ==
Long's acting career started with his role on NCIS: Los Angeles. He went on to perform in other TV shows such as Shameless, Sons of Anarchy, Scorpion, Agents of S.H.I.E.L.D, and Teen Wolf. He went on to play more prominent roles in shows Bosch as Hart, and Doom Patrol as Flex Mentallo.

He has also appeared in films including The Deal, Baker's Man and Dirt. He got a prominent role as Mel Gibson in Michael Bay's movie Ambulance.

== Personal life ==
Long has a brother named Rien Long who got a football scholarship to play for Washington State University and ended up playing for the Tennessee Titans. Devan lives in Venice, California, with wife Jesse Golden whom he married in 2020, and their son.

== Filmography ==
=== Film ===
Year	Title	Role	Notes
2016	The Deal	Tommy	
2017	Baker's Man	George	
2017	Ex-Mas Party	Zach	Short
2018	Dirt	Bulger	
2022	Ambulance	Mel Gibson	

=== Television ===
Year	Title	Role	Notes
2011	NCIS: Los Angeles	Henchman	Episode: "The Debt"
2012	Shameless	Nick Saakashvili	Episode: "Father's Day"
2013	Maron	Worker	Episode: "Dead Possum"
2013	Sam & Cat	John Zakappa	
2014	Rake	Soloman	Episode: "A Close Shave"
2014	#AwkwardMornings		Episode: "Boyfriend"
2014	The Bridge	Border Guard	Episode: "Yankee"
2014	Matador	Zupan	Episode: "Quid Go Pro"
2014	Bad Judge	Byron Cash	Episode: "Knife to a Gunflight"
2014	Sons of Anarchy	White Guard	Episode: "What a Piece of Work Is Man"
2014	Scorpion	Max	Episode: "Talismans"
2015	Agents of S.H.I.E.L.D.	Tat	Episode: "A Wanted (Inhu)Man"
2016	The Last Ship	Renfro	Episode: "Legacy"
2016	General Hospital	Gary	
2016	Ice	Atherton	Episode: "Hyenas"
2017	It's Always Sunny in Philadelphia	Gym Worker	Episode: "Wolf Cola: A Public Relations Nightmare"
2017	Training Day	Blake	Episode: "Apocalypse Now"
2017	Teen Wolf	Abel	Episode: "Face-to-Faceless"
2017	S.W.A.T	Fennick	Episode: "Pilot"
2017	Runaways	Kincaid	
2019	Now Apocalypse	Otto West	
2019	The Magicians	The Foremost	Episode: "All That Hard, Glossy Armor"
2019	Bosch	Hart	
2019	NCIS	Terry Kemper	Episode: "Someone Else's Shoes"
2019–2020	The Rookie	Ripper	Episodes: "Breaking Point" & "Control"
2019–2020	Doom Patrol	Flex Mentallo	4 episodes
2021–present	Ghosts	Thorfinn	Main Character
