= American Blue Note =

- Theatrical release poster
- Directed by: Ralph Toporoff
- Screenplay by: Gilbert Girion; Ralph Toporoff
- Story by: Gilbert Girion; Ralph Toporoff
- Starring: Peter MacNicol; Carl Capotorto; Tim Guinee; Bill Christopher-Myers; Jonathan Walker; Eddie Jones
- Cinematography: Joey Forsyte
- Edited by: Jack Haigis
- Music by: Larry Schanker
- Production companies: Fakebook; Manley Productions; Vested Interest
- Distributed by: Panorama Entertainment
- Release dates: 1989 (Boston Film Festival); March 29, 1991 (wide)
- Running time: 97 minutes
- Country: United States
- Language: English

American Blue Note is a 1989 American independent comedy-drama film directed by Ralph Toporoff, who wrote the screenplay with Gilbert Girion. It stars Peter MacNicol, Carl Capotorto, Tim Guinee, Jonathan Walker, Bill Christopher-Myers, and Eddie Jones. Filmed in 1989, the independently produced film didn't get a distributor until 1991.

== Premise ==
The film follows a group of jazz musicians in the 1960s who play in small clubs and face constant financial hardships. Of the group, only one of them will go on to achieve success.

== Principal cast ==
Actor	Role
Peter MacNicol	Jack Solow
Carl Capotorto	Jerry
Tim Guinee	Bobby
Bill Christopher-Myers	Lee
Jonathan Walker	Tommy
Margaret Devine	Sharon
Trini Alvarado	Lorraine
Eddie Jones	Sean Katz
Zohra Lampert	Louise
Sam Behrens	Nat Joy
Mel Johnson Jr.	Ron
