= The Walsh Brothers =

The Walsh Brothers were a comedic duo originally from Charlestown, Massachusetts who now are retired from comedy and live in Los Angeles. Both attended the University of Massachusetts at Amherst and worked at the Massachusetts State House before founding their Great and Secret Comedy Show at the ImprovBoston comedy club in Cambridge, Massachusetts, then in that city's Inman Square.

The Great and Secret Comedy Show ran from 2003 to March 2007, bringing to the stage alternative comics such as Dan Sally, Renata Tutko, Nate Johnson, Chris Coxen, Ken Reid and Sean Sullivan and influencing and serving as a comparison for independent alternative comedy shows around Boston for years to come.

They competed in the HBO-sponsored US Comedy Arts Festival in 2006 and the Edinburgh Fringe Festival in 2007. They have been performing at the Upright Citizens Brigade Theatre in Los Angeles since 2011, the same year they drew media attention and a mention on Jimmy Kimmel Live for a video showing them taking part in the planking prank fad.

In 2013 they began doing a Web series for Comedy Central Studios, which was renewed for a second season.

On March 4, 2015, The Walsh Brothers appeared on Ken Reid's TV Guidance Counselor Podcast.
