= Astra TV Award for Best Broadcast Network Comedy Series =

Award presented by the Hollywood Creative Alliance

Astra Award for Best Broadcast Network Comedy Series
- Awarded for: Outstanding comedy series on broadcast networks
- Country: United States
- Presented by: Hollywood Creative Alliance
- First award: 2021
- Currently held by: Ghosts (2024)

The Astra Award for Best Broadcast Network Comedy Series is an annual award presented by the Hollywood Creative Alliance to honor the best comedy television series on broadcast networks. It has been given since its inaugural edition.

== Winners and nominations ==
Winners are listed first in colored row and highlighted in boldface, followed by other nominees.

Year	Program	Network
2021 (1st)
2021 (1st)	**Young Rock**	**NBC**
2021 (1st)	Black-ish	ABC
2021 (1st)	Mr. Mayor	NBC
2021 (1st)	Superstore	NBC
2021 (1st)	Zoey's Extraordinary Playlist	NBC
2022 (2nd)
2022 (2nd)	**Abbott Elementary**	**ABC**
2022 (2nd)	American Auto	NBC
2022 (2nd)	Black-ish	ABC
2022 (2nd)	Brooklyn Nine-Nine	NBC
2022 (2nd)	Ghosts	CBS
2022 (2nd)	Mr. Mayor	NBC
2022 (2nd)	The Wonder Years	ABC
2022 (2nd)	Young Rock	NBC
2023 (3rd)
2023 (3rd)	**Abbott Elementary**	**ABC**
2023 (3rd)	Animal Control	Fox
2023 (3rd)	Ghosts	CBS
2023 (3rd)	The Goldbergs	ABC
2023 (3rd)	Night Court	NBC
2023 (3rd)	Not Dead Yet	ABC
2024 (4th)
2024 (4th)	**Ghosts**	**CBS**
2024 (4th)	Abbott Elementary	ABC
2024 (4th)	Animal Control	Fox
2024 (4th)	The Conners	ABC
2024 (4th)	The Neighborhood	CBS
2024 (4th)	Not Dead Yet	ABC
2024 (4th)	Son of a Critch	The CW
2024 (4th)	Young Sheldon	CBS
