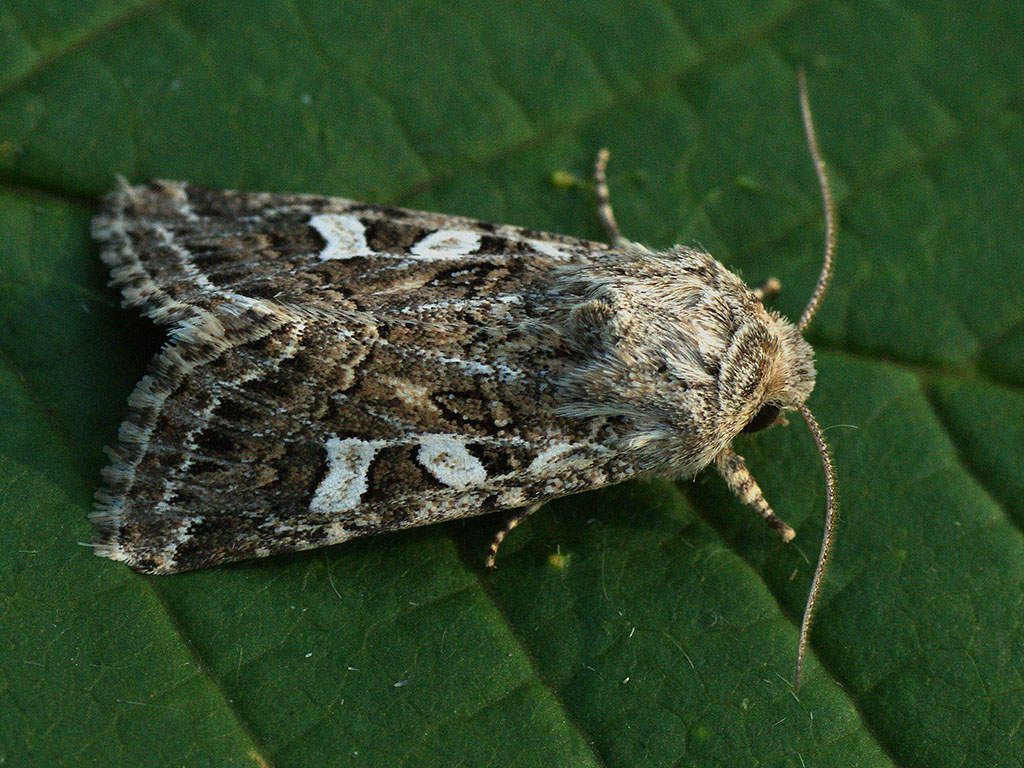

Scientific classification
- Kingdom: Animalia
- Phylum: Arthropoda
- Clade: Pancrustacea
- Class: Insecta
- Order: Lepidoptera
- Superfamily: Noctuoidea
- Family: Noctuidae
- Genus: Saragossa
- Species: S. siccanorum

Binomial name
- Saragossa siccanorum (Staudinger, 1870)

Synonyms
- Mamestra siccanorum Staudinger, 1870

= Saragossa siccanorum =

Species of moth

Saragossa siccanorum is a species of moth of the family Noctuidae. It is found in south-eastern Europe, Turkey, Lebanon, Israel, Iraq, Azerbaijan, Ukraine, southern Russia, central Asia, western Mongolia and north-western China.

Adults are on wing from October to January. There is one generation per year.

== Subspecies ==
- Saragossa siccanorum siccanorum
- Saragossa siccanorum poecilographa
