= Same Same but Different (2026 film) =

- Directed by: Lauren Noll
- Written by: Dalia Rooni
- Produced by: Dalia Rooni; Lauren Noll; Zein Khleif; Medalion Rahimi; Emily Reach White
- Starring: Medalion Rahimi; Logan Miller; Layla Mohammadi; Dalia Rooni; Richie Moriarty; Michael Baszler; Danielle Pinnock; Lauren Noll; Nicholas Coombe
- Cinematography: Nathaniel Krause
- Edited by: Stephanie Williams
- Music by: Neuman Jody Mannas
- Production companies: Studio 15; Saffron Honey Films
- Release date: March 12, 2026 (SXSW)
- Running time: 105 minutes
- Country: United States
- Language: English

Same Same But Different is a 2026 American romantic comedy drama film directed and produced by Lauren Noll, and written by Dalia Rooni.

The film premiered at the SXSW on March 12, 2026.

== Cast ==
- Medalion Rahimi as Rana
- Logan Miller as Adam
- Layla Mohammadi as Set
- Dalia Rooni as Nadia
- Richie Moriarty as Pat
- Michael Baszler as Ryan
- Danielle Pinnock as Simone
- Lauren Noll as Malena
- Nicholas Coombe as Nolan
- Kevin Nealon as Siddhartha
- Joey Lauren Adams as Rebecca

== Production ==
Principal photography began on April 1, 2025, in Cape Cod and Mattapoisett, Massachusetts on a romantic comedy drama film titled The Weekend On Cape Cod When Everything Changed, starring Medalion Rahimi, Logan Miller, Layla Mohammadi, Dalia Rooni, Richie Moriarty, Michael Baszler, Danielle Pinnock, Lauren Noll, Nicholas Coombe, Kevin Nealon, and Joey Lauren Adams. By February 2026, the film had been retitled to Same Same But Different.

== Release ==
Same Same But Different premiered at the SXSW on March 12, 2026.
