= Wide Sargasso Sea (disambiguation) =

Wide Sargasso Sea is a 1966 novel by Jean Rhys.

Wide Sargasso Sea may also refer to:

- Wide Sargasso Sea (1993 film), directed by John Duigan
- Wide Sargasso Sea (2006 film), directed by Brendan Maher
- Wide Sargasso Sea, a stage adaptation by Chamber Made Opera
- "Wide Sargasso Sea", a song on the Stevie Nicks album In Your Dreams

== See also ==
- Sargasso Sea (disambiguation)
