= Ghosts (American TV series) =

2021 American television sitcom)

- Genre: Sitcom
- Based on: Ghosts by: Mathew Baynton; Simon Farnaby; Martha Howe-Douglas; Jim Howick; Laurence Rickard; Ben Willbond
- Developed by: Joe Port; Joe Wiseman
- Showrunners: Joe Port; Joe Wiseman
- Starring: Rose McIver; Utkarsh Ambudkar; Brandon Scott Jones; Danielle Pinnock; Richie Moriarty; Asher Grodman; Sheila Carrasco; Devan Chandler Long; Rebecca Wisocky; Román Zaragoza; Ben Feldman
- Music by: Jeff Cardoni
- Country of origin: United States
- Original language: English
- No. of seasons: 6
- No. of episodes: 96 (list of episodes)

Production
- Executive producers: Joe Port; Joe Wiseman; Mathew Baynton; Jim Howick; Simon Farnaby; Laurence Rickard; Ben Willbond; Martha Howe-Douglas; Alison Carpenter; Debra Hayward; Alison Owen; Angie Stephenson
- Production location: Montreal, Quebec
- Camera setup: Single-camera
- Running time: 20–22 minutes
- Production companies: Joe vs. Joe; Monumental Television; Them There; Lionsgate Television; BBC Studios LA Productions; CBS Studios

Original release
- Network: CBS
- Release: October 7, 2021 – present

Related
- Ghosts (British TV series); Ghosts (Australian TV series)

Ghosts is an American television supernatural sitcom adapted for CBS from the original British series of the same name by Joe Port and Joe Wiseman, who serve as the series' showrunners. It premiered on October 7, 2021 and was picked up for a full season that month.

In February 2025, the series was renewed for seasons five and six. The sixth season premiered on October 29, 2026 with a one hour Halloween special.

== Premise ==
Married New Yorkers Samantha "Sam" and Jay Arondekar believe their dreams have come true when they inherit Woodstone Manor, a beautiful country house in Hudson Valley, Ulster County, from Sophie Brimble, Sam's great aunt. The two have a dream of turning the property into a bed and breakfast, only to find that the manor is falling apart. When Sam has a near-death experience caused by Trevor successfully moving a vase in his path to haunt the Arondekars, she realizes the property is also inhabited by ghosts, which she can now see and hear. The ghosts are of people from different eras of American history who died on the property and are now bound to the area, appearing as they did at the times of their deaths and each with a unique power based on their life or manner of death, until they can reach the afterlife.

== Cast and characters ==
=== Main ===
==== Living ====
- Rose McIver as Samantha "Sam" Arondekar, a freelance journalist who, after an accident that leaves her clinically dead for three minutes, revives with the ability to see, hear, and interact with ghosts. She is loosely based on Alison Cooper from the original British series.
- Utkarsh Ambudkar as Jayanth "Jay" Arondekar, Samantha's husband and a chef with many typically geek-like interests such as comic books, sci-fi films like Star Wars movies, video games, Dungeons & Dragons, and the movie Shawshank Redemption. He often attempts to communicate with the ghosts despite being unable to see or hear them, and founds his own restaurant in an abandoned barn on the Woodstone mansion property in the fourth season. He is loosely based on Mike Cooper from the original British series.
- Ben Feldman as Kyle Rosenblatt (season 6; recurring seasons 4–5), a man who can see ghosts after colliding with a bird while riding a roller coaster. Sam, Jay and sometimes the ghosts occasionally call on him for this reason.

==== Ghosts ====
- Devan Chandler Long as Thorfinn ("Thor"), an aggressive, often melodramatic Viking from Norway and the oldest of the main ghosts, who set out to explore North America over 1,000 years ago but was left behind by his shipmates who counted one shipmate twice. He died from a lightning strike conducted by the helmet he wore, and thus he has the ability to manipulate electricity. He enjoys watching TV as well as regaling his friends with stories of combat, especially against Danes, and his favorite foods, particularly cod. He has a son named Bjørn, now a ghost on an adjacent property, who married a Danish woman. His previous ghost girlfriends include Luella and "Flat Maria", both of whom have since moved on to the afterlife. His current girlfriend is “Flower” Susan Montero. He is loosely based on Robin the caveman in the original British series.
- Román Zaragoza as Sasappis ("Sass"), a wry Lenape hunter and storyteller, who often serves as the voice of reason for the other ghosts. Sass died in 1513 for reasons unknown. He can influence living people's thoughts by interacting with them as characters in their dreams, making him the only ghost who can directly speak to Jay. He enjoys storytelling, stirring up drama, watching TV, and smelling food, especially pizza, prepared by the living. Despite being the second oldest ghost, he is more aware of the modern world than most and speaks like a modern person because he "pays attention". He died a virgin and is easily embarrassed whenever other ghosts bring it up.
- Brandon Scott Jones as Captain Isaac Higgintoot (né Higginbottom), an initially closeted gay Continental Army officer who died of dysentery at age 35 in 1777 two weeks after the siege of Fort Ticonderoga, and has been largely forgotten by history, making him immensely jealous of the more famous Alexander Hamilton, with whom he became rivals over a neck ruffle they both coveted. He has the most embarrassing of ghost powers; the living can smell a foul odor if they pass through him. He is also implied to have been an ineffective leader as he often mentions how he "heroically" surrendered after most of the battles he led. He is inspired mainly by the Captain in the original British series, while his ghost power is similar to that of Mary Guppy the witch trial victim.
- Rebecca Wisocky as Henrietta "Hetty" Woodstone, the uptight lady of the manor, Sam's great-great-great-aunt, and the daughter of the original owner of the mansion. She takes pride in being wealthy, looks down her nose on the working class and anyone Irish (though she eventually learns she had an Irish grandmother), and experimented with now-illicit drugs throughout her life, including cocaine and morphine. Her husband Elias cheated on her in life with many different women, while her son Thomas was responsible for Alberta's murder. She strangled herself to death at age 45 in 1895 using a telephone cord to avoid being arrested for Elias's crimes, allowing Thomas to escape with his inheritance. Her ghost power is the ability to interact with the living on St. Patrick's Day after acknowledging and embracing her Irish heritage. She is based on Lady Fanny Button in the original British series.
- Danielle Pinnock as Alberta Haynes (born Esther Greene), a Prohibition-era diva lounge singer and rising star who gave up ventriloquism in 1923, fled to New York, and adopted a new identity in order to pursue music until she was murdered in 1928 by drinking strychnine-laced moonshine. A ghost power she possesses is that the Amazon Alexa device can hear her and obey her instructions.
- Sheila Carrasco as Susan "Flower" Montero, a cheerful and sweet but naive hippie of Hispanic origin who lived in both a commune and a cult in the 1960s. In 1969 at age 31, she was mauled to death by a bear she tried to hug while under the influence of drugs. She alternates between flighty, forgetful moments and brief periods of clarity. She can put a living person into a hallucinogenic high if she passes through them, can speak fluent Spanish, and likes being in polyamorous relationships. If she passes through a living person on drugs, it temporarily neutralizes the effects of hers. She shares a closeness and gentle flirtation with Thorfinn, and they start dating later in the second season. Due to Carrasco's maternity leave, Flower goes missing in the third season, but is found to have fallen into a well while chasing a butterfly.
- Richie Moriarty as Peter "Pete" Martino, a friendly and polite, but socially awkward, Italian American travel agent and leader of a uniformed youth group called the Pinecone Troopers. He died at age 40 in 1985 when one of the uniformed girls in his care ignored the safety rules and accidentally shot him through the neck with an arrow. He has an initially unrequited romantic interest in Alberta, and Jay considers him one of his best friends due to many shared interests between them. Among his varied interests are improvisational theater, basketball, Dungeons & Dragons, the Star Wars franchise of films, and general 1980s culture like Newhart and Ghostbusters. He is the only ghost in the main group who can leave the Woodstone property and go anywhere he wants, but if he stays away from the property for too long, he will start to vanish piece-by-piece into oblivion. He is based on Pat Butcher in the original British series.
- Asher Grodman as Trevor Lefkowitz, a wealthy, womanizing, hard-partying, Jewish stockbroker and Wharton School alumnus who worked at Lehman Brothers. He is the most recently deceased of the main ghosts, who died at age 33 in 2000 from a heart attack, caused by an accidental drug overdose, while not wearing pants. Though he claims he lost his pants because he died during a sexual encounter, he simply lent his pants to his friend Adam Pinkus as a good deed. He can physically interact with the corporeal world to a limited degree, usually moving objects with only one index finger, if he concentrates hard enough. He is loosely based on Julian Fawcett MP in the original British series, and his initial attraction to Sam is similar to the poet Thomas Thorne's infatuation with Sam's counterpart Alison.

=== Recurring ===
==== Ghosts ====
- Hudson Thames (season 1) and Alex Boniello (season 2–present) as the head of Crash, a smooth-talking 1950s-era greaser ghost who was decapitated. He is loosely based on Sir Humphrey Bone in the British version; however, unlike Humphrey, whose head is always present in each appearance, Crash's head goes missing in the pilot episode when Thorfinn accidentally knocks it off his neck. Only his body (played by Matt Keyes) appears until his head is recovered in "Ghost Father of the Bride."
- The cholera victim ghosts (also called basement ghosts): an indeterminate number of ghosts who died in a pest house that used to be on the property during a 19th-century cholera outbreak and whose bodies were buried together in a pit. Although they can go upstairs if they wish, their sickly appearances disturb the upstairs ghosts, so they spend all their time in the basement and primarily find entertainment in watching the water heater for extended periods; consequently, they are experts on repairing and maintaining it. They can all give non-contagious symptoms of cholera for 24 hours to any living person they walk through. They are based on the plague ghosts in the British version, and most share first names with their actors.
  - Betsy Sodaro as "Nancy"/Adeline Marie Dunham, a former English princess who fled to the United States, prone to insulting everybody.
  - Stuart Fink as Cholera Victim Stuart.
  - Arthur Holden as Cholera Victim Creepy Dirk.
  - Cody Crain as Cholera Victim Cody
  - Nigel Downer as Cholera Victim Nigel—not to be confused with Nigel Chessum (below).
  - Cat Lemieux as Cholera Victim Catherine
  - Tyler Alvarez as Cholera Victim Ralph.
  - John Ambrose as Cholera Victim "Trunk", an immensely strong champion in the cholera ghosts' fight club.
- The British Revolutionary ghosts: three ghosts who died in the Revolutionary War and occupy the shed on the property that used to be a barracks, as was agreed upon with Isaac after the war ended. They keep mostly to themselves and come up to the main house to redraw the borderlines every few years.
  - John Hartman as Lieutenant Colonel Nigel Chessum, the leader of the trio, whom Isaac accidentally shot. They have had secret romantic feelings for one another since they were alive, and they begin a relationship at the end of the first season.
  - Chad Andrews (season 1) and Steven Yaffee (season 3–present) as Baxter, Nigel's subordinate who plays a fife.
  - Christian Daoust as Jenkins, Nigel's subordinate who possesses a musket. He and Nigel had a physical relationship before Nigel and Isaac started dating, and they "liaison" once more when Isaac and Nigel go "on a respite".
- Matt Walsh as Elias Woodstone, Hetty's husband, who died from suffocation in a vault that no ghosts can enter or exit. He has the power to make people sexually aroused when he walks through them.
- Odessa A'zion as Stephanie, a senior high school student who was murdered on her prom night by a chainsaw killer in 1987. She sleeps in the attic for months at a time, and wakes up around the day of her prom night each year. She often tries to seduce Trevor, but he rebuffs her advances since she still appears age 17.
- Crystle Lightning as Shiki, a Lenape woman on whom Sasappis had a crush in life. As a ghost, she is bound to the land occupied by the publishing office of the Ulster County Review magazine.
- Lindsey Broad as Judy, Henry Farnsby's deceased mother, who now haunts their home.
- Christian Jadah as Bjorn, Thorfinn's son, who travelled to find his father and now haunts the Farnsbys' property.
- Nichole Sakura as Jessica (season 2), a permanently drunk ghost who died in a car crash while driving under the influence and is now bound to a small perimeter around her former car.
- Caroline Aaron as Carol (guest seasons 1–2 and 5, recurring seasons 3–4), Pete's widow, who cheated on him with his best friend Jerry when he was alive.
  - Tara Spencer-Nairn as Young Carol (season 1)
- Allegra Edwards as Donna (seasons 3–4), a ghost Pete sleeps with in St. Lucia, who is popularly believed to have murdered her husband Gerald in 1982 and fled to the island before dying.
- Mary Holland as Patience (seasons 4–5), a mentally unstable Puritan ghost banished from her colony for being too Puritanical. Her ghost power allows her to make walls bleed and write short messages with the blood.
- Taylor Ortega as Joan (seasons 4–5), a screenwriter from the Golden Age of Hollywood.
- Chris Eckert as George, a Puritan ghost in the Farnsby estate who is now open about his homosexuality due to failing to reach the afterlife.

==== Living ====
- Tristan D. Lalla as Mark, a construction worker involved in renovating Woodstone Manor for Sam and Jay. He learns of the ghosts' existences during the fifth season.
- Rodrigo Fernandez-Stoll as Todd Pearlman, an obsessive fan of Alberta's who operates a "museum" dedicated to her out of his mother's garage.
- Ravi Patel as Lewis, an editor for Ulster County Review who publishes Sam's articles.
- Punam Patel as Bela, Jay's sister who is lured on social media by Trevor. Sam tells her the truth about her talking to ghosts, and while Bela is at first skeptical, Sam is able to convince her with the help of the ghosts. She later finds work at Jay's restaurant.
- Mark Linn-Baker and Kathryn Greenwood as Henry and Margaret Farnsby, Sam and Jay's swinger neighbors and owners of a rival B&B, who promise to support their permit applications for their renovations. Their house is also haunted by a collection of ghosts from across history, including Henry's mother. They are based on Barclay Beg-Chetwynde and his wife Bunny in the British version.
- Punkie Johnson and Carolyn Taylor as June and Ally, Sam and Jay's neighbors who run an organic farm called "Cover Crop Farms".
- Mike Lane as Freddie (season 2, guest season 5), a deliveryman hired as an assistant at the Arondekars' B&B.
- Jessie Ennis as Kelsey Foster, a con artist who claims to be Sam's cousin and David Woodstone's daughter.
- Joy Osmanski as Sharon, a publisher who agrees to publish Isaac's autobiography, but only as a young adult vampire novel.
- Dustin Ybarra as Gabe (seasons 4–present), a cannabis-loving chef at Jay's restaurant.

=== Guests ===
- Tacey Adams as Sophie Brimble (née Woodstone), Sam's great aunt and Hetty's great-granddaughter, from whom Sam inherits Woodstone Manor.
- Rachael Harris as Sheryl, Sam's mother, who she sees as a ghost at the restaurant where she died. After she and Sam make peace with each other, she moves on to the afterlife.
- Jamie Mayers as Winky, a 12-year-old paper boy who was trampled to death by a horse and now haunts the Ulster County Review office with Shiki.
- Gregory Zaragoza as Naxasi, Sass's father, who tried to convince him not to be a storyteller.
- Rob Huebel as Ari, one of Trevor's former coworkers from Lehman Brothers who comes to the mansion to purchase a timepiece found on Elias's remains.
  - Blair Penner as young Ari
- Mercedes Morris as Clara Brown, a lounge singer and bootlegger whose illegal activities Alberta reported so she could steal a gig from her.
- Drew Tarver as Micah, a charismatic cult leader who attempts to manipulate Jay into joining his group so they can move into the mansion.
- Hannah Rose May as Molly, an Irish maid with whom Elias had sex when they were alive.
- Dallas Goldtooth as Bob, a Lenape man from the Hudson Valley Lenape Culture Center.
- Kelly Craig as Olga, Thorfinn's wife and Bjorn's mother.
- Mathew Baynton as an actor starring in a reconstruction of Pete's death.
- Rose Abdoo as Paula, the producer of "Dumb Deaths".
- Dana Gourrier as Jennifer, a woman who was one of Pete's scout troops that witnessed his death.
- Kaliko Kauahi as a liquor license inspector.
- Neil Crone as Benjamin Franklin, an American Founding Father and Freemason, with whom Isaac tried to build a good reputation so he could join the society.
- Andrew Leeds as Eric, Bela's friend, whom she starts dating in the second season.
- Hillary Anne Matthews as Beatrice, Isaac's wife, who knew about his sexuality but cared deeply for him regardless.
- Chip Zien as Lenny Lefkowitz, Trevor's father who attends Trevor's memorial at Woodstone Manor.
- Laraine Newman as Esther Lefkowitz, Trevor's mother who attends Trevor's memorial at Woodstone Manor.
- Tara Reid as herself attending Trevor's memorial at Woodstone Manor.
- Ashley D. Kelley as Alicia, a lawyer and a descendant of Alberta, who is inspired by her ancestor's work to pursue singing.
- David Baby as Jerry, Carol's current husband and Pete's former best friend.
- Asia Martin as Theresa, Alberta's sister.
- Brooks Brantly as Earl, Alberta's bootlegger boyfriend.
- Daniel Rindress-Kay as Thomas Woodstone, Hetty's son and Earl's secret boyfriend.
- Jeremy Luke as Al Capone, a famous Chicago crime boss.
- Brian Cook as David Woodstone, Sam's uncle, Sophie's son, and Trevor's former coworker, who huaunts a strip club.
- Al Connors as Schmitty, another ghost at the strip club who died from eating ill-prepared sushi.
- Holly Gauthier-Frankel as Laura, Pete's daughter. She has a son named after her father.
  - Emily Mitchell as Young Laura.
- Douglas Sills as Samuel, Hetty's father, who discouraged her from marrying an artist due to his painting her with her ankle exposed.
- Jon Glaser as Jeremy Lefkowitz, Trevor's brother, who refused to take over their father's business.
  - David Kohlsmith as Young Jeremy.
- Lamorne Morris as Saul Henry, a poltergeist and former Negro league baseball player who visits the manor using a guest as his host and starts a brief relationship with Alberta.
- Geoffrey Owens as Gene, a new guest at Woodstone to whom Saul is tethered.
- Deniz Akdeniz as Chris, an Australian male stripper and part-time DJ who becomes a ghost after a parachute accident.
- Irene White and Adrian Martinez as Gloria and Mike, a ghost couple Pete meets in a DealMart superstore. They were trampled to death in a 2005 Black Friday sale, and Gloria is now stuck carrying a box containing the TV she tried to buy.
- Marc-André Boulanger as the Butcher Ghost, the leader of a violent ghost gang that becomes active in the Hudson Valley DealMart after business hours, who was fatally struck in the head with a meat cleaver.
- Dean Norris as Frank, Sam's father.
- Melinda McGraw as Diane, Frank's new girlfriend.
- Matty Cardarople as Jamie, an Internet personality with a video series themed around detonating objects.
- Gardiner Millar as Duffy, a Vietnam veteran ghost who haunts his former house, now owned by Jamie.
- Connor Ratliff as Scott Morgan, the director of the Hudson Valley Players.
- Samantha Boscarino as Marisa, an actress in the Hudson Valley Players in whom Sass becomes romantically interested.
- Hayden Finkelshtain as William, an assessor of historical artifacts.
- Sakina Jaffrey as Champa Arondekar, Jay's mother, who immigrated from India to America with her husband Mahesh.
- Bernard White as Mahesh Arondekar, Jay's father and Champa's husband.
- Paul Wight as Gorm, a Viking ghost haunting a historic Norwegian village.
- Lenny Venito as Anthony, the head of a local mafia branch and Carol's nephew, whose family used Pete's travel agency as a front for laundering money.
- Nat Faxon as Alexander Hamilton, an American Founding Father with whom Isaac became rivals over a neck ruffle they both sought to buy.
- Asif Ali as Sunil, Jay's cousin.
- Peter New as Janis, a Latvian ghost hunting expert.
- Richie Keen as Adam Pinkus, Trevor's former coworker. Keen also directed multiple episodes of the series.
  - Robert Bazzocchi as young Pinkus
- Gideon Adlon as Abby Pinkus, Trevor's biological daughter, born to his once-girlfriend Laurie Goldstein.
- Kyle Gatehouse as Richard, Donna's former neighbor, who died with a Walkman that only plays the album Purple Rain.
- Justin Kirk as Tad, the mayor of Hudson Valley and Stephanie's prom date from the night of her murder.
- Stephanie Belding as Melanie del Vecchio, Tad's wife and Stephanie's former friend.
- Farhang Ghajar as Amunhotep, an immensely powerful 3,000-year-old Egyptian ghost.
- Larry Wilmore as Walker Storm, a national news reporter who interviews Sam about Isaac's novel.
- Myles Anthony-Douglas as David, Mark's son.
- Will Greenberg as Bruce/Jason, the leader of Flower's former cult.
- Steve Berg as Eugene Woodstone, a cult member who brought some cult members to the bunker
- Tori Barban as Brenda, a cult member who died in the bunker
- Jon Blair as Ted, a cult member who died in the bunker
- Christopher Jackson as Anthony, an HR representative at the company where Trevor works.
- Eddie Shin as Dr. Park, a therapist for whom Sam translates Thorfinn's psychological problems.
- Maria Thayer as Margaret, Hetty's sister who is discovered to be spending the afterlife trapped in a mirror.

== Episodes ==
Season	Episodes	Originally released	
Season	Episodes	First released	Last released
1	18	October 7, 2021	April 21, 2022
2	22	September 29, 2022	May 11, 2023
3	10	February 15, 2024	May 2, 2024
4	22	October 17, 2024	May 8, 2025
5	22	October 16, 2025	May 21, 2026
6	TBA	October 29, 2026	TBA

== Production ==
=== Development ===
On November 29, 2019, CBS announced that they were developing an adaptation of the BBC One series Ghosts. The original British series upon which the series is based was created by Mathew Baynton, Simon Farnaby, Martha Howe-Douglas, Jim Howick, Laurence Rickard, and Ben Willbond for BBC. On February 4, 2020, it was announced that the pilot had been picked up by CBS Studios and was co-produced with BBC Studios and Lionsgate Television. On March 31, 2021, it was announced that the adaptation has been picked up for a full series. In July 2021, it was announced that the series would premiere as a Thursday-night entry on October 7, 2021. On September 23, 2021, CBS changed the premiere to back-to-back episodes. On October 21, 2021, CBS picked up the series for a full season. On December 17, 2021, it was reported that production has been temporarily halted due to a positive case of COVID-19 on the set of the series. On January 24, 2022, CBS renewed the series for a second season which premiered on September 29, 2022. On November 8, 2022, it was announced that the BBC would be airing Ghosts in the United Kingdom under the name of 'Ghosts US' on BBC Three & BBC iPlayer on November 20, 2022. On January 12, 2023, CBS renewed the series for a third season, which premiered on February 15, 2024. On March 12, 2024, the series was renewed for a fourth season which premiered on October 17, 2024. On February 20, 2025, CBS renewed the series for a fifth and sixth season. The fifth season premiered on October 16, 2025. The sixth season premiered on October 29, 2026, with a two-episode Halloween special.

=== Casting ===
On March 4, 2020, Rose McIver was cast in a leading role for the pilot. On July 1, 2020, Utkarsh Ambudkar was cast in a main role for the pilot. On December 9, 2020, Brandon Scott Jones, Richie Moriarty, Asher Grodman, Rebecca Wisocky, Sheila Carrasco, Danielle Pinnock and Román Zaragoza were cast in main roles for the pilot. On May 12, 2021, Devan Chandler Long joined the cast as a series regular.

=== Filming ===
Filming for the third season began in Montreal on December 2, 2023.

== Reception ==
=== Critical response ===
For the first season, the review aggregator website Rotten Tomatoes reported a 93% approval rating with an average rating of 7.3/10, based on 27 critic reviews. The website's critics consensus reads, "Ghosts could stand to ask more of its characters, but an excellent ensemble and a genial wit make for easy, softly spooky viewing." Metacritic, which uses a weighted average, assigned a score of 69 out of 100 based on 13 critics, indicating "generally favorable reviews".

On Rotten Tomatoes, the second season received an approval rating of 100% with an average rating of 8.5/10, based on nine critic reviews.

On Rotten Tomatoes, the third season received an approval rating of 100% with an average rating of 8.1/10, based on seven critic reviews. Metacritic assigned a score of 81 out of 100 based on five critics, indicating "universal acclaim".

=== Ratings ===
Viewership and ratings per season of Ghosts
Season	Timeslot (ET)	Episodes	First aired		Last aired		TV season	Viewership rank	Avg. viewers (millions)	18–49 rank	Avg. 18–49 rating
Season	Timeslot (ET)	Episodes	Date	Viewers (millions)	Date	Viewers (millions)	TV season	Viewership rank	Avg. viewers (millions)	18–49 rank	Avg. 18–49 rating
1	Thursday 9:00 p.m.	18	October 7, 2021	5.52	April 21, 2022	6.25	2021–22	13	8.41	16	1.00
2	Thursday 8:30 p.m.	22	September 29, 2022	6.46	May 11, 2023	6.51	2022–23	8	9.07	8	0.94
3	Thursday 8:30 p.m.	10	February 15, 2024	7.05	May 2, 2024	5.95	2023–24	10	8.21	16	0.74
4	Thursday 8:30 p.m. (1–7, 9–22); Thursday 8:00 p.m. (8)	22	October 17, 2024	5.57	May 8, 2025	4.80	2024–25	TBD	TBD	TBD	TBD
5	Thursday 8:30 p.m.	22	October 16, 2025	4.14	May 21, 2026	TBD	2025–26	TBD	TBD	TBD	TBD

=== Accolades ===
Accolades received by Ghosts
Award	Year	Category	Recipient(s)	Result	Ref.
Artios Awards	2023	Outstanding Achievement in Casting – Television Pilot and First Season Comedy Series	Elizabeth Barnes, Tannis Vallely, Andrea Kenyon, and Randi Wells	Nominated	
Astra TV Awards	2022	Best Broadcast Network Series, Comedy	Ghosts	Nominated	
Astra TV Awards	2022	Best Actor in a Broadcast Network or Cable Series, Comedy	Utkarsh Ambudkar	Nominated	
Astra TV Awards	2022	Best Actress in a Broadcast Network or Cable Series, Comedy	Rose McIver	Nominated	
Astra TV Awards	2022	Best Supporting Actor in a Broadcast Network or Cable Series, Comedy	Brandon Scott Jones	Nominated	
Astra TV Awards	2022	Best Supporting Actress in a Broadcast Network or Cable Series, Comedy	Danielle Pinnock	Nominated	
Astra TV Awards	2023	Best Broadcast Network Series, Comedy	Ghosts	Nominated	
Astra TV Awards	2023	Best Actor in a Broadcast Network or Cable Series, Comedy	Utkarsh Ambudkar	Won	
Astra TV Awards	2023	Best Actress in a Broadcast Network or Cable Series, Comedy	Rose McIver	Nominated	
Astra TV Awards	2023	Best Supporting Actor in a Broadcast Network or Cable Series, Comedy	Brandon Scott Jones	Nominated	
Astra TV Awards	2023	Best Supporting Actress in a Broadcast Network or Cable Series, Comedy	Danielle Pinnock	Won	
Astra TV Awards	2023	Best Supporting Actress in a Broadcast Network or Cable Series, Comedy	Rebecca Wisocky	Nominated	
Astra TV Awards	2023	Best Directing in a Broadcast Network or Cable Series, Comedy	Christine Gernon (for "Whodunnit")	Nominated	
Astra TV Awards	2023	Best Writing in a Broadcast Network or Cable Series, Comedy	Joe Port and Joe Wiseman (for "Whodunnit")	Nominated	
Astra TV Awards	2024	Best Broadcast Network Comedy Series	Ghosts	Won	
Astra TV Awards	2024	Best Actor in a Broadcast Network or Cable Comedy Series	Utkarsh Ambudkar	Nominated	
Astra TV Awards	2024	Best Actress in a Broadcast Network or Cable Comedy Series	Rose McIver	Nominated	
Astra TV Awards	2024	Best Supporting Actor in a Broadcast Network or Cable Comedy Series	Asher Grodman	Nominated	
Astra TV Awards	2024	Best Supporting Actor in a Broadcast Network or Cable Comedy Series	Brandon Scott Jones	Nominated	
Astra TV Awards	2024	Best Supporting Actor in a Broadcast Network or Cable Comedy Series	Richie Moriarty	Nominated	
Astra TV Awards	2024	Best Supporting Actress in a Broadcast Network or Cable Comedy Series	Danielle Pinnock	Won	
Astra TV Awards	2024	Best Supporting Actress in a Broadcast Network or Cable Comedy Series	Rebecca Wisocky	Nominated	
Astra TV Awards	2024	Best Directing in a Broadcast Network or Cable Comedy Series	Pete Chatmon (for "Halloween 3: The Guest Who Wouldn't Leave")	Nominated	
Astra TV Awards	2024	Best Writing in a Broadcast Network or Cable Comedy Series	Sophia Lear (for "Holes are Bad")	Won	
Astra TV Awards	2024	Best Guest Actor in a Comedy Series	Lamorne Morris	Nominated	
Astra TV Awards	2025	Best Comedy Series	Ghosts	Nominated	
Astra TV Awards	2025	Best Actor in a Comedy Series	Utkarsh Ambudkar	Nominated	
Astra TV Awards	2025	Best Actress in a Comedy Series	Rose McIver	Nominated	
Astra TV Awards	2025	Best Supporting Actor in a Comedy Series	Asher Grodman	Nominated	
Astra TV Awards	2025	Best Supporting Actor in a Comedy Series	Román Zaragoza	Nominated	
Astra TV Awards	2025	Best Supporting Actress in a Comedy Series	Sheila Carrasco	Nominated	
Astra TV Awards	2025	Best Guest Actress in a Comedy Series	Mary Holland	Nominated	
Astra TV Awards	2025	Best Cast Ensemble in a Broadcast Network Comedy Series	Ghosts	Won	
Astra TV Awards	2025	Best Directing in a Comedy Series	Rose McIver (for "Ghostfellas")	Nominated	
Astra TV Awards	2025	Best Writing in a Comedy Series	Skander Halim and Talia Bernstein (for "Pinkus Returns")	Nominated	
Astra TV Awards	2026	Best Broadcast Network Comedy Ensemble	Ghosts	Pending	
Astra TV Awards	2026	Best Directing in a Comedy Series	Ghosts	Pending	
Critics' Choice Television Awards	2022	Best Supporting Actor in a Comedy Series	Brandon Scott Jones	Nominated	
Critics' Choice Television Awards	2023	Best Comedy Series	Ghosts	Nominated	
Critics' Choice Television Awards	2023	Best Supporting Actor in a Comedy Series	Brandon Scott Jones	Nominated	
Critics' Choice Television Awards	2025	Best Supporting Actor in a Comedy Series	Brandon Scott Jones	Nominated	
Critics' Choice Television Awards	2025	Best Supporting Actor in a Comedy Series	Asher Grodman	Nominated	
Critics' Choice Television Awards	2026	Best Supporting Actor in a Comedy Series	Asher Grodman	Nominated	
Critics' Choice Television Awards	2026	Best Comedy Series	Ghosts	Nominated	
Critics' Choice Television Awards	2026	Best Actress in a Comedy Series	Rose McIver	Nominated	
Critics' Choice Television Awards	2026	Best Supporting Actress in a Comedy Series	Rebecca Wisocky	Nominated	
Imagen Awards	2022	Best Supporting Actress – Comedy (Television)	Sheila Carrasco	Nominated	
Nickelodeon Kids' Choice Awards	2026	Favorite Family TV Show	Ghosts	Pending	
Saturn Awards	2022	Best Fantasy Television Series: Network / Cable	Ghosts	Nominated	
Saturn Awards	2022	Best Actress in a Network / Cable Series	Rose McIver	Nominated	
Saturn Awards	2022	Best Supporting Actor in a Network / Cable Series	Brandon Scott Jones	Nominated	
Saturn Awards	2022	Best Guest-Starring Performance: Network / Cable Series	Rachael Harris	Nominated	
Television Critics Association Awards	2022	Outstanding Achievement in Comedy	Ghosts	Nominated	
Television Critics Association Awards	2022	Outstanding New Program	Ghosts	Nominated	

== Home media ==
Lionsgate Home Entertainment released the complete first season on Blu-ray and DVD on November 29, 2022.

Season	No. of episodes	DVD Release dates		
Season	No. of episodes	Region 1	Region 2	Region 4
1	18	November 29, 2022	TBA	TBA
