= A Wanted (Inhu)man =

- Agents of S.H.I.E.L.D. episode
- Episode no.: Season 3 Episode 3
- Directed by: Garry A. Brown
- Written by: Monica Owusu-Breen
- Cinematography by: Feliks Parnell
- Editing by: Eric Litman
- Original air date: October 13, 2015
- Running time: 41 minutes

Guest appearances
- Constance Zimmer as Rosalind Price; Andrew Howard as Luther Banks; Daniel Feuerriegel as Spud; Daniel Roebuck as John Donnelly

Episode chronology
← Previous "Purpose in the Machine"	Next → "Devils You Know"
- Agents of S.H.I.E.L.D. season 3

"A Wanted (Inhu)man" is the third episode of the third season of the American television series Agents of S.H.I.E.L.D. Based on the Marvel Comics organization S.H.I.E.L.D., it follows Phil Coulson and his team of S.H.I.E.L.D. agents as they must ally with a rival organization to hunt Inhumans. It is set in the Marvel Cinematic Universe (MCU) and acknowledges the franchise's films. The episode was written by Monica Owusu-Breen, and directed by Garry A. Brown.

Clark Gregg reprises his role as Coulson from the film series, and is joined by series regulars Ming-Na Wen, Chloe Bennet, Iain De Caestecker, Elizabeth Henstridge, Nick Blood, Adrianne Palicki, Henry Simmons, and Luke Mitchell.

"A Wanted (Inhu)man" originally aired on ABC on October 13, 2015, and according to Nielsen Media Research, was watched by 3.74 million viewers.

== Plot ==
The Advanced Threat Containment Unit (ATCU) release information about Lincoln Campbell to the public, enlisting other intelligence agencies to help capture him. Phil Coulson admits to Daisy Johnson that Alphonso "Mack" Mackenzie planted a tracker on Lincoln the last time they met, and she calls him to try to convince him to let S.H.I.E.L.D. help him, but he hangs up and destroys the tracker. Coulson parlays with Rosalind Price and tries to convince her that panicking the public is not a good idea, and to let S.H.I.E.L.D. take Lincoln in rather than the ATCU. She threatens to release footage of Daisy from the hospital CCTV, so Coulson agrees to let the ATCU take Lincoln if they let Daisy go. Meanwhile, Lincoln seeks refuge with his Alcoholics Anonymous sponsor, John Donnelly, but after seeing a news report about Lincoln, a terrified John calls the ATCU and threatens Lincoln with a metal baseball bat. When Lincoln disarms John with his powers, he accidentally triggers a heart attack that kills John.

Evading the ATCU, Lincoln calls Daisy, who meets with him while Mack monitors the situation from nearby. Lincoln hates himself for killing his only friend, and believes he is a monster, but Daisy reassures him that he is a man whose purpose is to help others, reminding him that when they first met she believed herself to be a monster, but he gave her hope. She insists he let her do the same for him, and they share a kiss, but Mack interrupts and reveals Coulson has agreed to let the ATCU take Lincoln. He overpowers the soldiers and escapes, at which point chief agent Luther Banks attempts to take Daisy instead, but Price orders him to stand down after Coulson convinces her to agree to an alliance. Daisy is outraged that Coulson is willing to collaborate with the ATCU, but he explains he is sick of fighting those on the same side as him, such as Glenn Talbot and Robert Gonzales, when they should be helping the Inhumans and fighting Hydra.

Lance Hunter meets with an old contact of his, Spud, a mercenary associated with Hydra who offers to help him get a chance to join them. He reveals that Hydra's new policy is to have would-be members fight each other to prove themselves and be accepted into the organization. Hunter is later allowed to participate in such a fight, with Spud as his opponent. While May subdues three thugs who harass her, Hunter wins the fight and kills Spud, after which he is brought to meet Kebo, and offers him a large number of weapons for Hydra's use.

With Jemma Simmons struggling to adjust to being back on Earth, Leo Fitz takes her on the date he planned months earlier, having booked the entire restaurant so she can have peace and quiet, a gesture which deeply moves her. She later confides in Bobbi Morse that she has to return to the barren planet.

== Production ==
=== Development ===
In September 2015, Marvel announced that the third episode of the season would be titled "A Wanted (Inhu)man", to be written by Monica Owusu-Breen, with Garry A. Brown directing.

=== Casting ===
In September 2015, Marvel revealed that main cast members Clark Gregg, Ming-Na Wen, Brett Dalton, Chloe Bennet, Iain De Caestecker, Elizabeth Henstridge, Nick Blood, Adrianne Palicki, Henry Simmons, and Luke Mitchell would star as Phil Coulson, Melinda May, Grant Ward, Daisy Johnson, Leo Fitz, Jemma Simmons, Lance Hunter, Bobbi Morse, Alphonso "Mack" Mackenzie, and Lincoln Campbell, respectively. It was also revealed that the guest cast for the episode would include Constance Zimmer as Rosalind Price, Daz Crawford as Kebo, Andrew Howard as Luther Banks, Daniel Feuerriegel as Spud, Brett Edwards as army private, Daniel Roebuck as John Donnelly, Micah Fitzgerald as referee, Devan Chandler Long as Tat, David L. King as maître d' and Shannon Hollander as assistant. Crawford, Edwards, Fitzgerald, Long, King, and Hollander did not receive guest star credit in the episode. Zimmer, Crawford, and Howard reprise their roles from earlier in the series. Dalton does not ultimately appear.

== Broadcast ==
"A Wanted (Inhu)man" was first aired in the United States on ABC on October 13, 2015.

== Reception ==
=== Ratings ===
In the United States the episode received a 1.4/4 percent share among adults between the ages of 18 and 49, meaning that it was seen by 1.4 percent of all households, and 4 percent of all of those watching television at the time of the broadcast. It was watched by 3.74 million viewers.
