= Carl Capotorto =

American actor

Carl Caportorto
- Born: January 16, 1959 (age 67); Pelham Parkway, New York, U.S.
- Education: State University of New York, Purchase (BFA); Columbia University (MFA)
- Occupations: Actor, writer

Carl Capotorto (born January 16, 1959) is an American actor, known for his portrayal of Little Paulie Germani on The Sopranos. He is also the author of Twisted Head: An Italian-American Memoir.

== Filmography ==
=== Acting ===
Year	Title	Role	Notes
1987	Five Corners	Sal	
1989	American Blue Note	Jerry	
1990	Men of Respect	Don D'Amico	
1992	Mac	Bruno Vitelli	
2001	Riding in Cars with Boys	Cop #1	
2004	Highcrime	Sergeant Wallace	
2005	Law & Order: Criminal Intent	Jasper Ridley	Episode: "In the Wee Small Hours: Part 2"
2001–2007	The Sopranos	Paulie "Little Paulie" Germani	24 episodes
2019	The Deuce		Episode: "This Trust Thing"

=== Other work ===
Year	Title	Role	Note(s)
1988	The Suicide Club	Writer	
1991	The Days and Nights of Molly Dodd	Writer	Episode: "Here's How to Put an Egg In Your Shoe and Beat It"
1999	The Trey Billings Show	Writer, co-executive producer	Short
2016	Vinyl	Story editor, writer	10 episodes
2018–2019	The Deuce	Executive story editor, writer, story editor, producer	11 episodes
2020	Tommy	Writer	2 episodes
