= Medalion Rahimi =

American actress of Iranian descent (born 1992)

- Born: July 15, 1992 (age 33); Los Angeles, California, U.S.
- Occupation: Actress
- Years active: 2011–present

Medalion Rahimi (born July 15, 1992) is an American actress of Iranian and Jewish descent. She is known for playing Princess Isabella on the 2017 ABC Shonda Rhimes show Still Star-Crossed, Elody in the 2017 feature film Before I Fall, and Fatima on NCIS: Los Angeles, from 2019 to 2023.

== Early life ==
Rahimi was born in Los Angeles to Iranian parents, her father a Muslim dentist, and her mother, a Jewish lawyer, learning that "Faith is universal. And it shouldn’t separate us, it should bring us closer together. We want peace in the Middle East!" She aspired to act since she was ten years-old.

== Career ==
In 2014 and 2018 she had guest appearances on the CBS crime dramas NCIS and its spinoff NCIS: New Orleans. In 2019, she played the recurring role of Special Agent Fatima Namazi in the franchise's other spinoff, NCIS: Los Angeles. In February 2020, it was announced that she would be a regular on the show, beginning with season 11.

== Filmography ==
=== Film ===
Year	Title	Role	Notes
2011	Fat City, New Orleans	Miss Barnett	
2011	This Never Happened	Lola	
2013	Misogynist	Sister 1	
2013	Go for Broke	Stacey	
2013	528	528	Short
2015	Extraction	Alexis Diaz	
2016	XOXO	Nikki	
2016	Criticized	Waitress	
2017	Before I Fall	Elody	
2020	She's In Portland	Constance	
2022	Wild Braid	Golnaz	Short
2023	Moving Day	Jiera	Short
2024	Skincare	Margaret	
2026	Same Same But Different	Rana	Post-production; Also producer

=== Television ===
Year	Title	Role	Notes
2013	Criminal Minds	Secretary	Episode: "Final Shot"
2014	NCIS	Lila	Episode: "The Admiral's Daughter"
2014	Mystery Girls	Jazmine Jamil	Episode: "Pilot"
2014	New Girl	Stacey	Episode: "The Last Wedding"
2014	Jane the Virgin	Hot Girl	Episode: "Chapter 7"
2016	The Catch	Princess Zara Al-Salim	Recurring Cast: Season 1
2016	Awkward	Kelly	Episode: "Happy Campers. Happier Trails"
2016	#ThisIsCollege	Saba	Recurring Cast
2017	Still Star-Crossed	Princess Isabella	Main Cast
2017	Scandal	Yasmeen	Episode: "Adventures in Babysitting"
2018	My Dead Ex	Wren	Main Cast
2018	The Outpost	Naya	Recurring Cast: Season 1
2018	NCIS: New Orleans	Jazmine Hendricks	Episode: "Sheepdogs"
2019–23	NCIS: Los Angeles	Fatima Namazi	Recurring Cast: Seasons 10–11, Main Cast: Season 12–14
2022	Pam & Tommy	Danielle	Recurring Cast
2022	From Scratch	Laila Mahdi	Recurring Cast
2025	Hacks	Emily	3 episodes
2026–present	The Agency	Darya Rafhami	Recurring Cast; Season 2
