= Sheila Carrasco =

American actress

- Born: Chicago, Illinois, U.S.
- Education: New York University (BFA); Harvard University (MFA)
- Occupation: Actor
- Years active: 1993; 1998; 2010–present
- Children: 1

Sheila Carrasco is an American actress known for her role as Flower in the CBS show Ghosts. She has also appeared in The Good Place, Jane the Virgin, and American Housewife, and has made appearances in films like the Donor Party.

== Early life and education ==
Carrasco was born in the South Side of Chicago. Her father was a pastor.

Her interest in acting started from making home movies as a youth. She began acting at age 7 in a theater production of Annie.

She earned a Bachelor of Fine Arts in Directing and Set Design at NYU Tisch School of the Arts and received a Master of Fine Arts from Harvard University.

== Career ==
Carrasco's first acting credit was a guest star role in the television show The Untouchables in 1993.

She also performed at the American Repertory Theatre, Steppenwolf Garage, Court Theatre, Moscow Art Theatre, and the Groundlings. At Harvard's A.R.T Institute, she performed in The Discreet Charm of Monsieur Jourdain. At NYU's Tisch School of the Arts, she performed in A Streetcar Named Desire, Life and Limb, Youth in Asia, Life is a Dream, Medea, The Merchant of Venice. At Steppenwolf Garage, she performed in The Philadelphia Story, Court Theater, Blue Window.

She is also a member of the theater company IAMA, where she performed a one-person show called Anyone but Me, which she wrote, about the Latin American experience and identity.

Carrasco wrote the short film, Piano Lessons, and wrote and starred in the short film, The Quake, about two L.A. residents whose lives were "destroyed" by a 1.1 magnitude earthquake.

She has made recurring appearances on shows including, The Beauty Inside, Get Lost, How to Survive High School, Me and My Grandma, Jane the Virgin, and #VanLife. She also appeared in podcast series the Carrier and The Edge of Sleep.

She stars in the hit CBS show Ghosts as a main character, Flower.

== Personal life ==
Carrasco grew up as a member of the United Methodist Church. She announced in July 2023 that she and her partner, Josh, were expecting their first child.

== Filmography ==
=== Film ===
Year	Title	Role	Notes
2011	One Night Stand	Karen	Short
2012	Monster Roll	Customer	Short
2013	Blue Bird Street	Regina	Short
2013	Ralphie	Mouse Girl	Video
2016	Trophy Wives	Stacey	Short
2017	Fox News Sexual Harassment Training Video		Short
2017	In the Hole	Testimonial Woman	Short
2017	Killer Charm	Detective Jeanie	Short
2018	I F*cking Hate That Guy	Sheila	Short
2019	Finding the Asshole: Chapter 3	Anna	Short
2019	Open House	Jane	
2019	Morning Harmonizers: Carpool	Cece Peniston	Video
2020	Good Luck with Everything	Ally	
2021	5 Minutes	Sofia	Short
2022	A Lot of Nothing	Olivia	
2022	Superdead	Dr. Ellyn Salvadora	
2023	The Donor Party	Gia	
2023	Leo	Mrs. Wingo	

=== Television ===
Year	Title	Role	Notes
1993	The Untouchables	Sheila	First acting role
1998	Cupid	Young Claire	
2010	What Does Eco Mean?	Sheila	
2012	The Beauty Inside	Girl from the bar	TV Mini Series
2013	Boots	Juliana	TV Movie
2013	Dude, Where's My Chutzpah?	Jessie's sister	
2014	Get Lost	Sheila	
2015	How to Survive High School	Mom	
2015	Return to Sender	Dr. Carrasco	
2016	Marisol	Marisol Weaver	
2016	Life in Pieces	Beth	
2017	The Odd Couple	Lilias	
2017	Me and My Grandma	Agent	
2017	Jane the Virgin	Dana Peruzzi	
2017	American Housewife	Nurse Riley	
2018	My Future Self	Olivia	TV Movie
2018	Michael and Michael Are Gay	Sharon	TV Mini Series
2019	#VanLife	Jewel	
2019	I Think You Should Leave with Tim Robinson	Vanessa	
2019	Carrier	Agent Torres / Police Dispatch #2 / Radio Host	Podcast Series
2019	The Good Place	Matilda	
2019	The Edge of Sleep	Lila Monroe	Podcast Series
2019	Johnno and Michael Try	Diane	
2020	Outmatched	Rachael	
2021–present	Ghosts	Susan "Flower" Montero	
