= Sargasso Sea (disambiguation) =

The Sargasso Sea is a region of the North Atlantic Ocean.

Sargasso Sea or Sargasso may also refer to:

- Sargasso Sea (John Abercrombie and Ralph Towner album), 1976
- Sargasso Sea (Pram album), 1995
- Sargasso, a 1977 novel by Edwin Corley
- "Sargasso Sea", a song by Scale the Summit in Carving Desert Canyons
- "Sargasso Sea", a song by Salt Tank
- Sargasso (Devil May Cry), a low-class type of demon in the video game Devil May Cry

== See also ==
- Wide Sargasso Sea (disambiguation)
- Saragossa (disambiguation)
