= Román Zaragoza =

American actor (born 1996)

- Born: May 8, 1996 (age 30); New York City, United States
- Education: California State University, Northridge
- Occupation: Actor
- Relatives: Raye Zaragoza (sister)

Román Zaragoza (born May 8, 1996; Latin American Spanish: [roˈman saɾaˈɡosa]) is an American actor. He is best known for portraying Sasappis, one of the main characters in the CBS sitcom series Ghosts (2021–2026). Zaragoza also voices Sokka in the 2026 animated fantasy film Avatar Aang: The Last Airbender.

== Early life and education ==
Román Zaragoza was born on May 8, 1996, in New York City, United States. His father, lawyer and actor Gregory Zaragoza, is of Akimel Oʼodham and Mexican descent, and his mother, business professor Shirley Zaragoza, is of Taiwanese and Japanese descent, and an immigrant from Japan. He also has two sisters, including singer Raye Zaragoza. He grew up in New York City, within the neighbourhood of Greenwich Village in the borough of Manhattan. At the age of 11, his family moved to Los Angeles, California. He began acting at a young age, having roles on stage, and in television commercials. At the age of 15, Zaragoza begun working with Native Voices at the Autry, a Native American theatre company. He graduated from the California State University in Northridge in Los Angeles.

== Career ==
Since 2021, he portrays Sasappis, one of the main characters in the CBS sitcom series Ghosts (2021–present). In 2022, he was also producer and actor in the short film This Is Their Land, recounting the events of the Modoc War of 1872, between the Modoc people and the United States Army in Northern California. Zaragoza also voices Sokka in the 2026 animated fantasy film Avatar Aang: The Last Airbender.

== Filmography ==
=== Film ===
Year	Title	Role	Notes
2010	Everyday Kid	Russell	Television film
2015	Being Bryan	Ron	Short film
2015	The Oblivious	Max	Short film
2015	Studio City	Teenager	Television film
2015	You Could Be Happy	Garrett	Short film
2017	30 seconds	Don	Short film
2019	Shadow Wolves	Junior	Feature film
2021	Abides	Jack	Short film
2022	This Is Their Land	Young Modoc person	Short film; also producer
2024	Window Breaker	Fence	Short film
2026	Avatar Aang: The Last Airbender	Sokka	Feature film; voice

=== Television ===
Year	Title	Role	Notes
2014–2015	Austin & Ally	Miles	Television series; 3 episodes
2016	Those Who Can't	Todd	Television series; episode: "White Guilt Trip"
2019	Stumptown	Leigh Green	Television series; episode: "The Other Woman"
2021–2026	Ghosts	Sasappis	Television series; main role; 84 episodes
2022–2023	Spirit Rangers	Miy	Television series; voice; 4 episodes
2023	Gone Native	Narrator	Television series; voice; episode: "Dear legendary horror author Stephen King, instead of using Indian Burial Grounds in your books, have you thought of using European burial grounds?"
