= Manuela Saragosa =

Manuela Saragosa (born September 1967) is a Dutch-Italian radio business journalist, most commonly found on the BBC World Service.

== Early life ==
From 1986-89 she attended the LSE, where she studied for a BSc Econ in International Relations, (2:1). From 1990-91 she attended the SOAS, University of London.

== Career ==
From 1993-97 she worked as a foreign correspondent for the Financial Times (FT). In 1998 she worked for Radio Netherlands Worldwide.

=== BBC World Service ===
In January 1999 she joined the BBC World Service. From October 2004 to March 2005 she was also the BBC's Europe Business Correspondent in Brussels. She has also occasionally reported for BBC Radio 4 on The World Tonight.

On the World Service, she presents Business Daily and World Business Report.

== Personal life ==
She lives in south-west London. She has two children.
