= Saragossa (moth) =

Scientific classification
- Kingdom: Animalia
- Phylum: Arthropoda
- Clade: Pancrustacea
- Class: Insecta
- Order: Lepidoptera
- Superfamily: Noctuoidea
- Family: Noctuidae
- Tribe: Hadenini
- Genus: Saragossa; Staudinger, 1900

Genus of moths

Saragossa is a genus of moths of the family Noctuidae.

== Species ==
- Saragossa bergi (Kuznezov, 1908)
- Saragossa demotica (Püngeler, 1902)
- Saragossa incerta (Staudinger, 1896)
- Saragossa porosa (Eversmann, 1854)
- Saragossa seeboldi Staudinger, 1900
- Saragossa siccanorum (Staudinger, 1870)
- Saragossa uralica Hacker & Fibiger, 2002
