= Peter MacNicol =

American actor (born 1954)

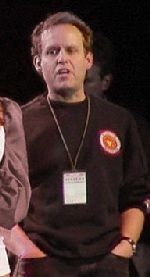
- MacNicol at Eagle Base in 2001
- Born: April 10, 1954 (age 72); Dallas, Texas, U.S.
- Occupation: Actor
- Years active: 1978–present
- Spouse: Martha Cumming (m. 1986)

Peter MacNicol (born April 10, 1954) is an American actor. He received a Theatre World Award for his 1981 Broadway debut in the play Crimes of the Heart. His film roles include: Galen in Dragonslayer (1981), Stingo in Sophie's Choice (1982), Janosz Poha in Ghostbusters II (1989), Gary Granger in Addams Family Values (1993), Renfield in Dracula: Dead and Loving It (1995) and David Langley in Bean (1997).

MacNicol won the Primetime Emmy Award for Outstanding Supporting Actor in a Comedy Series in 2001 for his role as the eccentric lawyer John Cage in the FOX comedy-drama Ally McBeal (1997–2002). He is also known for his television roles as: attorney Alan Birch in the medical drama Chicago Hope (1994–1998), X the Eliminator on Harvey Birdman, Attorney at Law (2000–2007), physicist Dr. Larry Fleinhardt on the CBS crime drama Numbers (2005–2010), Tom Lennox in the sixth season of action-thriller 24 (2007), Doctor Octopus in The Spectacular Spider-Man (2008–09), Dr. Stark on Grey's Anatomy (2010–11), Jeff Kane on the political satire series Veep (2016–2019) and Nigel the Advisor on Tangled: The Series (2017–2020). He also voiced the Mad Hatter in the Batman: Arkham video game series. He also played FBI Deputy Director Simon Sifter during season one of CSI: Cyber (2015–16).

== Early life ==
MacNicol was born on April 10, 1954, in Dallas, Texas, the youngest of five children of Barbara, a homemaker, and John MacNicol, a corporate executive who became an Episcopal priest later in life.

== Career ==
MacNicol performed at the Guthrie Theater in Minneapolis for two seasons from 1978 to 1979. He appeared in productions which included Hamlet and The Pretenders. He made his New York debut in the 1980 off-Broadway play Crimes of the Heart. The production then moved to Broadway in 1981, and he won the Theatre World Award. It was during this production that a casting agent noticed him and auditioned him for a role in the film Sophie's Choice. In 1981 he landed the starring role in his first film, Dragonslayer, opposite Ralph Richardson.

In 1987, MacNicol starred in the Trinity Repertory Company's original production of the stage adaptation of Robert Penn Warren's All the King's Men, which first appeared at the Dallas Theater Center. The adaptation was developed in consultation with the author.

Among his other stage credits is the Broadway production of Black Comedy/White Lies. He has appeared in repertory theater, including the New York Shakespeare Festival where he played title roles in Richard II and Romeo and Juliet; and in Twelfth Night, Rum and Coke and Found a Peanut.

In film, he plays the naive Southern writer who falls in love with Meryl Streep in Sophie's Choice, the museum curator Janosz Poha in Ghostbusters II, and overenthusiastic camp director Gary Granger alongside future Numbers co-star David Krumholtz in Addams Family Values. Other film credits include the films Housesitter and American Blue Note.

From 1992 to 1993, MacNicol starred opposite: John Forsythe, Holland Taylor, David Hyde Pierce and Joseph Gordon-Levitt as press secretary Bradley Grist in the political television comedy The Powers That Be. In addition, he played Mario, a hotel receptionist, in the 1993 Cheers episode "Look Before You Sleep".

In 1994 MacNicol played the role of Alan Birch for the first season and part of the second season of Chicago Hope once creator David E. Kelley departed. He later rejoined Kelley in 1997 by taking a role on another TV series, Ally McBeal, as a main guest star from Season 1 to Season 4 and a recurring character in Season 5. MacNicol is well known for his Ally McBeal performance as eccentric attorney John Cage, for which he won an Emmy Award for Outstanding Supporting Actor in a Comedy Series in 2001. From 2005 to 2010, he starred in the drama Numbers as physicist Dr. Larry Fleinhardt, taking a brief break from the show to perform as Tom Lennox in the sixth season of the hit FOX show 24. MacNicol reprised his role as Lennox in the film 24: Redemption.

MacNicol has lent his voice to several comic book supervillains: Dr. Kirk Langstrom / Man-Bat in The Batman, David Clinton / Chronos in Justice League Unlimited, Professor Ivo in Young Justice, Dr. Otto Octavius / Doctor Octopus in The Spectacular Spider-Man, X The Eliminator in Harvey Birdman, Attorney at Law and the Mad Hatter in the video games Batman: Arkham City, Batman: Arkham Origins, and Batman: Arkham Knight. He also voiced Firefly in G.I. Joe: Renegades.

MacNicol played Dr. Stark, a pediatric surgeon, on Grey's Anatomy.

MacNicol was nominated for an Emmy for outstanding guest actor in the fifth season of Veep; however, his nomination was rescinded because he appeared in "too many of the show’s episodes; the rules require that a guest actor nominee be in less than half of a season." Although MacNicol qualified when his entry was submitted, he later appeared briefly in one more episode. He was nominated again in the same category for the seventh season of Veep.

== Personal life ==
MacNicol has been married to Martha Cumming since 1986.

== Filmography ==
=== Film ===
Year	Title	Role	Notes
1981	Dragonslayer	Galen Bradwarden	
1982	Sophie's Choice	Stingo	
1986	Heat	Cyrus Kinnick	
1986	American Blue Note	Jack Solow	
1989	Ghostbusters II	Dr. Janosz Poha	
1991	Hard Promises	Stuart	
1992	Housesitter	Marty	
1993	Addams Family Values	Gary Granger	
1994	Radioland Murders	Son Writer	
1995	Dracula: Dead and Loving It	Thomas Renfield	
1996	Mojave Moon	Tire Repairman	
1997	Bean	David Langley	
1998	The Secret of NIMH 2: Timmy to the Rescue	Narrator (voice)	Direct-to-video
1999	Baby Geniuses	Dan Bobbins	
2001	Recess: School's Out	Fenwick (voice)	
2002	Balto II: Wolf Quest	Muru (voice)	Direct-to-video
2004	Breakin' All the Rules	Philip Gascon	
2006	Stuart Little 3: Call of the Wild	Troopmaster Bickle (voice)	Direct-to-video
2012	Battleship	Secretary of Defense	
2013	Scooby-Doo! Stage Fright	Dewey Ottoman (voice)	Direct-to-video
2021	Our (Almost Completely True) Love Story	Psycho Date	
2024	Shell	Dr. Thaddeus Brand	
2024	The Day the Earth Blew Up: A Looney Tunes Movie	The Invader (voice)	
TBA	Home Delivery	Howard Evans	

=== Television ===
Year	Title	Role	Notes
1984	Faerie Tale Theatre	Martin	Episode: "The Boy Who Left Home to Find Out About the Shivers"
1987	The Days and Nights of Molly Dodd	Steve Cooper	Episode: "Here's Why They Call the Little One a Jingle and the Big One the Blues"
1990	By Dawn's Early Light	Sedgwick	Television film
1992–1993	The Powers That Be	Bradley Grist	20 episodes
1993	Cheers	Mario	Episode: "Look Before You Sleep"
1994	Tales from the Crypt	Austin Haggard	Episode: "Let the Punishment Fit the Crime"
1994–1995, 1998	Chicago Hope	Alan Birch	31 episodes Viewers for Quality Television Award for Best Supporting Actor in a Quality Drama Series; Nominated—Screen Actors Guild Award for Outstanding Performance by an Ensemble in a Drama Series (1995–96)
1996	The Oz Kids	Ork (voice)	
1997–2002	Ally McBeal	John Cage	103 episodes Writer - Episode: "All of Me"; Director - 3 episodes Primetime Emmy Award for Outstanding Supporting Actor in a Comedy Series (2001); Screen Actors Guild Award for Outstanding Performance by an Ensemble in a Comedy Series (1998); Viewers for Quality Television Award for Best Supporting Actor in a Quality Comedy Series (1999); Nominated—Primetime Emmy Award for Outstanding Supporting Actor in a Comedy Series (1999-2000); Nominated—Satellite Award for Best Supporting Actor – Television Series (2002); Nominated—Screen Actors Guild Award for Outstanding Performance by an Ensemble in a Comedy Series (2001–02); Nominated—Screen Actors Guild Award for Outstanding Performance by a Male Actor in a Comedy Series (1999-2001); Nominated—Viewers for Quality Television Award for Best Supporting Actor in a Comedy Series (1998, 2000)
1999	The Angry Beavers	Kid Friendly (voice)	Episode: "The Legend of Kid Friendly"
1999	Olive, the Other Reindeer	Fido (voice)	Television film
2000	The Wild Thornberrys	Raju (voice)	Episode: "Monkey See, Monkey Don't"
2000	Buzz Lightyear of Star Command	Major (voice)	2 episodes
2003–2007	Harvey Birdman, Attorney at Law	X the Eliminator (voice)	14 episodes
2004–2005	Danny Phantom	Sidney Poindexter (voice)	2 episodes
2004–2008	The Batman	Kirk Langstrom (voice)	3 episodes
2005	Justice League Unlimited	Chronos (voice)	2 episodes
2005–2010	Numbers	Dr. Larry Fleinhardt	94 episodes Writer - 2 episodes
2006	Boston Legal	Dr. Sydney Field	Episode: "Race Ipsa"; Director - Episode: "Chapter Forty-Eight"
2007	24	Tom Lennox	24 episodes
2008	24: Redemption	Tom Lennox	Television film
2008–2009	The Spectacular Spider-Man	Doctor Octopus (voice)	12 episodes
2010	Ben 10: Ultimate Alien	Oliver, Mr. Webb, Forever Knight (voice)	2 episodes
2010–2011	Grey's Anatomy	Dr. Robert Stark	7 episodes
2011	Young Justice	Professor Ivo, Amazo, MONQIs (voice)	2 episodes
2011	G.I. Joe: Renegades	Firefly (voice)	Episode: "Homecoming"
2011	Fairly Legal	Judge Smollet	Episode: "Coming Home"
2012	Game Change	Rick Davis	Television film
2013	Necessary Roughness	Dr. Gunner	3 episodes
2013–2015	Agents of S.H.I.E.L.D.	Professor Elliot Randolph	2 episodes
2014	The Mindy Project	Rabbi David Adler	Episode: "An Officer and a Gynecologist"
2014	Star Wars Rebels	Tseebo (voice)	2 episodes
2014–2016	American Dad!	Angel, Old Man Hanson (voice)	2 episodes
2015	CSI: Cyber	Simon Sifter	Main cast; 13 episodes
2016–2019	Veep	Jeff Kane	9 episodes Nominated—Primetime Emmy Award for Outstanding Guest Actor in a Comedy Series (2019); Previous Primetime Emmy Award nomination revoked due to rule technicality
2017–2020	Tangled: The Series	Nigel the Advisor (voice)	Main cast
2018	The Big Bang Theory	Dr. Robert Wolcott	Episode: "The Reclusive Potential"
2019	A Series of Unfortunate Events	Ishmael	Episode: "The End"
2020–2021	All Rise	Judge Campbell	9 episodes
2022	Birdgirl	Mr. Claude (voice)	Episode: "The Wanky"
2025	All's Fair	Judge Robert DeLancie	Episode: "Divorce Is Like a Death"

=== Video games ===
Year	Title	Role
2008	Harvey Birdman: Attorney at Law	X the Eliminator
2011	Batman: Arkham City	Mad Hatter
2013	Batman: Arkham Origins	Mad Hatter
2015	Batman: Arkham Knight	Mad Hatter
