= The Donor Party =

- Theatrical release poster
- Directed by: Thom Harp
- Screenplay by: Thom Harp
- Produced by: Nancy Leopardi; Ross Kohn; Malin Akerman; Rob Corddry
- Starring: Malin Akerman; Rob Corddry; Jerry O'Connell; Erinn Hayes; Bria Henderson; Ryan Hansen
- Cinematography: Andrew Russo
- Edited by: Grant McFadden
- Music by: Mondo Boys
- Production companies: Vertical Entertainment; Indy Entertainment
- Distributed by: Vertical Entertainment
- Release date: March 3, 2023
- Running time: 93 minutes
- Country: United States
- Language: English

The Donor Party is a 2023 American comedy film written and directed by Thom Harp. It stars Malin Akerman, Rob Corddry, Jerry O'Connell, Erinn Hayes, Bria Henderson, and Ryan Hansen.

It was released on March 3, 2023, by Vertical Entertainment to negative reviews from critics.

== Plot ==
The film centers on Jaclyn (Malin Akerman), who, after a recent breakup, embarks on a quest to fulfill her dream of becoming a mother. Realizing that she can achieve her goal without a husband, she concocts a scheme and recruits her loyal friends, Molly (Erinn Hayes) and Amandine (Bria Henderson), to execute a sperm heist from unwitting donors during the birthday party of Molly's husband Geoff (Rob Corddry). The prospects include Tim (Jerry O'Connell), MJ (Dan Ahdoot), Mateo (Jeff Torres), and Armin (Ryan Hansen).

== Cast ==
- Malin Åkerman as Jaclyn
- Rob Corddry as Geoff
- Jerry O'Connell as Tim
- Ryan Hansen as Armin
- Erinn Hayes as Molly
- Bria Samoné Henderson as Amandine
- Meadow Williams as Barbara
- Dan Ahdoot as MJ
- Jeff Torres as Mateo
- Patty Guggenheim as Sharon
- Cedric Yarbrough as Harrison
- Aarti Mann as Meera
- Rizwan Manji as Kahlil
- Beth Dover as Joyce
- Brit Morgan as Taressa
- Jon Daly as Reese

== Production ==
The Donor Party was written and directed by Thom Harp. When casting the film, Harp wrote Akerman a personal letter asking her to play the lead role. She accepted after reading the script, and enlisted Corddry and Hayes. The film reunited Akerman, Corddry, Hayes, and Dover, who starred together on Childrens Hospital (2010–2016). Nancy Leopardi, Ross Kohn, Akerman, and Corddry produced the film.

== Release ==
In June 2022, Vertical Entertainment acquired distribution rights to the film. The trailer was released on February 6, 2023. The film was released in theaters and on demand on March 3, 2023.

== Reception ==
On Rotten Tomatoes, The Donor Party has a 0% approval rating based on 10 reviews, and an average rating of 3.2. Julian Roman of MovieWeb wrote, "I can fully appreciate this is a vulgar comedy, but The Donor Party makes inartful attempts at serious discussion about sex and parenthood."
