= Raye Zaragoza =

American singer-songwriter (born 1993)

- Born: April 16, 1993 (age 33); Manhattan, New York City, U.S.
- Genres: Folk
- Occupations: Singer; songwriter
- Instruments: Vocals, guitar
- Website: www.rayezaragoza.com

Raye Zaragoza (born April 16, 1993) is an American singer-songwriter.

== Biography ==
Raye Zaragoza was born and raised in Manhattan and moved to Los Angeles at the age of fourteen. Her mother is an immigrant from Japan and her father is of Mexican and Oʼodham heritage. Her great-grandmother was adopted out of her tribe as young child, raised by a white woman and forced to assimilate. Actor Román Zaragoza is her brother.

Raye became involved in school musicals, started playing guitar at age 12, and started writing songs in her late teens. She released her debut EP Heroine in 2015. She started to gain national attention in 2016 with the song "In The River," protesting the Dakota Access Pipeline. Raye and her brother made a video for "In The River" that included facts about Standing Rock and it received 100,000 views overnight. The song was awarded the Global Music Awards' 2017 Heretic Award for Protest/Activist Music and the Honesty Oscars' award for Best Song.

In 2017, she independently released her debut album Fight For You. Her music covers topics related to social justice and her experience as a woman of color. Multiple songs on Fight For You address the Dakota Access Pipeline. "Driving to Standing Rock" portrays the power of protest, specifically of the NoDAPL movement. The song "American Dream" was written in reaction to Donald Trump's election. The album also includes love songs and songs about New York City.

In 2019, she released live recordings of four songs — new song "Warrior," two songs from Fight For You, and one song from the Heroine EP — on an EP entitled Live at Rockwood Music Hall which premiered first on Popmatters.

She cites Joni Mitchell, Carole King, Joan Baez, and Buffy St. Marie as influences.

In 2018, Zaragoza toured with Dispatch and Nahko and Medicine for the People raising funds for Generation Indigenous.

Her sophomore album Woman In Color produced by Tucker Martine was released October 23, 2020 on her own label Rebel River Records and made year-end lists from NPR Music and PopMatters. The album shows Raye embracing all aspects of her mixed-race identity in song.

In 2021, Zaragoza was awarded the Rising Tide Award by the International Folk Music Awards presented by Folk Alliance International.

== Discography ==
- Heroine EP (2015)
- Fight For You (2017)
- Live at Rockwood Music Hall EP (2019)
- Woman in Color (2020)
- Hold That Spirit (2023)
