= Spanish ship Zaragoza =

Various Spanish Navy ships

Two ships of the Spanish Navy have borne the name Zaragoza, after the Battle of Saragossa:

- Zaragoza, an armed launch of the latter half of the 19th century.
- Zaragoza, an armored frigate commissioned in 1868 and retired in the 1890s.

== See also ==
- Condestable Zaragoza, a fishery patrol vessel which entered service in 1919.
- Condestable Zaragoza (A-66), a coastal water tanker in service from 1981 to 2009.
