= Ken Reid (comedian) =

American comedian

Kenneth W. Reid is an American standup comedian based in Boston.

== Education ==
Reid received his bachelor's degree from Northeastern University in 2003. He attended Melrose High School and also studied at Goldsmiths, University of London.

== Comedy career ==
Reid began performing stand-up comedy while a student at Goldsmiths, University of London in the UK. He returned to Boston in 2003 and became a regular performer at the Comedy Studio in Cambridge, Massachusetts.

Reid was a member of comedy troupe The Untrainables, a group of standup performers at ImprovBoston.

He has continued performing and presenting in the Boston area, including the 2006 Boston Music Awards, the Women in Comedy Festival, the Charleston Comedy Festival, the Eugene Mirman Comedy Festival, and the Bridgetown Comedy Festival.

Reid has toured with Todd Barry, and been the opening act for numerous comedians, including Patton Oswalt, Tig Notaro, Bob Saget, and John Oliver.

He was featured in a photo spread for The Improper Bostonian magazine in their June 2009 "Sex and Love" issue, recreating the iconic Marilyn Monroe final photo shoot. That same year, he was featured in an ad campaign for jokes.com that ran on Comedy Central and was featured in Time Out New York as their "Joke of the Week" in September.

In 2010 and 2012 he was nominated by The Boston Phoenix as Best Comedian in Boston, and in 2013 was named "One of Boston's Best Comics and Standup Comedians" by CBS 4 Boston.

Reid is the creator of "The Damaged Goods Auction," a storytelling show in which performers tell stories about objects from their lives and then auction the object off to the audience.

Reid is a frequent podcast guest, including on Hang Out with Me with Myq Kaplan, Unfictional on KCRW, The Dana Gould Hour, Doug Loves Movies and Risk!

In February 2014 Reid started a podcast of his own, TV Guidance Counselor, in which he and a fellow comedian discuss viewing choices from old editions of TV Guide. Guests have included Amy Sedaris, Vanessa Angel, Julia Duffy, Laura Kightlinger, Melanie Chartoff, Laraine Newman, Michael Ian Black and Kumail Nanjiani. That same year, Reid became the host and co-creator of The Member's Lounge, a Variety Talk show.

In November 2018, his exchange with conservative pundit Ann Coulter went viral.

== Personal life ==
Reid was a member of mid-1990s Boston punk band: 30 Seconds Over Tokyo. The band formed in the same scene as Dropkick Murphys, The Ducky Boys, and The Unseen.

== See also ==
- List of comedians
