= Finding Sofia =

Finding Sofía
- Directed by: Nico Casavecchia
- Written by: Nico Casavecchia
- Produced by: Andrew Geller; Serge Patzak; Sam Penfield; Arvind Palep; Sam Huntington
- Starring: Sam Huntington; Andrea Carballo; Rafael Spregelburd
- Cinematography: Eloi Moli
- Edited by: Lynn Hobson
- Music by: Tomás Becú; Juan Manuel Marín Fraga
- Release date: April 2016 (Buenos Aires)
- Running time: 112 minutes
- Countries: Argentina; United States
- Languages: English; Spanish

Finding Sofía is a 2016 comedy film written and directed by Nico Casavecchia. The film is Casavecchia's first feature film and was produced by 1stAveMachine. It premiered in 2016 on the Buenos Aires International Festival of Independent Cinema and was included in the festival's Argentine official competition. The picture features Sam Huntington, Andrea Carballo, Rafael Spregelburd, and Sofía Brihet.

== Production ==
Finding Sofia is the first feature film produced and financed by 1stAveMachine, a company that so far focused on video, digital and experimental content. It's also Casavecchia's debut in the big screen, though he's an awarded animated shorts filmmaker. The film was written inspired by the dilemma of being a filmmaker in a world already saturated with images. The movie portrays several pieces of Alex's animation (made by Casavecchia himself) and Victor's paintings (made for the film by Argentine painter, Juan José Cambre). It was filmed on an island in El Tigre, a region in the outskirts north of Buenos Aires crossed by rivers.
