= Canal180 =

Portuguese TV channel

Canal 180
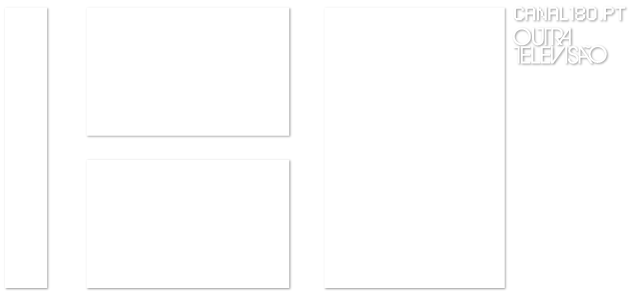
- Country: Portugal
- Broadcast area: Portugal

Programming
- Picture format: 16:9 1080i (HDTV)

Ownership
- Owner: OSTV

History
- Launched: 25 April 2011

Links
- Website: Canal 180

Canal180 is a Portuguese editorial platform, digital cable and open source TV channel entirely dedicated to culture, arts and creativity.

Launched on 25 April 2011 by the media company OSTV, Canal180 was founded by João Vasconcelos, its current executive director, and by Nuno Alves. Rita Moreira, who previously worked at Portuguese radio channel Antena 3, is the channel's announcer. Available on Portuguese cable TV on position 180, the channel is distributed by NOS, MEO and Vodafone TV.

Starting as a TV channel, Canal180 has over time morphed into an ecosystem of broadcast, social media content, and content production not dedicated for TV.

Part of the funding for Canal180 came from the Creative Industries National Award, an award appointed by Unicer and Serralves Foundation, in 2010. The ident of the channel was awarded the Bronze Lion at Cannes Lions International Festival of Creativity in 2012. Canal180 introduced several innovations never seen before on Portuguese TV: it's the first national channel completely dedicated to culture and creativity. Based on a low cost business model, the transmission of Canal180 consists on video blocks. There are no studios or régies. Also, the channel reclaims the title of being the first open source TV channel in the world. The daily TV grid is composed of national content produced by Canal180, like the daily Mag, a series that goes through Portugal's cultural agenda, and also international series such as Focus Forward, The Avant/Garde Diaries, Fubiz TV, Gestalten TV and Like Knows Like, among others. Several of these contents are funded by well-known brands like Mercedes-Benz, GE or Orange.

Another original project produced by Canal180 is 180 ID, a series of short documentaries featuring artists like David Wilson, Hiro Murai, Andreas Johnsen, Kirsten Lepore, Nico Casavecchia, Kristoffer Borgli, and Layzell Bros. In 2014, the channel extended the open source model to a short film on Optimus Primavera Sound Porto 2013, Driving Without License, a collaborative work between the audience and Canal180's team. The channel, based in Porto, regularly covers popular music festivals like Optimus Primavera Sound and Paredes de Coura Festival. In 2012, Canal180 was also a partner of the Guimarães European Capital of Culture initiative.
