= Artificial lattice =

Artificial lattice is a term encompassing every atomic-scale structures designed and controlled to confine electrons onto a chosen lattice. Research has been done on multiple geometries and one of the most notable being what is called molecular graphene (in order to mimic graphene structure). Molecular graphene is a part of two-dimensional artificial lattices.

Artificial lattices can be studied to test theoretical topology predictions or for their engineered electronic proprieties. Those materials should still be considered at a research stage.

== Synthesis ==
Synthesis of such materials is often achieved using Atomic manipulation by scanning tunneling microscope or atomic force microscope. More and more efforts are being made to achieve a similar atomic precision with focused electron beams. Those methods aren't adapted for the mass production of nanostructures as each molecule has to be moved one by one. To solve this issue, new methods of synthesize those compounds are being researched such as chemical bottom-up synthesis.

Currently, multiple methods, often complementary, exist for synthesizing such materials :

- Patterning of electron gas extension : this is the method used when the lattice is built from adsorbates over Cu(111) surfaces.
- Using localized orbitals from the atomic sites.

In the case of molecular graphene, carbon monoxide molecules on Cu(111) surface can be used. Other materials have been shown to be suitable for making molecular graphene suchlike Coronene. Substrates such as Cu(111) are interesting because they have a 2D free-electron-like surface state. If CO molecules are placed onto appropriate positions, as the Cu(111) surface state is scattered from the CO molecules, the surface state electron gas can be confined onto different geometries (e.g. a honeycomb).

== Proprieties ==
The main interest of artificial lattice is that its lattice proprieties (such as the lattice spacing) can be precisely controlled. In the case of molecular graphene, similarities in structure with graphene can provide an indirect to study graphene proprieties. Using a triaxial strain, it is possible to study how graphene react to intense magnetic fields. This strain (creating what is called a pseudo magnetic field) will alter the electronic structure of the molecule in the same fashion a magnetic field would. With this method, we can study how graphene would react to field up to 60 T.

Some artificial lattices, such as molecular graphene, also exhibits semi-conductors' behaviors. PNP junctions can be made with the juxtaposition of two artificial graphene lattices with different lattice spacing. Indeed, Fermi level of a molecular graphene is directly linked to its lattice spacing.

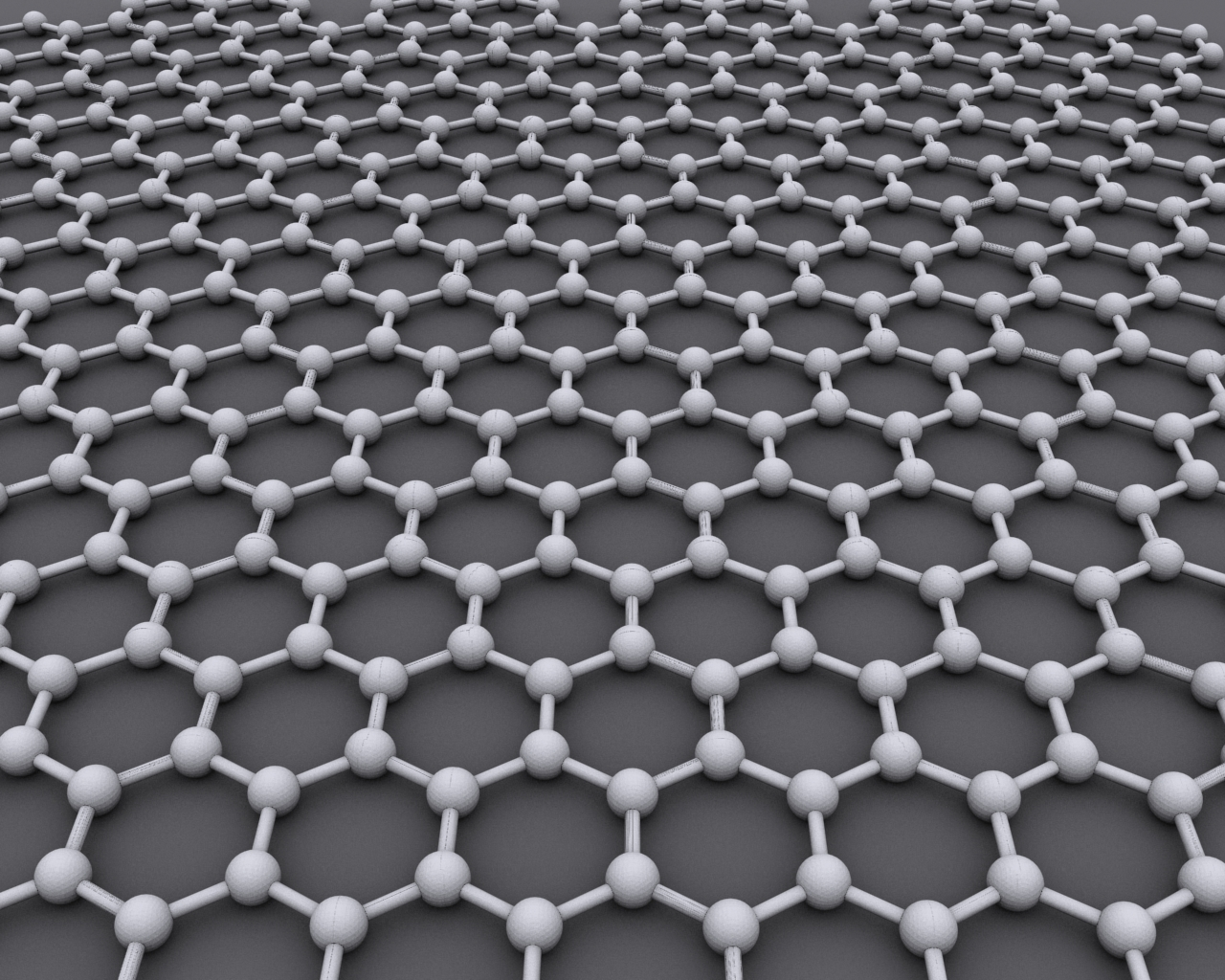
Graphene is a lattice that can be mimicked in artificial lattices

Multiple geometries for artificial lattices has been researched and created. Some of those geometries are :

- Graphene
- Lieb lattices
- Sierpiński triangle
- Penrose tiling
- Kagome lattice
- Kekulé lattice

Some of those geometries have a non-integer Hausdorff dimension as they are fractals. Those dimensions can be approximated using box counting methods. This dimension will dictate how electrons of the artificial lattice will behave and move in space.

== See also ==
- Two-dimensional materials
- Graphene
- Scanning tunneling microscope
- Atomic manipulation

== Notes ==
1. Bottom-up synthesis are chemical processes used in nanotechnologies to create nanoparticles. The principle is to start from atoms, then to gather them in clusters of atoms which will be finally merged into nanoparticles.
2. Triaxial strain is obtained in molecular graphene with a modification of the arrangement of molecules.
