= Atomic manipulation =

Atomic manipulation is the process of moving single atoms on a substrate using a scanning tunneling microscope (STM). The atomic manipulation is a surface science technique usually used to create artificial objects on the substrate made out of atoms and to study electronic behavior of matter. These objects do not occur in nature and therefore need to be created artificially. The first demonstration of atomic manipulation was done by IBM scientists in 1989, when they created IBM in atoms.

== Vertical manipulation ==
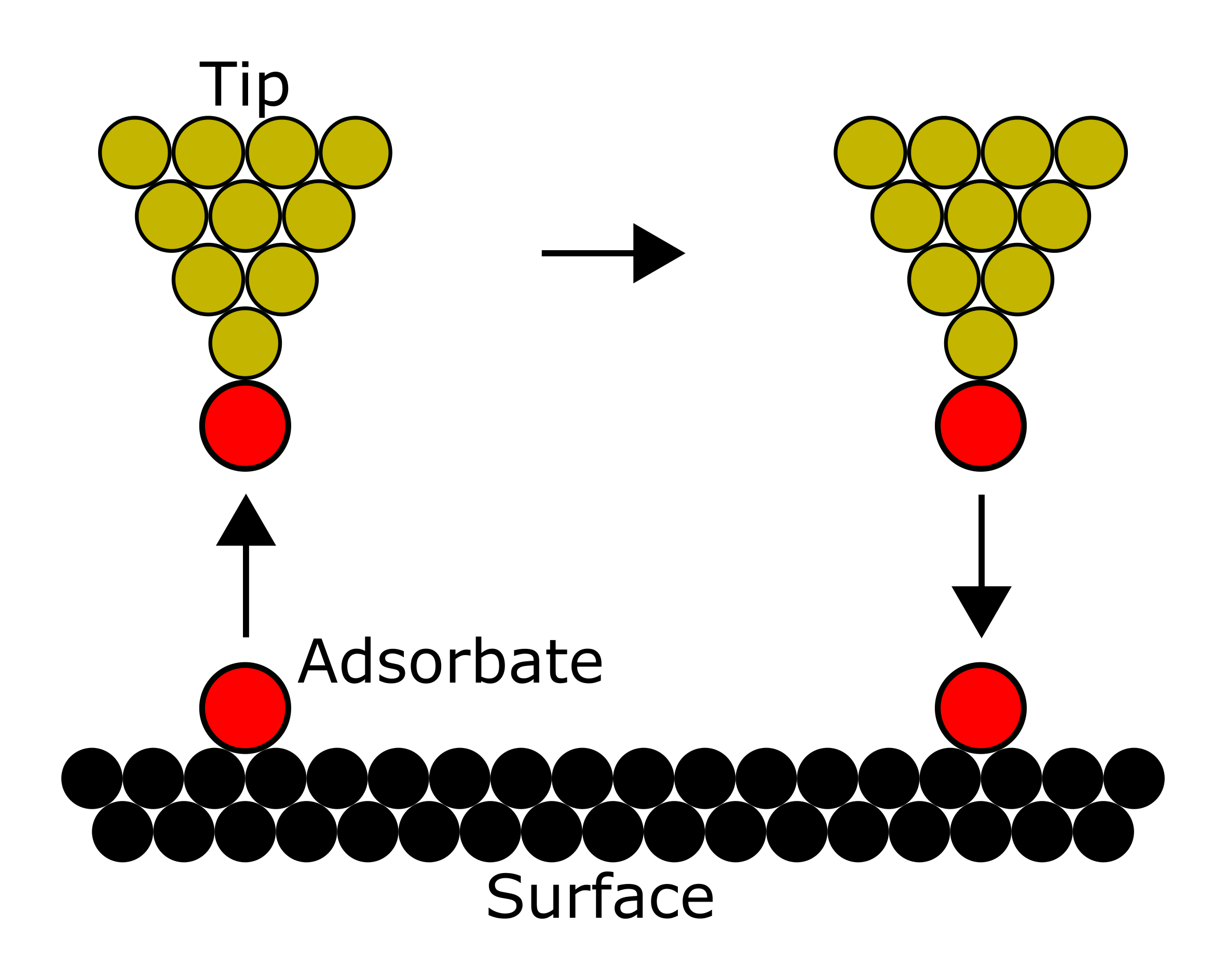
Schematics of Vertical manipulation.

Vertical manipulation is a process of transferring an atom from substrate to STM tip, repositioning the STM tip and transferring the atom back on a desired position. Transferring an atom from substrate to STM tip is done by placing the tip above the atom in a constant current mode, turning off the feedback loop and applying high bias for a few seconds. In some cases it is also required to slowly approach the tip while applying high bias. Sudden spikes or drops in current during this process correspond to either transfer or to the atom being pushed away from the given spot. As such, there is always some level of randomness in this process. Transferring an atom from STM tip to substrate is done the same way but by applying opposite bias.

== Lateral manipulation ==
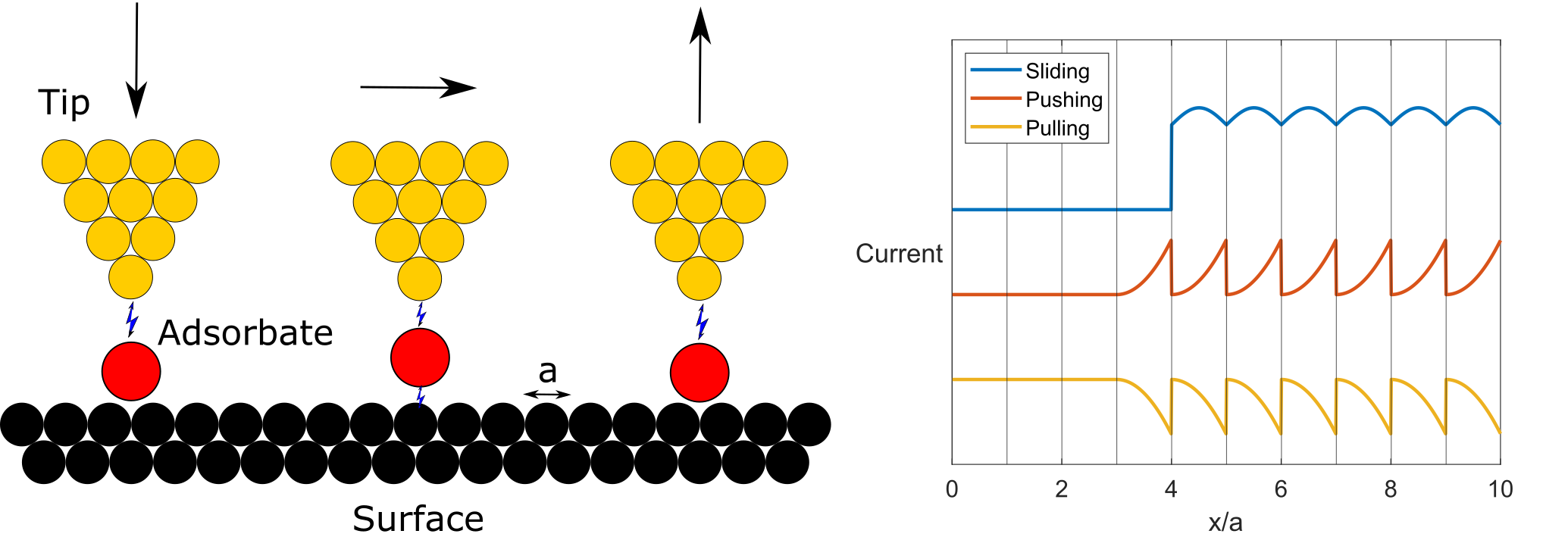
The steps of lateral atom manipulation and schematic tunneling current signals for different types of lateral motion. The current signal schematics are offset for clarity.

Lateral manipulation means moving an adsorbate on the surface by making a temporary chemical or physical bond between the STM tip and the adsorbate. A typical lateral manipulation sequence begins by positioning the tip close to the adsorbate, bringing the tip close to the surface by increasing the tunneling current setpoint, moving the tip along a desired route and finally retracting the tip to normal scanning height. Lateral manipulation is typically applied to strongly bound adsorbates, such as metal adatoms on metal surfaces. The probability that the surface adsorbate moves the same distance traveled by the tip is strongly dependent on the tip conditions.

Depending on the tip apex and the surface/adsorbate system, the lateral motion can occur by pushing, pulling or sliding of the adsorbate. These modes result in distinct tunneling current signals during the lateral motion. For example, periodic steps in the tunneling current indicate that the adsorbate is “jumping” between adsorption sites while following the tip: this means the tip pushes or pulls the adsorbate.

== Notable experiments ==
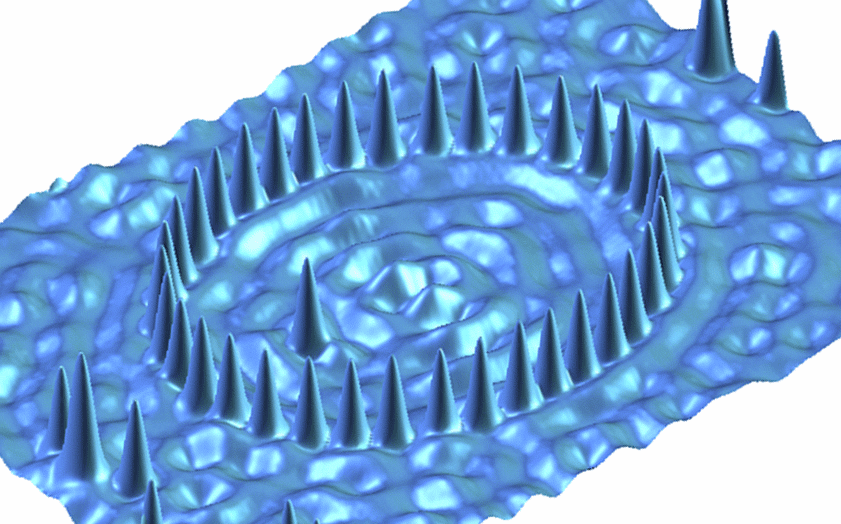
An elliptical quantum corral of Co atoms on a Cu(111) surface

Several groups have applied atomic manipulation techniques for artistic purposes to demonstrate control over the adatom positions. These include various institutional logos and a movie called A Boy and His Atom composed of individual STM scans by IBM researchers.

Several notable condensed matter physics experiments have been realized with atomic manipulation techniques. These include the demonstration of electron confinement in so-called quantum corrals by Michael F. Crommie et al., and the subsequent quantum mirage experiment, where the Kondo signature of an adatom was reflected from one focus to another in an elliptical quantum corral.

Atomic manipulation has also sparked interest as a computation platform. Andreas J. Heinrich et al. built logic gates out of molecular cascades of CO adsorbates, and Kalff et al. demonstrated a rewritable kilobyte memory made of individual atoms.

Recent experiments on artificial lattice structures have utilized atomic manipulation techniques to study the electronic properties of Lieb lattices, artificial graphene and Sierpiński triangles.
