= Teeny Ted from Turnip Town =

World's smallest reproduction of a printed book

- Author: Malcolm Douglas Chaplin
- Publisher: Robert Chaplin
- Publication date: 2007
- Pages: 30
- ISBN: 9781894897174

Teeny Ted from Turnip Town (2007), published by Robert Chaplin, is certified by Guinness World Records as the world's smallest reproduction of a printed book. The book was produced in the Nano Imaging Laboratory at Simon Fraser University in Vancouver, British Columbia, Canada, with the assistance of SFU scientists Li Yang and Karen Kavanagh.

The book's size is 0.07 mm x 0.10 mm. The letters are carved into 30 microtablets on a polished piece of single crystalline silicon, using a focused-gallium-ion beam with a minimum diameter of 7 nanometers (this was compared to the head of a pin at 2 mm, 2,000,000 nm, across). The book has its own ISBN, 978-1-894897-17-4.

The story was written by Malcolm Douglas Chaplin and is "a fable about Teeny Ted's victory in the turnip contest at the annual county fair."

The book has been published in a limited edition of 100 copies by the laboratory and requires a scanning electron microscope to read the text.

In December 2012, a Library Edition of the book was published with a full title of Teeny Ted from Turnip Town & the Tale of Scale: A Scientific Book of Word Puzzles and an ISBN 978-1-894897-36-5. On the title page it is referred to as the "Large Print Edition of the World's Smallest Book". The book was published using funds from a successful Kickstarter campaign with contributors' names shown on the dust jacket.

== See also ==
- Nanotechnology
- Limited edition books
- List of nanotechnology applications
- A Boy and His Atom, a stop-motion film created in a microscopic (molecular) scale
