= Far Hills Country Day School =

School in New Jersey, United States

Coordinates: 40.697002°N 74.617161°W

- Far Hills, (Somerset County), New Jersey 07931

Information
- Motto: A Balanced Education: Strength of Mind • Strength of Character
- Established: 1929
- Head of school: Georgia S. Zaiser
- Faculty: 80% with Masters Degree or Higher
- Grades: Preschool - Grade 8
- Enrollment: 290 (as of 2020)
- Colors: Green and White
- Website: www.fhcds.org

Far Hills Country Day School (FHCDS) is a private, co-educational Preschool-Grade 8 school located in Far Hills, New Jersey. The school is situated on a 54-acre (22 ha) campus that include learning gardens, computer labs, media centers, a performing arts center, a large athletics center including a climbing wall, outdoor fields, tennis courts, ropes challenge course, meadows, a pond, and woodlands.

== Academics ==
The school's curriculum provides an education in English literature, English language, mathematics, science, and Latin.

== Athletics ==
All students participate in physical education between pre-kindergarten and fourth grade and in the interscholastic athletics program between fifth and eighth grade. The athletic program includes basketball, cross-country, cross-fit, fencing, field hockey, ice hockey, lacrosse, soccer, tennis, track, and volleyball.

While the fifth grade participates in some sports, they do not compete against other schools.

== Testing assessments ==
ERB Testing begins in third through eighth grade to benchmark students’ academic progress against other independent school students. In fourth and seventh grade, the Writing Assessment Program is used to provide a comprehensive and direct analysis of students' writing ability benchmarked against other independent school students. Upper School Students also take the SSAT, a standardized test used for secondary independent school admissions.

== Popular culture ==
When alumna Christine Todd Whitman appeared on Celebrity Jeopardy! in 2004, one of the beneficiaries was Far Hills Country Day School.

== Notable alumni ==
- Nicholas F. Brady (born 1930), former United States Secretary of the Treasury who also briefly represented New Jersey in the United States Senate.
- Steve Forbes (born 1947), editor-in-chief of Forbes.
- Asher Grodman (born 1987), actor and producer who stars in the CBS series Ghosts
- Christine Todd Whitman (born 1947), former Governor of New Jersey.
- Frederica von Stade (born 1945), mezzo-soprano.
