= Freshman Orientation =

- Directed by: Ryan Shiraki
- Written by: Ryan Shiraki
- Starring: Sam Huntington; Kaitlin Doubleday; Marla Sokoloff; Mike Erwin; Heather Matarazzo; John Goodman
- Music by: tomandandy
- Distributed by: Element Films
- Release date: January 18, 2004
- Running time: 92 minutes
- Country: United States
- Language: English

Freshman Orientation (also known as Home of Phobia) is a 2004 American romantic comedy film directed by Ryan Shiraki, starring Sam Huntington and Kaitlin Doubleday.

== Plot ==
Clay (Sam Huntington) is an incoming college freshman. The night before he leaves, he is getting oral sex from his new girlfriend Marjorie (Marla Sokoloff). The relationship does not last.

Amanda (Kaitlin Doubleday) is another incoming freshman from Pittsburgh and is getting dropped off at a sorority house by her mother, a legacy member of the sorority. Amanda has a sorority scholarship to go to the school.

Clay goes to a party with his friend Matt (Mike Erwin), where he meets Amanda and tries to hook up with her, only to lose her to another man. Clay returns home only to notice that his roommate hanged himself. Clay and Matt move in.

Amanda's sorority is going through the initiation process. Each pledge must draw from a hat and find a man described on the piece of paper to get to fall in love with her. Amanda's selection is a gay man. The mission is for them to bring their dates to a party in 3 weeks and dump them.

Clay and Matt go to check out the sorority Amanda is in. Clay concludes that they need to become frat boys in order to go out with one of those girls. They try to join a fraternity. When they are passed out, a frat member drags them by their feet, strips them naked, and puts them in a sleeping bag together and places them in the quad for them to be humiliated. Now everyone in school thinks they are gay. Amanda is searching out a gay guy to go out with and when she sees Clay, realizing that he was one of the two guys in the sleeping bag, goes up to talk to him, thinking he's gay. Clay slips up and claims that he is. Now that he's claimed to be gay, he goes out to learn more about homosexuality and how to be a gay person, including joining the on-campus LGBT club and going to a gay bar. Clay asks the bar owner Rodney (John Goodman) how to be gay and is given instruction on everything, including how to dress and how to act.

Clay and Amanda go out to a club where Clay sings on stage. Their friendship continues to blossom. Amanda kisses Clay, but then regrets it shortly afterwards because she still thinks he's gay. Clay tries to tell her the truth when she's in his dorm room, but she leaves before that opportunity. Amanda wants to back out of the deal she was under, but Serena, the sorority head, threatens to kick her out. Once again, Clay tries calling Amanda to come clean that he's not really gay. Sherman, whom he met at the gay bar, assaults him for not going out with him. Clay is knocked out and taken to the hospital, where he recovers quickly. His friend Brennan, who found him knocked out, thinks the fraternity brothers did it and tries to tell it to a campus police officer.

Brennan goes to the LGBT Club and claims that Clay was gay bashed and that the campus police are covering it up. The Club therefore thinks a hate crime was committed and they arrange to have all of the historically oppressed minority groups unite and go fight against the fraternity.

Meanwhile, Amanda tries to prevent Clay from going to the upcoming party because she doesn't want to break up with him. Clay nevertheless shows up and after seeing a number of break ups on the spot, realizes that it was a set-up and dumps Amanda. He returns and discovers that Matt is gay.

When walking across campus the next day, Clay sees posters up with his picture on them, claiming him to be the victim of a hate crime. He sees Marjorie, who's now lesbian, putting up one and asks her to take it off. He also reveals to her that he's not even gay and she gets mad.

Clay sees Professor Jackson in the library and she reveals that she knew the whole time that he wasn't gay. After a talk with her, he decides to go make up with Amanda. He shows up at a fraternity house, where a party is being held, and sees a brawl going on between the minority groups and the fraternity and sorority. He gets on stage and gets everyone's attention. He reveals that Sherman was the attacker and the LGBT Club members get mad at Sherman. Clay reveals to everyone that he's not gay and that he's in love with Amanda. He tries to get everyone in the room to reconcile, but they start rioting when a black woman is called “dyke”. Amanda storms out of the house. Clay tries to get back with her, but she still leaves and decides to go back to Pittsburgh.

Clay goes back to the gay bar where he reveals to Rodney that he wasn't gay and that he was only pretending in order to get Amanda to like him. He asks Rodney if he's mad, who responds by saying that he isn't and feels honored to hear a straight man wanting to be gay.

Amanda, who has lost her scholarship but got a job at a make-up counter, is seen sitting at a bus stop. Clay goes up to her and tells her that pretending to be gay made him a better person. They rekindle their relationship and Amanda, having already missed her bus, misses the next bus, in order to spend a little more time with Clay.

== Cast ==
- Sam Huntington as Clay
- Kaitlin Doubleday as Amanda
- Marla Sokoloff as Marjorie
- Mike Erwin as Matt
- Heather Matarazzo as Jessica
- Jud Tylor as Serena
- John Goodman as Rodney

== Reception ==
=== Critical response ===
Home of Phobia received mixed reviews from critics. Rotten Tomatoes gave the film a score of 32% based on reviews from 22 critics, or an average score of 4.6/10. Metacritic gave the film an average score of 45 out of 100 based on reviews from 9 critics.
