= Sam Huntington =

American actor

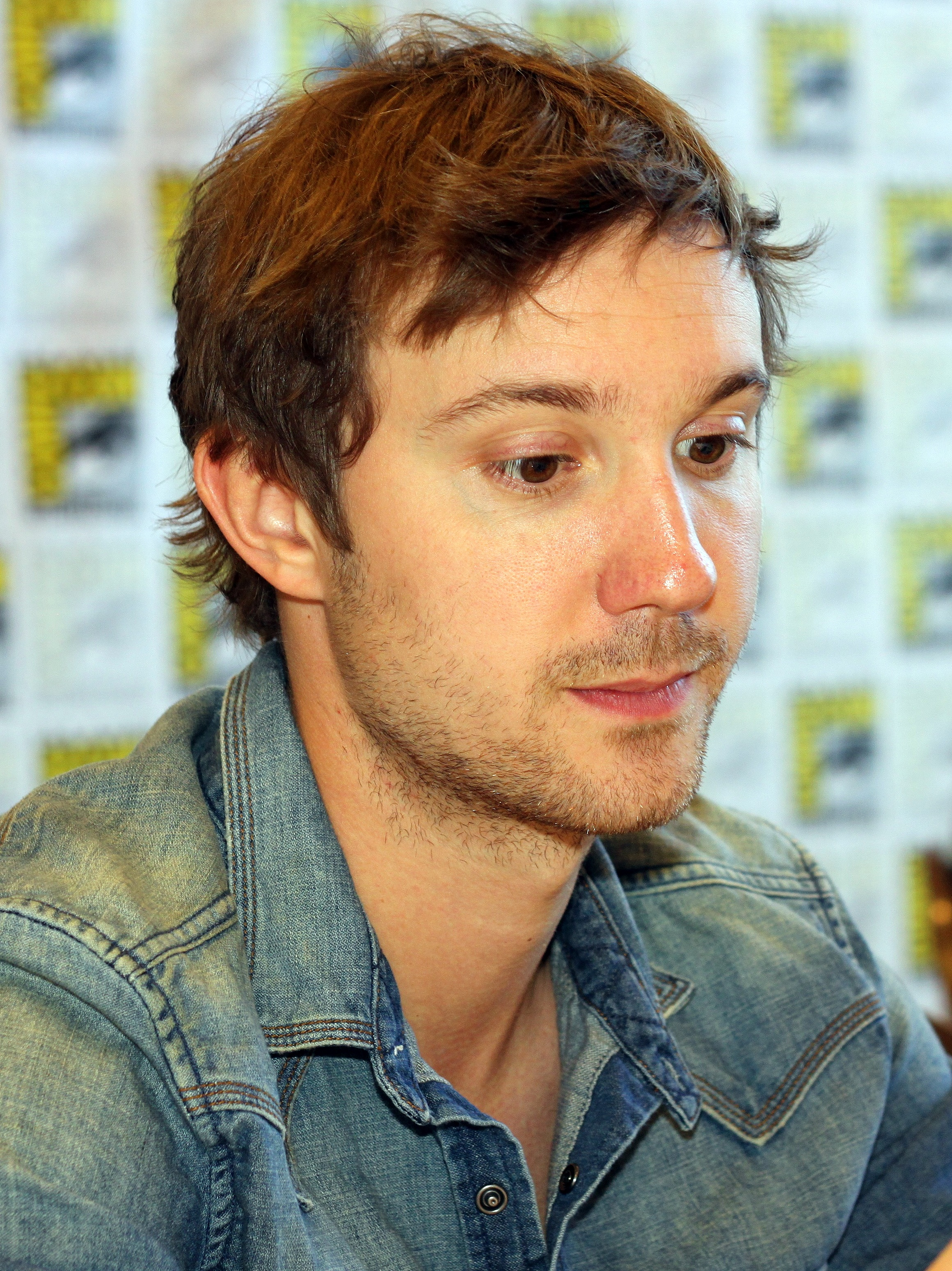
- Huntington in 2011
- Born: April 1, 1982 (age 44); Peterborough, New Hampshire, U.S.
- Occupation: Actor
- Years active: 1995–present
- Spouse: Rachel Klein (m. 2006)
- Children: 2
- Relatives: Ralph Bellamy (great-uncle)

Sam Huntington (born April 1, 1982) is an American actor. He is best known for his roles as Josh Levison on the Syfy series Being Human (2011–2014), Mimi-Siku in the Tim Allen film Jungle 2 Jungle (1997), and Jimmy Olsen in the superhero film Superman Returns (2006). He also played the recurring role of Mitchie Mendelson on the Fox series Rosewood (2015–2017). His other notable credits include Detroit Rock City (1999), Not Another Teen Movie (2001), Fanboys (2009), Dylan Dog: Dead of Night (2011), Veronica Mars (2014), Sully (2016), Good Girls (2018), and The Last Stop in Yuma County (2023).

== Early life ==
Huntington was born on April 1, 1982 to David Sherwood Huntington Jr. and Christine Stabile in Peterborough, New Hampshire, and raised in Hancock. His mother owned and operated the Black Box Theatre, where Huntington started his career. Huntington's great-uncle was actor Ralph Bellamy.

== Career ==
Huntington's first role was in the 1995 instructional video "Microsoft Windows 95 Video Guide" playing the character "Joystick Johnny", starring Jennifer Aniston and Matthew Perry. Huntington's second role was in the 1996 television film Harvest of Fire, which starred Lolita Davidovich. He then appeared opposite Tim Allen in Disney's Jungle 2 Jungle the following year. He has appeared in many feature films such as Detroit Rock City, Not Another Teen Movie, Sleepover, Rolling Kansas, Freshman Orientation, In Enemy Hands and River's End. He has also guest starred in television series such as CSI: Miami, CSI: NY, Law & Order, and Veronica Mars. He was also in the History Channel's documentary The States, when it covered New Hampshire.

Huntington appeared in Bryan Singer's 2006 film Superman Returns as Jimmy Olsen. He starred in the 2009 comedy film Fanboys, and again co-starred with Superman actor Brandon Routh in the live action film adaptation of Dylan Dog: Dead of Night.

In 2011, he was cast in the Syfy television series Being Human as Josh Levison, a werewolf. The series lasted four 13-episode seasons (a total of 52 episodes), and its final episode aired in April 2014. He also served as a guest on the second season of the reality television game show Face Off.

From autumn 2015 through spring 2017, Huntington appeared as the "special guest star" in his recurring role of quirky coroner Mitchie Mendelson on the Fox series Rosewood. The series was cancelled in May 2017 after two seasons.

On December 7, 2017, Huntington appeared briefly in the role of detective Sammy in USA Network's telefilm Psych: The Movie.

== Personal life ==
Huntington married actress and producer Rachel Klein in 2006. Together they have two children.

== Filmography ==
Year	Production	Role	Notes
1995	Microsoft Windows 95 Video Guide	Joystick Johnny	Instructional video
1996	Harvest of Fire	Nathan Hostetler	Television film; uncredited
1997	Jungle 2 Jungle	Mimi-Siku	Nominated – Saturn Award for Best Performance by a Younger Actor
1997	Law & Order	Terry Lawlor	1 episode
1999	Detroit Rock City	Jam	
2001	Not Another Teen Movie	Ox	
2003	Rolling Kansas	Dinkadoo Murphy	
2004	Freshman Orientation	Clay	
2004	In Enemy Hands	Virgil Wright	
2004	Raising Genius	Bic	
2004	Sleepover	Ren	
2004	CSI: Miami	Justin Gillespie	1 episode
2004–2005	Veronica Mars	Luke Haldeman	Episodes: "You Think You Know Somebody" and "A Trip to the Dentist"
2005	River's End	Clay Watkins	
2005	CSI: NY	Connor Mulcahy	1 episode
2006	Superman Returns	Jimmy Olsen	
2006	Superman Returns: The Video Game	Jimmy Olsen	Video game; voice role
2007	Two Dreadful Children		Television film; voice role
2007	It's a Mall World	Dean	Miniseries
2007–2008	Cavemen	Andy Claybrook	8 episodes
2008	Looking Up Dresses	Jade Williams	Short film
2009	Fanboys	Eric	
2010	Human Target	John Gray	1 episode
2010	Tug		
2010	Glenn Martin, DDS		1 episode; voice role
2011	Dylan Dog: Dead of Night	Marcus	
2011–2014	Being Human	Josh Levison	Main role
2012	Warehouse 13	Ethan	Recurring role
2013	Three Night Stand	Carl	
2014	Veronica Mars	Luke Haldeman	
2014	The Throwaways	Drew Reynolds	
2015–2017	Rosewood	Mitchie Mendelson	Recurring role
2016	Finding Sofia	Alex	
2016	The Gender Card Flip	Bret Johnson	
2016	Sully	Jeff Kolodjay	
2017	The Expanse	Solomon Epstein	1 episode
2017	Psych: The Movie	Sammy	Television film
2018	iZombie	Allan Fox	1 episode
2018	Seven Stages to Achieve Eternal Bliss	Paul	
2019	Good Girls	Noah	Recurring role
2019	The Resident	Taylor Emigh	1 episode
2023	The Last Stop in Yuma County	David	
2025	Bride Hard	Ryan	
2025	Out of Order	Paul	
2025	A Man on the Inside	Max Griffin	6 episodes
