= Asher Grodman =

American actor (born 1987)

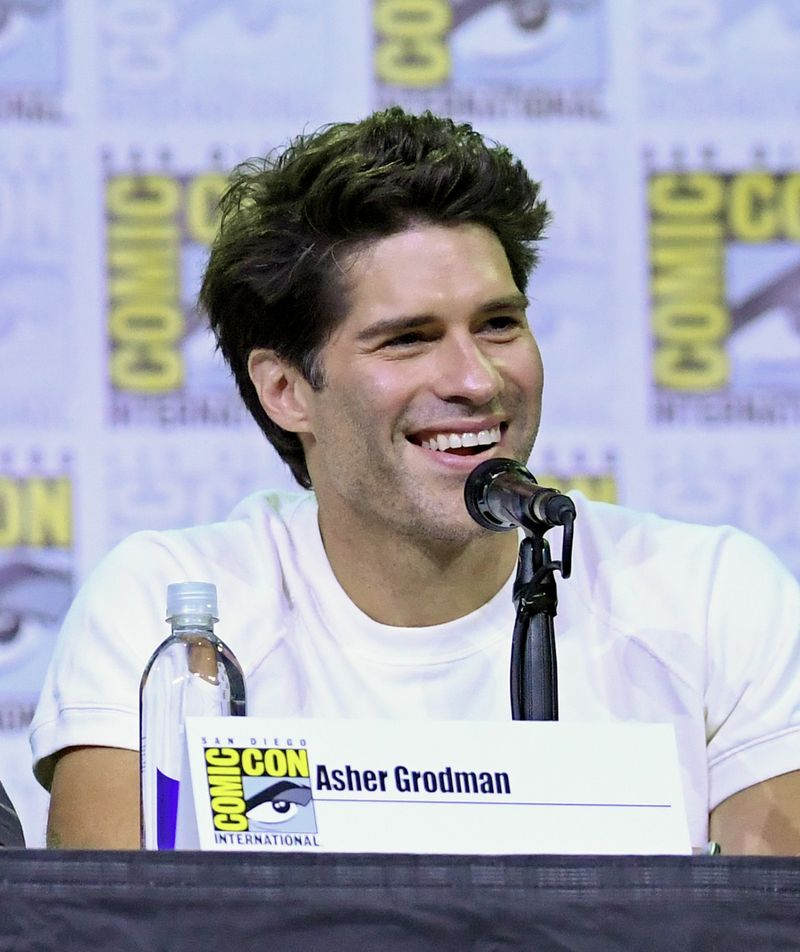
- Grodman in 2025
- Born: Asher Chazen Grodman; July 28, 1987 (age 38); New York City, U.S.
- Education: Columbia University (BA); American Conservatory Theater (MFA)
- Occupations: Actor, producer
- Years active: 2004–present

Asher Chazen Grodman (born July 28, 1987) is an American actor, writer, director and producer. He is best known for his performance as Trevor Lefkowitz on the hit comedy Ghosts for which he earned two Critics Choice Awards nominations for Best Supporting Actor in a Comedy. As a filmmaker, writer, and director, he has won awards from the Tribeca Festival and Cannes Lions.

== Early life and education ==
Grodman was born in New York City and raised in a rural part of New Jersey. His father, Marc Grodman, a professor at the Columbia University Vagelos College of Physicians and Surgeons, is the founder of BioReference Labs, a biotech company and led several biotech companies including GeneDx and Genosity. Raised in Califon, New Jersey as "the one Jew in a very, very not Jewish community", Grodman attended Far Hills Country Day School and Newark Academy. He graduated from Columbia University in 2010 with a degree in film and English. While at Newark Academy, he was selected to the NJ All-State fencing team and was a member of the varsity at Columbia University. Grodman also holds an MFA from the American Conservatory Theater in San Francisco.

== Career ==
In 2023 Grodman wrote, directed, produced and starred in It Was Written: the Jacksonville Jaguars Schedule Release video which was a mockumentary about the NFL being scripted. The film won him awards from the Tribeca Film Festival, Cannes Lions, and the Webby Awards.

He stars in the hit CBS series Ghosts, where he plays the character of Trevor Lefkowitz, a deceased Wall Street stockbroker and party boy from the 1990s who spends eternity in a suit with no pants. Asher’s performance earned him a 2025 and 2026 Critics Choice Awards Nomination for Best Supporting Actor in a Comedy.

Grodman wrote, directed, and produced The Train, a short film starring Emmy Award-winning actor Eli Wallach. The film is based on the true story of a Holocaust survivor and won awards at the Cleveland International Film Festival, Sedona International Film Festival and Rhode Island International Film Festival. It premiered internationally at the Vancouver International Film Festival.

He worked in theater for years appearing in shows at the American Conservatory Theater, Baltimore Center Stage, Daryl Roth 2 Theater in New York and notably played the title role in ‘Amedus’ at South Coast Rep. He has also appeared on Bookie on HBO, Chicago Med, House of Cards, Succession, Law and Order: SVU and numerous independent films.

Grodman worked as a substitute elementary school teacher in South Central LA before teaching acting at Hunter College. He also taught acting to inmates in Rikers Island.

== Personal life ==
Since 1995, Grodman has been a fan of the Jacksonville Jaguars. He's a mainstay at their games. Grodman is Jewish.

== Filmography ==
=== Film ===
| Year | Title | Role | Notes |
|---|---|---|---|
| 2004 | Girls in Bathing Suits | Unknown | Short film |
| 2005 | The Visionary* – (*Tesla) | Tesla's Inner Child | Short film |
| 2006 | Mo | Brett | |
| 2007 | Knock Knock | Young Dead Marcus | |
| 2008 | Handsome Harry | Bobby Sweeney | Best Ensemble Cast - Boston Film Festival |
| 2012 | BuzzKill | Receptionist | |
| 2012 | I Miss You | Gabe | Short film |
| 2013 | The Lovemakers | Sam | Short film |
| 2014 | Pacifica | Alex | Short film |
| 2015 | The Train | Adam | Short film, director, producer, writer. Winner. |
| 2017 | Rekindled | Shane | Short film |
| 2019 | For Sale: Baby Shoes, Never Worn | Husband | Short film |
| 2019 | Inez & Doug & Kira | George Jr. | |
| 2020 | Maxed | Man in Woods | Short film |
| 2023 | It Was Written: Jacksonville Jaguars Schedule Release | Head Writer | Short film, writer, director, producer |
| 2024 | Looking Through Water | Randall | |
| 2025 | Out of Order | Pat | |
| 2026 | Stop to Stop | Director | Short film, director, producer |

=== Television ===
| Year | Title | Role | Notes |
|---|---|---|---|
| 2009 | Law & Order | Nate | Episode: "Skate or Die" |
| 2018 | Elementary | Gary | Episode: "Fit to be Tied" |
| 2018 | House of Cards | Aide | Episode: "Chapter 73" |
| 2019 | Chicago Med | Brandon Wycoff | Episode: "More Harm Than Good" |
| 2019 | Succession | Sam | Episode: "Hunting" |
| 2019 | Law & Order: Special Victims Unit | Rick Olin | Episode: "Counselor, It's Chinatown" |
| 2021–present | Ghosts | Trevor "T-Money" Lefkowitz | Leading Role |
| 2025 | Bookie | Shelly | Episode: “Spooning Is Not Necrophilia”, “Sphinter Money” |

=== Web ===
| Year | Title | Role | Notes |
|---|---|---|---|
| 2023 | It Was Written (2023 Schedule Release, Jacksonville Jaguars) | Himself | Also writer and co-director |
