= Critics' Choice Television Award for Best Supporting Actor in a Comedy Series =

Annual television award

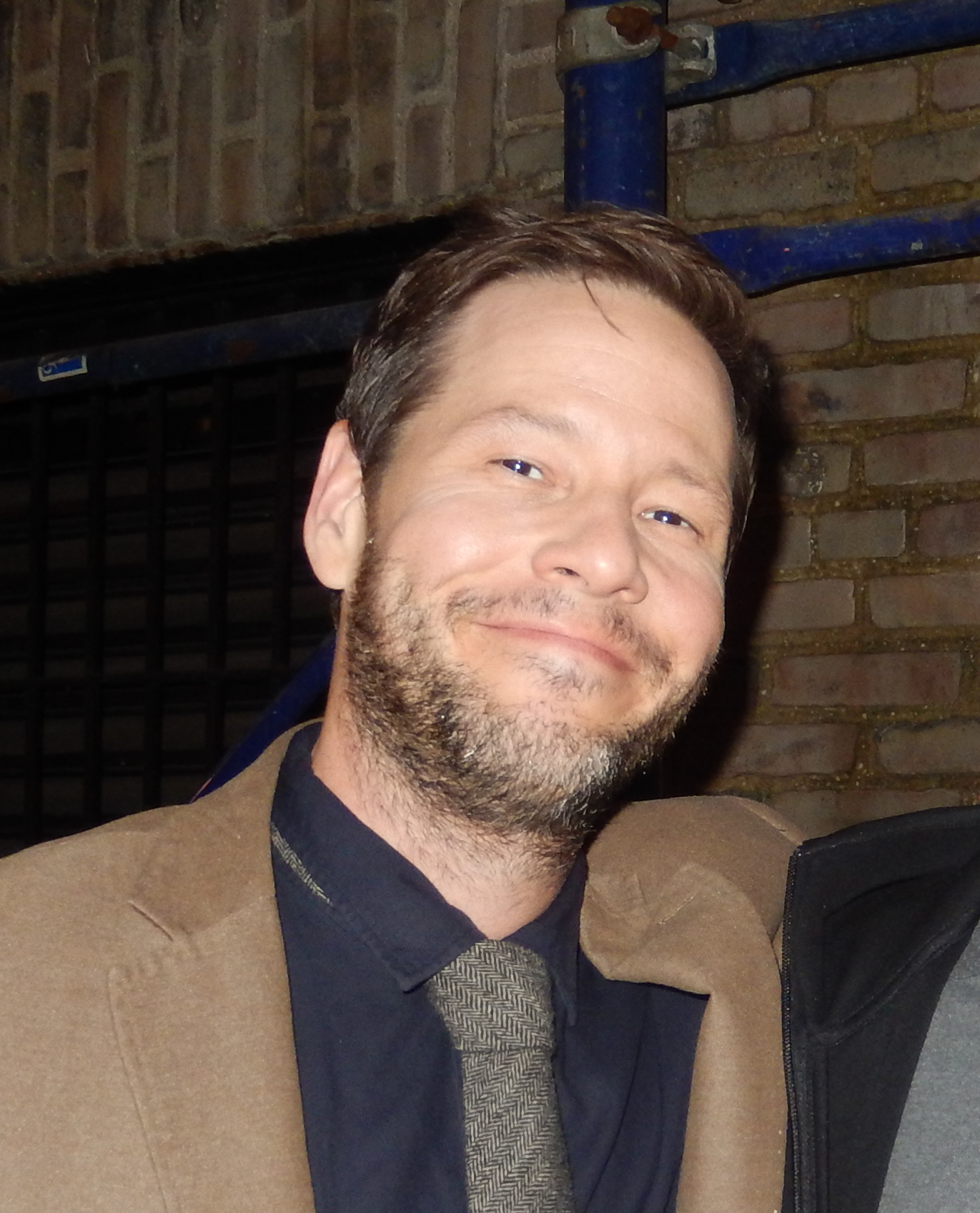
- The 2025 recipient: Ike Barinholtz
- Country: United States
- Presented by: Critics Choice Association
- First award: 2011
- Currently held by: Ike Barinholtz – The Studio (2025)
- Website: criticschoice.com

The Critics' Choice Television Award for Best Supporting Actor in a Comedy Series is one of the award categories presented annually by the Critics' Choice Television Awards (BTJA) to recognize the work done by television actors.

The award was introduced in 2011, when the event was first initiated. The winners are selected by a group of television critics that are part of the Broadcast Television Critics Association.

Both Andre Braugher and Henry Winkler hold the record with most wins with two each.

== Winners and nominees ==
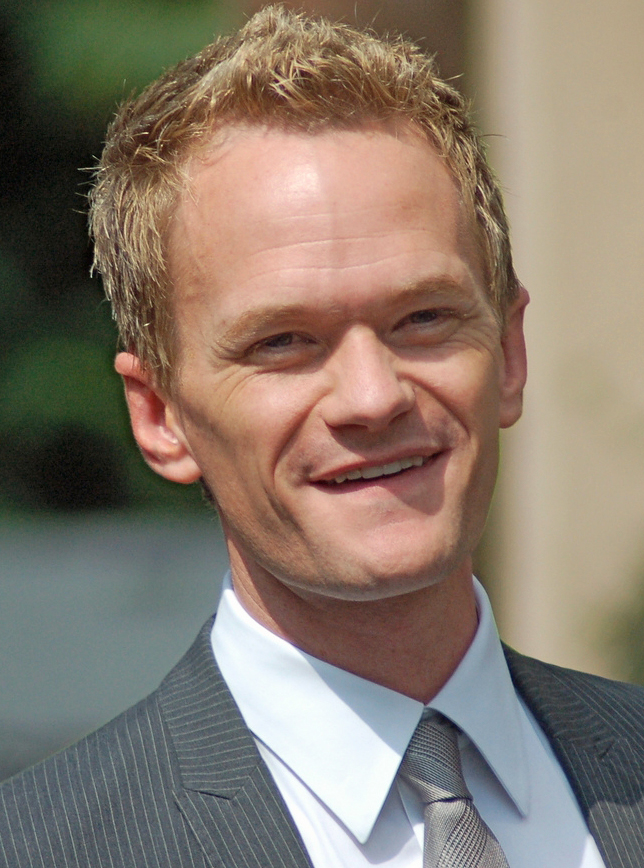
Neil Patrick Harris won for How I Met Your Mother (2011)

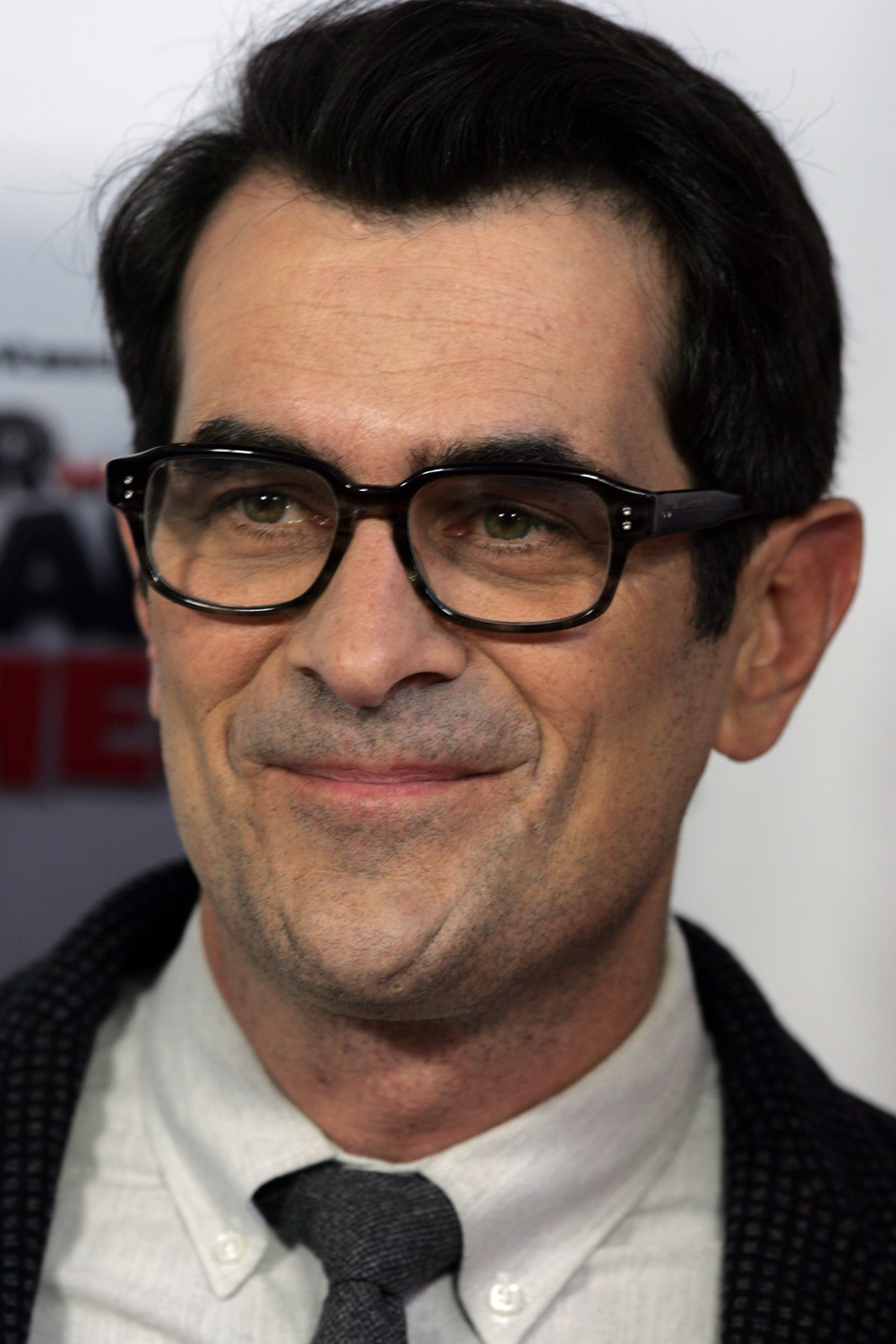
Ty Burrell won for Modern Family (2012)

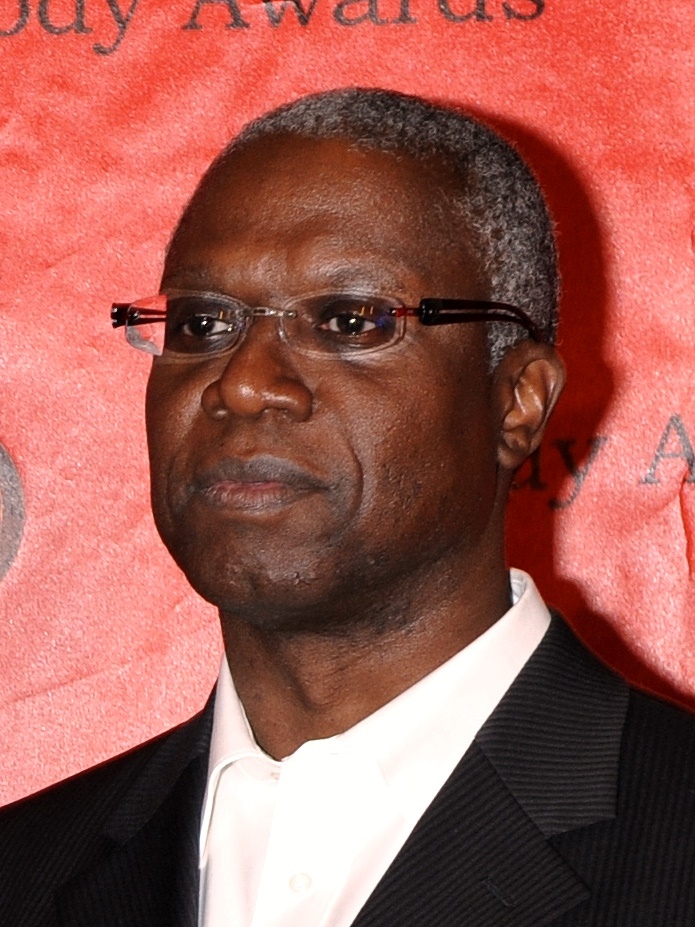
Andre Braugher won twice for Brooklyn Nine-Nine (2014-16)

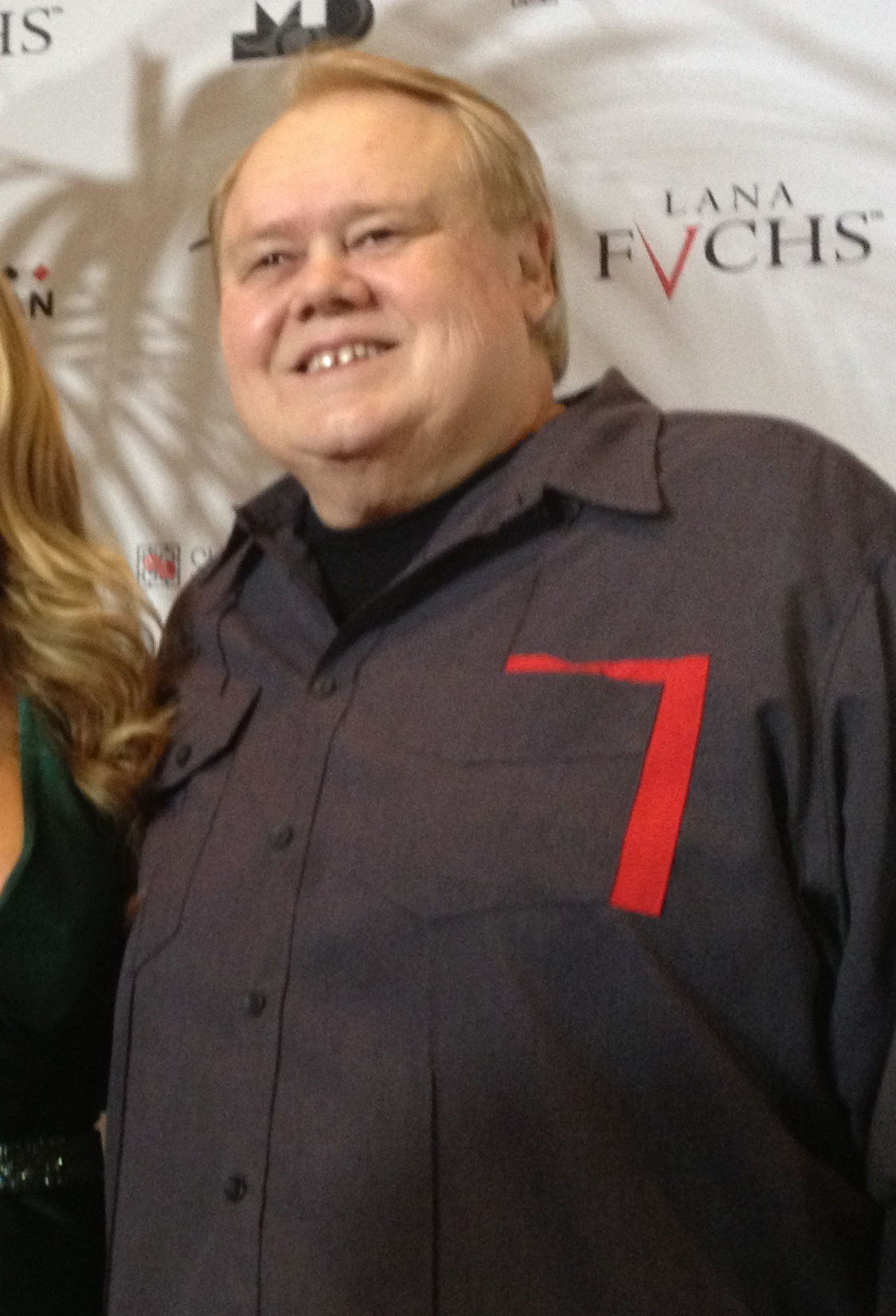
Louie Anderson won for Baskets (2016)

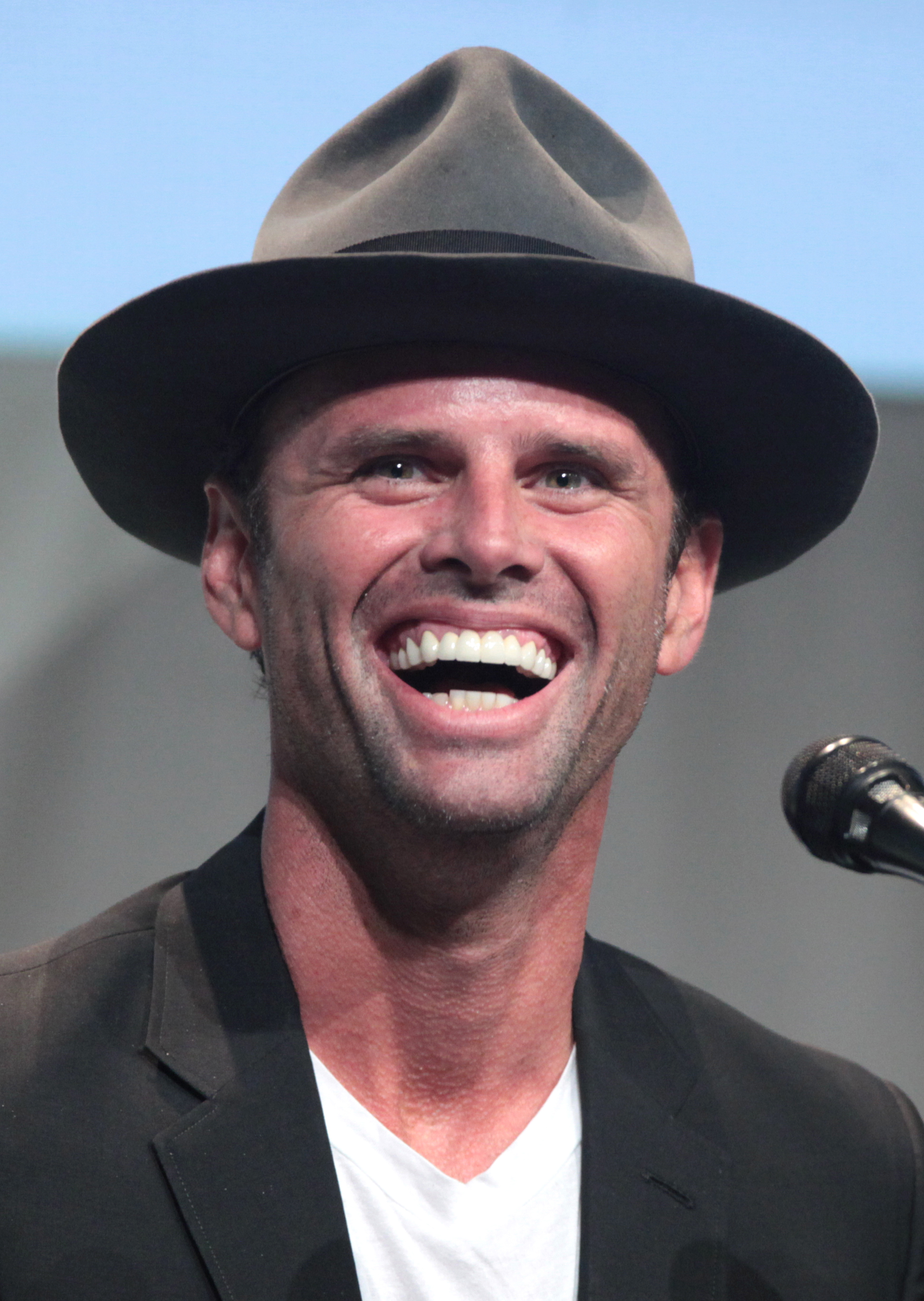
Walton Goggins won for Vice Principals (2018)

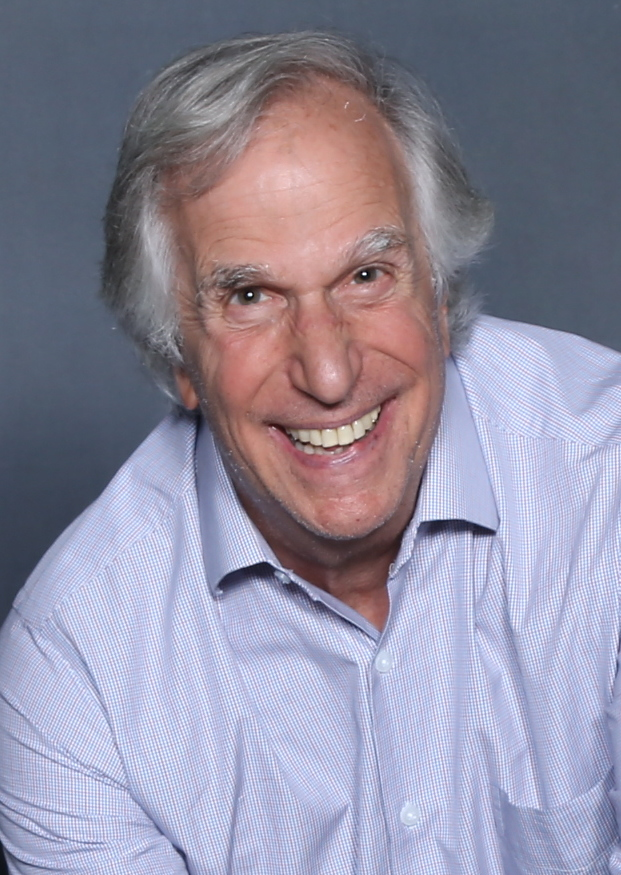
Henry Winkler won twice for Barry (2019, 2023)

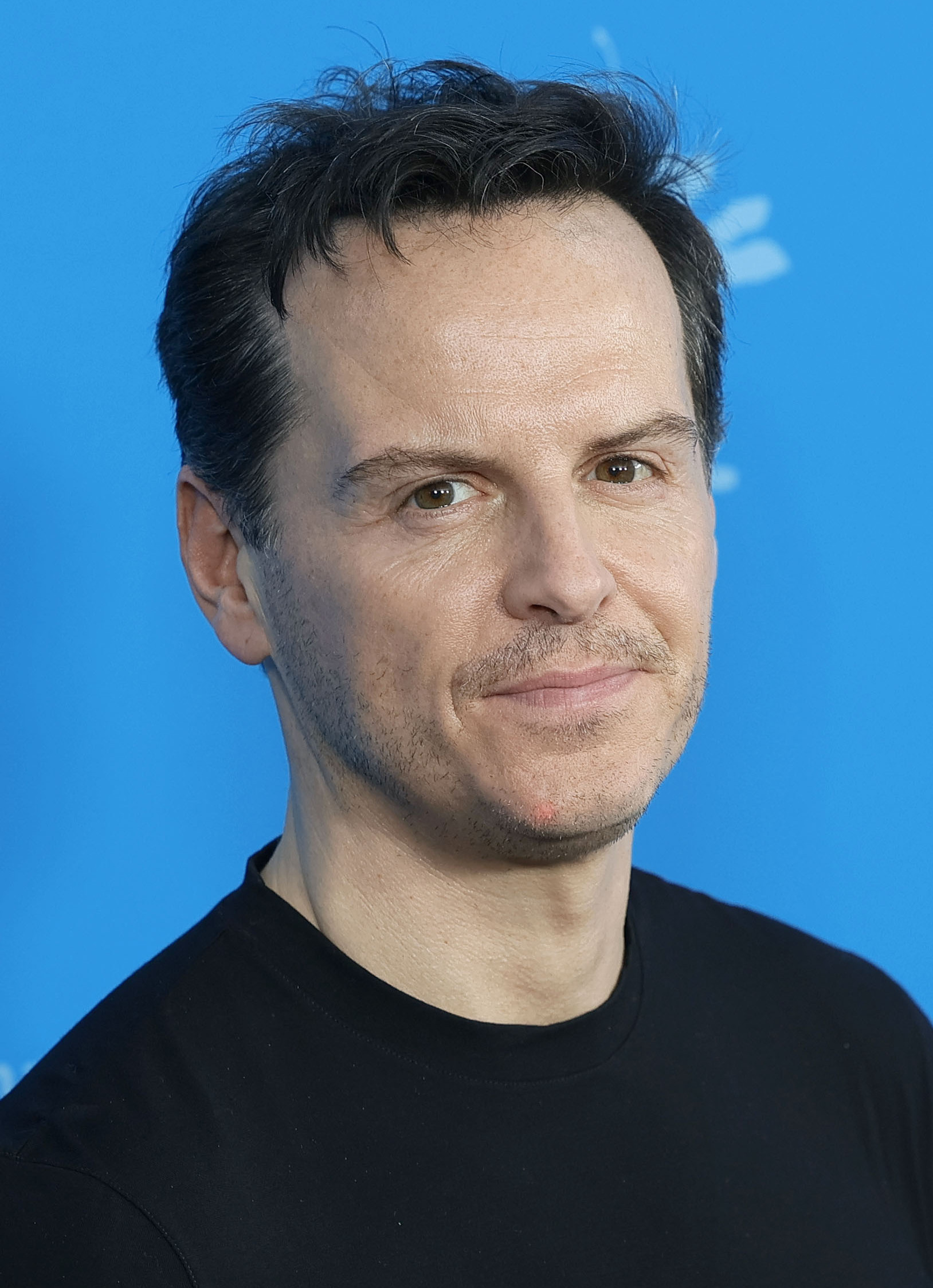
Andrew Scott won for Fleabag (2020)

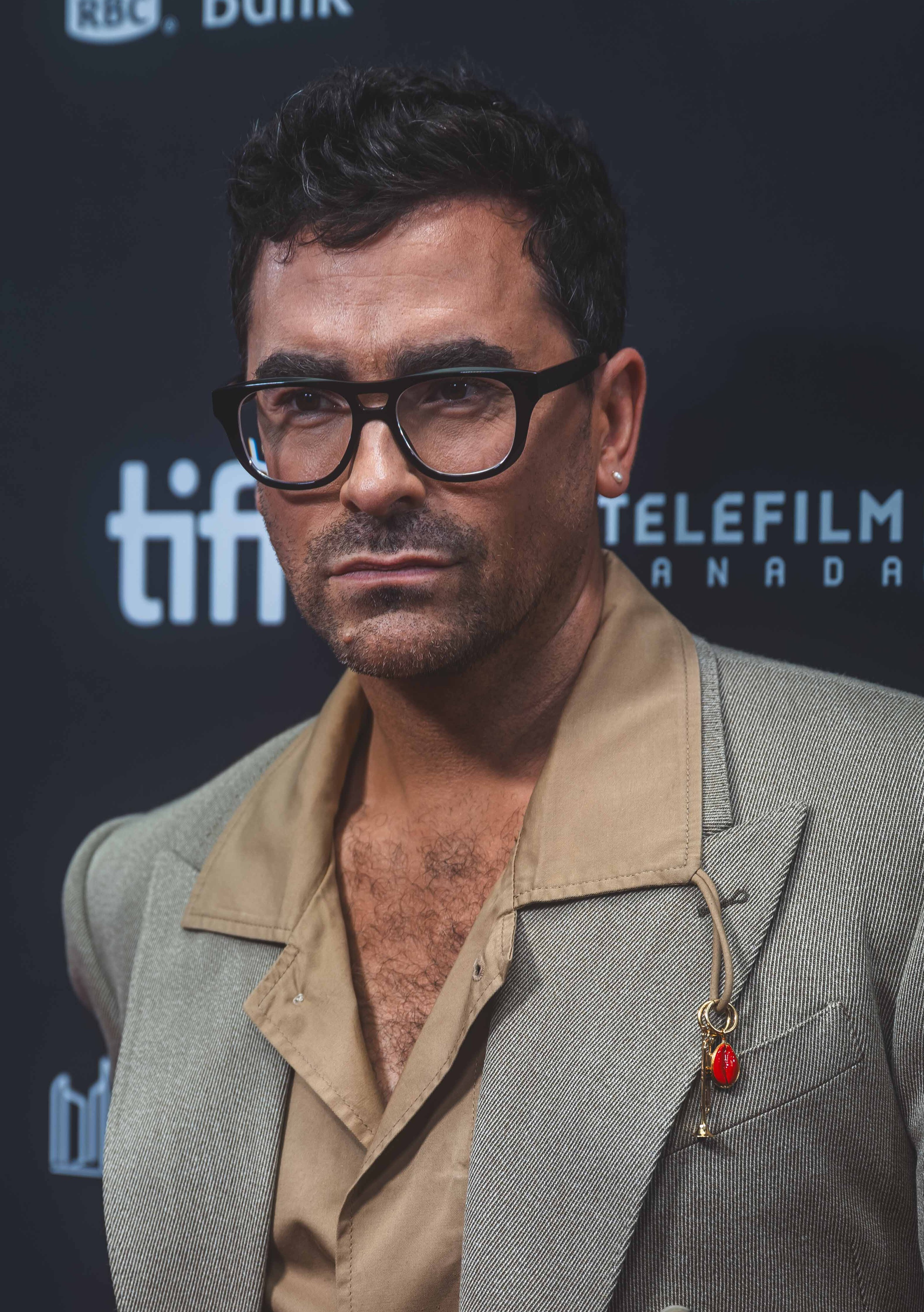
Dan Levy won for Schitt's Creek (2021)

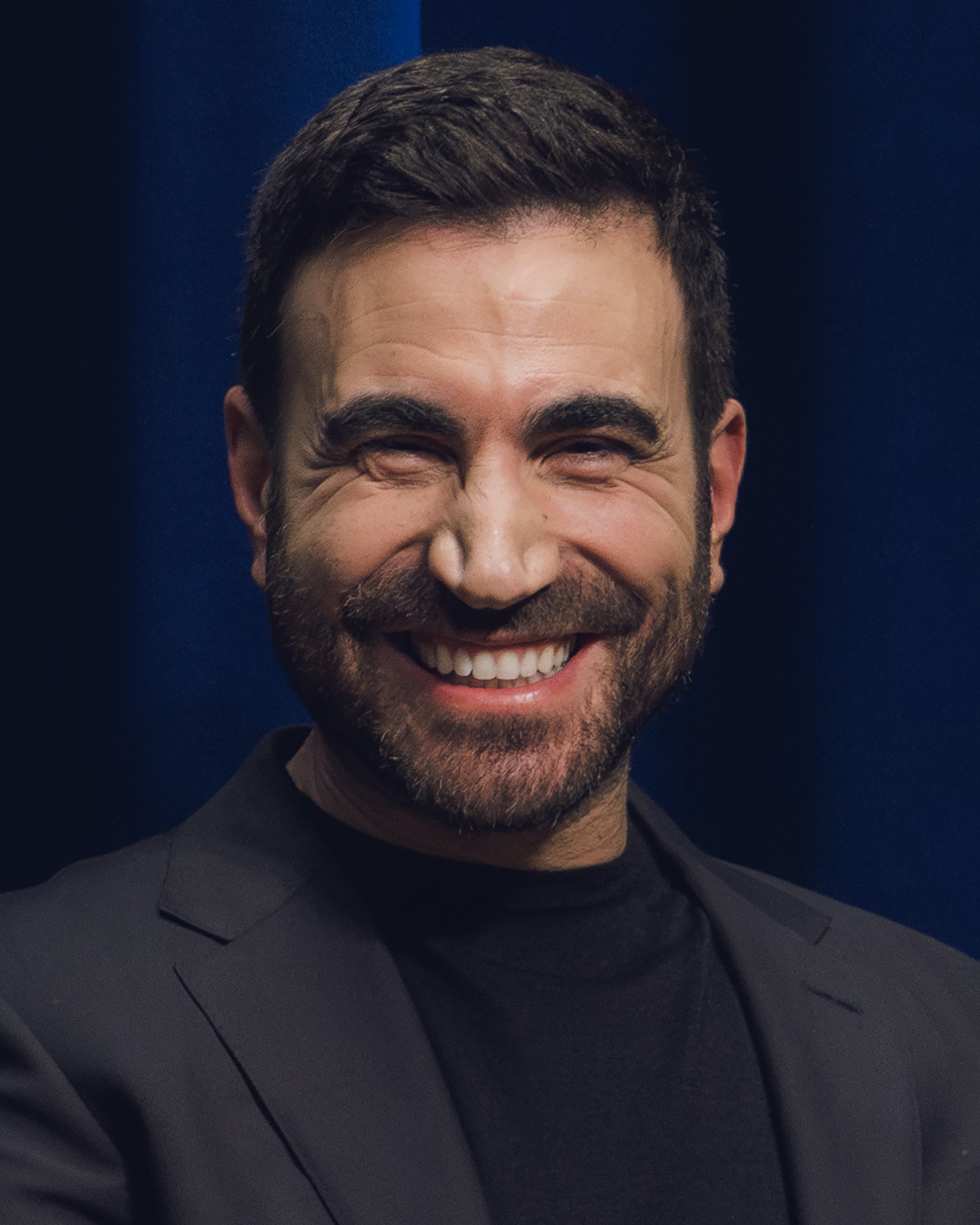
Brett Goldstein won for Ted Lasso (2022)

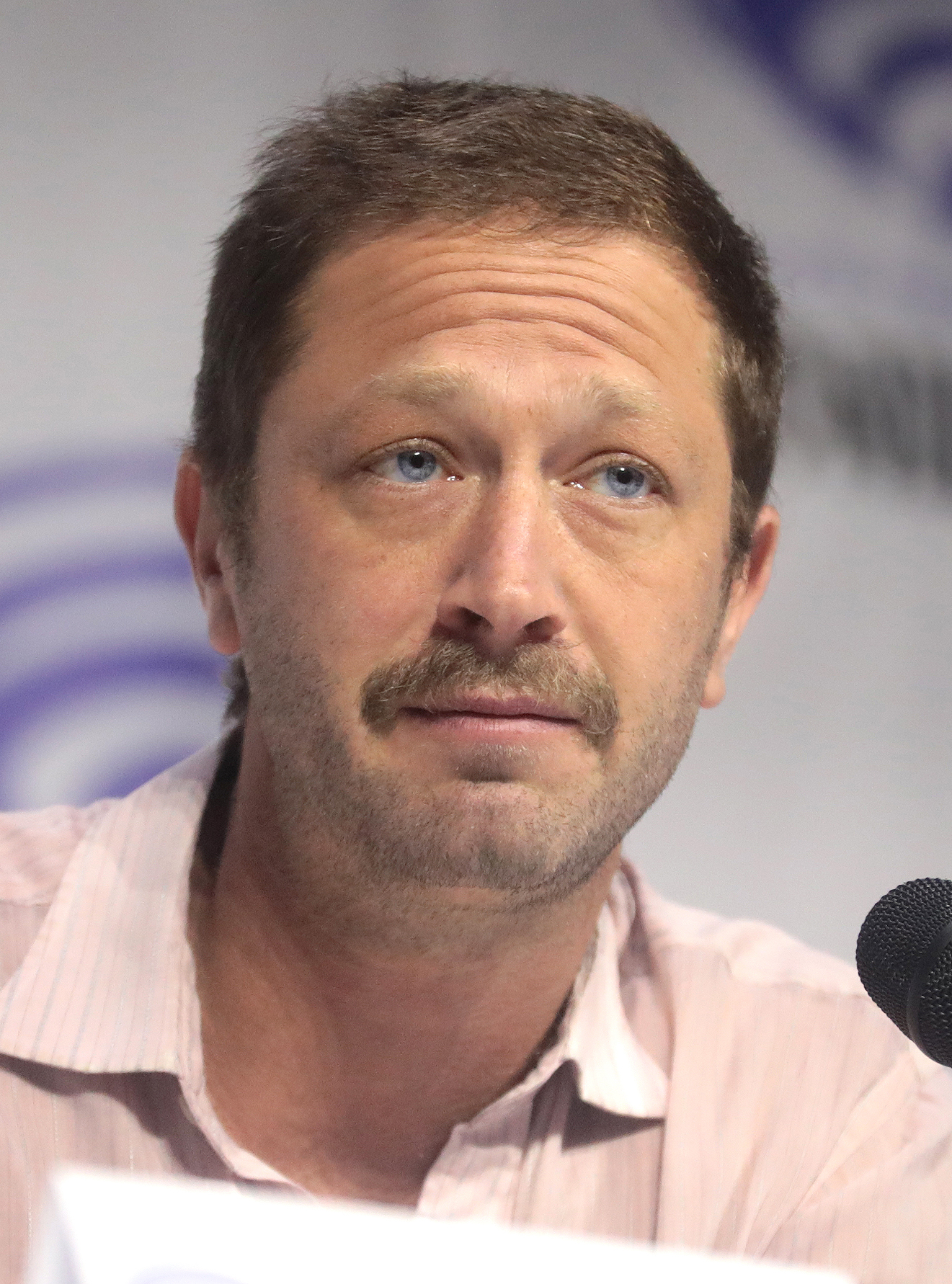
Ebon Moss-Bachrach won for The Bear (2024)

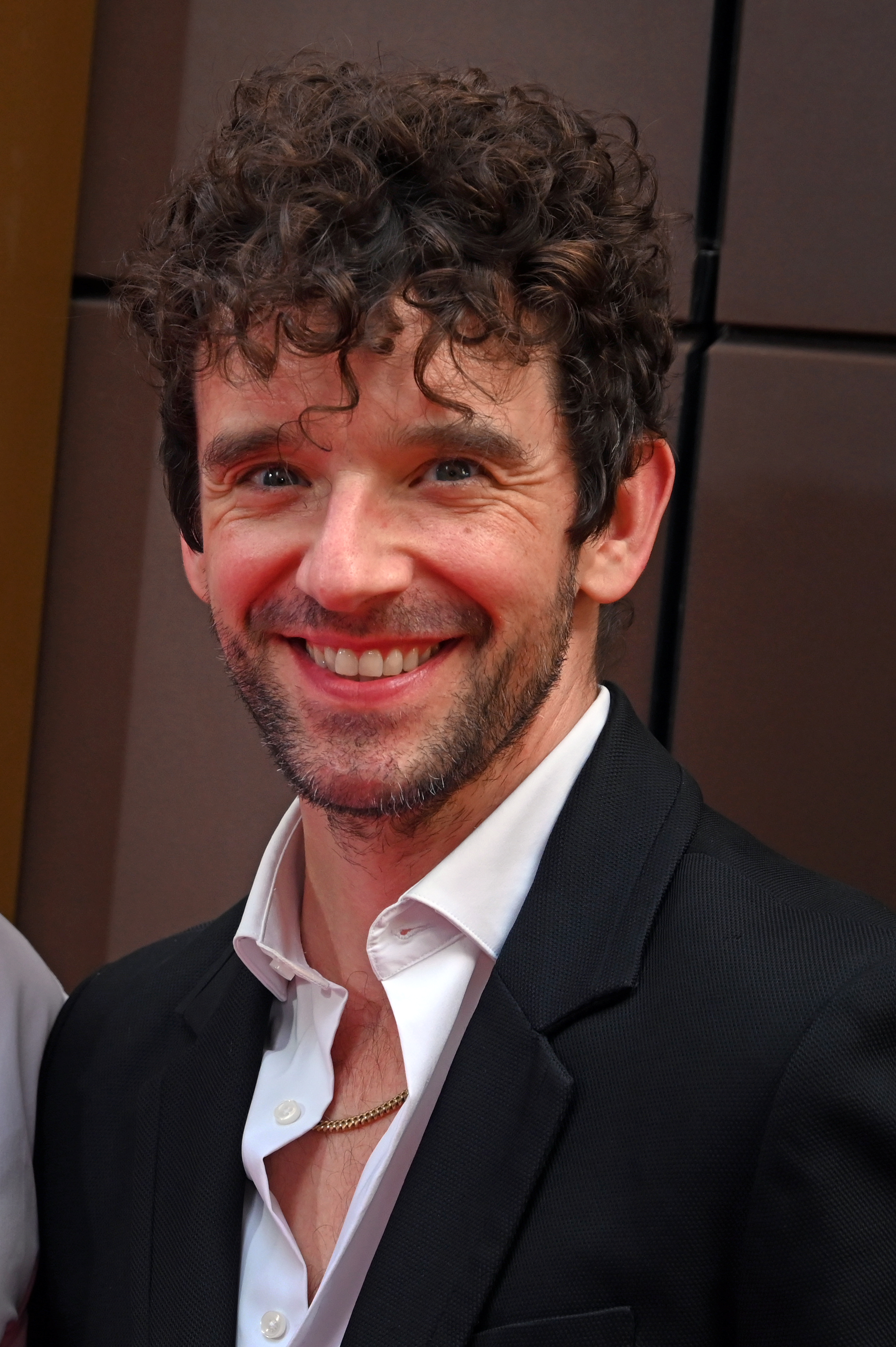
Michael Urie won for Shrinking (2025)

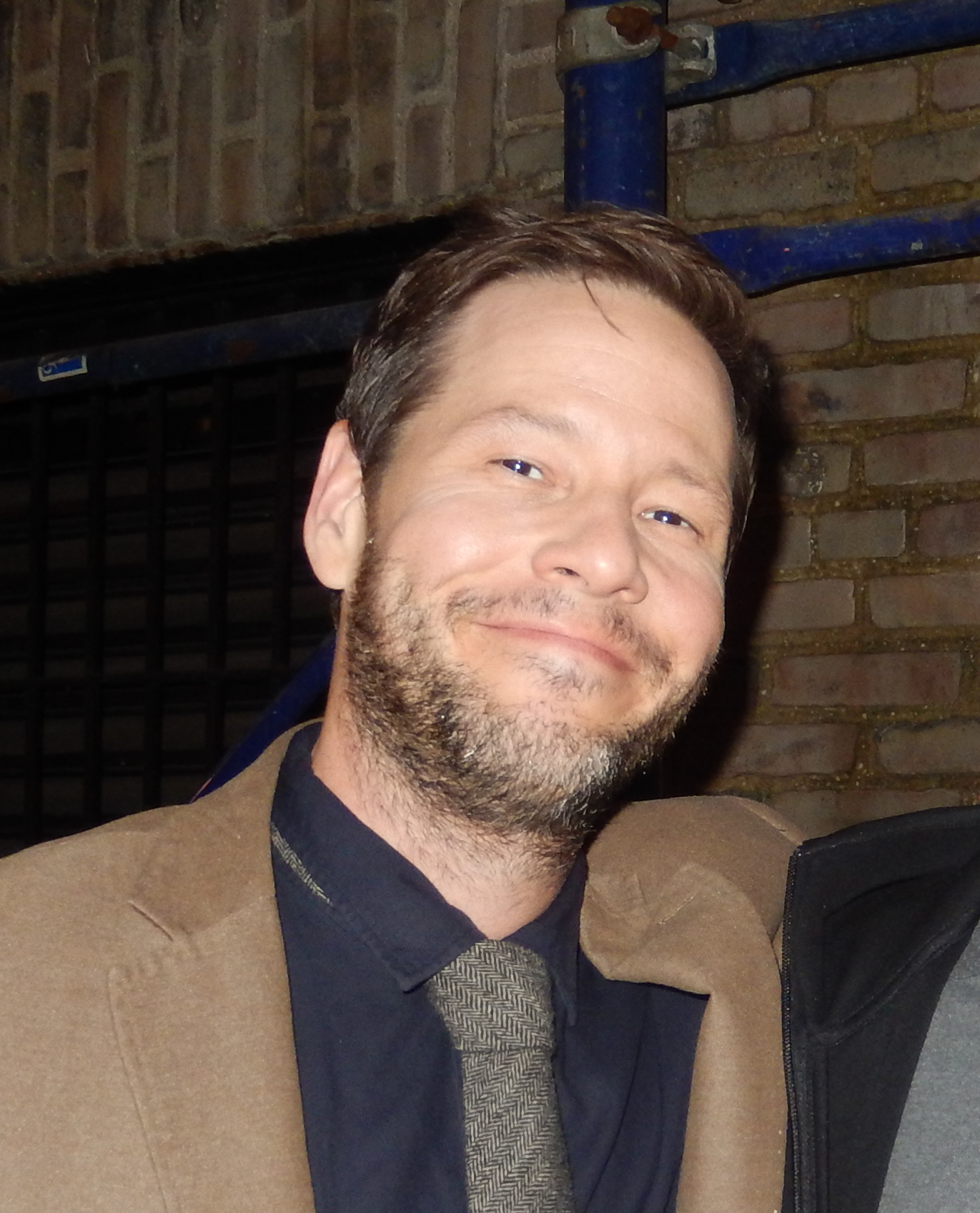
Ike Barinholtz won for The Studio (2026)

=== 2010s ===
Year	Actor	Role	Program	Network
2011	Neil Patrick Harris	How I Met Your Mother	Barney Stinson	CBS
2011	Ty Burrell	Modern Family	Phil Dunphy	ABC
2011	Ed O'Neill	Modern Family	Jay Pritchett	ABC
2011	Nick Offerman	Parks and Recreation	Ron Swanson	NBC
2011	Danny Pudi	Community	Abed Nadir	NBC
2011	Eric Stonestreet	Modern Family	Cameron Tucker	ABC
2012	Ty Burrell	Modern Family	Phil Dunphy	ABC
2012	Max Greenfield	New Girl	Schmidt	Fox
2012	Nick Offerman	Parks and Recreation	Ron Swanson	NBC
2012	Danny Pudi	Community	Abed Nadir	NBC
2012	Jim Rash	Community	Dean Craig Pelton	NBC
2012	Damon Wayans Jr.	Happy Endings	Brad Williams	ABC
2013	Simon Helberg	The Big Bang Theory	Howard Wolowitz	CBS
2013	Max Greenfield	New Girl	Schmidt	Fox
2013	Alex Karpovsky	Girls	Ray Ploshansky	HBO
2013	Adam Pally	Happy Endings	Max Blum	ABC
2013	Chris Pratt	Parks and Recreation	Andy Dwyer	NBC
2013	Danny Pudi	Community	Abed Nadir	NBC
2014	Andre Braugher	Brooklyn Nine-Nine	Captain Ray Holt	Fox
2014	Keith David	Enlisted	Command Sergeant Major Donald Cody	Fox
2014	Tony Hale	Veep	Gary Walsh	HBO
2014	Albert Tsai	Trophy Wife	Bert Harrison	ABC
2014	Christopher Evan Welch	Silicon Valley	Peter Gregory	HBO
2014	Jeremy Allen White	Shameless	Philip "Lip" Gallagher	Showtime
2015	T.J. Miller	Silicon Valley	Erlich Bachman	HBO
2015	Tituss Burgess	Unbreakable Kimmy Schmidt	Titus Andromedon	Netflix
2015	Jaime Camil	Jane the Virgin	Rogelio de la Vega	The CW
2015	Adam Driver	Girls	Adam Sackler	HBO
2015	Tony Hale	Veep	Gary Walsh	HBO
2015	Cameron Monaghan	Shameless	Ian Gallagher	Showtime
2016 (1)	Andre Braugher	Brooklyn Nine-Nine	Captain Ray Holt	Fox
2016 (1)	Jaime Camil	Jane the Virgin	Rogelio de la Vega	The CW
2016 (1)	Jay Duplass	Transparent	Josh Pfefferman	Amazon Prime Video
2016 (1)	Neil Flynn	The Middle	Mike Heck, Jr.	ABC
2016 (1)	Keegan-Michael Key	Playing House	Mark Rodriguez	USA Network
2016 (1)	Mel Rodriguez	Getting On	Patsy De La Serda	HBO
2016 (2)	Louie Anderson	Baskets	Christine Baskets	FX
2016 (2)	Andre Braugher	Brooklyn Nine-Nine	Captain Ray Holt	Fox
2016 (2)	Tituss Burgess	Unbreakable Kimmy Schmidt	Titus Andromedon	Netflix
2016 (2)	Ty Burrell	Modern Family	Phil Dunphy	ABC
2016 (2)	Tony Hale	Veep	Gary Walsh	HBO
2016 (2)	T.J. Miller	Silicon Valley	Erlich Bachman	HBO
2018	Walton Goggins	Vice Principals	Lee Russell	HBO
2018	Tituss Burgess	Unbreakable Kimmy Schmidt	Titus Andromedon	Netflix
2018	Sean Hayes	Will & Grace	Jack McFarland	NBC
2018	Marc Maron	GLOW	Sam Sylvia	Netflix
2018	Kumail Nanjiani	Silicon Valley	Dinesh Chugtai	HBO
2018	Ed O'Neill	Modern Family	Jay Pritchett	ABC
2019	Henry Winkler	Barry	Gene Cousineau	HBO
2019	William Jackson Harper	The Good Place	Chidi Anagonye	NBC
2019	Sean Hayes	Will & Grace	Jack McFarland	NBC
2019	Brian Tyree Henry	Atlanta	Alfred "Paper Boi" Miles	FX
2019	Nico Santos	Superstore	Mateo Fernando Aquino Liwanag	NBC
2019	Tony Shalhoub	The Marvelous Mrs. Maisel	Abraham "Abe" Weissman	Amazon Prime Video

=== 2020s ===
Year	Actor	Role	Program	Network
2020	Andrew Scott	Fleabag	Priest	Amazon Prime Video
2020	Andre Braugher	Brooklyn Nine-Nine	Captain Ray Holt	NBC
2020	Anthony Carrigan	Barry	NoHo Hank	HBO
2020	William Jackson Harper	The Good Place	Chidi Anagonye	NBC
2020	Dan Levy	Schitt's Creek	David Rose	Pop
2020	Nico Santos	Superstore	Mateo Fernando Aquino Liwanag	NBC
2020	Henry Winkler	Barry	Gene Cousineau	HBO
2021	Dan Levy	Schitt's Creek	David Rose	Pop
2021	William Fichtner	Mom	Adam Janikowski	CBS
2021	Harvey Guillén	What We Do in the Shadows	Guillermo De la Cruz	FX
2021	Alex Newell	Zoey's Extraordinary Playlist	Mo	NBC
2021	Mark Proksch	What We Do in the Shadows	Colin Robinson	FX
2021	Andrew Rannells	Black Monday	Blair Pfaff	Showtime
2022	Brett Goldstein	Ted Lasso	Roy Kent	Apple TV+
2022	Ncuti Gatwa	Sex Education	Eric Effiong	Netflix
2022	Harvey Guillén	What We Do in the Shadows	Guillermo De la Cruz	FX
2022	Brandon Scott Jones	Ghosts	Captain Isaac Higgintoot	CBS
2022	Ray Romano	Made for Love	Herbert Green	HBO Max
2022	Bowen Yang	Saturday Night Live	Various Characters	NBC
2023	Henry Winkler	Barry	Gene Cousineau	HBO
2023	Brandon Scott Jones	Ghosts	Captain Isaac Higgintoot	CBS
2023	Leslie Jordan	Call Me Kat	Phil	Fox
2023	James Marsden	Dead to Me	Steve & Ben Wood	Netflix
2023	Chris Perfetti	Abbott Elementary	Jacob Hill	ABC
2023	Tyler James Williams	Abbott Elementary	Gregory Eddie	ABC
2024	Ebon Moss-Bachrach	The Bear	Richard "Richie" Jerimovich	FX
2024	Phil Dunster	Ted Lasso	Jamie Tartt	Apple TV+
2024	Harrison Ford	Shrinking	Dr. Paul Rhoades	Apple TV+
2024	Harvey Guillén	What We Do in the Shadows	Guillermo de la Cruz	FX
2024	James Marsden	Jury Duty	Himself	Amazon Freevee
2024	Henry Winkler	Barry	Gene Cousineau	HBO / Max
2025	Michael Urie	Shrinking	Brian	Apple TV+
2025	Paul W. Downs	Hacks	Jimmy LuSaque Jr.	HBO / Max
2025	Asher Grodman	Ghosts	Trevor Lefkowitz	CBS
2025	Harvey Guillén	What We Do in the Shadows	Guillermo de la Cruz	FX
2025	Brandon Scott Jones	Ghosts	Captain Isaac Higgintoot	CBS
2025	Tyler James Williams	Abbott Elementary	Gregory Eddie	ABC
2026
2026	Ike Barinholtz	The Studio	Sal Saperstein	Apple TV+
2026	Paul W. Downs	Hacks	Jimmy LuSaque Jr.	HBO / Max
2026	Asher Grodman	Ghosts	Trevor Lefkowitz	CBS
2026	Oscar Nunez	The Paper	Oscar Martinez	Peacock
2026	Chris Perfetti	Abbott Elementary	Jacob Hill	ABC
2026	Timothy Simons	Nobody Wants This	Sasha Roklov	Netflix

== Actor superlatives ==
=== Multiple wins ===
2 wins

- Andre Braugher
- Henry Winkler

=== Multiple nominations ===
4 nominations

- Andre Braugher
- Harvey Guillén
- Henry Winkler

3 nominations

- Tituss Burgess
- Ty Burrell
- Tony Hale
- Brandon Scott Jones
- Danny Pudi

2 nominations

- Jaime Camil
- Paul W. Downs
- Max Greenfield
- Asher Grodman
- William Jackson Harper
- Sean Hayes
- Dan Levy
- James Marsden
- T. J. Miller
- Ed O'Neill
- Nick Offerman
- Chris Perfetti
- Nico Santos
- Tyler James Williams

== Program superlatives ==
=== Multiple nominations ===
6 nominations

- Modern Family

5 nominations

- Barry
- Ghosts
- What We Do in the Shadows

4 nominations

- Abbott Elementary
- Brooklyn Nine-Nine
- Community
- Silicon Valley

3 nominations

- Parks and Recreation
- Unbreakable Kimmy Schmidt
- Veep

2 nominations

- Girls
- The Good Place
- Hacks
- Happy Endings
- Jane the Virgin
- New Girl
- Schitt's Creek
- Shameless
- Shrinking
- Superstore
- Ted Lasso
- Will & Grace

== See also ==
- TCA Award for Individual Achievement in Comedy
- Primetime Emmy Award for Outstanding Supporting Actor in a Comedy Series
- Golden Globe Award for Best Supporting Actor – Series, Miniseries or Television Film
