= Robert Chaplin =

Canadian artist and publisher (born 1968)

- Born: 17 January 1968 (age 58); Smithers, British Columbia, Canada
- Education: Fine Art at the University of Victoria
- Known for: artist, publisher

Robert Chaplin RCA (born 17 January 1968) is a Canadian artist and publisher, currently based in Vancouver. His practice includes carving gem stones, making sculptures, drawing and painting pictures, writing stories, and publishing books. He holds the Guinness World Record for publishing the world's smallest book.

== Career ==
Born in Smithers, British Columbia, Chaplin studied Fine Art at the University of Victoria, and was elected to the Royal Canadian Academy of Arts in 2004.

His obsidian carving representing the North Wind was awarded third place in the Objects of Art category of the 2002 AGTA Cutting Edge Awards.

In 2010, his book Brussels Sprouts & Unicorns was awarded first place in the Alcuin Society Awards for "excellence in book design in Canada". In 2006, his book Ten Counting Cat was awarded second place in the Alcuin Awards. Teeny Ted from Turnip Town (2007), created in association with nanoscientists at Simon Fraser University in Burnaby, and written by Malcolm Chaplin, is the world's smallest book, at 69 x 97 micrometres square. Chaplin's other books include Alien Alphabet (1994), The Matchbook-a fireside fable, Ten Counting Cat, The Elephant Book, Delicious Chicken Soup, and Brussels Sprouts & Unicorns.
