= Rafael Spregelburd =

Argentine playwright, director and actor

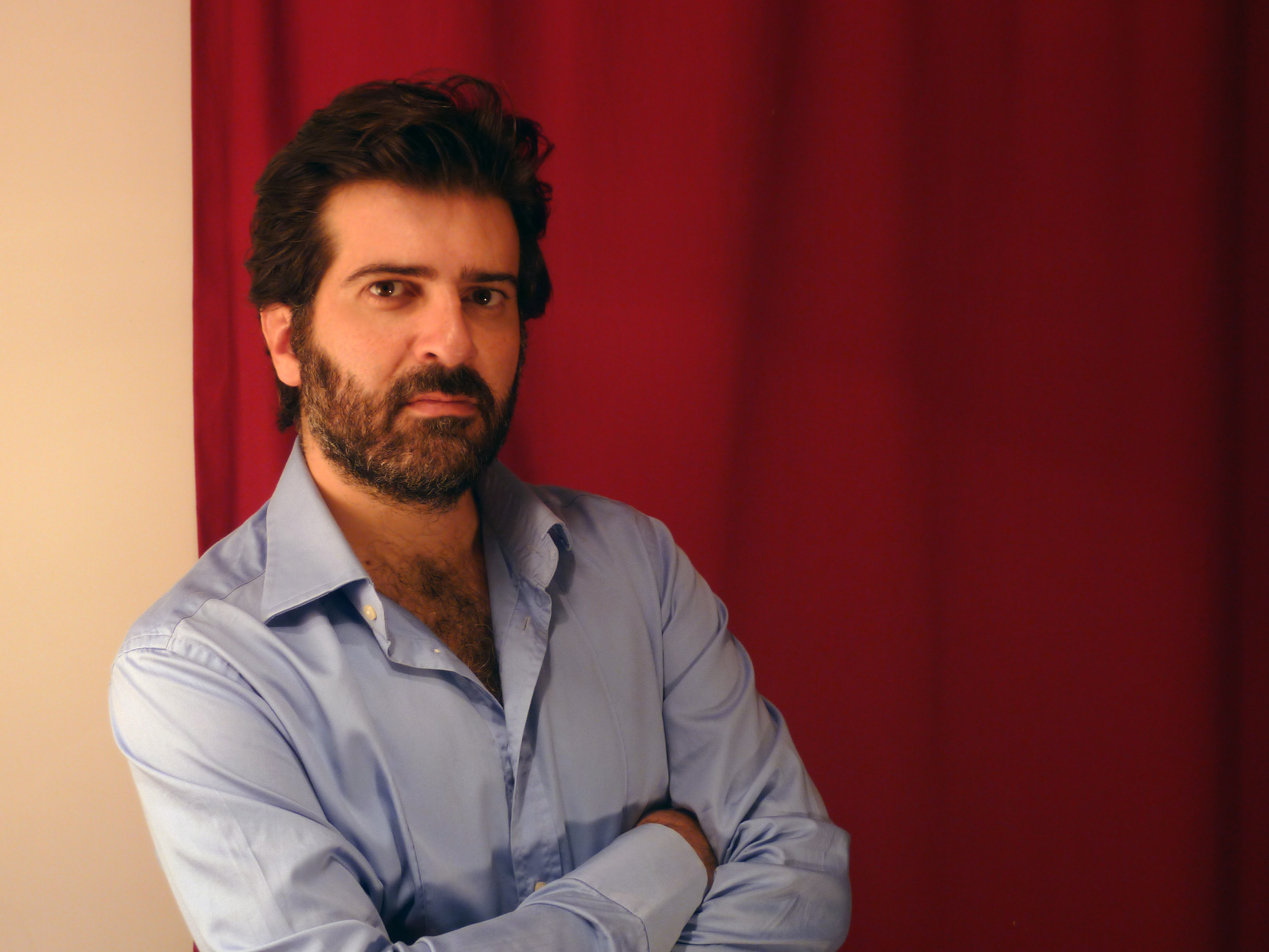
Rafael Spregelburd

Rafael Spregelburd (born 1970 in Buenos Aires) is an Argentine playwright, director and actor. He studied acting and drama at the University of Buenos Aires. From 1995 he started directing, mainly in theatre performances of his own works. He won a number of awards including the Tirso de Molina. His plays are critically acclaimed in Argentina and in some European countries.

== Selected works ==
- Spam (2014)
- Todo. Apátrida. Envidia. (2011)
- La paranoia (2008)
- Bizarra (2008)
- Lúcido (2006)

== Selected filmography ==
Film
Year	Title	Role	Notes
2022	Trenque Lauquen	Rafa	
2021	9	Óscar	
2018	Perdida	Oreyana	
2018	The Last Man	Gomez	
2016	Finding Sofia	Victor	
2015	Abzurdah	Eduardo	
2013	The Film Critic	Victor Tellez	
2009	The Man Next Door	Leonardo	
2008	Extraordinary Stories	Detective Delfín	
2008	Love by accident		
