= Out of Order (2025 American film) =

- Directed by: Guy Jacobson
- Written by: Guy Jacobson; Megan Freels Johnston
- Produced by: Isen Robbins; Aimee Schoof; B. Stephen Tedeschi; Chris Bongirne; Brandon Routh; Jesse Manning; Katy Donnelly
- Starring: Brandon Routh; Brooke Shields; Sam Huntington; Krysta Rodriguez; Luis Guzmán; Sandra Bernhard; Tao Okamoto; Michael Potts; Asher Grodman; Jasmine Tookes
- Cinematography: Matt Braunsdorf
- Edited by: Matt Braunsdorf; Eric Potter
- Music by: Various artists
- Production companies: Priority Films, Intrinsic Value Films, Island View Productions, Business Lunch Productions, Smokestack Films
- Distributed by: TBD
- Release date: October 15, 2025 (Chelsea Film Festival)
- Country: United States
- Language: English

Out of Order is a 2025 comedy film directed by Guy Jacobson and written by Jacobson and Megan Freels Johnston. Inspired by classic comedies like Mrs. Doubtfire, His Girl Friday, My Cousin Vinny, and A Fish Called Wanda, the film stars Brandon Routh as John Slater, an ambitious but bumbling lawyer entangled in a legal mess involving dual identities, eccentric allies, and a pivotal courtroom case. The film was produced by Priority Films, Intrinsic Value Films, Island View Productions, Business Lunch Productions, and Smokestack Films.

The film premiered at select international film festivals in New York City in fall 2025, with additional screenings scheduled throughout late 2025 and early 2026.

== Plot ==
Out of Order follows John Slater, a well-meaning but hapless lawyer juggling two jobs, two identities, and one outlandish case. As he tries to keep his professional and personal lives from collapsing, John faces a strict judge, a high-stakes lawsuit, and romantic chaos. With fast-paced humor and emotional depth, the film delivers a modern twist on the classic legal farce.

== Cast ==
- Brandon Routh as John / Jack – an eccentric and not-so-successful lawyer, and his alternate persona.
- Sam Huntington as Paul – John's sarcastic and cynical best friend and co-worker.
- Krysta Rodriguez as Sue – a charming and intelligent woman working with John to defend her case.
- Tao Okamoto as Lisa – John's girlfriend, assertive and unwilling to be taken for granted.
- Asher Grodman as Pat – CEO of pharmaceutical giant SuperGen, in court against Sue.
- Michael Potts as Jerry – John's boss and Sue’s uncle.
- Sandra Bernhard as Judge Stevenson – strict, stylish, and half-blind.
- Brooke Shields as Daniella – a powerful partner at “Jack’s” new law firm.
- Luis Guzmán as Gustav – an inmate imprisoned for biting people, who becomes John’s unexpected ally.

== Soundtrack ==
The film features an eclectic soundtrack including:

- "Hearts on the Run" - Delta Goodrem, Marla A. Altschuler, Matthew Charles Copley
- "How to Live" - Brian Healey, Kyle Peters, Neil Lucas, Will Roberts
- "Tornado" - Ryan Hunter, Imad Royal, David Lubben
- "Cave My Head Full of Dreams" - John N Wlaysewski
- "Night Mentality" - Gianna Alessi
- "Trap of Mirrors" - Brian Healey, Kyle Peters, Neil Lucas, Will Roberts
- "Hey Boy" - Maddy Walsh, Mike Suave
- "Poetry" - John N Wlaysewski
- "Anything You Want" - DeQuan Tunstull, Kiana Del
- "DYBIL" - John N Wlaysewski
- "Waiting on You" - Elizabeth Brown, Gabrielle Sterbenz
- "Back to Your Heart" - Delta Goodrem, John Shanks, Matthew Charles Copley
- "Bliss Seeker" - Maddy Walsh, Mike Suave

== Production ==
Filming took place over five weeks across Manhattan, Brooklyn, Queens, and Staten Island. Key courtroom scenes were shot at the Staten Island Targee Street Court House, with support from the New York City Department of Citywide Administrative Services (DCAS), which helped revitalize the space for production.

== Festivals and awards ==
- Chelsea Film Festival (NYC), October 15-19, 2025 - Opening Night Film& Audience Award Winner
- Universal Film Festival (Kansas City), September 27, 2025 Winner Best Comedy
- Sugarloaf Film Festival (Chester, NY), September 27, 2025 - Closing Night Film, Winner Best Feature
- Toronto Comedy Film Festival, September 30, 2025, Winner Best Director
- ICP Festival (New York), October 24, 2025 - Winner: Best Comedy, Winner Best Comedy
- Bondance Festival (Japan), October 25, 2025 - International Premiere, Winner Best Feature
- Portland Comedy Film Festival, Winter 2026
- Swedish International Film Fest - December 17
- Haha Harvest Festival (New Jersey) - November 2025
- Swedish International Film Festival - Winner Best Comedy
