= In Enemy Hands (film) =

2004 film by Tony Giglio

- Directed by: Tony Giglio
- Written by: Tony Giglio
- Produced by: Artisan Entertainment; Splendid Pictures
- Starring: William H. Macy; Til Schweiger; Thomas Kretschmann; Scott Caan; Lauren Holly; Jeremy Sisto; Ian Somerhalder
- Cinematography: Gerry Lively
- Edited by: Peter Mergus; Harvey Rosenstock
- Music by: Steven Bramson
- Distributed by: Artisan Entertainment; Lions Gate Entertainment
- Release date: 25 February 2004
- Running time: 94 minutes
- Country: United States
- Languages: English; German
- Box office: $64,236

In Enemy Hands is a 2004 American submarine film directed by Tony Giglio and starring William H. Macy, Til Schweiger, Thomas Kretschmann, Scott Caan and Lauren Holly. The film follows an American submarine crew getting captured by a German submarine crew and taken prisoner aboard their U-boat.

== Plot ==
The movie begins with contemporary film footage of World War II as narration explains the situation. Germany has produced hundreds of U-boats to control the Atlantic shipping lanes and in 1942 wolfpacks sank over a thousand Allied ships, making real the possibility of Germany permanently conquering all of Europe. In 1943, Roosevelt and Churchill declared that the war against U-boats was their main priority and that new technology and a United States fully committed to the war was turning the tide in favor of the Allies.

In June 1943, submarine commander Lieutenant-Commander Randall Sullivan (Caan) is departing on a war cruise. Admiral Kentz (Berkeley) claims Sullivan's COB Nathan Travers (Macy) is a good man and Sullivan could learn from him. Travers' wife Rachel (Holly) makes him promise to come home safe. Two months later, they are aboard USS Swordfish (a fictional submarine based on the real USS Swordfish in World War II) repeatedly staging general quarters drills. The XO of Swordfish, Teddy Goodman (Gregg), becomes increasingly sick and the doctor diagnoses a rash on his stomach as meningitis, an extremely contagious disease that can sometimes be fatal. Unknown to the crew, Sullivan has a rash on his arm.

The U-429, captained by Jonas Herdt (Schweiger), survives a depth charge attack by an American destroyer, then sinks the American. Herdt plays chess with his First Watch Officer Ludwig Cremer (Kretschmann) and receives word from home that his daughter was killed in the bombing of Hamburg. When U-821, sinks the British merchant vessel Achilles, Swordfish is sent to investigate. Radio operator Virgil Wright (Huntington) hears Glenn Miller music coming from U-821, and Sullivan attacks. U-821 evades two torpedoes and maneuvers to return fire. Goodman dies from his sickness and Travers takes his place. Swordfish fires a third torpedo and destroys U-821 but the confusion caused by Goodman's death during the battle allows the U-boat to locate Swordfish. A near miss torpedo hit damages Swordfish and kills most of the crew. Sullivan, Travers, Wright, engineers Abers (Sisto) and Ox (Gallagher), and torpedomen Miller (Somerhalder), Cooper (Giovinazzo), and Romano (Morgan) abandon ship after it is forced to surface, and these sole survivors are taken prisoner by U-429.

The prisoners are split into two groups: Travers, Ox, Cooper, and Miller in the bow and Sullivan, Wright, Abers, and Romano in the stern. Wright discovers Sullivan's rash which Abers recognizes as deadly meningitis. Days later, as U-429 attacks an American destroyer, the USS Logan, Travers and his group break free of their bonds and fire one of the U-boat's torpedoes off course. Alerted to the U-boat's presence by the exploding torpedo, Logan attacks U-429 with depth charges. Sullivan breaks free, but is killed fighting off a German guard. The meningitis spreads rapidly, killing two-thirds of the German crew and the American Romano. Travers hallucinates about Rachel reminding him of his promise to come home.

Herdt compels the Americans and Germans to reluctantly work together, planning to sail to the United States coast and surrender his men, and explains to Travers he rescued the Americans in defiance of standing orders that only enemy captains and COBs were to be made prisoner. He's grown tired of the war and killing and vows to do whatever is necessary to get them all home. Klause (Heger), the U-429's quartermaster, becomes disillusioned with Herdt's co-operation with the Americans and stages a mutiny with Lieutenant Bauer and the U-429's radio operator Christophe. In the struggle, Christophe sends a distress call to other U-boats, Klause attempts to detonate the last bow torpedo to blow up the boat, and Herdt is fatally stabbed. Travers retaliates by breaking Klause's neck with a hoist chain. With his dying breath, Herdt passes command of the boat to Cremer.

U-429 encounters Logan again but before making contact is attacked by U-1221, responding to the distress call. U-1221 fires several torpedoes at U-429, alerting Logan. U-429 evades the torpedoes and two German crew members try unsuccessfully to convince Cremer to fire back at the Germans, but when Abers and Travers finally persuade him, they realize they only have one torpedo. They maneuver the stern tube into position and fire, but the torpedo doesn't detonate. U-1221 fires another torpedo at U-429, causing no serious damage, and Logan destroys U-1221 with gunfire. When Travers contacts Logan, Captain Samuel Littleton (Ellis) orders Travers to take the Enigma. Travers lies that they're sinking and breaks contact, keeping his promise to Cremer to never let U-429 be captured. The crew floods the boat and are rescued by Logan.

Once ashore, Travers confronts Kentz about the Germans that saved their lives. Kentz says the Germans are still the enemy, but he'll do his best to have them taken care of. Travers and Rachel are reunited and visit Cremer in a POW compound, where Rachel thanks Cremer for saving her husband's life. Travers and Cremer talk about Herdt and their hope the war will be over soon.

== Cast ==
- William H. Macy as Chief of The Boat Nathan Travers
- Til Schweiger as Captain Jonas Herdt
- Scott Caan as Lieutenant-Commander Randall Sullivan
- Thomas Kretschmann as 1st Watch Officer Ludwig Cremer
- Lauren Holly as Rachel Travers
- Clark Gregg as Executive Officer Teddy Goodman
- Carmine Giovinazzo as Buck Cooper
- Sam Huntington as Virgil Wright
- Jeremy Sisto as Jason Abers
- Ian Somerhalder as Danny Miller
- Branden Morgan as Benny Romano
- Patrick Gallagher as "Ox"
- Chris Ellis as Captain Samuel Littleton
- Xander Berkeley as Admiral Kentz
- Rene Heger as Klause
- Connor Donne as Bauer
- Sven-Ole Thorsen as Hans
- A.J. Buckley as Medical Officer
- Gavin Hood as Achilles Captain

== Alternate titles ==
- When the film was shown on Albanian television, it was given a title that translates as Underwater Prison in English, and had similar titles in some other countries' TV schedules U-429: Underwater Prison in Armenia and in Russia.

== Continuity errors ==
The actual USS Swordfish was a Sargo-class submarine, while in the film, the boat was described as a Balao-class submarine, which was a much later model.
