= A Boy and His Atom =

Stop-motion short movie created on an atomic scale

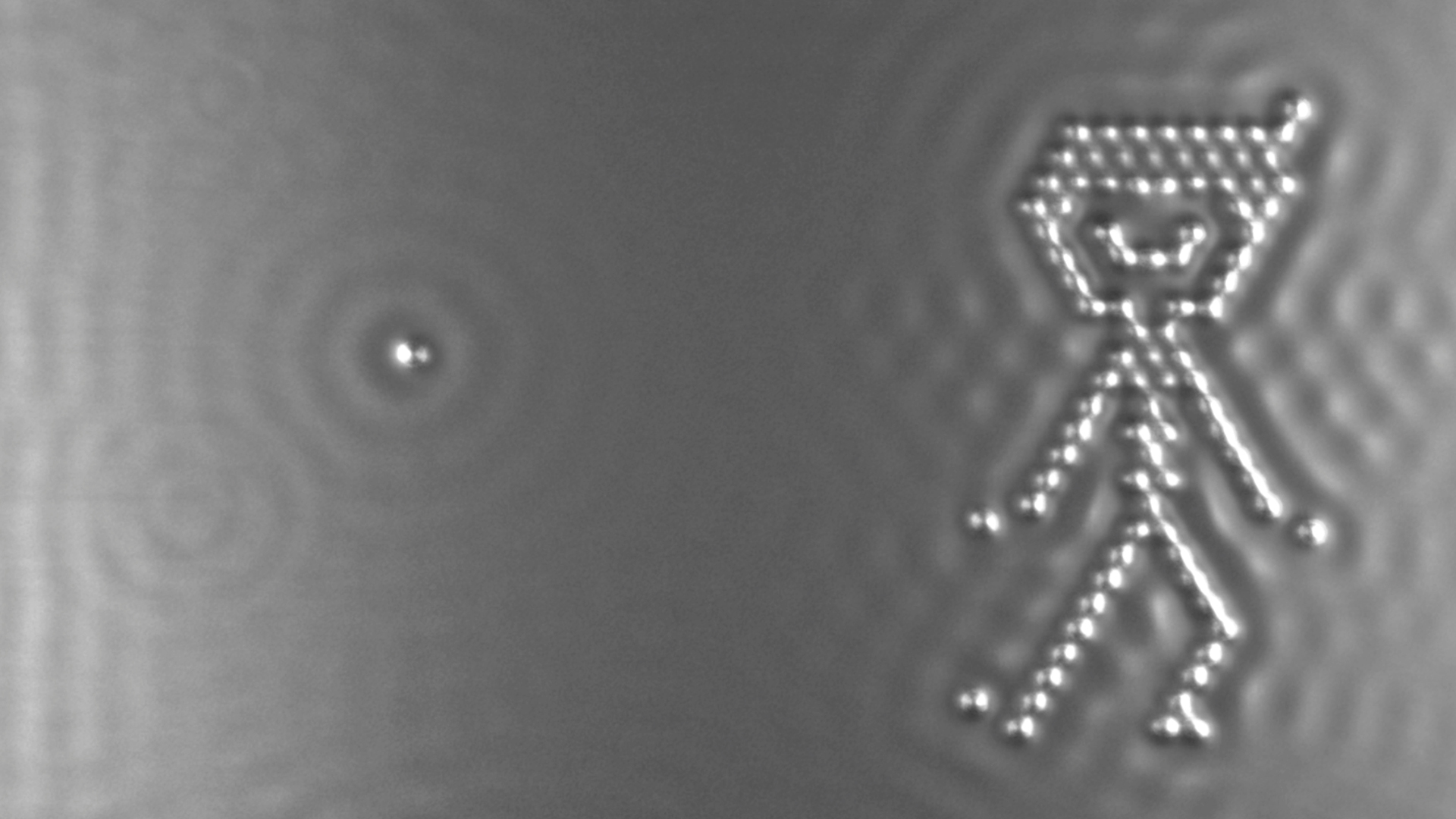
- The atom (left) and the boy. This film was made using individual carbon monoxide molecules and photographed using a scanning tunneling microscope.
- Directed by: Nico Casavecchia
- Production company: 1st Ave Machine
- Distributed by: IBM Research
- Release date: April 30, 2013
- Running time: 1 minute 33 seconds
- Language: English

A Boy and His Atom is a 2013 stop-motion animated short film released on YouTube by IBM Research. One minute in length, it was made by moving carbon monoxide molecules with a scanning tunneling microscope, a device that magnifies them 100 million times. These two-atom molecules were moved to create images, which were then saved as individual frames to make the film. The movie was recognized by Guinness World Records as the World's Smallest Stop-Motion Film in 2013.

The scientists at IBM Research – Almaden who made the film are moving atoms to explore the limits of data storage because, as data creation and consumption gets bigger, data storage needs to get smaller, all the way down to the atomic level. Traditional silicon transistor technology has become cheaper, denser and more efficient, but fundamental physical limitations suggest that scaling down is an unsustainable path to solving the growing Big Data dilemma. This team of scientists is particularly interested in starting on the smallest scale, single atoms, and building structures up from there. Using this method, IBM announced it can now store a single bit of information in just 12 atoms (current technology as of 2012 takes roughly one million atoms to store a single bit).

== Creation ==
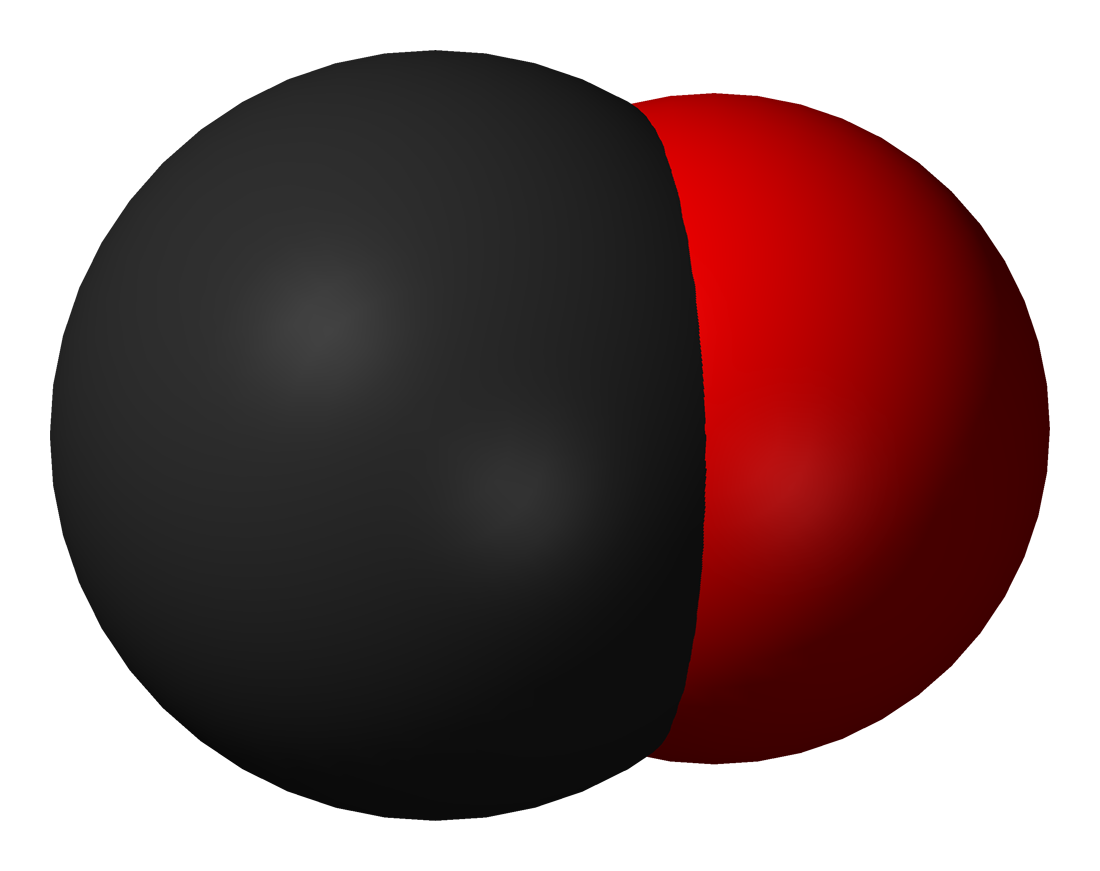
Diagram of a carbon monoxide molecule

A Boy And His Atom was created by a team of IBM scientists – together with Ogilvy & Mather, IBM's longstanding advertising agency – at the company's Almaden Research Center in San Jose, California. Using a scanning tunneling microscope, carbon monoxide molecules were manipulated into place on a copper substrate with a copper needle at a distance of 1 nanometer. They remain in place, forming a bond with the substrate because of the extremely low temperature of 5 K (−268.15 °C, −450.67 °F) at which the device operates. The oxygen component of each molecule shows up as a dot when photographed by the scanning tunneling microscope, allowing the creation of images composed of many such dots.

The team created 242 still images with 65 carbon monoxide molecules. The images were combined to make a stop-motion film. Each frame measures 45 by 25 nanometers. It took four researchers two weeks of 18-hour days to produce the film.

The graphics and sound effects resemble those of early video games. "This movie is a fun way to share the atomic-scale world," said project leader Andreas J. Heinrich. "The reason we made this was not to convey a scientific message directly, but to engage with students, to prompt them to ask questions." In addition, the researchers created three still images to promote Star Trek Into Darkness—the Federation logo, the starship Enterprise, and a Vulcan salute.

== Reaction ==
Guinness World Records certified the movie as The World's Smallest Stop-Motion Film ever made. The film was accepted into the Tribeca Online Film Festival and shown at the New York Tech Meet-up and the World Science Festival. The film surpassed a million views in 24 hours, and two million views in 48 hours, with more than 27,000 likes. As of February 2026, the film has over 26 million views and over 805,000 likes.

== Implications ==
While the film was used by the researchers as a fun way to get students interested in science, it grew out of work that could increase the amount of data computers could store. In 2012, they demonstrated that they could store a bit of computer memory on a group of just 12 atoms instead of a million, the previous minimum. If it became commercially viable, "You could carry around, not just two movies on your iPhone," Heinrich said in a companion video about the film's production, "you could carry around every movie ever produced."

== See also ==
- Teeny Ted from Turnip Town, the "world's smallest book" which requires an electron microscope to be read
