= Nico Casavecchia =

- Born: May 13, 1981 (age 44); Buenos Aires
- Occupation(s): Artist; Film director screenwriter

Nico Casavecchia (born Nicolás Casavecchia; May 13, 1981) is an Emmy nominated Argentine director, screenwriter and illustrator. His work includes music videos, commercials and film, often employing mixed media techniques ranging from animation to live action. Casavecchia most notably directed A Boy and His Atom (2013) a stop-motion animated short film created by IBM Research scientists, made by moving carbon monoxide molecules. The movie has been recognised by the Guinness Book of World Records as the World's Smallest Stop-Motion Film. Other notable projects from Casavecchia include Finding Sofía a romantic comedy premiered in Austin Film Festival, BattleScar, a VR film starring Rosario Dawson premiered at Sundance 2018, Momoguro Legends of Uno, nominated for an Emmy in 2023, and Border Hopper, a 2024 Sundance selected short film based on true events.

== Career ==
Casavecchia was born and raised in Buenos Aires, Argentina. He studied graphic design in the University of Buenos Aires for 8 months before dropping out and has been an autodidact ever since. His professional career began while working for graphic design studios and advertising agencies. In 2001 he won the first edition of OFFF festival in the ARTS category, this event motivated him to move to Barcelona, where he lived for the following 11 years. In 2004, Casavecchia co-funded AÄB, a multi disciplinary studio together with his partners Hernan Curioni and Agustín Verrastro. In AÄB he explored different filmmaking techniques influenced by Verrastro's expertise in animation and Curioni's talent in art direction and illustration. These influences would inform his signature mix-media style. After AÄB's dissolution, Casavecchia started directing under his own name. In 2012, Casavecchia moved to New York. He currently lives in Los Angeles with his wife and collaborator, Mercedes Arturo.

In 2009 Casavecchia directed Salesman in the Mirror, a 9-minute comedy following a pivotal night in the life of a frustrated director of commercials traveling to Barcelona. The film was distributed by Future Shorts. In 2010 he released Buildings & Vampires, a tribute to the movie Where the Wild Things Are by Spike Jonze. In the short Casavecchia employs part of the original movie soundtrack to re-create the story Max tells his mother. The short story comes to life in a mix-media animation. Buildings and Vampires was showcased in festivals around the world.

Casavecchia made his feature-length directorial debut when he wrote and directed the romantic comedy Finding Sofía (2016). The film premiered at the Austin Film Festival and picked up distribution from Gunpowder & Sky / FilmBuff internationally.

Casavecchia next collaborated with the multidisciplinary artist Martín Allais as a writer and co-director of BattleScar, a VR film starring Rosario Dawson following the story of Lupe, a Puerto Rican American teen who yearns to conquer the Punk Rock Scene of the New York’s Lower East Side in the late 70s. BattleScar premiered at the 2018 Sundance Film Festival in the New Frontiers category and collected critical acclaim. Adi Robertson from The Verge described BattleScar as having “unusual confidence and sophistication.” BattleScar was also covered by IndieWire, Screen Anarchy, Filmmaker Magazine, among other outlets, and won Best VR Experience at the Raindance Film Festival in London.

After the success of BattleScar, Casavecchia collaborated with Allais again in creating Momoguro, a multi-platform franchise developed in collaboration with 10-time Emmy award winning studio Baobab. The first installment of the franchise, Momoguro Legends of Uno, was nominated for the 2023 Children’s and Family Emmy in the category of Outstanding Interactive Media.

In 2024, Border Hopper, a short film directed by Casavecchia and co-written with his wife Mercedes Arturo, was selected for the official lineup of the 2024 Sundance Film Festival in the International category. Border Hopper is a supernatural horror film, executed using the mix media style that became Casavecchia’s signature style throughout his career.

== Public speakings ==
Casavecchia has participated in various international conferences as a public speaker. The talks explore the themes of failure, creativity and hybrid disciplines and are frequently illustrated with personal experiences and anecdotes of his own career. The conferences evolve and change depending on the venue but are always titled Story of my professional failures.

== Awards ==
In 2013 A Boy and His Atom won a Golden and Bronze lion at the Cannes Lions International Advertising Festival. In 2014 it also won the AICP NEXT Award. Casavecchia's work have won Golden Laus in 2009 and was nominated for awards in Siggraph, Viedram Film Festival, and Netherlands Film Festival. BattleScar won Best Animated Experience at Raindance 2019
