= Astra TV Award for Best Supporting Actor in a Streaming Comedy Series =

Award presented by the Hollywood Creative Alliance

Astra Award for Best Supporting Actor in a Streaming Comedy Series
- Presented by: Hollywood Creative Alliance
- First award: 2021
- Currently held by: Ebon Moss-Bachrach, The Bear (2024)

The Astra Award for Best Supporting Actor in a Streaming Comedy Series is an annual award presented by the Hollywood Creative Alliance to honor the best supporting performance by an actor on a comedy television series on streaming service. It has been given since its inaugural edition.

== Winners and nominees ==
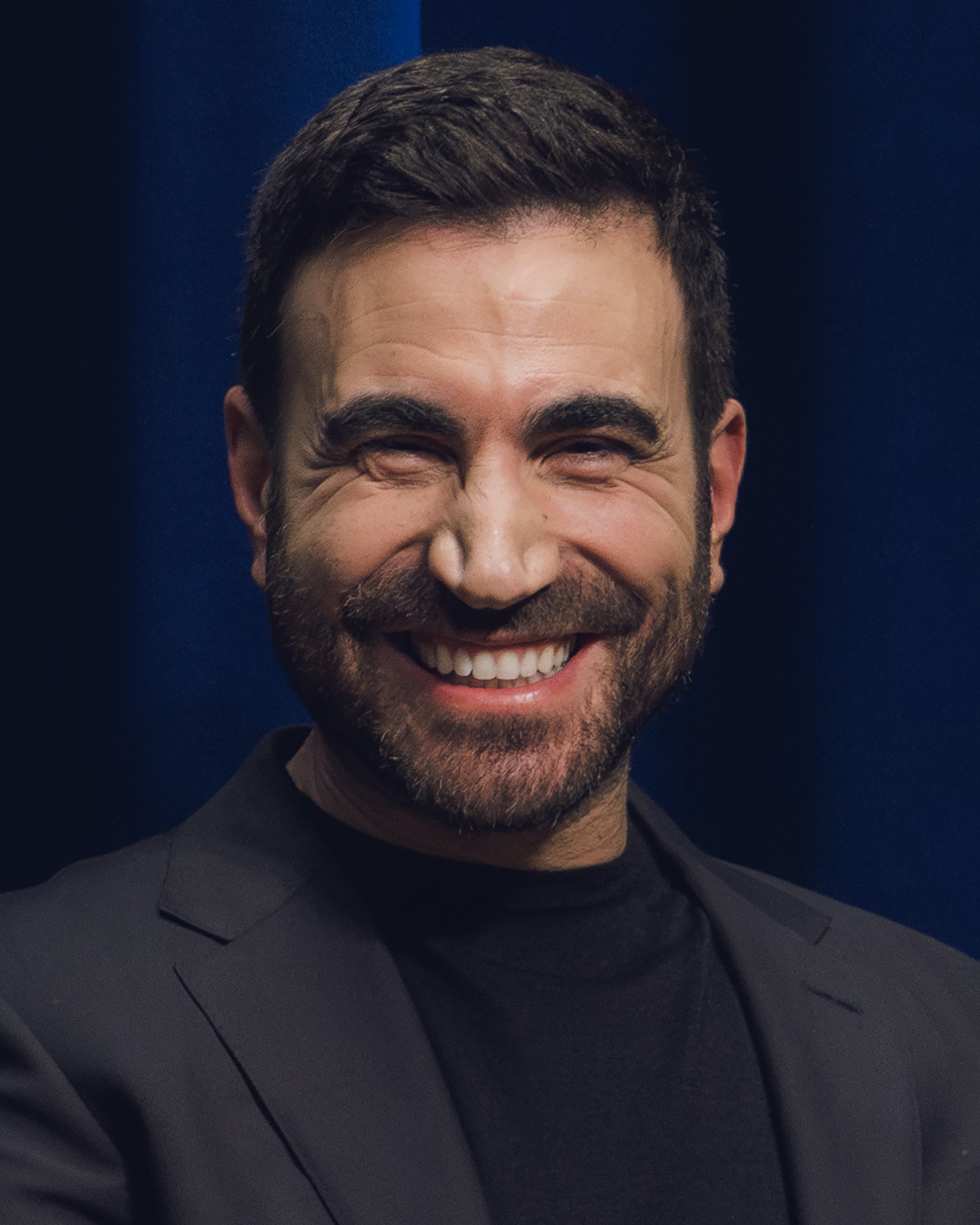
Brett Goldstein, 2021 and 2022 winner

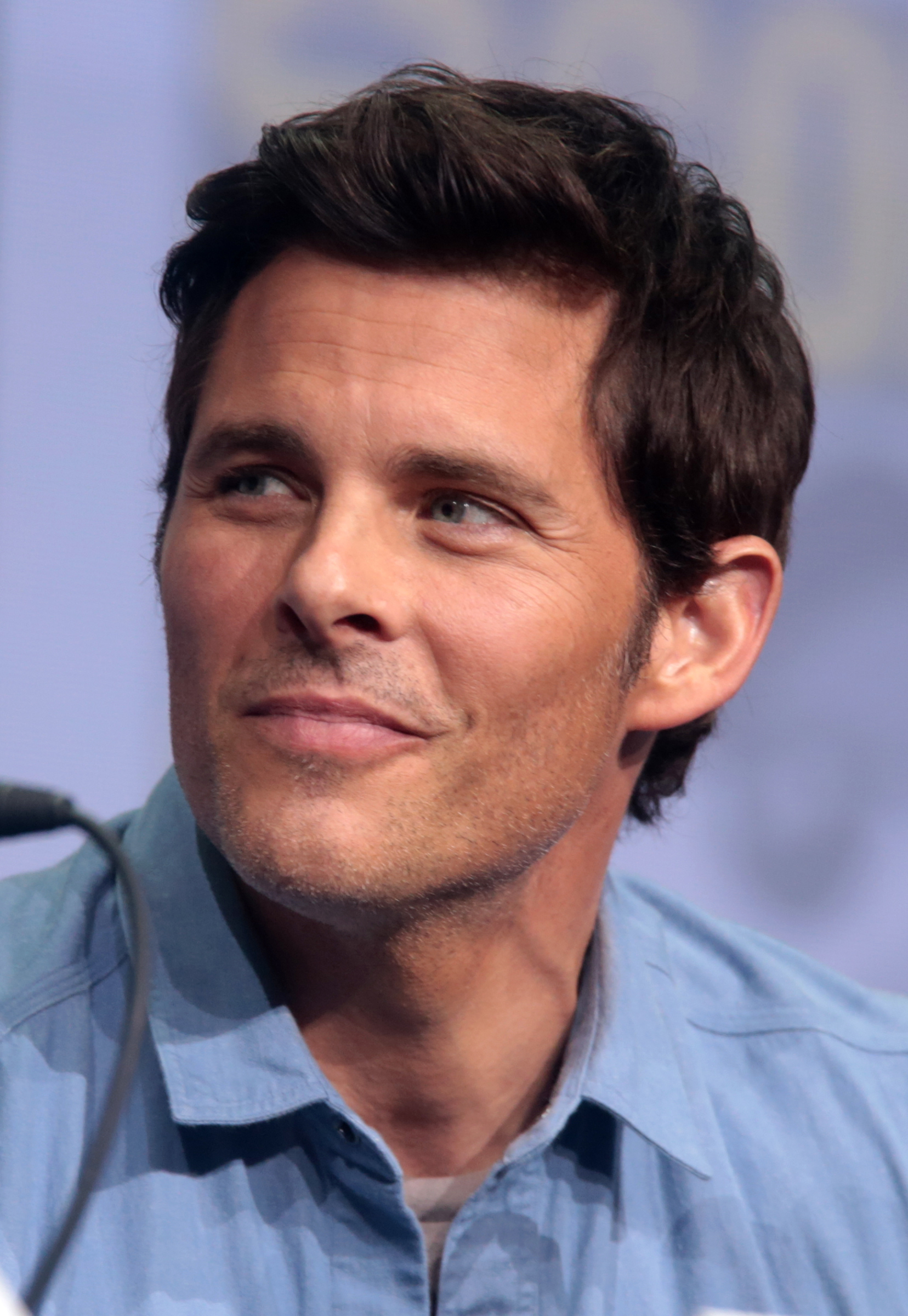
James Marsden, 2023 winner

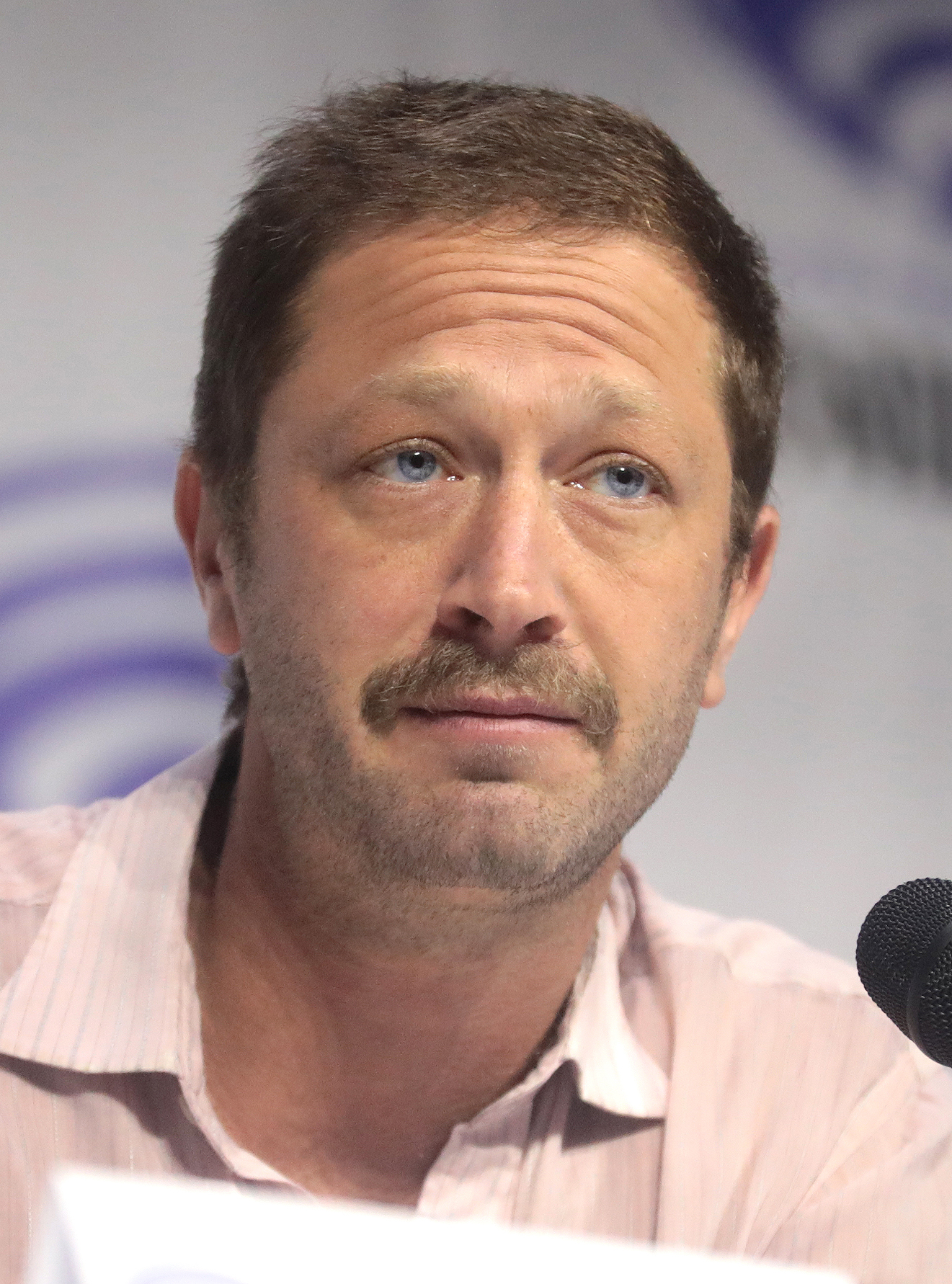
Ebon Moss-Bachrach, 2024 winner

Winners are listed first in colored row and highlighted in boldface, followed by other nominees.

Year	Actor	Role	Program	Network
2021 (1st)
2021 (1st)	**Brett Goldstein**	**Roy Kent**	**Ted Lasso**	**Apple TV+**
2021 (1st)	Brendan Hunt	Coach Beard	Ted Lasso	Apple TV+
2021 (1st)	Danny Pudi	Brad Bakshi	Mythic Quest	Apple TV+
2021 (1st)	Jeremy Swift	Leslie Higgins	Ted Lasso	Apple TV+
2021 (1st)	Nick Mohammed	Nathan Shelley	Ted Lasso	Apple TV+
2021 (1st)	Patton Oswalt	Principal Ralph Durbin	A.P. Bio	Peacock
2021 (1st)	Ray Romano	Herbert Green	Made for Love	HBO Max
2022 (2nd)
2022 (2nd)	**Brett Goldstein**	**Roy Kent**	**Ted Lasso**	**Apple TV+**
2022 (2nd)	Ben Schwartz	Yasper	The Afterparty	Apple TV+
2022 (2nd)	Nathan Lane	Teddy Dimas	Only Murders in the Building	Hulu
2022 (2nd)	Nick Mohammed	Nathan Shelley	Ted Lasso	Apple TV+
2022 (2nd)	Paul W. Downs	Jimmy LuSaque	Hacks	HBO Max
2022 (2nd)	Taika Waititi	Ed Teach / Blackbeard	Our Flag Means Death	HBO Max
2022 (2nd)	Toheeb Jimoh	Sam Obisanya	Ted Lasso	Apple TV+
2022 (2nd)	Tony Shalhoub	Abe Weissman	The Marvelous Mrs. Maisel	Prime Video
2023 (3rd)
2023 (3rd)	**James Marsden**	**Himself**	**Jury Duty**	**Amazon Freevee**
2023 (3rd)	Benjamin Bratt	Cliff LeGrand	Poker Face	Peacock
2023 (3rd)	Brendan Hunt	Coach Beard	Ted Lasso	Apple TV+
2023 (3rd)	Brett Goldstein	Roy Kent	Ted Lasso	Apple TV+
2023 (3rd)	Ebon Moss-Bachrach	Richard "Richie" Jerimovich	The Bear	FX on Hulu
2023 (3rd)	Harrison Ford	Dr. Paul Rhoades	Shrinking	Apple TV+
2023 (3rd)	James Marsden	Ben Wood	Dead to Me	Netflix
2023 (3rd)	Ke Huy Quan	Jamie Yao	American Born Chinese	Disney+
2023 (3rd)	Phil Dunster	Jamie Tartt	Ted Lasso	Apple TV+
2023 (3rd)	Tony Shalhoub	Abe Weissman	The Marvelous Mrs. Maisel	Prime Video
2024 (4th)
2024 (4th)	**Ebon Moss-Bachrach**	**Richard "Richie" Jerimovich**	**The Bear**	**FX on Hulu**
2024 (4th)	Carl Clemons-Hopkins	Marcus	Hacks	Max
2024 (4th)	Giancarlo Esposito	Stanley Johnston	The Gentlemen	Netflix
2024 (4th)	Matty Matheson	Neil Fak	The Bear	FX on Hulu
2024 (4th)	Oliver Platt	Jimmy "Cicero" Kalinowski	The Bear	FX on Hulu
2024 (4th)	Paul Rudd	Ben Glenroy	Only Murders in the Building	Hulu
2024 (4th)	Paul W. Downs	Jimmy LuSaque Jr.	Hacks	Max
2024 (4th)	Ricky Martin	Robert Diaz	Palm Royale	Apple TV+
