= Astra TV Award for Best Supporting Actor in a Broadcast Network or Cable Comedy Series =

Award presented by the Hollywood Creative Alliance

Astra Award for Best Supporting Actor in a Broadcast Network or Cable Comedy Series
- Presented by: Hollywood Creative Alliance
- First award: 2021
- Currently held by: Harvey Guillén, What We Do in the Shadows (2024)

The Astra Award for Best Supporting Actor in a Broadcast Network or Cable Comedy Series is an annual award presented by the Hollywood Creative Alliance to honor the best supporting performance by an actor on a comedy television series on broadcast or cable network. It has been given since its inaugural edition.

== Winners and nominees ==
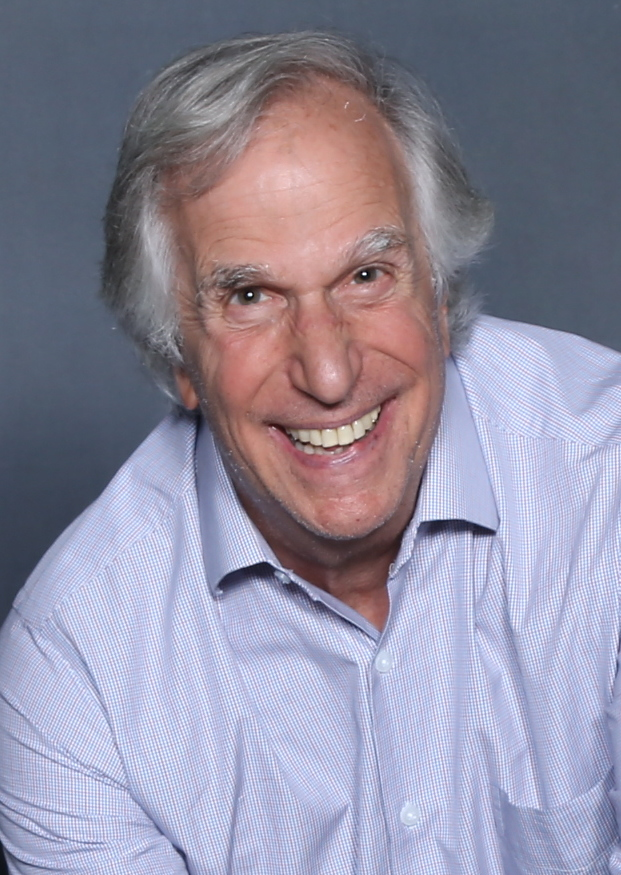
Henry Winkler, 2022 winner

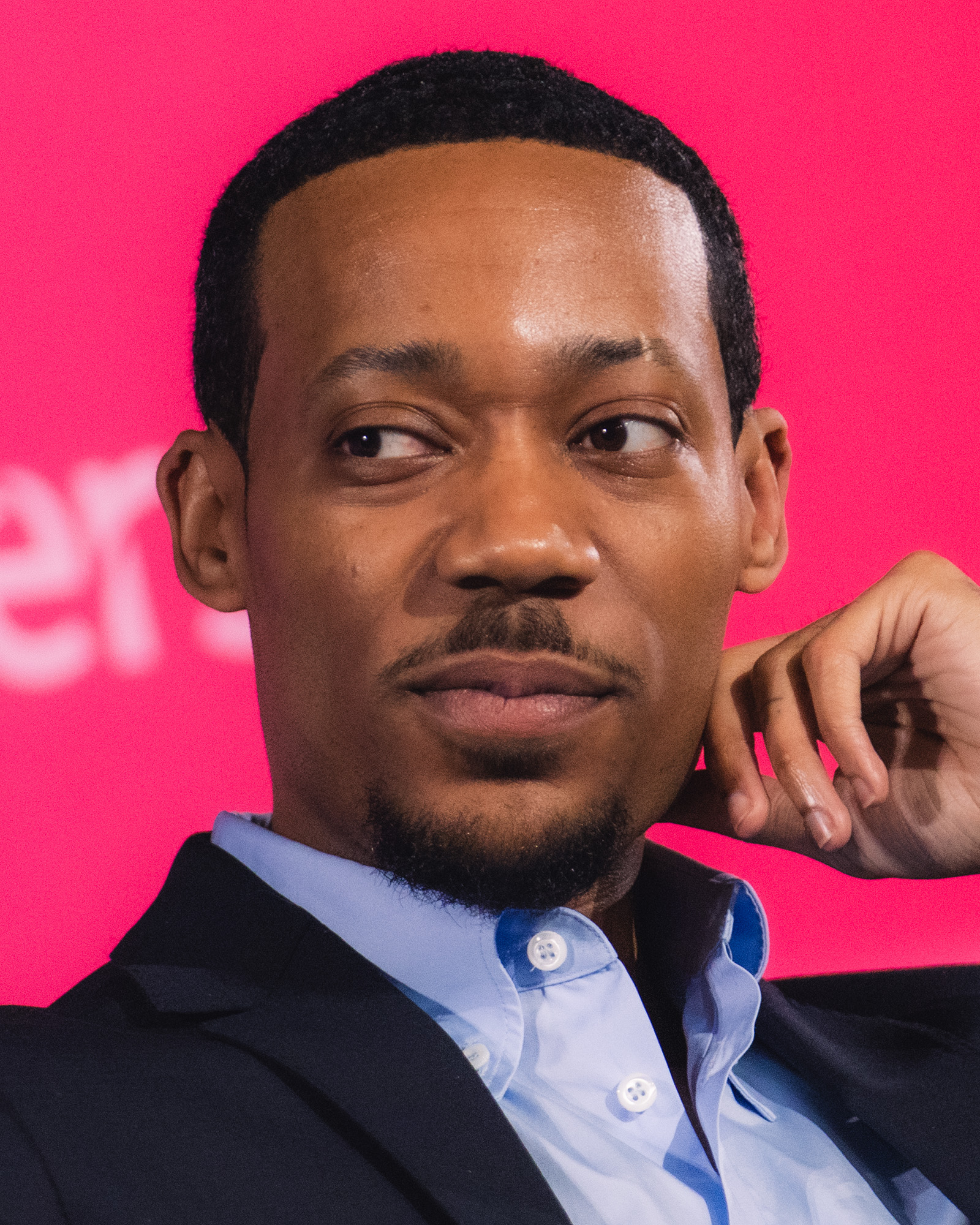
Tyler James Williams, 2023 winner

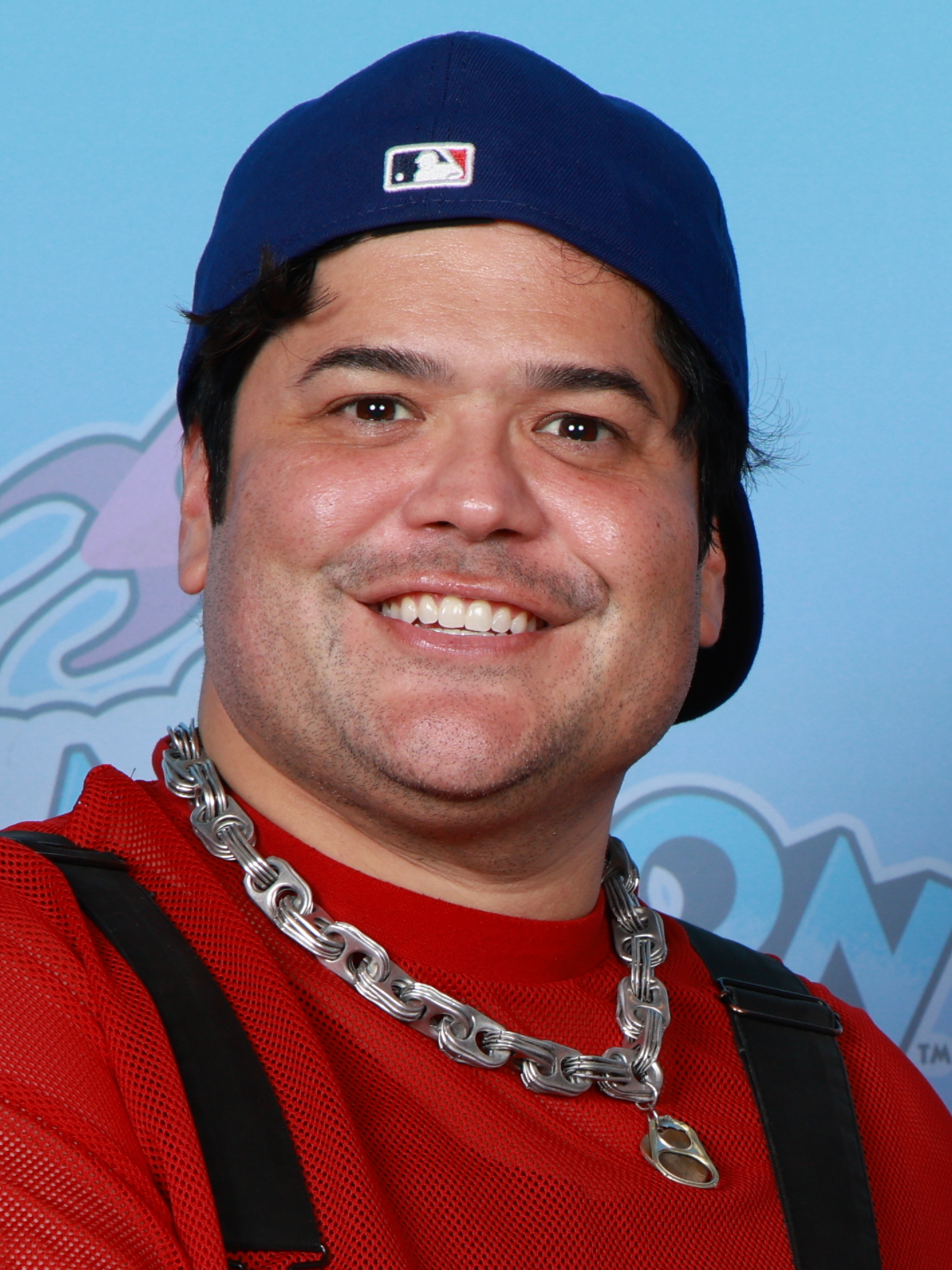
Harvey Guillén, 2024 winner

Winners are listed first in colored row and highlighted in boldface, followed by other nominees.

Year	Actor	Role	Program	Network
2021 (1st)
2021 (1st)	**Nico Santos**	**Mateo Fernando Aquino Liwanag**	**Superstore**	**NBC**
2021 (1st)	Alex Newell	Mo	Zoey's Extraordinary Playlist	NBC
2021 (1st)	Corey Reynolds	Mike Thompson	Resident Alien	Syfy
2021 (1st)	Dwayne Johnson	Himself	Young Rock	NBC
2021 (1st)	John Clarence Stewart	Simon	Zoey's Extraordinary Playlist	NBC
2021 (1st)	Skylar Astin	Max Richman	Zoey's Extraordinary Playlist	NBC
2022 (2nd)
2022 (2nd)	**Henry Winkler**	**Gene Cousineau**	**Barry**	**HBO**
2022 (2nd)	Anthony Carrigan	NoHo Hank	Barry	HBO
2022 (2nd)	Bowen Yang	Various Characters	Saturday Night Live	NBC
2022 (2nd)	Brandon Scott Jones	Captain Isaac Higgintoot	Ghosts	CBS
2022 (2nd)	Brian Tyree Henry	Alfred "Paper Boi" Miles	Atlanta	FX
2022 (2nd)	Chris Perfetti	Jacob Hill	Abbott Elementary	ABC
2022 (2nd)	Harvey Guillén	Guillermo de la Cruz	What We Do in the Shadows	FX
2022 (2nd)	Tyler James Williams	Gregory Eddie	Abbott Elementary	ABC
2023 (3rd)
2023 (3rd)	**Tyler James Williams**	**Gregory Eddie**	**Abbott Elementary**	**ABC**
2023 (3rd)	Brandon Scott Jones	Captain Isaac Higgintoot	Ghosts	CBS
2023 (3rd)	Brian Tyree Henry	Alfred "Paper Boi" Miles	Atlanta	FX
2023 (3rd)	Harvey Guillén	Guillermo de la Cruz	What We Do in the Shadows	FX
2023 (3rd)	Henry Winkler	Gene Cousineau	Barry	HBO
2023 (3rd)	Ken Marino	Ronald Wayne "Ron" Donald	Party Down	Starz
2023 (3rd)	Leslie Jordan (posthumous nomination)	Phil	Call Me Kat	Fox
2023 (3rd)	Martin Starr	Roman DeBeers	Party Down	Starz
2023 (3rd)	Ryan Hansen	Kyle Bradway	Party Down	Starz
2023 (3rd)	William Stanford Davis	Mr. Johnson	Abbott Elementary	ABC
2024 (4th)
2024 (4th)	**Harvey Guillén**	**Guillermo de la Cruz**	**What We Do in the Shadows**	**FX**
2024 (4th)	Asher Grodman	Trevor Lefkowitz	Ghosts	CBS
2024 (4th)	Bowen Yang	Various Characters	Saturday Night Live	NBC
2024 (4th)	Brandon Scott Jones	Captain Isaac Higgintoot	Ghosts	CBS
2024 (4th)	Chris Perfetti	Jacob Hill	Abbott Elementary	ABC
2024 (4th)	J. B. Smoove	Leon Black	Curb Your Enthusiasm	HBO
2024 (4th)	Richie Moriarty	Peter "Pete" Martino	Ghosts	CBS
2024 (4th)	Tyler James Williams	Gregory Eddie	Abbott Elementary	ABC
