= Astra TV Award for Best Actor in a Broadcast Network or Cable Comedy Series =

Award presented by the Hollywood Creative Alliance

Astra Award for Best Actor in a Broadcast Network or Cable Comedy Series
- Presented by: Hollywood Creative Alliance
- First award: 2021
- Currently held by: Alan Tudyk, Resident Alien (2024)

The Astra Award for Best Actor in a Broadcast Network or Cable Comedy Series is an annual award presented by the Hollywood Creative Alliance to honor the best leading performance by an actor on a comedy television series on broadcast or cable network. It has been given since its inaugural edition.

== Winners and nominees ==
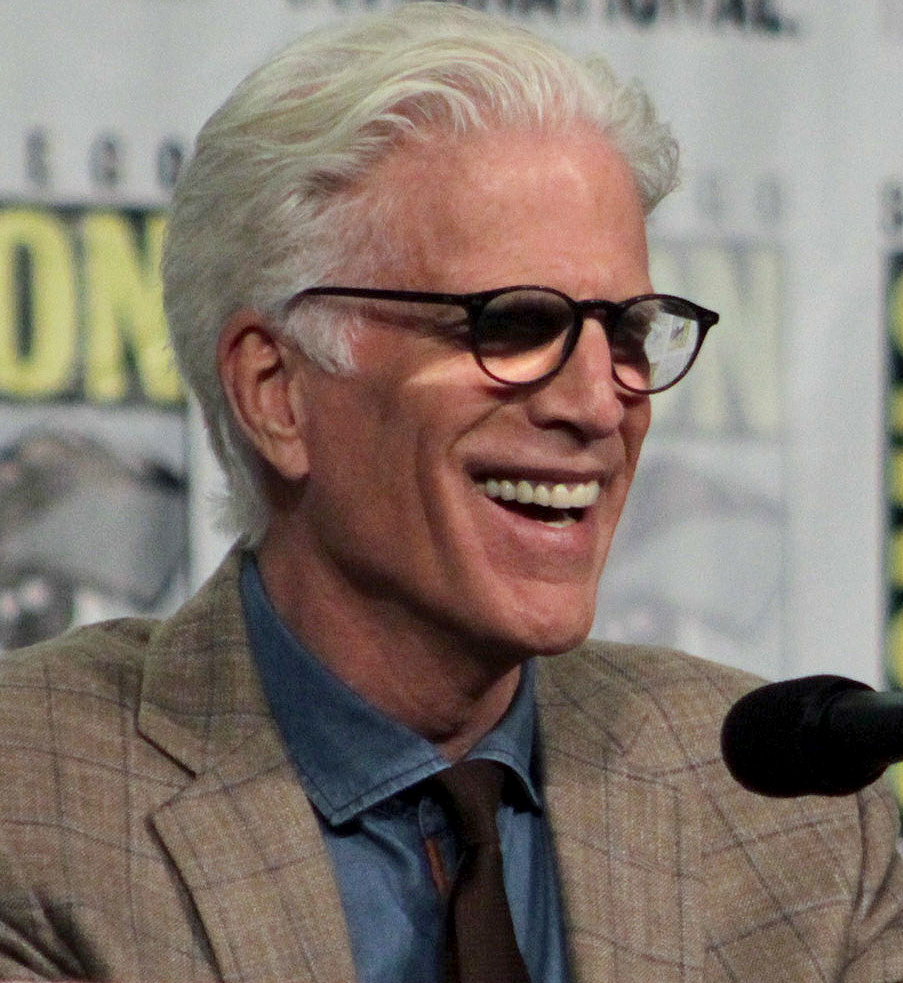
Ted Danson, 2021 winner

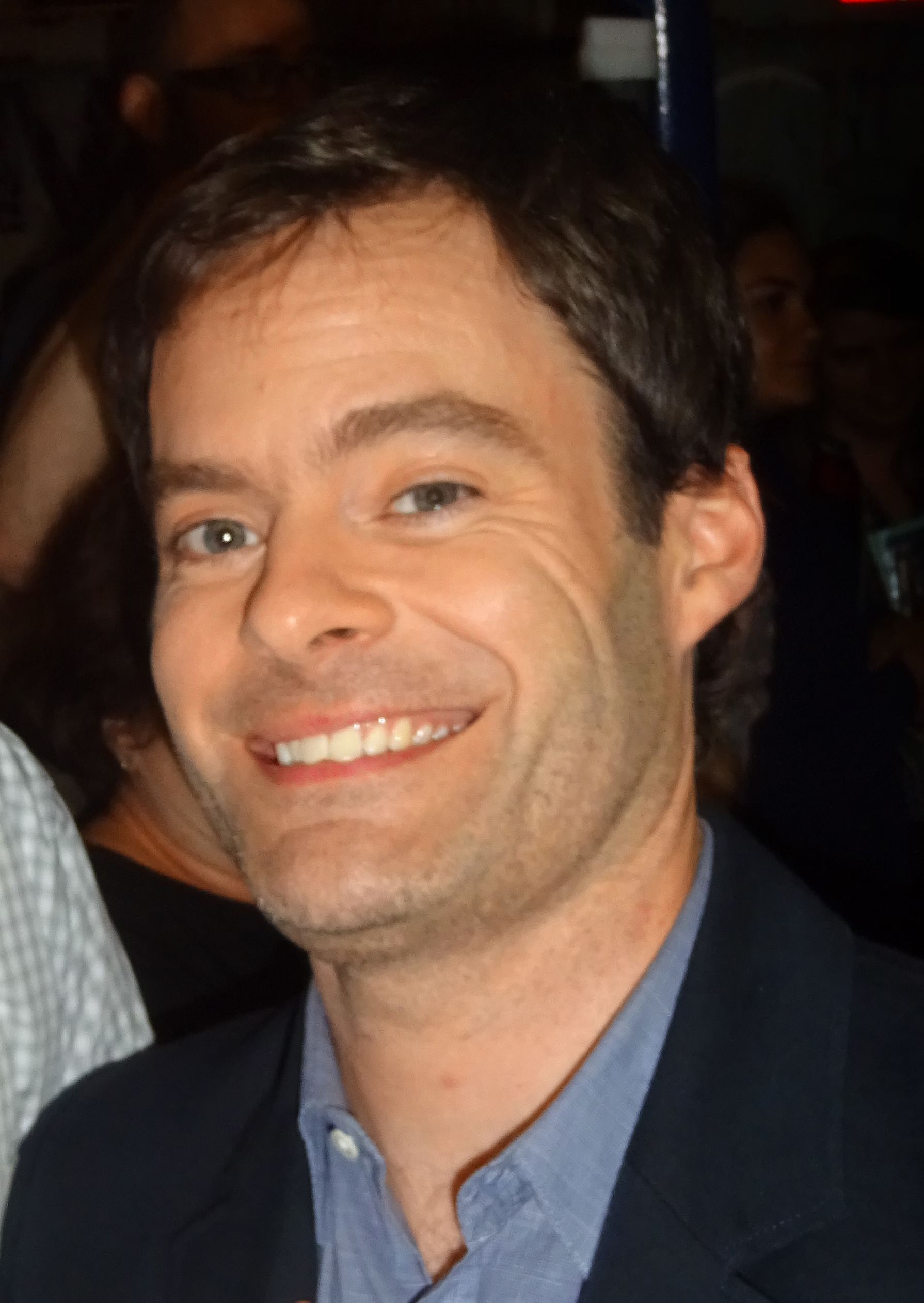
Bill Hader, 2022 winner

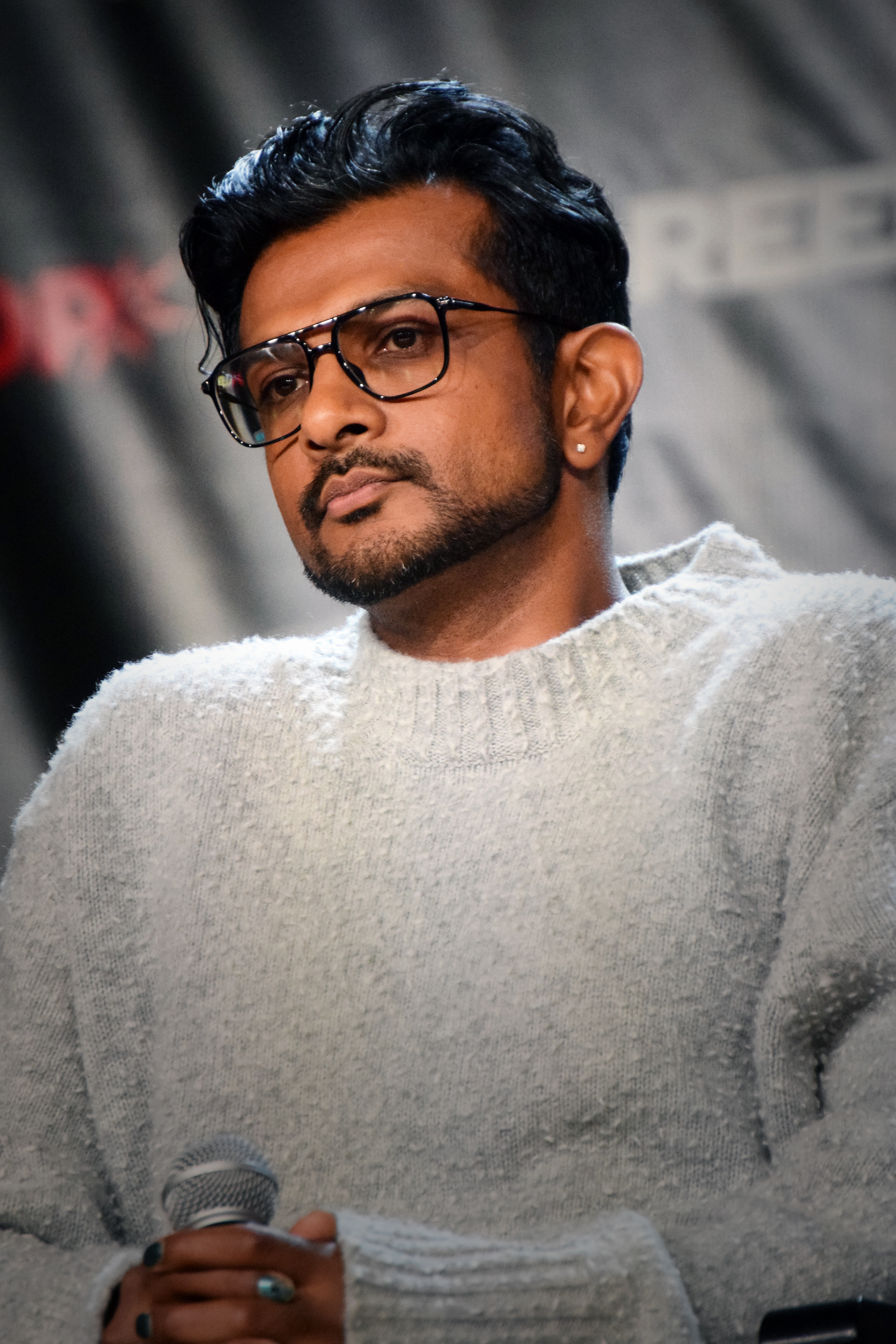
Utkarsh Ambudkar, 2023 winner

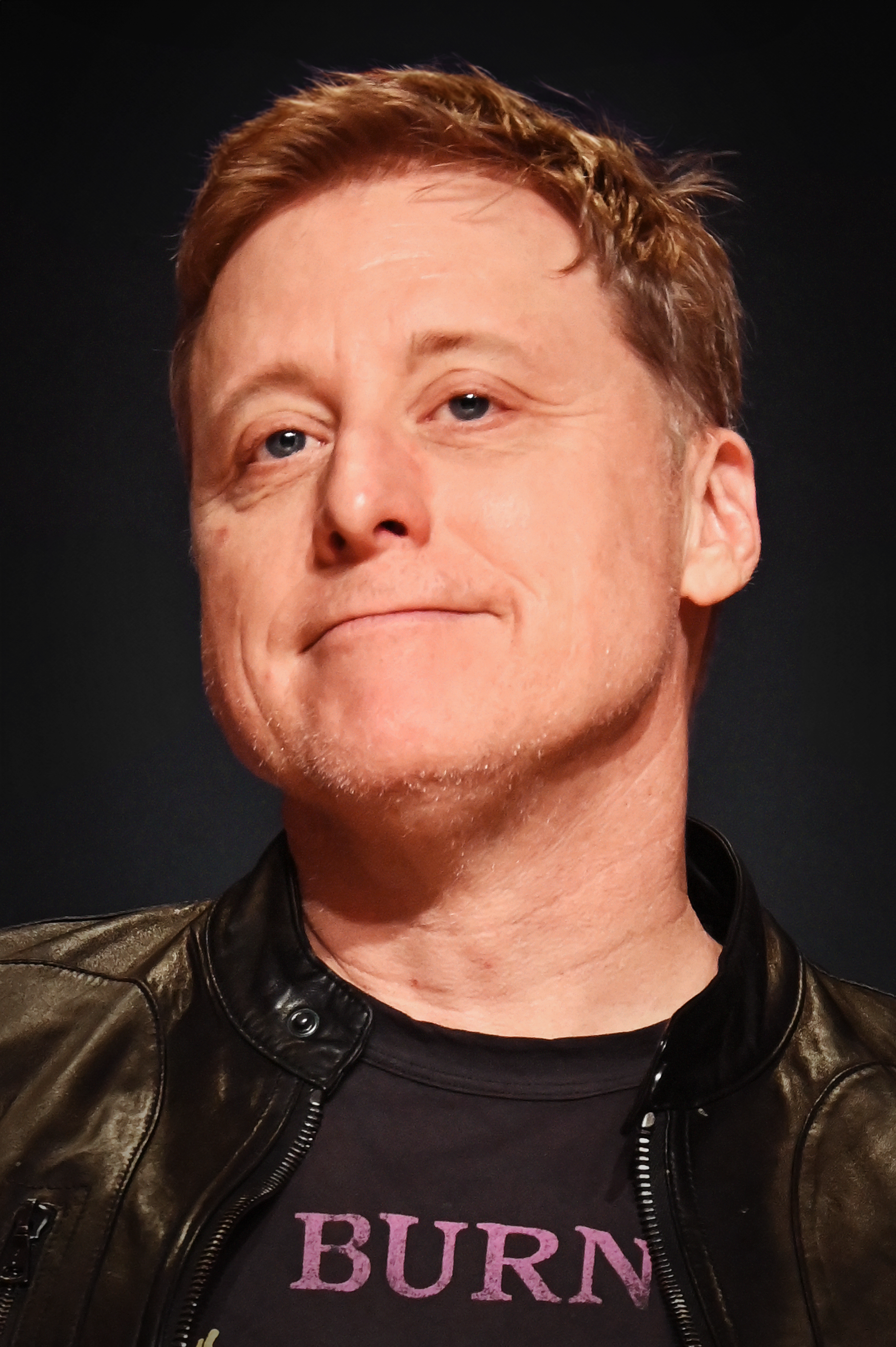
Alan Tudyk, 2024 winner

Winners are listed first in colored row and highlighted in boldface, followed by other nominees.

Year	Actor	Role	Program	Network
2021 (1st)
2021 (1st)	**Ted Danson**	**Neil Bremer**	**Mr. Mayor**	**NBC**
2021 (1st)	Alan Tudyk	Harry Vanderspeigle	Resident Alien	Syfy
2021 (1st)	Anthony Anderson	Andre "Dre" Johnson Sr.	Black-ish	ABC
2021 (1st)	Joseph Lee Anderson	Rocky Johnson	Young Rock	NBC
2021 (1st)	Martin Freeman	Paul Worsley	Breeders	FX
2022 (2nd)
2022 (2nd)	**Bill Hader**	**Barry Berkman / Barry Block**	**Barry**	**HBO**
2022 (2nd)	Andy Samberg	Det. Jake Peralta	Brooklyn Nine-Nine	NBC
2022 (2nd)	Anthony Anderson	Andre "Dre" Johnson Sr.	Black-ish	ABC
2022 (2nd)	Donald Glover	Earnest "Earn" Marks	Atlanta	FX
2022 (2nd)	Kayvan Novak	Nandor the Relentless	What We Do in the Shadows	FX
2022 (2nd)	Larry David	Himself	Curb Your Enthusiasm	HBO
2022 (2nd)	Matt Berry	Leslie "Laszlo" Cravensworth	What We Do in the Shadows	FX
2022 (2nd)	Utkarsh Ambudkar	Jay Arondekar	Ghosts	CBS
2023 (3rd)
2023 (3rd)	**Utkarsh Ambudkar**	**Jay Arondekar**	**Ghosts**	**CBS**
2023 (3rd)	Adam Scott	Jenry Pollard	Party Down	Starz
2023 (3rd)	Alan Tudyk	Harry Vanderspeigle	Resident Alien	Syfy
2023 (3rd)	Bill Hader	Barry Berkman	Barry	HBO
2023 (3rd)	Bob Odenkirk	William Henry "Hank" Devereaux Jr.	Lucky Hank	AMC
2023 (3rd)	Joel McHale	Frank Shaw	Animal Control	Fox
2023 (3rd)	John Goodman	Dan Conners	The Conners	ABC
2023 (3rd)	John Larroquette	Dan Fielding	Night Court	NBC
2024 (4th)
2024 (4th)	**Alan Tudyk**	**Harry Vanderspeigle**	**Resident Alien**	**Syfy**
2024 (4th)	Cedric the Entertainer	Calvin Butler	The Neighborhood	CBS
2024 (4th)	Dulé Hill	Bill Williams	The Wonder Years	ABC
2024 (4th)	Iain Armitage	Sheldon Cooper	Young Sheldon	CBS
2024 (4th)	John Goodman	Dan Conner	The Conners	ABC
2024 (4th)	Larry David	Himself	Curb Your Enthusiasm	HBO
2024 (4th)	Matt Berry	Leslie "Laszlo" Cravensworth	What We Do in the Shadows	FX
2024 (4th)	Utkarsh Ambudkar	Jay Arondekar	Ghosts	CBS
