= Astra TV Award for Best Supporting Actress in a Broadcast Network or Cable Comedy Series =

Award presented by the Hollywood Creative Alliance

Astra Award for Best Supporting Actress in a Broadcast Network or Cable Comedy Series
- Presented by: Hollywood Creative Alliance
- First award: 2021
- Currently held by: Sheryl Lee Ralph, Abbott Elementary (2024)

The Astra Award for Best Supporting Actress in a Broadcast Network or Cable Comedy Series is an annual award presented by the Hollywood Creative Alliance to honor the best supporting performance by an actress on a comedy television series on broadcast or cable network. It has been given since its inaugural edition.

== Winners and nominees ==
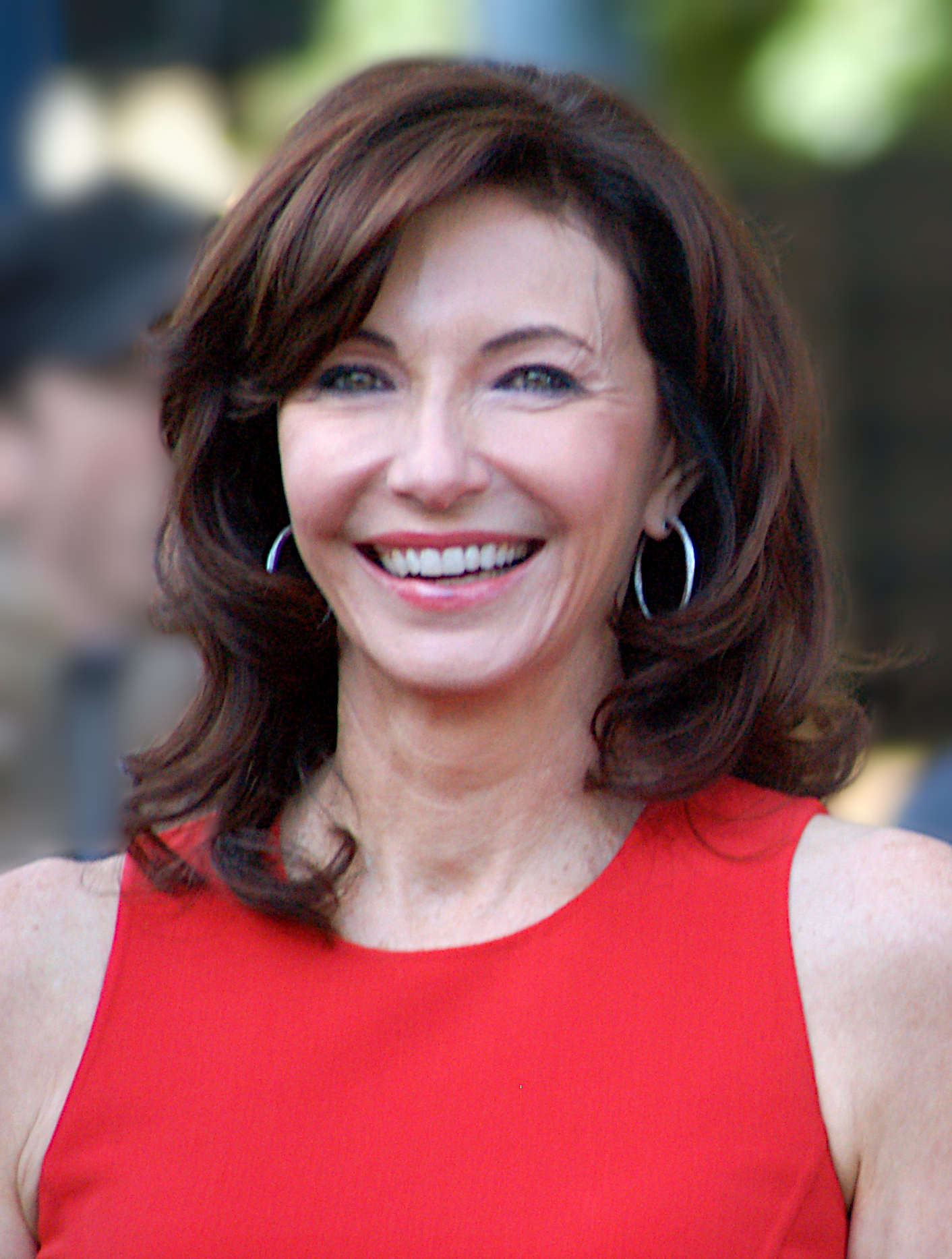
Mary Steenburgen, 2021 winner

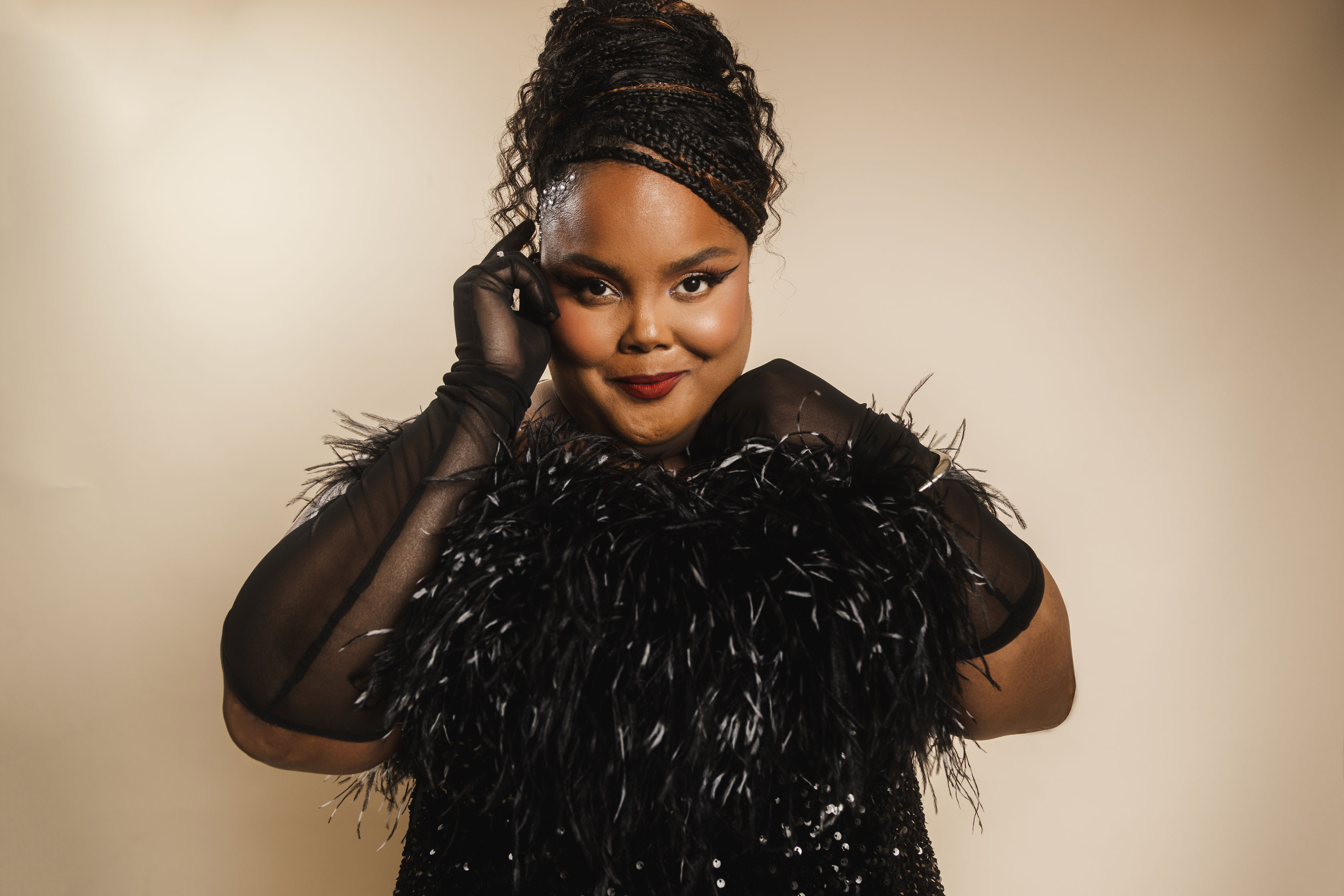
Danielle Pinnock, 2023 winner

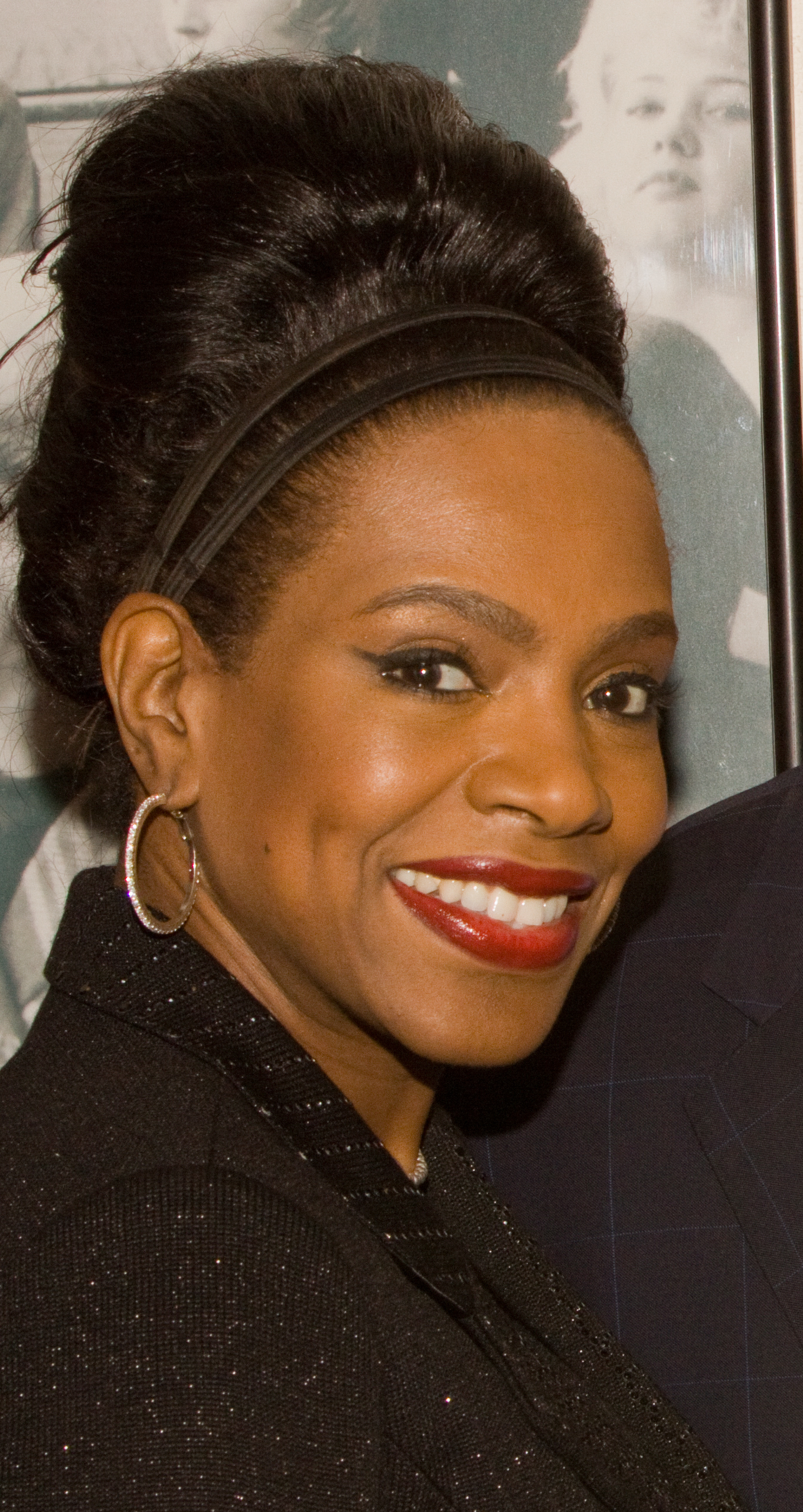
Sheryl Lee Ralph, 2024 winner

Winners are listed first in colored row and highlighted in boldface, followed by other nominees.

Year	Actor	Role	Program	Network
2021 (1st)
2021 (1st)	**Mary Steenburgen**	**Maggie Clarke**	**Zoey's Extraordinary Playlist**	**NBC**
2021 (1st)	Alice Wetterlund	D'Arcy Bloom	Resident Alien	Syfy
2021 (1st)	Ana Tuisila	Lia Maivia	Young Rock	NBC
2021 (1st)	Holly Hunter	Arpi Meskimen	Mr. Mayor	NBC
2021 (1st)	Lauren Ash	Dina Fox	Superstore	NBC
2021 (1st)	Vella Lovell	Mikaela Shaw	Mr. Mayor	NBC
2022 (2nd)
2022 (2nd)	**Janelle James**	**Ava Coleman**	**Abbott Elementary**	**ABC**
2022 (2nd)	D'Arcy Carden	Natalie Greer	Barry	HBO
2022 (2nd)	Danielle Pinnock	Alberta Haynes	Ghosts	CBS
2022 (2nd)	Kristen Schaal	The Guide	What We Do in the Shadows	FX
2022 (2nd)	Sarah Goldberg	Sally Reed	Barry	HBO
2022 (2nd)	Sheryl Lee Ralph	Barbara Howard	Abbott Elementary	ABC
2022 (2nd)	Stephanie Beatriz	Rosa Diaz	Brooklyn Nine-Nine	NBC
2022 (2nd)	Zazie Beetz	Van Keefer	Atlanta	FX
2023 (3rd)
2023 (3rd)	**Danielle Pinnock**	**Alberta Haynes**	**Ghosts**	**CBS**
2023 (3rd)	Janelle James	Ava Coleman	Abbott Elementary	ABC
2023 (3rd)	Jane Lynch	Constance Carmell	Party Down	Starz
2023 (3rd)	Jennifer Garner	Evie Adler	Party Down	Starz
2023 (3rd)	Lisa Ann Walter	Melissa Schemmenti	Abbott Elementary	ABC
2023 (3rd)	Megan Mullally	Lydia Dunfree	Party Down	Starz
2023 (3rd)	Rebecca Wisocky	Henrietta "Hetty" Woodstone	Ghosts	CBS
2023 (3rd)	Sarah Goldberg	Sally Reed	Barry	HBO
2023 (3rd)	Sheryl Lee Ralph	Barbara Howard	Abbott Elementary	ABC
2023 (3rd)	Zazie Beetz	Van Keefer	Atlanta	FX
2024 (4th)
2024 (4th)	**Sheryl Lee Ralph**	**Barbara Howard**	**Abbott Elementary**	**ABC**
2024 (4th)	Annie Potts	Constance "Connie" Tucker	Young Sheldon	CBS
2024 (4th)	Danielle Pinnock	Alberta Haynes	Ghosts	CBS
2024 (4th)	Janelle James	Ava Coleman	Abbott Elementary	ABC
2024 (4th)	Kristen Schaal	The Guide	What We Do in the Shadows	FX
2024 (4th)	Lisa Ann Walter	Melissa Schemmenti	Abbott Elementary	ABC
2024 (4th)	Rebecca Wisocky	Henrietta "Hetty" Woodstone	Ghosts	CBS
2024 (4th)	Susie Essman	Susie Greene	Curb Your Enthusiasm	HBO
