= Astra TV Award for Best Actress in a Streaming Comedy Series =

Award presented by the Hollywood Creative Alliance

Astra Award for Best Actress in a Streaming Comedy Series
- Presented by: Hollywood Creative Alliance
- First award: 2021
- Currently held by: Jean Smart, Hacks (2024)

The Astra Award for Best Actress in a Streaming Comedy Series is an annual award presented by the Hollywood Creative Alliance to honor the best leading performance by an actress on a comedy television series on streaming service. It has been given since its inaugural edition.

== Winners and nominees ==
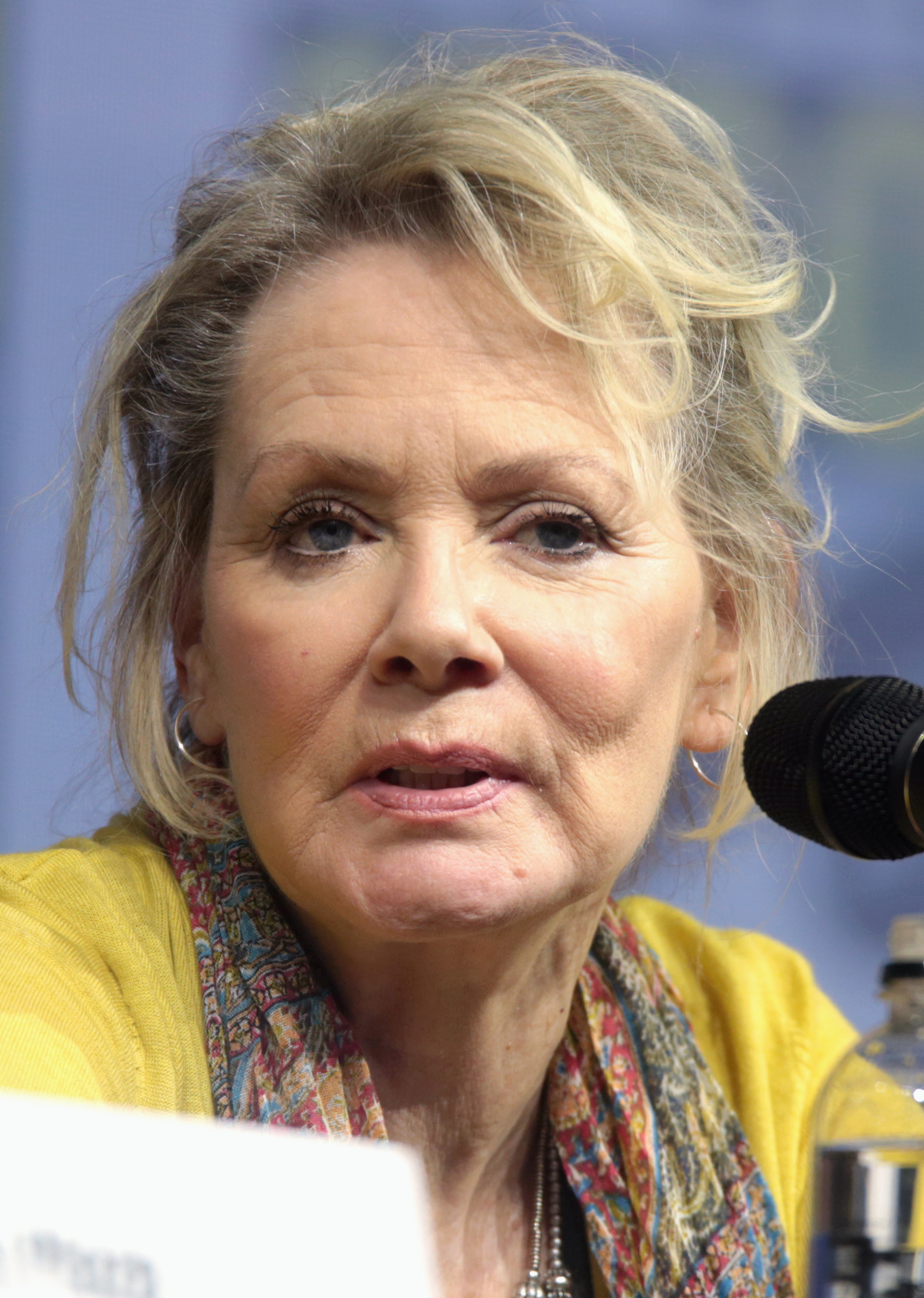
Jean Smart, 2021 and 2024 winner

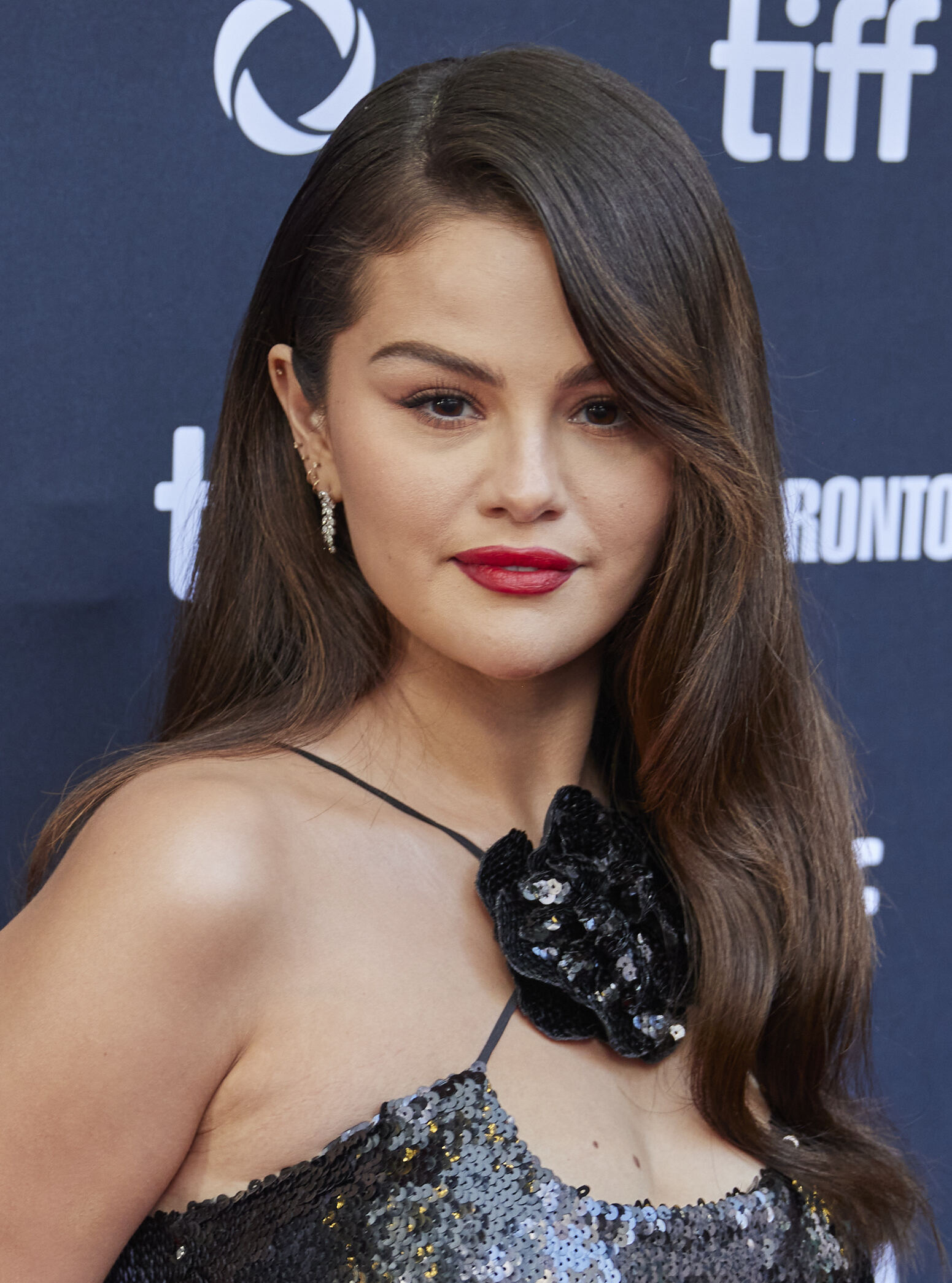
Selena Gomez, 2022 winner

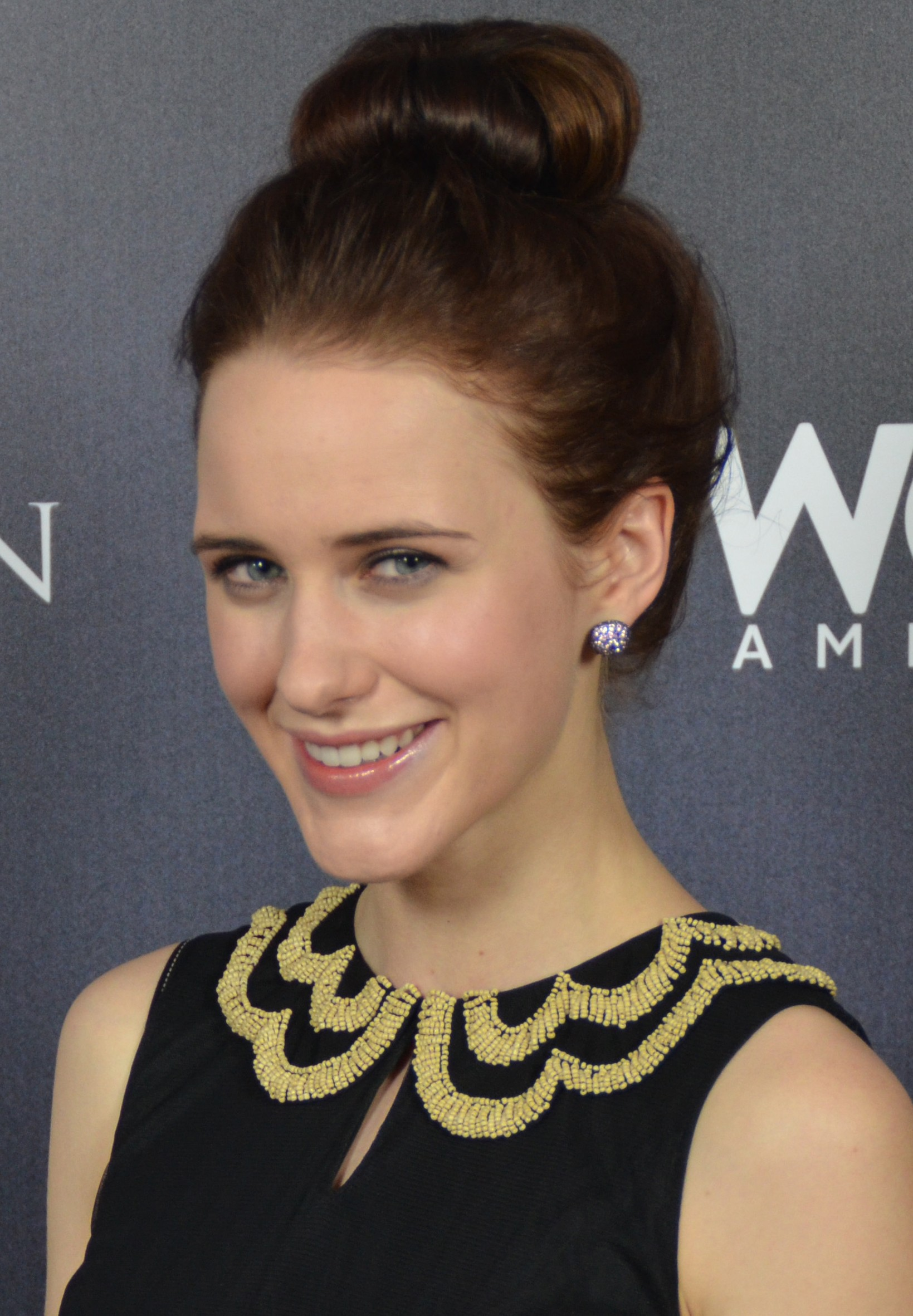
Rachel Brosnahan, 2023 winner

Winners are listed first in colored row and highlighted in boldface, followed by other nominees.

| Year | Actor | Role | Program | Network |
|---|---|---|---|---|
2021 (1st)
| 2021 (1st) | **Jean Smart** | **Deborah Vance** | **Hacks** | **HBO Max** |
| 2021 (1st) | Cristin Milioti | Hazel Green-Gogol | Made for Love | HBO Max |
| 2021 (1st) | Hailee Steinfeld | Emily Dickinson | Dickinson | Apple TV+ |
| 2021 (1st) | Kaley Cuoco | Cassie Bowden | The Flight Attendant | HBO Max |
| 2021 (1st) | Renée Elise Goldsberry | Wickie | Girls5eva | Peacock |
2022 (2nd)
| 2022 (2nd) | **Selena Gomez** | **Mabel Mora** | **Only Murders in the Building** | **Hulu** |
| 2022 (2nd) | Elle Fanning | Catherine the Great | The Great | Hulu |
| 2022 (2nd) | Hailee Steinfeld | Kate Bishop / Hawkeye | Hawkeye | Disney+ |
| 2022 (2nd) | Jean Smart | Deborah Vance | Hacks | HBO Max |
| 2022 (2nd) | Kaley Cuoco | Cassie Bowden | The Flight Attendant | HBO Max |
| 2022 (2nd) | Kat Dennings | Jules Wiley | Dollface | Hulu |
| 2022 (2nd) | Rachel Brosnahan | Miriam "Midge" Maisel | The Marvelous Mrs. Maisel | Prime Video |
| 2022 (2nd) | Tiffany Haddish | Detective Danner | The Afterparty | Apple TV+ |
2023 (3rd)
| 2023 (3rd) | **Rachel Brosnahan** | **Miriam "Midge" Maisel** | **The Marvelous Mrs. Maisel** | **Prime Video** |
| 2023 (3rd) | Christina Applegate | Jen Harding | Dead to Me | Netflix |
| 2023 (3rd) | Jenna Ortega | Wednesday Addams | Wednesday | Netflix |
| 2023 (3rd) | Kim Fields | Regina Upshaw | The Upshaws | Netflix |
| 2023 (3rd) | Maya Rudolph | Molly Novak | Loot | Apple TV+ |
| 2023 (3rd) | Natasha Lyonne | Charlie Cale | Poker Face | Peacock |
| 2023 (3rd) | Selena Gomez | Mabel Mora | Only Murders in the Building | Hulu |
| 2023 (3rd) | Tatiana Maslany | Jennifer Walters / She-Hulk | She-Hulk: Attorney at Law | Disney+ |
2024 (4th)
| 2024 (4th) | **Jean Smart** | **Deborah Vance** | **Hacks** | **Max** |
| 2024 (4th) | Ayo Edebiri | Sydney Adamu | The Bear | FX on Hulu |
| 2024 (4th) | Devery Jacobs | Edward "Eddie" Horniman | Reservation Dogs | FX on Hulu |
| 2024 (4th) | Kaley Cuoco | Ava Bartlett | Based on a True Story | Peacock |
| 2024 (4th) | Kristen Wiig | Maxine Dellacorte-Simmons | Palm Royale | Apple TV+ |
| 2024 (4th) | Maya Rudolph | Molly Wells | Loot | Apple TV+ |
| 2024 (4th) | Renée Elise Goldsberry | Wickie | Girls5eva | Netflix |
| 2024 (4th) | Selena Gomez | Mabel Mora | Only Murders in the Building | Hulu |
