= Astra TV Award for Best Actress in a Broadcast Network or Cable Comedy Series =

Award presented by the Hollywood Creative Alliance

Astra Award for Best Actress in a Broadcast Network or Cable Comedy Series
- Presented by: Hollywood Creative Alliance
- First award: 2021
- Currently held by: Quinta Brunson, Abbott Elementary (2024)

The Astra Award for Best Actress in a Broadcast Network or Cable Comedy Series is an annual award presented by the Hollywood Creative Alliance to honor the best leading performance by an actress on a comedy television series on broadcast or cable network. It has been given since its inaugural edition.

== Winners and nominees ==
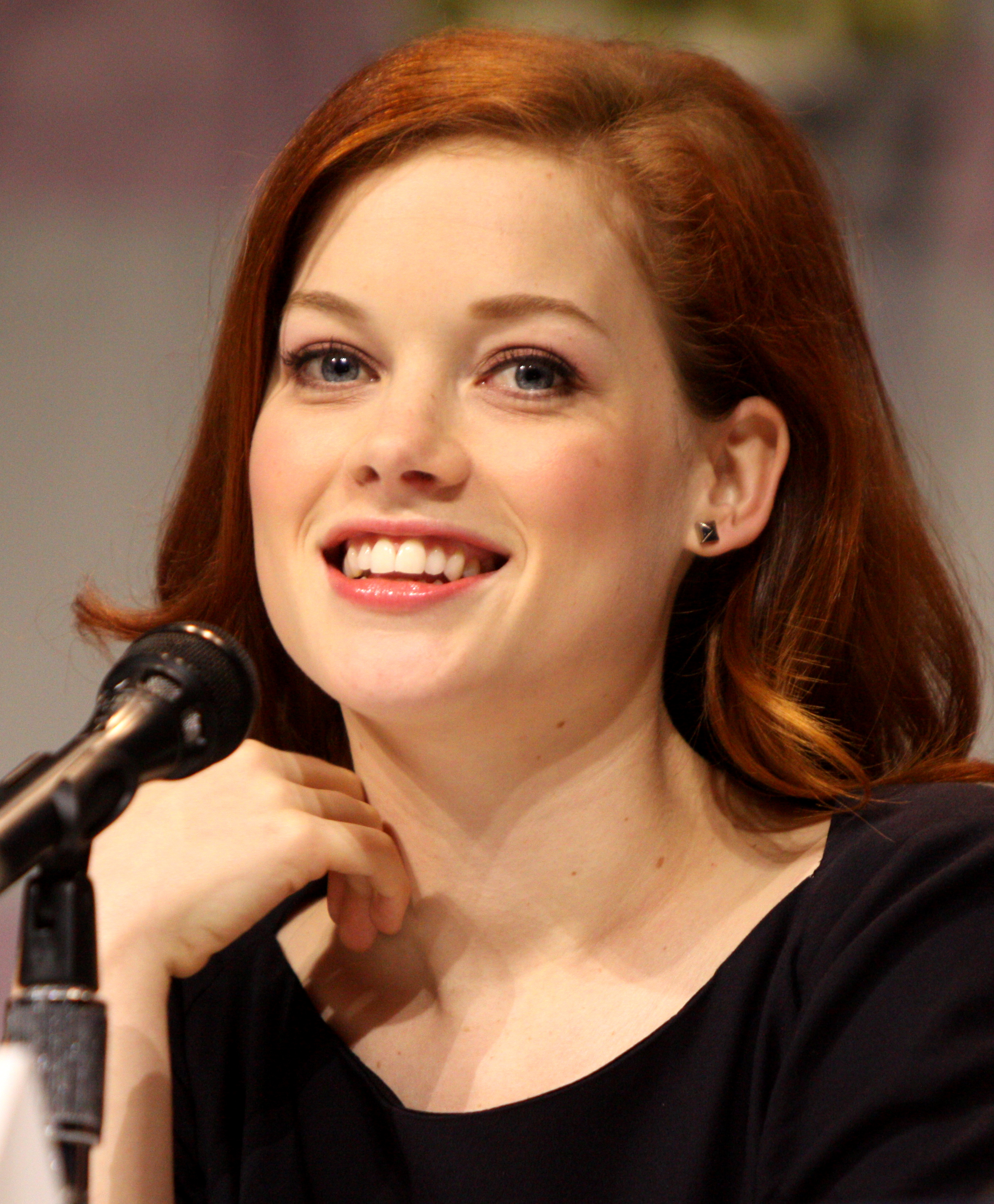
Jane Levy, 2021 winner

Quinta Brunson, 2022, 2023 and 2024 winner

Winners are listed first in colored row and highlighted in boldface, followed by other nominees.

Year	Actor	Role	Program	Network
2021 (1st)
2021 (1st)	**Jane Levy**	**Zoey Clarke**	**Zoey's Extraordinary Playlist**	**NBC**
2021 (1st)	Daisy Haggard	Ally Grant	Breeders	FX
2021 (1st)	Robin Thede	Various Characters	A Black Lady Sketch Show	HBO
2021 (1st)	Stacey Leilua	Ata Johnson	Young Rock	NBC
2021 (1st)	Tracee Ellis Ross	Dr. Rainbow "Bow" Johnson	Black-ish	ABC
2022 (2nd)
2022 (2nd)	**Quinta Brunson**	**Janine Teagues**	**Abbott Elementary**	**ABC**
2022 (2nd)	Bridget Everett	Sam	Somebody Somewhere	HBO
2022 (2nd)	Issa Rae	Issa Dee	Insecure	HBO
2022 (2nd)	Jasmine Cephas Jones	Ashley Rose	Blindspotting	Starz
2022 (2nd)	Natasia Demetriou	Nadja of Antipaxos	What We Do in the Shadows	FX
2022 (2nd)	Pamela Adlon	Sam Fox	Better Things	FX
2022 (2nd)	Rose McIver	Samantha "Sam" Arondekar	Ghosts	CBS
2022 (2nd)	Tracee Ellis Ross	Dr. Rainbow "Bow" Johnson	Black-ish	ABC
2023 (3rd)
2023 (3rd)	**Quinta Brunson**	**Janine Teagues**	**Abbott Elementary**	**ABC**
2023 (3rd)	Gina Rodriguez	Nell Serrano	Not Dead Yet	ABC
2023 (3rd)	Jasmine Cephas Jones	Ashley Rose	Blindspotting	Starz
2023 (3rd)	Marcia Gay Harden	Margaret Wright	So Help Me Todd	CBS
2023 (3rd)	Natasia Demetriou	Nadja of Antipaxos	What We Do in the Shadows	FX
2023 (3rd)	Robin Thede	Various Characters	A Black Lady Sketch Show	HBO
2023 (3rd)	Rose McIver	Samantha "Sam" Arondekar	Ghosts	CBS
2023 (3rd)	Sofia Black-D'Elia	Samantha Fink	Single Drunk Female	Freeform
2024 (4th)
2024 (4th)	**Quinta Brunson**	**Janine Teagues**	**Abbott Elementary**	**ABC**
2024 (4th)	Gina Rodriguez	Nell Serrano	Not Dead Yet	ABC
2024 (4th)	Kaitlin Olson	Dee Reynolds	It's Always Sunny in Philadelphia	FX
2024 (4th)	Marcia Gay Harden	Margaret Wright	So Help Me Todd	CBS
2024 (4th)	Natasia Demetriou	Nadja of Antipaxos	What We Do in the Shadows	FX
2024 (4th)	Rose McIver	Samantha "Sam" Arondekar	Ghosts	CBS
2024 (4th)	Sara Tomko	Asta Twelvetrees	Resident Alien	Syfy
2024 (4th)	Tichina Arnold	Tina Butler	The Neighborhood	CBS
