= Astra TV Award for Best Actor in a Streaming Comedy Series =

Award presented by the Hollywood Creative Alliance

Astra Award for Best Actor in a Streaming Comedy Series
- Presented by: Hollywood Creative Alliance
- First award: 2021
- Currently held by: Jeremy Allen White, The Bear (2024)

The Astra Award for Best Actor in a Streaming Comedy Series is an annual award presented by the Hollywood Creative Alliance to honor the best leading performance by an actor on a comedy television series on streaming service. It has been given since its inaugural edition.

== Winners and nominees ==
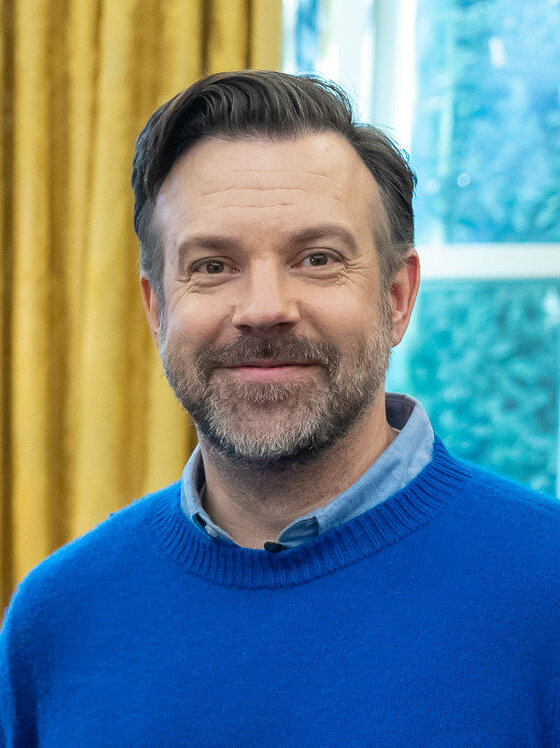
Jason Sudeikis, 2021 winner

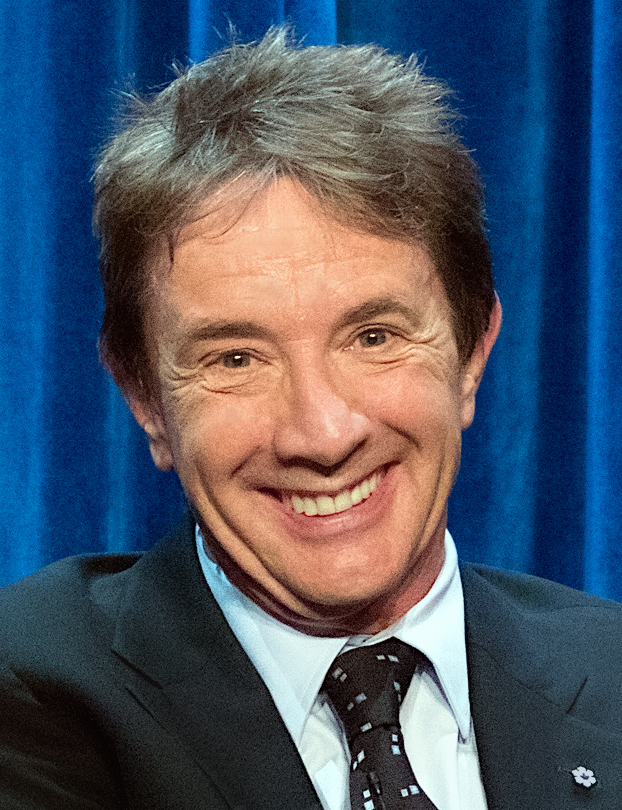
Martin Short, 2022 winner

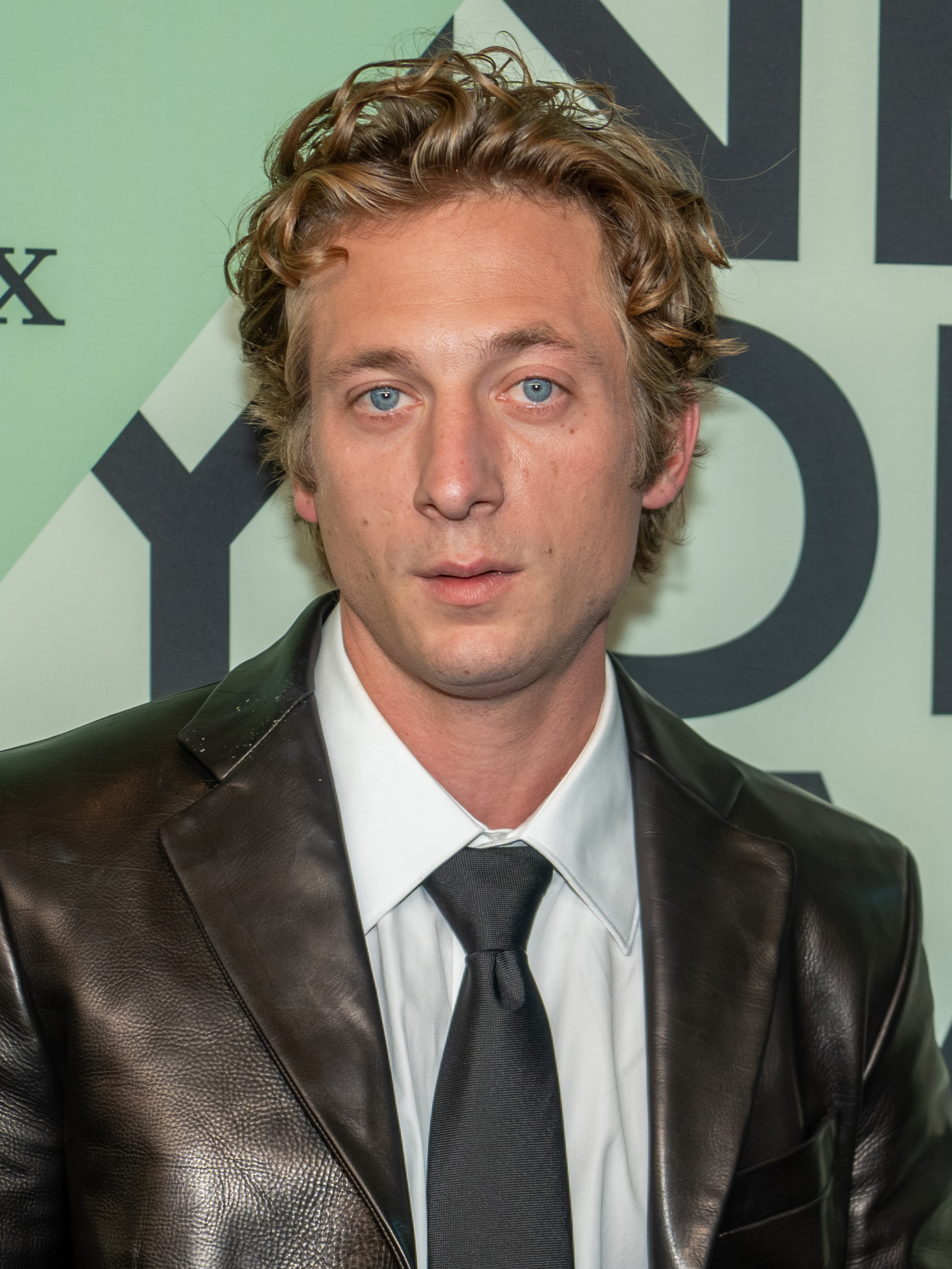
Jeremy Allen White, 2023 and 2024 winner

Winners are listed first in colored row and highlighted in boldface, followed by other nominees.

| Year | Actor | Role | Program | Network |
|---|---|---|---|---|
2021 (1st)
| 2021 (1st) | **Jason Sudeikis** | **Ted Lasso** | **Ted Lasso** | **Apple TV+** |
| 2021 (1st) | Ed Helms | Nathan Rutherford | Rutherford Falls | Peacock |
| 2021 (1st) | Michael Douglas | Sandy Kominsky | The Kominsky Method | Netflix |
| 2021 (1st) | Rob McElhenney | Ian Grimm | Mythic Quest | Apple TV+ |
| 2021 (1st) | Tom Ellis | Lucifer Morningstar | Lucifer | Netflix |
2022 (2nd)
| 2022 (2nd) | **Martin Short** | **Oliver Putnam** | **Only Murders in the Building** | **Hulu** |
| 2022 (2nd) | Jason Sudeikis | Ted Lasso | Ted Lasso | Apple TV+ |
| 2022 (2nd) | John Cena | Christopher Smith / Peacemaker | Peacemaker | HBO Max |
| 2022 (2nd) | Keegan-Michael Key | Josh Skinner | Schmigadoon! | Apple TV+ |
| 2022 (2nd) | Nicholas Hoult | Peter III of Russia | The Great | Hulu |
| 2022 (2nd) | Rhys Darby | Stede Bonnet | Our Flag Means Death | HBO Max |
| 2022 (2nd) | Sam Richardson | Aniq | The Afterparty | Apple TV+ |
| 2022 (2nd) | Steve Martin | Charles-Haden Savage | Only Murders in the Building | Hulu |
2023 (3rd)
| 2023 (3rd) | **Jeremy Allen White** | **Carmen "Carmy" Berzatto** | **The Bear** | **FX on Hulu** |
| 2023 (3rd) | Jason Segel | Jimmy Laird | Shrinking | Apple TV+ |
| 2023 (3rd) | Jason Sudeikis | Ted Lasso | Ted Lasso | Apple TV+ |
| 2023 (3rd) | Keegan-Michael Key | Reed Sterling | Reboot | Hulu |
| 2023 (3rd) | Martin Short | Oliver Putnam | Only Murders in the Building | Hulu |
| 2023 (3rd) | Nicholas Hoult | Peter III of Russia | The Great | Hulu |
| 2023 (3rd) | Steve Martin | Charles-Haden Savage | Only Murders in the Building | Hulu |
| 2023 (3rd) | Sylvester Stallone | Dwight "The General" Manfredi | Tulsa King | Paramount+ |
2024 (4th)
| 2024 (4th) | **Jeremy Allen White** | **Carmen "Carmy" Berzatto** | **The Bear** | **FX on Hulu** |
| 2024 (4th) | David Tennant | Crowley | Good Omens | Prime Video |
| 2024 (4th) | Jharrel Jerome | Cootie | I'm a Virgo | Prime Video |
| 2024 (4th) | Martin Short | Oliver Putnam | Only Murders in the Building | Hulu |
| 2024 (4th) | Michael Sheen | Aziraphale | Good Omens | Prime Video |
| 2024 (4th) | Rhys Darby | Stede Bonnet | Our Flag Means Death | Max |
| 2024 (4th) | Steve Martin | Charles-Haden Savage | Only Murders in the Building | Hulu |
| 2024 (4th) | Theo James | Edward "Eddie" Horniman | The Gentlemen | Netflix |
