= Young Rock =

American television sitcom (2021–2023)

- Season 1 episode 1 title card showing Adrian Groulx as a young Dwayne Johnson
- Genre: Sitcom
- Created by: Dwayne Johnson; Jeff Chiang; Nahnatchka Khan
- Starring: Dwayne Johnson; Joseph Lee Anderson; Stacey Leilua; Ana Tuisila; Adrian Groulx; Bradley Constant; Uli Latukefu; Matthew Willig
- Narrated by: Dwayne Johnson
- Composer: Nathan Matthew David
- Country of origin: United States
- Original language: English
- No. of seasons: 3
- No. of episodes: 37

Production
- Executive producers: Brian Gewirtz; Nahnatchka Khan; Dwayne Johnson; Hiram Garcia; Dany Garcia; Jeff Chiang; Jennifer Carreras
- Cinematography: Martin McGrath
- Camera setup: Single-camera
- Running time: 22–24 minutes
- Production companies: Grit & Superstition; Seven Bucks Productions; Fierce Baby Productions; Universal Television

Original release
- Network: NBC
- Release: February 16, 2021 – February 24, 2023

Young Rock is an American television sitcom based upon the life of professional wrestler and actor Dwayne Johnson, also known by his ring name "The Rock". The series was created by Johnson, Jeff Chiang and Nahnatchka Khan. It aired on NBC from February 16, 2021, to February 24, 2023. In April 2021, the series was renewed for a second season. A holiday special episode aired on December 15, 2021, and the second season premiered on March 15, 2022. In May 2022, the series was renewed for a third season, which premiered on November 4, 2022. The series was cancelled in June 2023.

== Premise ==
The sitcom is organized around a frame story set in the early 2030s, beginning with Johnson running for office in the 2032 United States presidential election. Each episode involves Johnson participating in an interview or other conversation which leads him to flashback to a story from one of three periods of Johnson's life, with occasional episodes where all three periods are shown. In the first season, Johnson is depicted as a ten-year-old in Hawaii; as a high school student in Pennsylvania; and as a college student and football player at the University of Miami.

== Cast and characters ==
=== Main ===
- Dwayne Johnson as himself in scenes set in the future
  - Adrian Groulx as 10- to 14-year-old Dwayne, usually called Dewey by family
  - Bradley Constant as 15- to 17-year-old Dwayne
  - Uli Latukefu as 18- to 26-year-old Dwayne
- Joseph Lee Anderson as Rocky Johnson, Dwayne's father
- Stacey Leilua as Ata Johnson, Dwayne's mother
- Ana Tuisila as Lia Maivia, Dwayne's grandmother, Ata's mother
  - Tuisila also plays the 1960's version of Lia
- Matthew Willig as André the Giant (season 2–3; recurring season 1)

=== Recurring ===
==== 1982 ====
(Note: All the wrestling recurring characters who appear in 1982 also appear in 1987 and the 1990s)

- Brett Azar as The Iron Sheik
- Nate Jackson as Junkyard Dog
- Kevin Makely as Randy Savage
- Fasitua Amosa and John Tui as Sika and Afa Anoa'i, better known as The Wild Samoans
- Wayne Mattei as Sgt. Slaughter
- Kiff VandenHeuvel as Pat Patterson (season 2–3)
  - Marshall Williams plays a Young Pat Patterson in the 1960s (season 3)
- Josh Thomson as Bob, Lia Maivia's assistant
- Ronny Chieng as Greg Yao (season 1), a rival promoter of Lia's who is scalping wrestlers
- Sarah Gattelleri as Miss Elizabeth (season 2)
- Dave T. Koenig as Mean Gene Okerlund (season 2)
- Antuone Torbert as Tony Atlas (season 2)
- Jacob Hadley as "Chunk"/Jeff Cohen (season 3)
- Jason Devon Jenkins as Mr. T (season 3)
- Pete Gardner as Liberace (season 3)
- Brock O'Hurn as Hulk Hogan (season 3)
- Mike Holley as Lars Anderson, a booker and wrestler for Ata's stable (season 3)

==== 1987 ====
- Lexie Duncan as Karen, teenage Rock's girlfriend
  - Duncan also plays Lisa, Karen's twin sister
- Bryan Probets as Principal Boggs
- Stephen Adams as Kevin, Teenage Rock's rival for Karen
- Grayson Waller as Ric Flair
- Jade Drane as "Rowdy" Roddy Piper (season 1)
  - Ben Vandermay plays Roddy Piper in season 3
- Adam Ray as Vince McMahon (season 2–3)
- Taj Cross as Gabe, Dwayne's best friend in high school
- Genevieve Hegney as Diane, Ata's employer
- Ryan Pinkston as Downtown Bruno (season 2–3)
- Greg Larsen as wrestler Bob Owens (season 2)

==== 1990s ====
- Arlyn Broche as Dany Garcia, Dwayne's girlfriend/wife (season 2–3)
- Mark Casamento as Coach Wally Buono (season 2)
- Michael Bemrose as Bruce Prichard (season 2)
- Mana Tatafu as Uncle King Tonga (season 2)
- Luke Hawx as Stone Cold Steve Austin (season 2–3)
- Sam Ball as Mick Foley/Mankind (season 3)
- Nicholas Bernardi as Bret "the Hitman" Hart (season 3)
- Eltony Williams as Chad Frost, a fictional wrestler (Note: In the episode, Johnson acknowledges he changed the name of the real wrestler involved in the story to protect their identity due to the situation discussed in the story. No official confirmation has ever been given of who the wrestler actually was, though it has been heavily implied to be Shawn Michaels by fans as well as close friends Kevin Nash and Sean Waltman due to legitimate issues between Michaels and Johnson.) (season 3)

==== 2032 ====
- Randall Park as a future version of himself who has retired from acting and now is the host of his own news show The Straight Line with Randall Park
- Kenny Smith as a future version of himself, now a solo sports show host, unlike Inside the NBA
- Rosario Dawson as General Monica Jackson, the VP candidate for Dwayne Johnson's presidential campaign
- Ata Johnson cameos as a future version of herself during an interview between Dwayne and Randall, and in the season 1 finale
- Ed Orgeron cameos as a future version of himself during an interview between Dwayne and Kenny Smith
- Chelsey Crisp as Casey, a member of Dwayne's campaign staff (season 2)
- Jenna Kanell as Jamie, the camerawoman on The Straight Line with Randall Park (season 2, episodes 4 and 11)
- Dawnn Lewis as Prime Minister Angela Honig (season 3)

=== Guest stars ===
- Jordana Beatty as Bonnie (season 1, episodes 2, 5, 8 and 11)
- Luke Hemsworth as Coach Erickson (season 1, episodes 10 and 11)
- Sean Astin as Man (1990s) who sold Dewey a mattress/Julian, an old schoolmate who 2032 Rock has a Twitter war with.
- Becky Lynch as Cyndi Lauper (season 3, episodes 1 and 12)
- Mark Ashworth as Director Lee, director of You Only Live Twice (season 3)
- Clark Duke as Brian Gewirtz (Season 3, episode 8)

==== Wrestler cameos ====
- Ivan So as Ricky "The Dragon" Steamboat (season 1, episode 6)
- Paul Paice as Captain Lou Albano (season 2, episode 2)
- Joseph D. Reitman plays Captain Lou in season 3
- Michael Strassner as Jerry Lawler (season 2)
- Patrick Cox as Crusher Yurkov (season 2)
- James Bolton as Jeff Jarrett (season 2)
- Bowie Walton as Roman Reigns (season 2, as a child)
- Marcus Molyneux as Brian Christopher (season 2)
- Cooper Matthews as Brian Lawler (season 2, as a teenager)
- Colt Cabana as The Brooklyn Brawler (season 2, episode 8)
- Brad Burroughs as Michael "P.S." Hayes (season 2)
- Richard Carwin as Bill Dundee
- Eddy Clinton as Classy Freddie Blassie (season 3)
- Benjamin Arthur as Jake "the Snake" Roberts (season 3)
- Saxon Cardenas as Ken Shamrock (season 3)
- Miles Burris as Triple H (season 3)
- Anthony Darrell as Bad News Allen (season 3)
- Darrell R. Hill as Dusty Rhodes (season 3)
- Jeff Huth as Sting (season 3)
- Dane Davenport as Jim Crockett (season 3)
- Sam Puefua as Young Peter Maivia (1960s), Dwayne's grandfather, Ata's father and Lia's husband (season 3)

== Episodes ==
Season	Episodes	Originally released	
Season	Episodes	First released	Last released
1	11	February 16, 2021	May 4, 2021
Special		December 15, 2021	
2	12	March 15, 2022	May 24, 2022
3	13	November 4, 2022	February 24, 2023

=== Season 1 (2021) ===
No. overall	No. in season	Title	Directed by	Written by	Original release date	Prod. code	U.S. viewers (millions)	Rating (18-49)
1	1	"Working the Gimmick"	Nahnatchka Khan	Jeff Chiang & Nahnatchka Khan	February 16, 2021	101	5.32	1.0
In 2032, Dwayne "The Rock" Johnson is running for President of the United States. To prove he is like the everyday American, he sits down for an interview with Randall Park, now a journalist, and begins discussing his childhood. Johnson flashbacks to his life as a young boy in Hawaii, where his famous father Rocky Johnson, a wrestler, just won a match; they later go to Rocky's mother's house to talk to the rest of the family, to the dismay of Johnson's mother. Johnson then flashbacks to his teenage years in Pennsylvania, trying to impress girls by stealing and making himself appear wealthy, while dealing with his parents struggling to make income. Johnson also reminiscences about his college years, playing for the Miami Hurricanes, but not before his father shows up to the team's gym trying to make his son look good.
2	2	"On the Road Again"	Daina Reid	Jeff Chiang & Nahnatchka Khan	February 23, 2021	106	3.61	0.8
Continuing from the previous episode, Johnson continues to talk about his past in the interview with Park. As a high schooler in 1987 Pennsylvania, Johnson is continuing to lie about his wealth to impress girls, specifically a popular girl named Karen. He asks her to go on a date to his father's wrestling match, but when they attend the match, they realize it's in the middle of a flea market with very few spectators. Despite this event being slightly embarrassing to Johnson, Karen finds this interesting and continues to date him. Meanwhile, Johnson's mom Ata hangs out with a rich client whom she cleans her house for.
3	3	"Forward, Together"	Jeffrey Walker	Jen D'Angelo	March 2, 2021	102	3.22	0.7
Talking to his campaign manager (in 2032), Johnson begins talking about how life drastically changed when his father became famous for wrestling. Flashbacking, his younger self and his family learn from his grandmother, a wrestling promoter, that she is organizing an Island-wide wrestling tournament. However, one of the booked wrestlers backs out, claiming his mother is sick, but was actually offered more money by Greg Yao, another wrestling promoter. Rocky Johnson is also offered promotion by Yao, but Rocky is afraid he'll be left behind in the changing business. Meanwhile, Johnson's mom Ata, after being encouraged to do so, decides to pursue a career in singing on reality television, starting with singing at a restaurant.
4	4	"Check Your Head"	Jeffrey Walker	Patrick Kang & Michael Levin	March 16, 2021	109	2.96	0.6
5	5	"Don't Go Breaking My Heart"	Daina Reid	Erik Durbin	March 23, 2021	107	2.90	0.6
6	6	"My Day with Andre"	Jeffrey Walker	David Smithyman	March 30, 2021	103	2.58	0.6
In a convention in 2032, Johnson announcing his running mate for vice president named General Monica Jackson. Flashbacking it to 1982, Dewey is spending a day with Andre the Giant, while Lia and Rocky prepares their plans for the huge Island Battle Royale. Andre had asking Ricky "The Dragon" Steamboat (Ivan So) and Sgt. Slaughter to battle them in the battle royale. Meanwhile, Ata is creating an original song as her quest for stardom that showed us the quirky side of the mom of the household.
7	7	"Johnson & Hopkins"	Jeffrey Walker	Erik Durbin	April 6, 2021	110	2.63	0.5
8	8	"My Baby Only Drinks the Good Stuff"	Daina Reid	Erica Oyama	April 13, 2021	108	2.78	0.6
9	9	"A Lady Named Star Search"	Jeffrey Walker	Cindy Fang	April 20, 2021	104	2.64	0.5
In 2032, Johnson and rival candidate senator Brayden Taft (Michael Torpey) had a debate. Flashbacking to 1982, Ata wanted to audition for Star Search. Rocky takes an unorthodox approach to helping Dewey deal with some bullies after Kenny (P.J. Holt) cut the part of the surfboard. Lia had a conflict with rival wrestling promoter Greg Yao.
10	10	"Good vs. Great"	Jeffrey Walker	Erica Oyama	April 27, 2021	111	2.40	0.5
11	11	"Election Day"	Jeffrey Walker	Jeff Chiang & Nahnatchka Khan	May 4, 2021	105	2.36	0.5
On Election Day (in 2032), Johnson leads Taft by 4 point margin to become the next president. Johnson talks to Park ahead of his acceptance speech. Flashbacking, Dewey becomes president of the Rocky Johnson Fan Club, Rocky says that her mother's Star Search audition is pretty famous. Ata visits Greg Yao's office to pay the price until the end of the day. Rocky and Dewey meet their parents back home to Hawaii, and they meet Randy Savage. Lia is arrested for extortion after her feud with Greg. Meanwhile, in 1988, Dewey accepts his calls from coaches that he wanted to accept him in the University of Georgia, the University of Notre Dame or the University of Southern California. Dewey accepts the call from the University of Miami to become a football player on the road to his NFL stardom. Then in 1995, in Tampa, Dewey prepares his shot at the NFL draft while he is in college. He watches the draft announcing Warren Sapp as a member of the Tampa Bay Buccaneers, but he did not get called. Dewey instead wants to play for the Calgary Stampeders while in the cold. Johnson completes his interview with Park and they met the future version of Lia to attend their press conference.

=== Special (2021) ===
No. overall	Title	Directed by	Written by	Original release date	Prod. code	U.S. viewers (millions)	Rating (18-49)
12	"A Christmas Peril"	Nahnatchka Khan	Jen D'Angelo	December 15, 2021	202	3.06	0.5

=== Season 2 (2022) ===
No. overall	No. in season	Title	Directed by	Written by	Original release date	Prod. code	U.S. viewers (millions)	Rating (18-49)
13	1	"Unprecedented Fatherhood"	Nahnatchka Khan	Jeff Chiang & Nahnatchka Khan	March 8, 2022	201	2.55	0.4
14	2	"Seven Bucks"	Jeffrey Walker	Erik Durbin	March 15, 2022	203	2.32	0.4
15	3	"In Your Blood"	Jeffrey Walker	Cindy Fang	March 22, 2022	205	2.07	0.3
16	4	"In the Dark"	Cherie Nowlan	Eric Ziobrowski	March 29, 2022	208	2.02	0.3
17	5	"What Business?"	Jeffrey Walker	Patrick Kang & Michael Levin	April 5, 2022	204	2.30	0.4
18	6	"Kiss and Release"	Jeffrey Walker	David Smithyman	April 12, 2022	206	1.92	0.3
19	7	"An Understanding"	Cherie Nowlan	Jen D'Angelo	April 19, 2022	209	2.14	0.4
20	8	"Corpus Christi"	Jeffrey Walker	Hiram Garcia & Brian Gewirtz & Dwayne Johnson	April 26, 2022	211	2.14	0.3
21	9	"Backyard Brawl-B-Q"	Jeffrey Walker	Laura McCreary	May 3, 2022	207	1.88	0.4
22	10	"Rocky's Code"	Cherie Nowlan	Erik Durbin	May 10, 2022	210	1.87	0.4
23	11	"You Gotta Get Down to Get Up"	Jeffrey Walker	Patrick Kang & Michael Levin	May 17, 2022	212	2.34	0.4
Note: In the Eastern and Central time zones, due to news coverage of the Robb Elementary School shooting, this episode was not broadcast, though it was rebroadcast on May 29, 2022, in its entirety.
24	12	"Let the People Decide"	Jeffrey Walker	Cindy Fang & David Smithyman	May 24, 2022	213	2.36	0.5
Note: In the Eastern and Central time zones, due to preemption for a speech from President Biden, this episode was joined in progress. It was also rebroadcast on May 29, 2022, in its entirety.

=== Season 3 (2022–23) ===
No. overall	No. in season	Title	Directed by	Written by	Original release date	Prod. code	U.S. viewers (millions)	Rating (18-49)
25	1	"The People Need You"	Nahnatchka Khan	Jeff Chiang & Nahnatchka Khan	November 4, 2022	301	1.81	0.3
26	2	"Rocky Sucks"	Christine Gernon	Laura McCreary	November 11, 2022	302	1.43	0.2
27	3	"On the Ropes"	Christine Gernon	David Smithyman	November 18, 2022	303	1.36	0.3
28	4	"Night of the Chi-Chi's"	Chris Koch	Cindy Fang	December 2, 2022	304	1.42	0.3
29	5	"Five Days"	Angela Tortu	Eric Ziobrowski	December 9, 2022	305	1.32	0.3
30	6	"Dwanta Claus"	Angela Tortu	Jen D'Angelo	December 16, 2022	306	1.53	0.3
31	7	"World Pacific Wrestling"	David Katzenberg	Patrick Kang & Michael Levin	January 6, 2023	307	1.31	0.2
32	8	"Going Heavy"	Keith Powell	Jeff Chlebus & Sara Ghaffar	January 13, 2023	308	1.48	0.3
33	9	"It All Goes Back to Childhood"	Erica Oyama	David Smithyman	January 20, 2023	309	1.46	0.3
34	10	"Once Upon a Time In..."	Laura McCreary	Cindy Fang	February 3, 2023	310	1.26	0.2
35	11	"Know Your Role"	Nahnatchka Khan	Eric Ziobrowski	February 10, 2023	311	1.36	0.2
36	12	"Chest to Chest"	Jeff Chiang	Patrick Kang & Michael Levin	February 17, 2023	312	1.38	0.2
37	13	"False Ceilings"	Numa Perrier	Erik Durbin	February 24, 2023	313	1.48	0.3

== Production ==
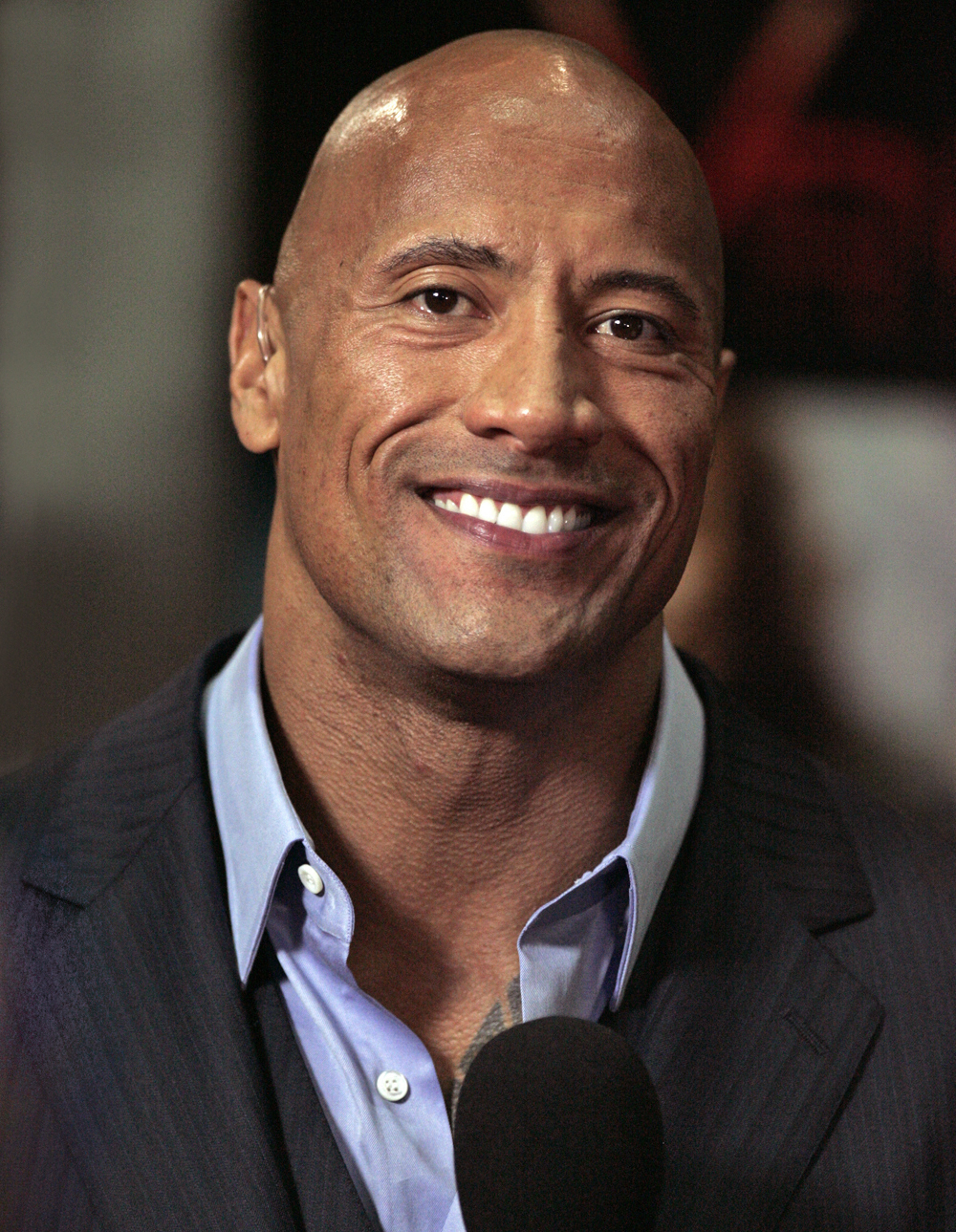
Dwayne Johnson, who plays himself and is also an executive producer

=== Development ===
On January 11, 2020, NBC gave a straight-to-series order to Young Rock, a comedy series based on Dwayne Johnson's early life created by Johnson and Nahnatchka Khan and produce the series with Jeff Chiang, Dany Garcia, Jennifer Carreras, Hiram Garcia, and Brian Gewirtz with Khan and Chiang writing the pilot. In November 2020, production on the series commenced in Australia. On January 15, 2021, it was announced that the series would premiere on February 16, 2021. On April 30, 2021, NBC renewed the series for a second season, again filmed in Australia. A holiday special episode titled as "A Christmas Peril" aired on December 15, 2021, ahead of the second season premiere on March 15, 2022. On May 12, 2022, NBC renewed the series for a third season, which was filmed in Memphis, Tennessee. The third season premiered on November 4, 2022, following Lopez vs Lopez as a part of NBC's Friday Comedy Hour block. On June 9, 2023, NBC canceled the series after three seasons.

=== Casting ===
Three actors were cast to play Johnson at three ages from his youth. On September 30, 2020, Johnson revealed that Bradley Constant was cast as 15-year-old Johnson, Uli Latukefu as 18–20-year-old Johnson, Adrian Groulx as 10-year-old Johnson, Stacey Leilua as Johnson's mother, Ata Johnson, Joseph Lee Anderson as Johnson's father, Rocky Johnson, and Ana Tuisila as Johnson's grandmother, Lia Maivia. On August 3, 2021, Matthew Willig was promoted to series regular for the second season.

== Release ==
=== Marketing ===
During the 2020 Macy's Thanksgiving Day Parade, an inflatable CGI float featuring Dwayne Johnson in his 20s was unveiled in promotion of the television show.

=== Home media ===
Universal Pictures Home Entertainment released the complete first season of Young Rock on DVD and manufacture-on-demand Blu-ray on March 29, 2022, with its second season was released on DVD and Blu-ray also as manufacture-on-demand titles on November 8, seven months after the first season's home release.

== Reception ==
=== Critical response ===
The series received generally positive reviews from critics throughout its run. On Rotten Tomatoes, the first season has a rating of 90% based on 31 reviews, with an average rating of 7.70/10. The website's critical consensus reads, "Anchored by a winsome ensemble, Young Rock is an endearing peek behind the curtain of both Dwayne Johnson's childhood and the wild world of wrestling." On Metacritic, it has a weighted average score of 66 out of 100, based on 18 critics, indicating "generally favorable reviews". The series has been criticized by Jim Cornette for its historical inaccuracy and unflattering portrayal of several wrestlers.

=== Ratings ===
==== Overall ====
Viewership and ratings per season of Young Rock
Season	Timeslot (ET)	Episodes	First aired		Last aired		TV season	Viewership rank	Avg. viewers (millions)
Season	Timeslot (ET)	Episodes	Date	Viewers (millions)	Date	Viewers (millions)	TV season	Viewership rank	Avg. viewers (millions)
1	Tuesday 8:00 p.m.	11	February 16, 2021	5.32	May 4, 2021	2.36	2020–21	80	3.85
2	Tuesday 8:00 p.m. (1–11); Tuesday 8:30 p.m. (12)	12	March 15, 2022	2.55	May 24, 2022	2.36	2021–22	91	3.62
3	Friday 8:30 p.m.	13	November 4, 2022	1.81	February 24, 2023	1.48	2022–23	102	1.00

==== Season 1 ====
Viewership and ratings per episode of Young Rock
No.	Title	Air date	Rating (18–49)	Viewers (millions)	DVR (18–49)	DVR viewers (millions)	Total (18–49)	Total viewers (millions)
1	"Working the Gimmick"	February 16, 2021	1.0	5.32	0.4	1.38	1.4	6.70
2	"On the Road Again"	February 23, 2021	0.8	3.61	0.3	1.07	1.1	4.68
3	"Forward, Together"	March 2, 2021	0.7	3.22	0.3	0.96	1.0	4.19
4	"Check Your Head"	March 16, 2021	0.6	2.96	—N/a	—N/a	—N/a	—N/a
5	"Don't Go Breaking My Heart"	March 23, 2021	0.6	2.90	—N/a	—N/a	—N/a	—N/a
6	"My Day With Andre"	March 30, 2021	0.6	2.58	—N/a	—N/a	—N/a	—N/a
7	"Johnson & Hopkins"	April 6, 2021	0.5	2.63	0.2	0.66	0.7	3.29
8	"My Baby Only Drinks the Good Stuff"	April 13, 2021	0.6	2.78	0.2	0.67	0.8	3.45
9	"A Lady Named Star Search"	April 20, 2021	0.5	2.64	0.3	0.67	0.8	3.31
10	"Good vs. Great"	April 27, 2021	0.5	2.40	0.2	0.61	0.7	3.00
11	"Election Day"	May 4, 2021	0.5	2.36	0.2	0.56	0.7	2.92

==== Special ====
Viewership and ratings per episode of Young Rock
No.	Title	Air date	Rating (18–49)	Viewers (millions)
1	"A Christmas Peril"	December 15, 2021	0.5	3.06

==== Season 2 ====
Viewership and ratings per episode of Young Rock
No.	Title	Air date	Rating (18–49)	Viewers (millions)
1	"Unprecedented Fatherhood"	March 15, 2022	0.4	2.55
2	"Seven Bucks"	March 22, 2022	0.4	2.32
3	"In Your Blood"	March 29, 2022	0.3	2.07
4	"In the Dark"	April 5, 2022	0.3	2.02
5	"What Business?"	April 12, 2022	0.4	2.30
6	"Kiss and Release"	April 19, 2022	0.3	1.92
7	"An Understanding"	April 26, 2022	0.4	2.14
8	"Corpus Christi"	May 3, 2022	0.3	2.14
9	"Backyard Brawl-B-Q"	May 10, 2022	0.4	1.88
10	"Rocky's Code"	May 17, 2022	0.4	1.87
11	"You Gotta Get Down to Get Up"	May 24, 2022	0.2	7.53
12	"Let the People Decide"	May 24, 2022	0.2	6.59

==== Season 3 ====
Viewership and ratings per episode of Young Rock
No.	Title	Air date	Rating (18–49)	Viewers (millions)	DVR (18–49)	DVR viewers (millions)	Total (18–49)	Total viewers (millions)
1	"The People Need You"	November 4, 2022	0.3	1.81	0.1	0.58	0.4	2.39
2	"Rocky Sucks"	November 11, 2022	0.2	1.43	0.2	0.62	0.4	2.05
3	"On the Ropes"	November 18, 2022	0.3	1.36	TBD	TBD	TBD	TBD
4	"Night of the Chi-Chi's"	December 2, 2022	0.3	1.42	TBD	TBD	TBD	TBD
5	"Five Days"	December 9, 2022	0.3	1.32	TBD	TBD	TBD	TBD
6	"Dwanta Claus"	December 16, 2022	0.3	1.53	TBD	TBD	TBD	TBD
7	"World Pacific Wrestling"	January 6, 2023	0.2	1.31	0.1	0.48	0.4	1.79
8	"Going Heavy"	January 13, 2023	0.3	1.48	0.2	0.55	0.4	2.03
9	"It All Goes Back to Childhood"	January 20, 2023	0.3	1.46	0.1	0.50	0.4	1.95
10	"Once Upon a Time In..."	February 3, 2023	0.2	1.26	TBD	TBD	TBD	TBD
11	"Know Your Role"	February 10, 2023	0.2	1.36	TBD	TBD	TBD	TBD
12	"Chest to Chest"	February 17, 2023	0.2	1.38	TBD	TBD	TBD	TBD
13	"False Ceilings"	February 24, 2023	0.3	1.48	TBD	TBD	TBD	TBD

=== Accolades ===
The series was one of 101 out of the 200 most-popular scripted television series that received the ReFrame Stamp for the years 2020 to 2021. The stamp is awarded by the gender equity coalition ReFrame and industry database IMDbPro for film and television projects that are proven to have gender-balanced hiring, with stamps being awarded to projects that hire women, especially women of color, in four out of eight key roles for their production.

Accolades received by Young Rock
Award	Year	Category	Recipient	Result	Ref.
Hollywood Critics Association TV Awards	2021	Best Broadcast Network Series, Comedy	Young Rock	Won	
Hollywood Critics Association TV Awards	2021	Best Actor in a Broadcast Network or Cable Series, Comedy	Joseph Lee Anderson	Nominated	
Hollywood Critics Association TV Awards	2021	Best Actress in a Broadcast Network or Cable Series, Comedy	Stacey Leilua	Nominated	
Hollywood Critics Association TV Awards	2021	Best Supporting Actor in a Broadcast Network or Cable Series, Comedy	Dwayne Johnson	Nominated	
Hollywood Critics Association TV Awards	2021	Best Supporting Actress in a Broadcast Network or Cable Series, Comedy	Ana Tuisila	Nominated	
Hollywood Critics Association TV Awards	2022	Best Broadcast Network Series, Comedy	Young Rock	Nominated	
Nickelodeon Kids' Choice Awards	2023	Favorite Family TV Show	Young Rock	Nominated	
People's Choice Awards	2021	Comedy Show of 2022	Young Rock	Nominated	
People's Choice Awards	2021	Male TV Star of 2022	Dwayne Johnson	Nominated	
People's Choice Awards	2021	Comedy TV Star of 2022	Dwayne Johnson	Nominated	
People's Choice Awards	2022	Comedy Show of 2022	Young Rock	Nominated	
People's Choice Awards	2022	Male TV Star of 2022	Dwayne Johnson	Nominated	
People's Choice Awards	2022	Comedy TV Star of 2022	Dwayne Johnson	Nominated	
