= Astra TV Award for Best Streaming Comedy Series =

Award presented by the Hollywood Creative Alliance

Astra Award for Best Streaming Comedy Series
- Awarded for: Outstanding comedy series on streaming television
- Country: United States
- Presented by: Hollywood Creative Alliance
- First award: 2021
- Currently held by: Hacks (2024)

The Astra Award for Best Streaming Comedy Series is an annual award presented by the Hollywood Creative Alliance to honor the best comedy television series on streaming television. It has been given since its inaugural edition.

== Winners and nominations ==
Winners are listed first in colored row and highlighted in boldface, followed by other nominees.

Year	Program	Network
2021 (1st)
2021 (1st)	**Ted Lasso**	**Apple TV+**
2021 (1st)	Cobra Kai	Netflix
2021 (1st)	The Flight Attendant	HBO Max
2021 (1st)	Girls5eva	Peacock
2021 (1st)	Hacks	HBO Max
2021 (1st)	Mythic Quest	Apple TV+
2022 (2nd)
2022 (2nd)	**Ted Lasso**	**Apple TV+**
2022 (2nd)	The Afterparty	Apple TV+
2022 (2nd)	Dickinson	Apple TV+
2022 (2nd)	Hacks	HBO Max
2022 (2nd)	The Marvelous Mrs. Maisel	Prime Video
2022 (2nd)	Only Murders in the Building	Hulu
2022 (2nd)	Reservation Dogs	FX on Hulu
2022 (2nd)	Schmigadoon!	Apple TV+
2023 (3rd)
2023 (3rd)	**The Marvelous Mrs. Maisel**	**Prime Video**
2023 (3rd)	The Bear	FX on Hulu
2023 (3rd)	Grease: Rise of the Pink Ladies	Paramount+
2023 (3rd)	Jury Duty	Freevee
2023 (3rd)	Only Murders in the Building	Hulu
2023 (3rd)	Poker Face	Peacock
2023 (3rd)	Shrinking	Apple TV+
2023 (3rd)	Ted Lasso	Apple TV+
2023 (3rd)	Tulsa King	Paramount+
2023 (3rd)	Wednesday	Netflix
2024 (4th)
2024 (4th)	**Hacks**	**Max**
2024 (4th)	The Bear	FX on Hulu
2024 (4th)	Gen V	Prime Video
2024 (4th)	The Gentlemen	Netflix
2024 (4th)	Girls5eva	Netflix
2024 (4th)	Loot	Apple TV+
2024 (4th)	Only Murders in the Building	Hulu
2024 (4th)	Palm Royale	Apple TV+
2024 (4th)	Reservation Dogs	FX on Hulu
2024 (4th)	Ted	Peacock
