= Stacey Leilua =

New Zealand actress and producer

- Born: 1982 (age 42–43); Auckland, New Zealand
- Education: Unitec Institute of Technology (BA)
- Occupations: Actress; producer
- Known for: Young Rock (2021–2023)
- Children: 1

Stacey Leilua (born 1982) is a New Zealand actress and producer. Since the early 2000s she has regularly acted in Pasifika theatre in New Zealand and was a founding member of the Kila Kokonut Krew. She played Ata Johnson, the mother of Dwayne Johnson, in the comedy show Young Rock from 2021 to 2023.

== Life and career ==
Leilua was born in Auckland in 1982, and is of Samoan, Māori and Pākehā (New Zealand European) descent. She attended Unitec Institute of Technology where she obtained a bachelor's degree in performing and screen arts.

She was a founding member, and later company director, of Kila Kokonut Krew, a Pasifika performing arts company, in the early 2000s, and performed in and produced plays with other members on numerous occasions over the next decade. In 2013, she was the co-producer of Kila Kokonut Krew musical The Factory, about a Samoan family who arrive in New Zealand in 1974. It was described by Radio New Zealand as "New Zealand's first-ever Pacific musical". The show headlined the 2013 Auckland Arts Festival, featured at the 2014 Edinburgh Festival Fringe, and was subsequently adapted into a 20-part webseries, in which Leilua also acted.

From 2016 to 2020, she was part of the ensemble cast for Wild Dogs Under My Skirt, a show based on Tusiata Avia's 2002 one-woman show and 2004 poetry collection, performed at the Māngere Arts Centre in 2016 and as part of the 2018 New Zealand Festival of the Arts and the 2019 Auckland Arts Festival. Leilua played the part of Avia. A 2016 review in The New Zealand Herald said Leilua "captures the ironic, mocking persona of the poet who lives between two worlds as she carries the down-to-earth sensuality of her Pacific roots on an international odyssey". The show was performed for a 2-week run at the SoHo Playhouse in New York City in 2020, and won The Fringe Encore Series 2019 Outstanding Production of the Year.

From 2021 to 2023, Leilua played the mother of Dwayne Johnson, Ata, in the comedy show Young Rock. A reviewer for the San Francisco Chronicle described her as "quite magnetic to watch", and said that "her role, the least showy, is the most compelling surprise". She was nominated for the award for Best Actress in a Broadcast Network or Cable Series, Comedy, at the 1st Hollywood Critics Association TV Awards.

== Filmography ==
=== Film ===
Year	Title	Role	Notes	Ref.
2010	To'ona'i	Ruth	Short film	
2011	Love Birds	Mom #3		
2012	Tatau	Sina	Short film	

=== Television ===
Year	Title	Role	Notes	Ref.
2003	Good Hands – Lima Lelei	Juddy		
2011	Hōmai te Pakipaki	Presenter	Aired on Māori Television	
2021–2023	Young Rock	Ata Johnson		
