= Astra TV Award for Best Streaming Drama Series =

Award presented by the Hollywood Creative Alliance

Astra Award for Best Streaming Drama Series
- Awarded for: Outstanding drama series on streaming television
- Country: United States
- Presented by: Hollywood Creative Alliance
- First award: 2021
- Currently held by: Shōgun (2024)

The Astra Award for Best Streaming Drama Series is an annual award presented by the Hollywood Creative Alliance to honor the best drama television series on streaming television. It has been given since its inaugural edition.

== Winners and nominations ==
Winners are listed first in colored row and highlighted in boldface, followed by other nominees.

Year	Program	Network
2021 (1st)
2021 (1st)	**The Mandalorian**	**Disney+**
2021 (1st)	The Boys	Prime Video
2021 (1st)	Bridgerton	Netflix
2021 (1st)	The Crown	Netflix
2021 (1st)	The Handmaid's Tale	Hulu
2021 (1st)	Servant	Apple TV+
2022 (2nd)
2022 (2nd)	**Severance**	**Apple TV+**
2022 (2nd)	Loki	Disney+
2022 (2nd)	The Morning Show	Apple TV+
2022 (2nd)	Ozark	Netflix
2022 (2nd)	Pachinko	Apple TV+
2022 (2nd)	Squid Game	Netflix
2022 (2nd)	Star Trek: Strange New Worlds	Paramount+
2022 (2nd)	Stranger Things	Netflix
2023 (3rd)
2023 (3rd)	**The Boys**	**Prime Video**
2023 (3rd)	1923	Paramount+
2023 (3rd)	Andor	Disney+
2023 (3rd)	Bad Sisters	Apple TV+
2023 (3rd)	The Crown	Netflix
2023 (3rd)	The Diplomat	Netflix
2023 (3rd)	The Handmaid's Tale	Hulu
2023 (3rd)	The Mandalorian	Disney+
2023 (3rd)	Queen Charlotte: A Bridgerton Story	Netflix
2023 (3rd)	Star Trek: Picard	Paramount+
2024 (4th)
2024 (4th)	**Shōgun**	**FX on Hulu**
2024 (4th)	3 Body Problem	Netflix
2024 (4th)	Ahsoka	Disney+
2024 (4th)	The Crown	Netflix
2024 (4th)	Fallout	Prime Video
2024 (4th)	Loki	Disney+
2024 (4th)	Monarch: Legacy of Monsters	Apple TV+
2024 (4th)	The Morning Show	Apple TV+
2024 (4th)	Mr. & Mrs. Smith	Prime Video
2024 (4th)	Silo	Apple TV+
