= 1st Hollywood Critics Association TV Awards =

2021 American television programming awards

- Date: August 29, 2021
- Site: Virtual presentation via YouTube
- Most wins: Ted Lasso (4)
- Most nominations: Ted Lasso (8)
- Website: hollywoodcriticsassociation.com

Television/radio coverage
- Network: YouTube

The 1st Hollywood Critics Association TV Awards, presented by the Hollywood Critics Association, took place through a virtual ceremony on YouTube on August 29, 2021. However, due to the rising number of COVID-19 cases in Los Angeles County and the US, the ceremony was delayed a week and the broadcast was originally supposed to be held at the Westin Bonaventure Hotel in Los Angeles on August 22, 2021.

The nominations were announced via a livestream on July 8, 2021, by Mckenna Grace and Brooklynn Prince on the organization's official YouTube channel. Ted Lasso led the nominations with 8, followed by The Handmaid's Tale and WandaVision with 7 each. Channelwise, HBO and NBC led the nominations with 29 each, followed by Netflix with 28.

The HCA TV Awards also became the first television awards organization to separate streaming programs from broadcast network/cable shows, electing to give the streaming platforms their own separate category in comedy and drama, with the exception of the limited series/tv movie field, which isn't divided by platform.

Ted Lasso won the most awards of the night with four total, followed by The Crown with three.

== Winners and nominees ==
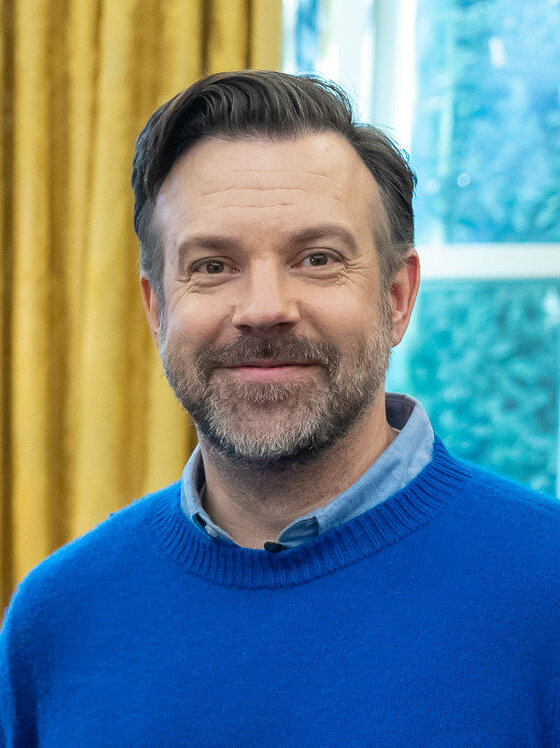
Jason Sudeikis, Best Actor in a Streaming Series, Comedy winner

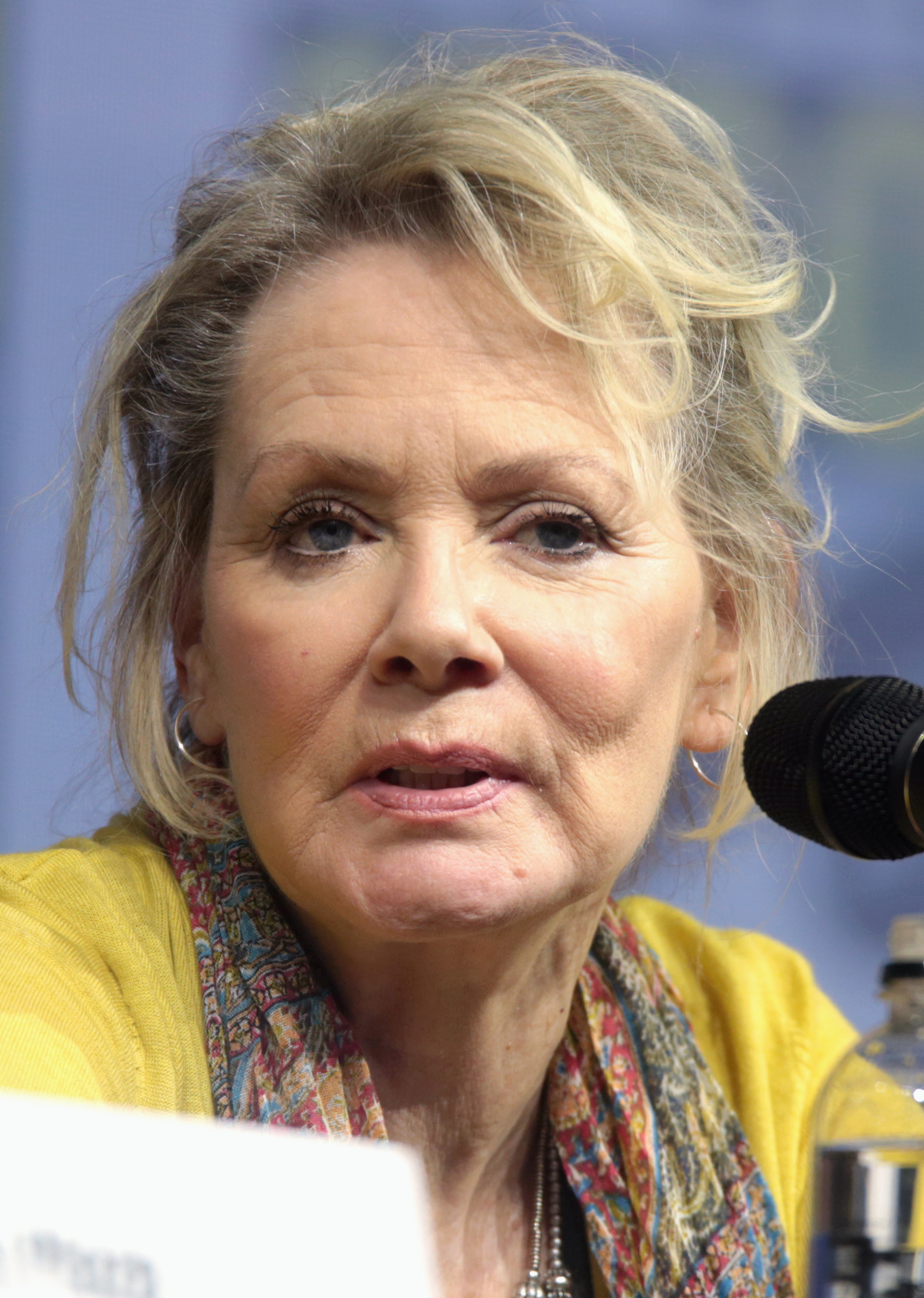
Jean Smart, Best Actress in a Streaming Series, Comedy winner

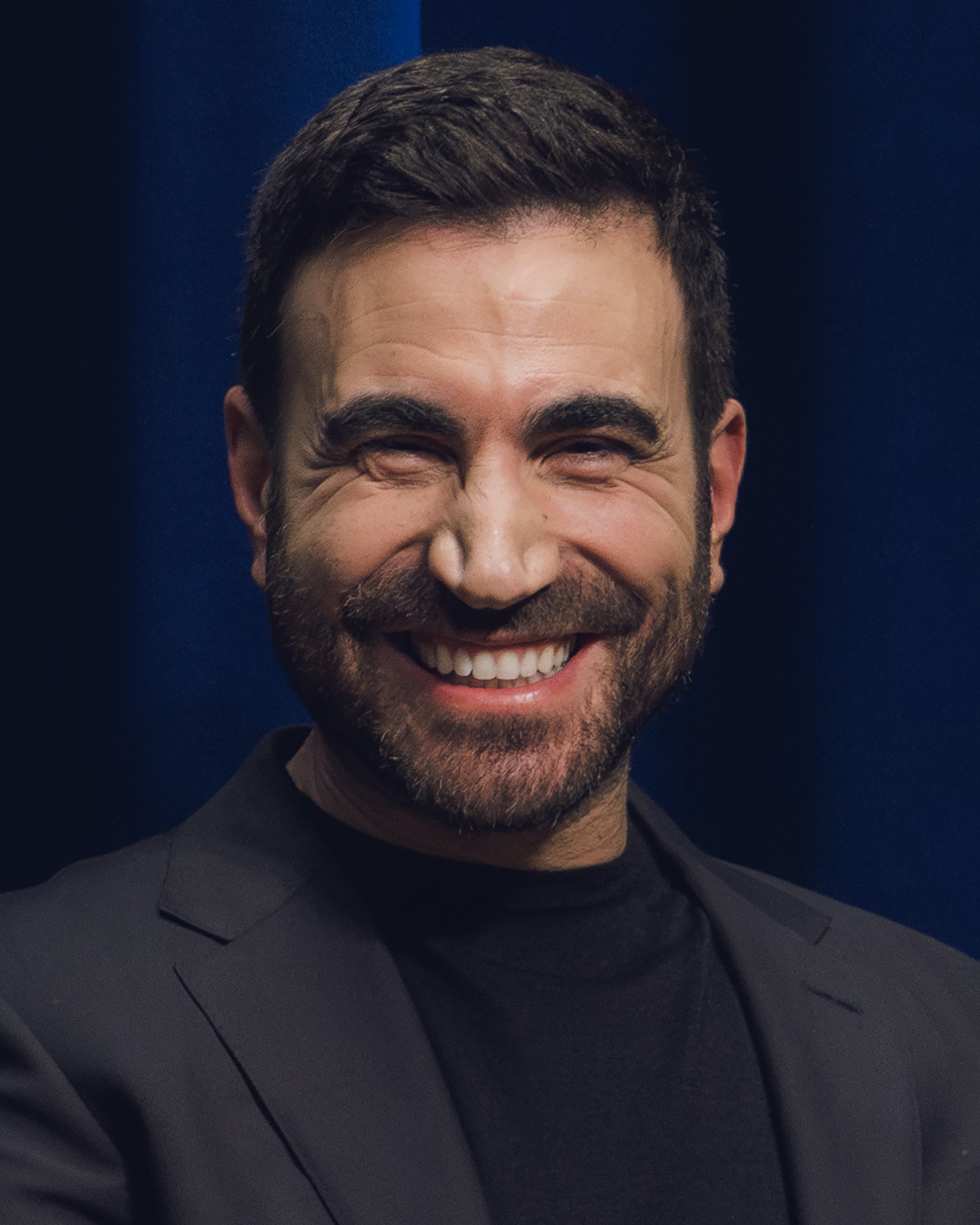
Brett Goldstein, Best Supporting Actor in a Streaming Series, Comedy co-winner

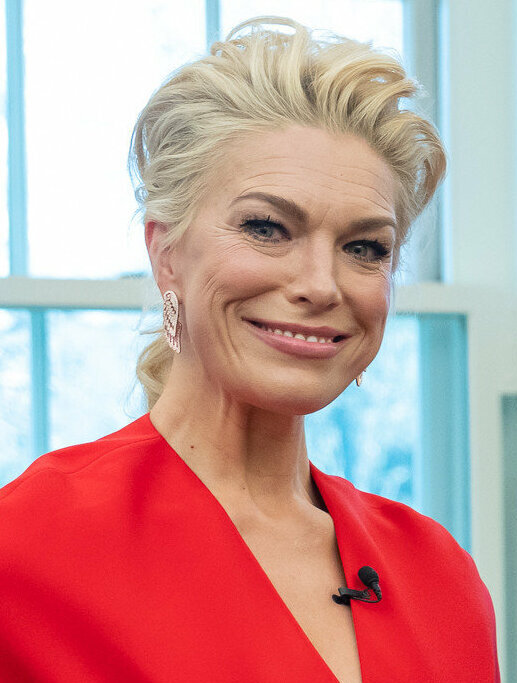
Hannah Waddingham, Best Supporting Actress in a Streaming Series, Comedy co-winner

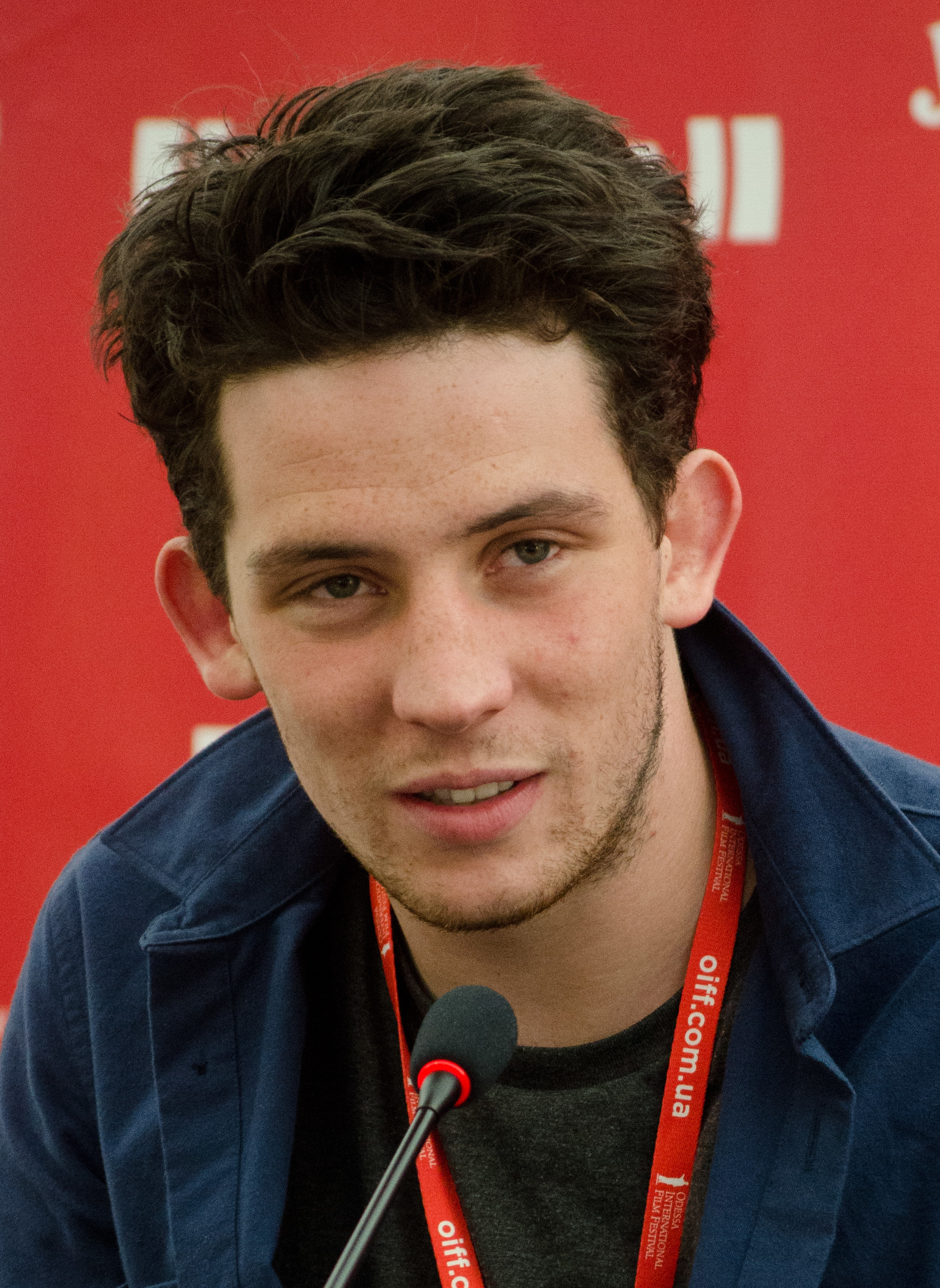
Josh O'Connor, Best Actor in a Streaming Series, Drama winner

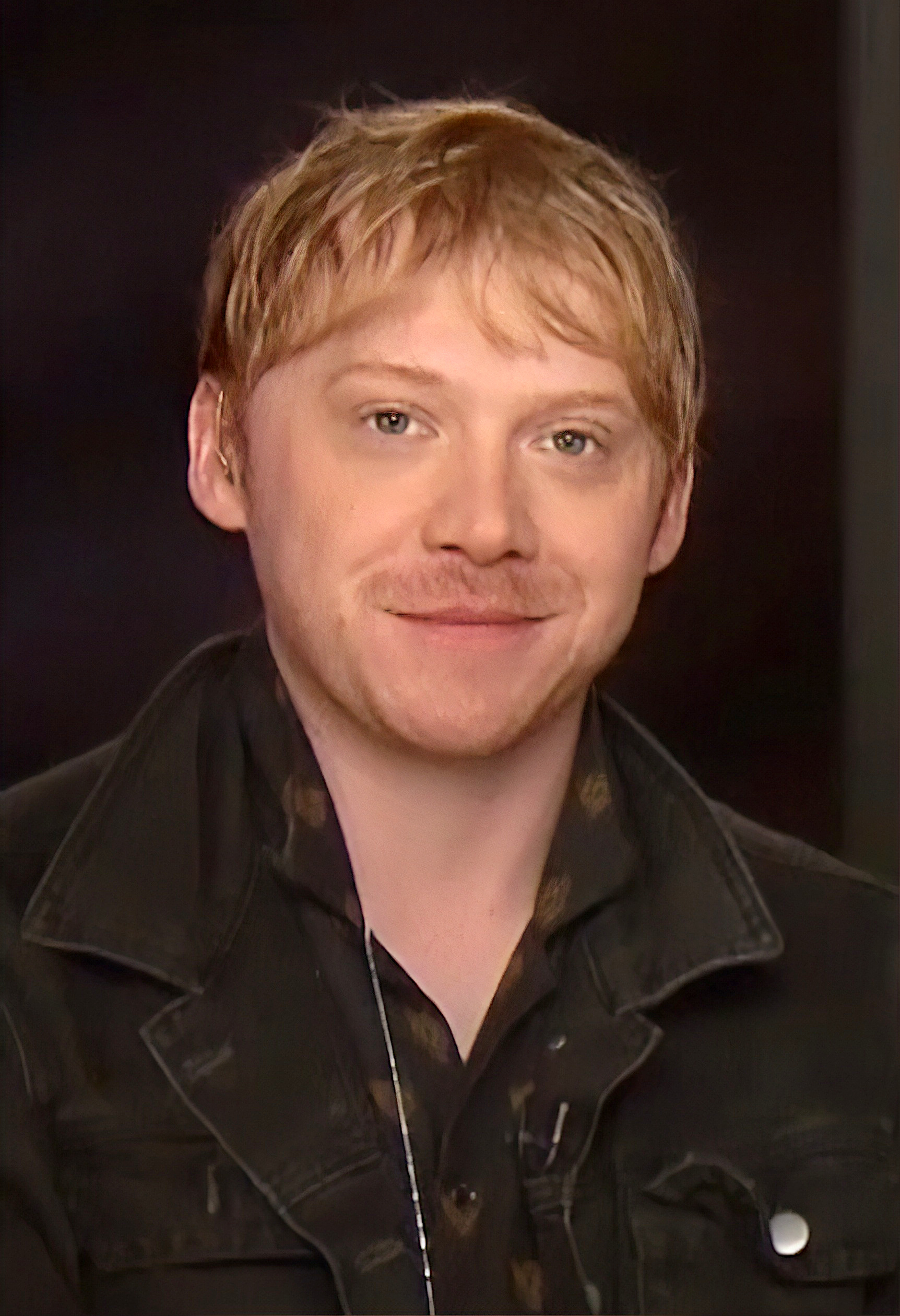
Rupert Grint, Best Supporting Actor in a Streaming Series, Drama winner

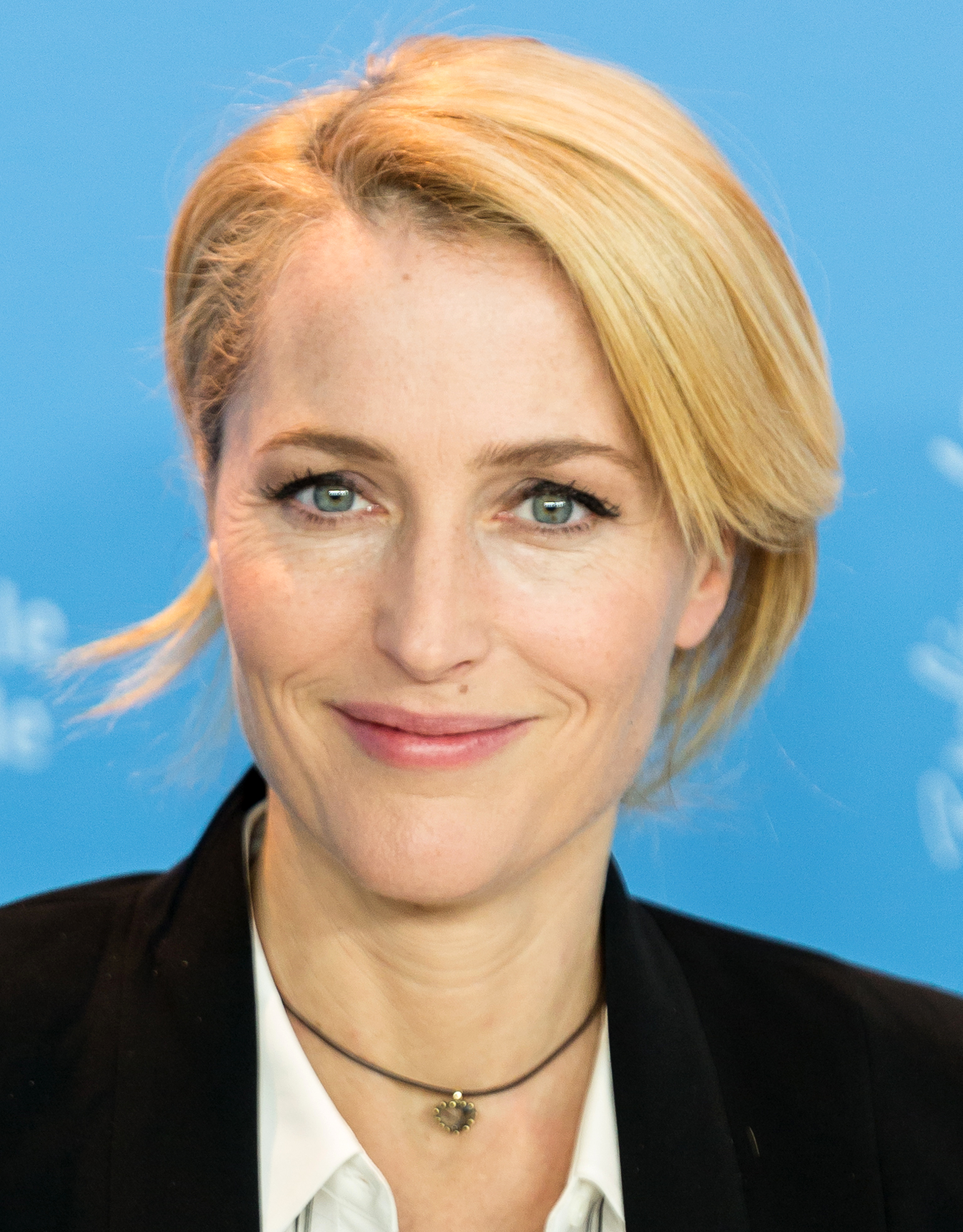
Gillian Anderson, Best Supporting Actress in a Streaming Series, Drama winner

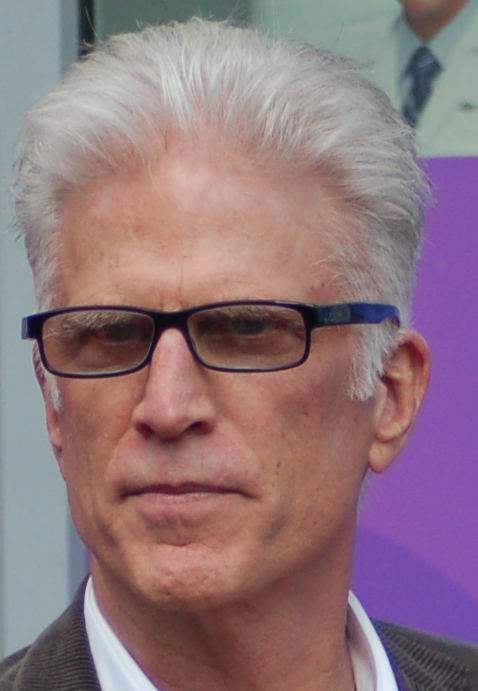
Ted Danson, Best Actor in a Broadcast Network or Cable Series, Comedy winner

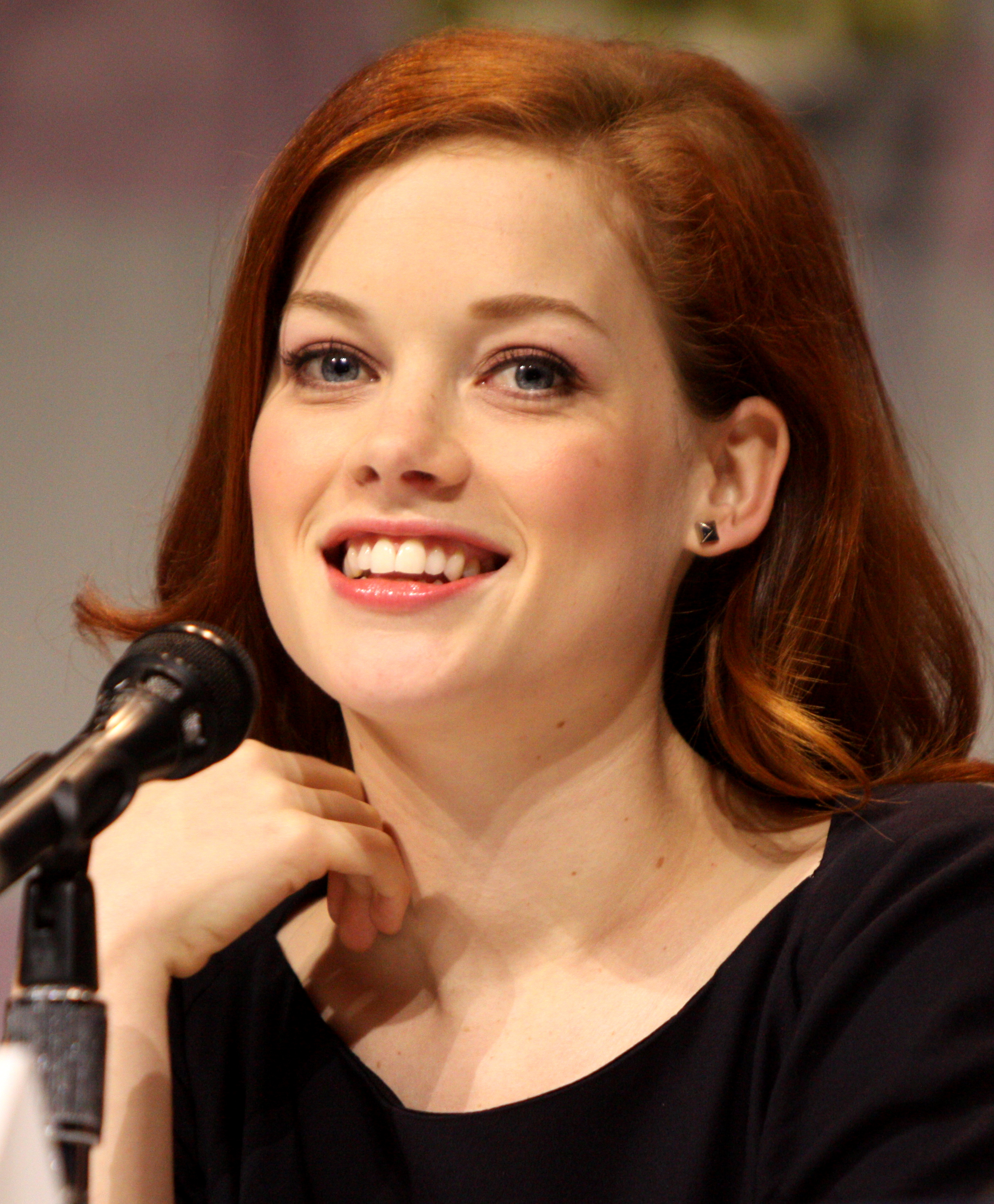
Jane Levy, Best Actress in a Broadcast Network or Cable Series, Comedy winner

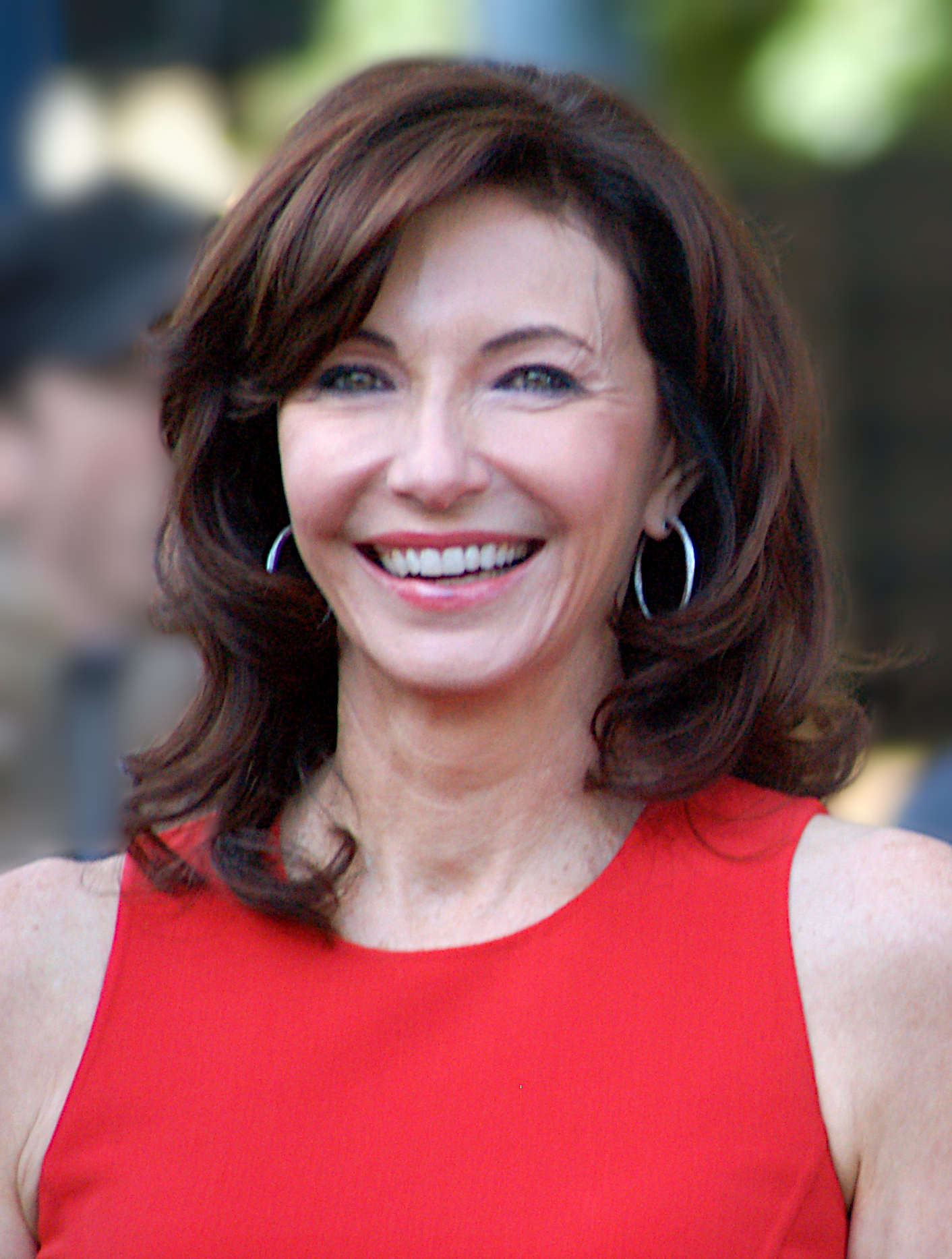
Mary Steenburgen, Best Supporting Actress in a Broadcast Network or Cable Series, Comedy winner

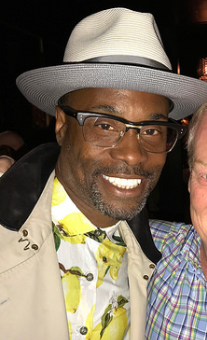
Billy Porter, Best Actor in a Broadcast Network or Cable Series, Drama winner

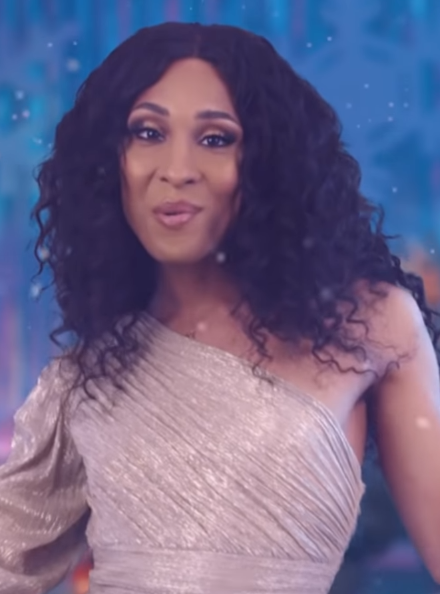
Michaela Jaé Rodriguez, Best Actress in a Broadcast Network or Cable Series, Drama winner

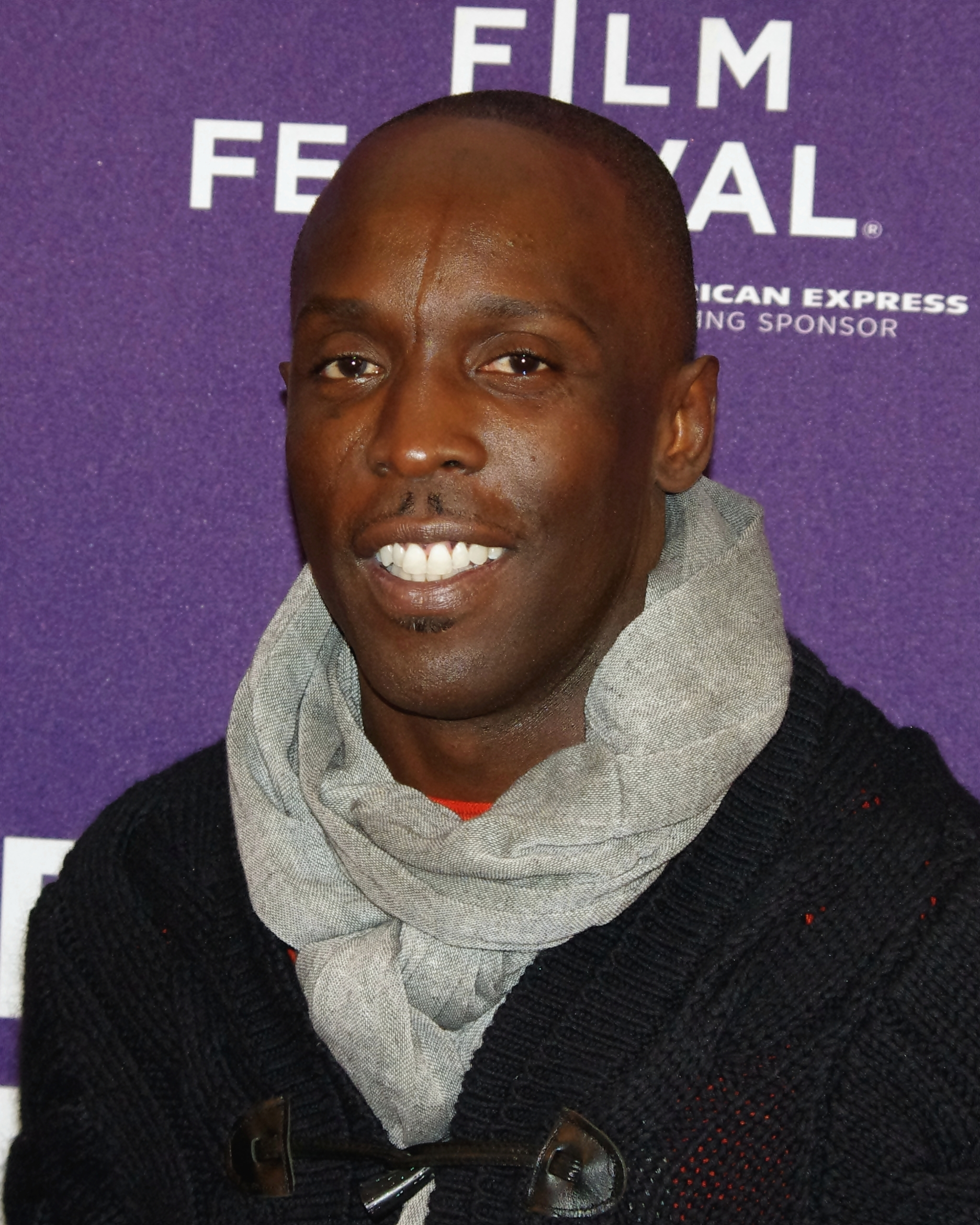
Michael K. Williams, Best Supporting Actor in a Broadcast Network or Cable Series, Drama winner

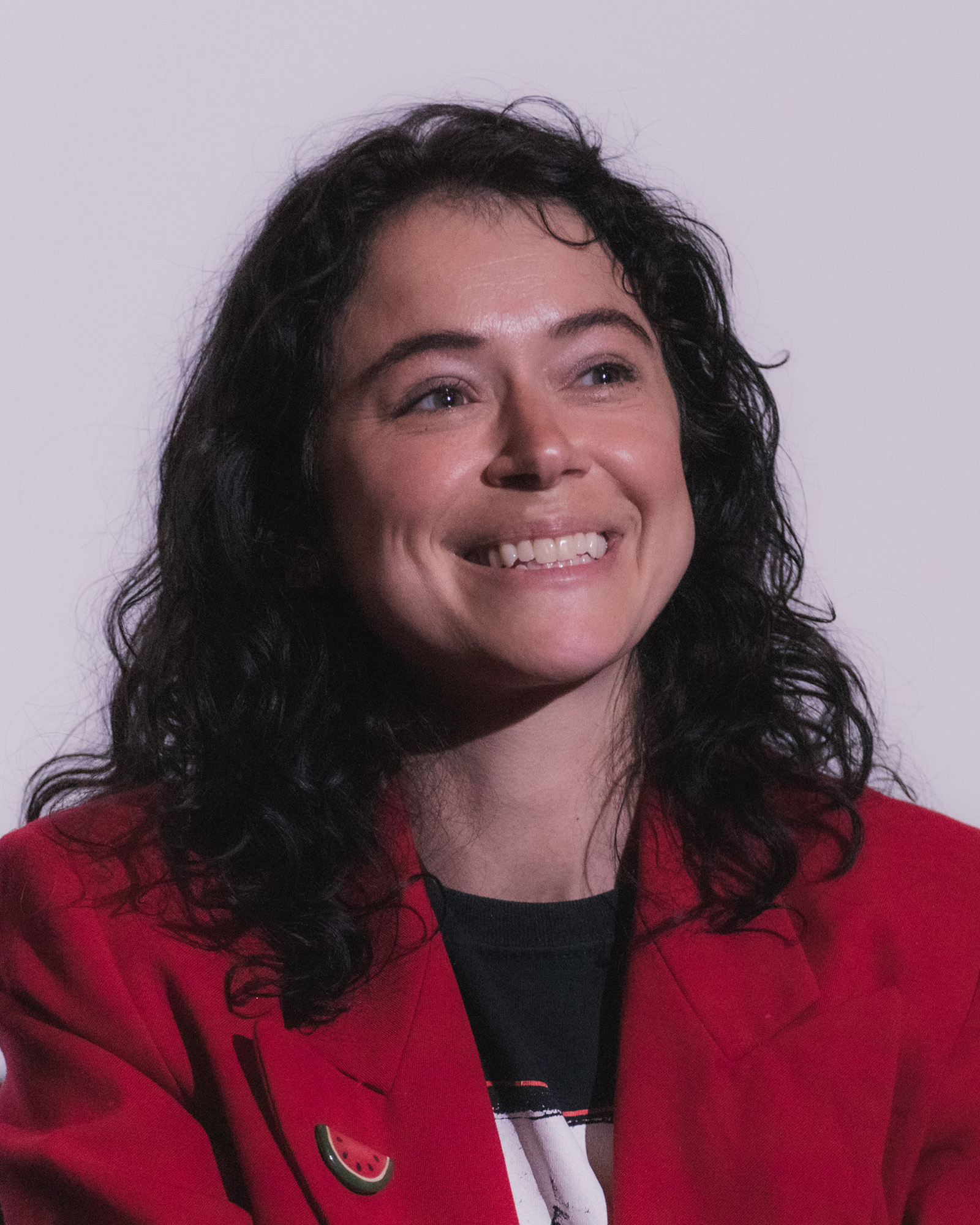
Tatiana Maslany, Best Supporting Actress in a Broadcast Network or Cable Series, Drama winner

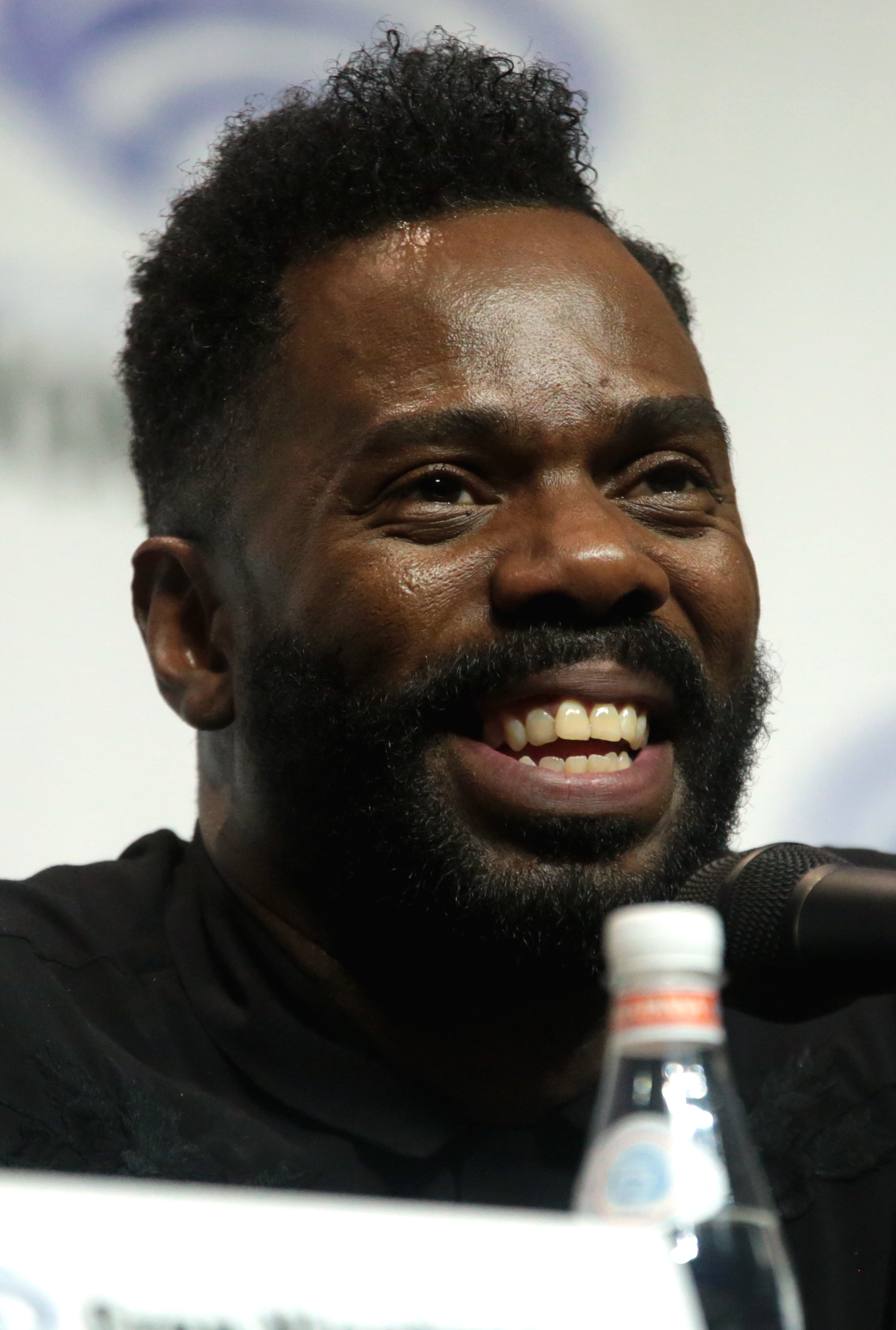
Colman Domingo, Best Actor in a Limited Series, Anthology Series, or Television Movie winner

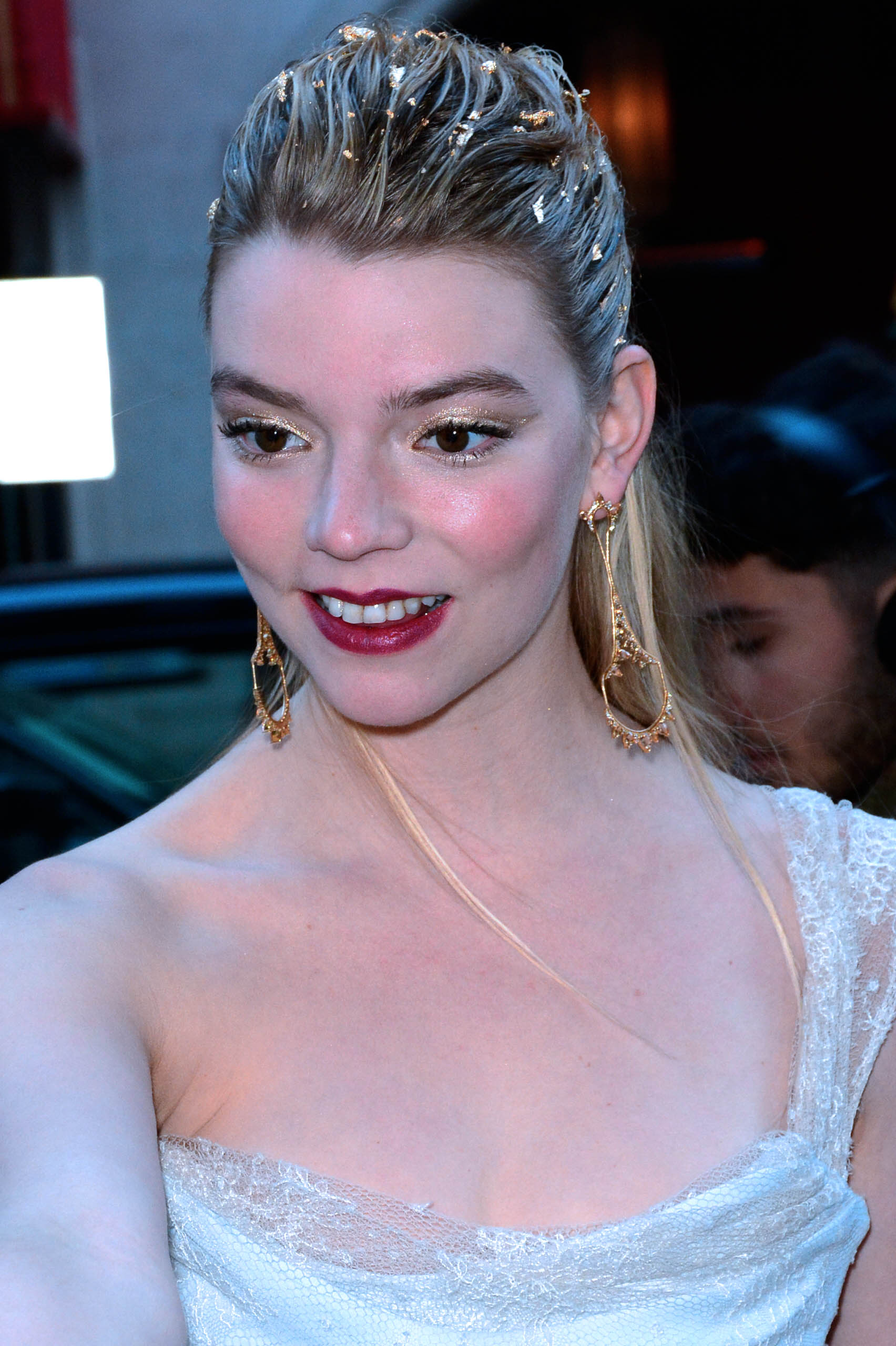
Anya Taylor-Joy, Best Actress in a Limited Series, Anthology Series, or Television Movie winner

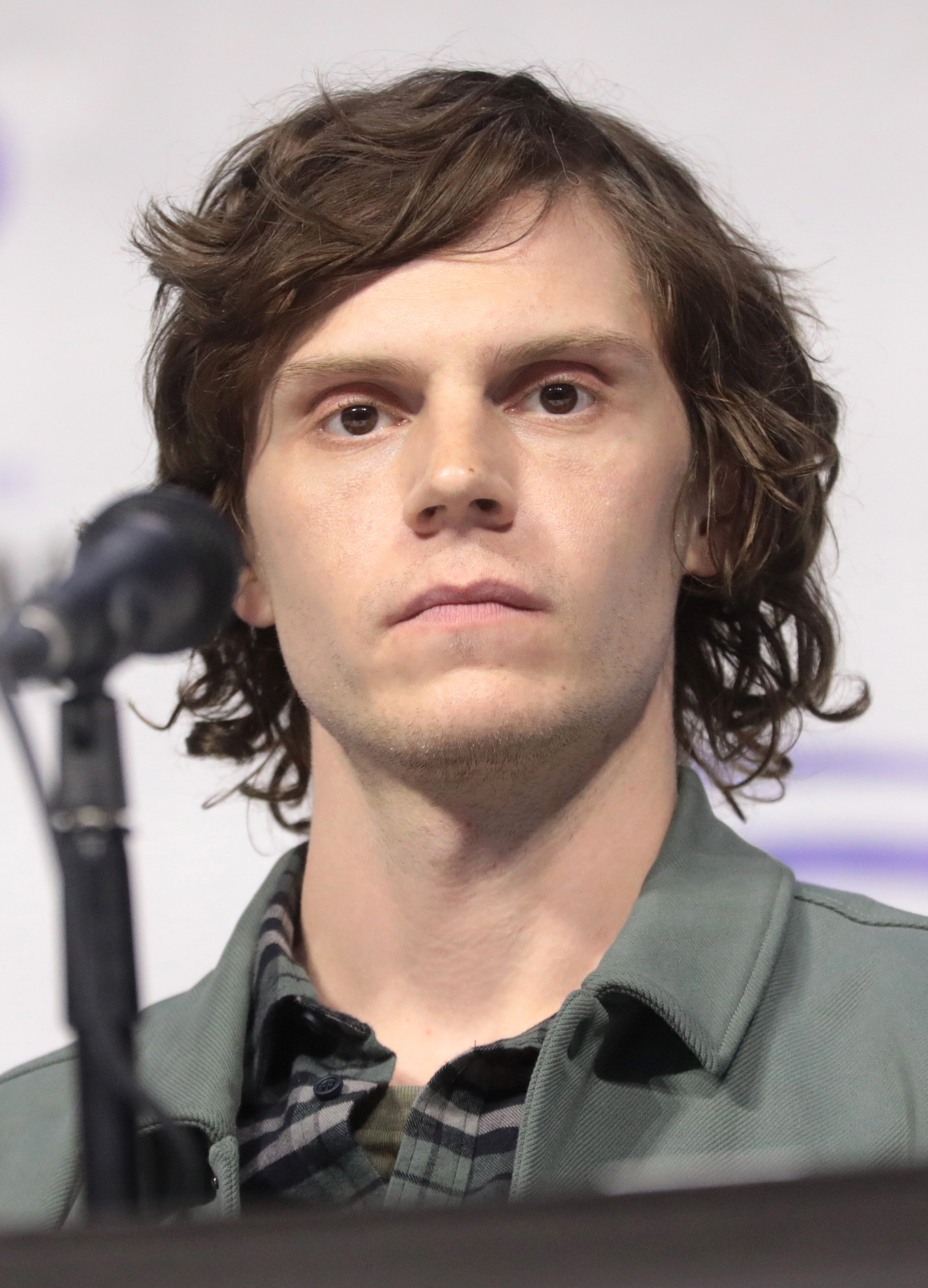
Evan Peters, Best Supporting Actor in a Limited Series, Anthology Series, or Television Movie winner

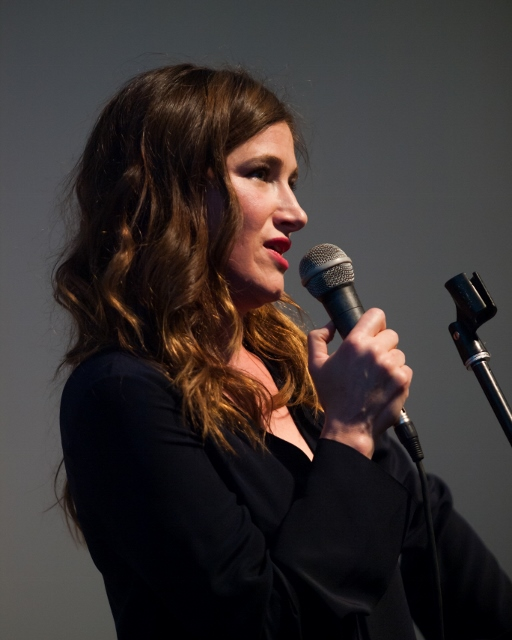
Kathryn Hahn, Best Supporting Actress in a Limited Series, Anthology Series, or Television Movie winner

Winners are listed first and highlighted with boldface.

=== Programs ===
==== Streaming ====
| **Best Streaming Series, Comedy**: **Ted Lasso (Apple TV+)**; Cobra Kai (Netflix); Girls5eva (Peacock); Hacks (HBO Max); Mythic Quest (Apple TV+); The Flight Attendant (HBO Max) | **Best Streaming Series, Drama**: **The Mandalorian (Disney+)**; Bridgerton (Netflix); Servant (Apple TV+); The Boys (Prime Video); The Crown (Netflix); The Handmaid's Tale (Hulu) |
| **Best Streaming Docuseries, Documentary Television Movie, or Non-Fiction Series**: **Kid 90 (Hulu)**; 1971: The Year Music Changed Everything (Apple TV+); American Murder: The Family Next Door (Netflix); Crime Scene: The Vanishing at the Cecil Hotel (Netflix); Heaven's Gate: The Cult of Cults (HBO Max); Murder Among the Mormons (Netflix); Pink: All I Know So Far (Prime Video); The Sons of Sam: A Descent Into Darkness (Netflix); Unsolved Mysteries (Netflix) | **Best Streaming Sketch Series, Variety Series, Talk Show, or Comedy/Variety Special**: **Bo Burnham: Inside (Netflix)**; 8:46 – Dave Chappelle (Netflix); A West Wing Special to Benefit When We All Vote (HBO Max); The Fresh Prince of Bel-Air Reunion (HBO Max); Friends: The Reunion (HBO Max); Jim Gaffigan: The Pale Tourist (Prime Video) |
| **Best Cable or Streaming Reality Series, Competition Series, or Game Show**: **RuPaul's Drag Race (VH1)**; Indian Matchmaking (Netflix); Nailed It! (Netflix); Queer Eye (Netflix); Selena + Chef (HBO Max); Top Chef (Bravo) | **Best Streaming Limited Series, Anthology Series, or Live-Action Television Movie**: **WandaVision (Disney+)**; Hamilton (Disney+); Small Axe (Prime Video); The Queen's Gambit (Netflix); The Underground Railroad (Prime Video) |
**Best Animated Series or Animated Television Movie**: **Harley Quinn (HBO Max)**; Animaniacs (Hulu); Big Mouth (Netflix); Bob's Burgers (Fox); Invincible (Prime Video)

==== Broadcast Network / Cable ====
| **Best Broadcast Network Series, Comedy**: **Young Rock (NBC)**; Black-ish (ABC); Mr. Mayor (NBC); Superstore (NBC); Zoey's Extraordinary Playlist (NBC) | **Best Cable Series, Comedy**: **Resident Alien (Syfy)**; Breeders (FX); Chad (TBS); Everything's Gonna Be Okay (Freeform); Shameless (Showtime) |
| **Best Broadcast Network Series, Drama**: **New Amsterdam (NBC)**; Big Sky (ABC); Law & Order: Organized Crime (NBC); Superman & Lois (The CW); The Good Doctor (ABC); This Is Us (NBC) | **Best Cable Series, Drama**: **Cruel Summer (Freeform)**; Gangs of London (AMC); Lovecraft Country (HBO); Perry Mason (HBO); Pose (FX); Yellowstone (Paramount Network) |
| **Best Broadcast Network or Cable Docuseries, Documentary Television Movie, or Non-Fiction Series**: **Welcome to Chechnya (HBO)**; 30 for 30 (ESPN); Allen v. Farrow (HBO); I'll Be Gone in the Dark (HBO); RuPaul's Drag Race: Untucked (VH1); The Vow (HBO) | **Best Broadcast Network or Cable Sketch Series, Variety Series, Talk Show, or Comedy/Variety Special**: **Last Week Tonight with John Oliver (HBO)**; A Black Lady Sketch Show (HBO); Full Frontal with Samantha Bee (TBS); Saturday Night Live (NBC); The Daily Show with Trevor Noah (Comedy Central); The Late Show with Stephen Colbert (CBS) |
| **Best Broadcast Network Reality Series, Competition Series, or Game Show**: **The Masked Singer (Fox)**; Celebrity Family Feud (ABC); Holey Moley (ABC); Shark Tank (ABC); The Voice (NBC) | **Best Broadcast Network or Cable Limited Series, Anthology Series, or Live-Action Television Movie**: **Mare of Easttown (HBO)**; Euphoria specials (HBO); Fargo (FX); I May Destroy You (HBO); The Undoing (HBO); Your Honor (Showtime) |

=== Acting ===
==== Streaming ====
| **Best Actor in a Streaming Series, Comedy**: **Jason Sudeikis – Ted Lasso as Ted Lasso (Apple TV+)**; Ed Helms – Rutherford Falls as Nathan Rutherford (Peacock); Michael Douglas – The Kominsky Method as Sandy Kominsky (Netflix); Rob McElhenney – Mythic Quest as Ian Grimm (Apple TV+); Tom Ellis – Lucifer as Lucifer Morningstar (Netflix) | **Best Actress in a Streaming Series, Comedy**: **Jean Smart – Hacks as Deborah Vance (HBO Max)**; Cristin Milioti – Made for Love as Hazel Green-Gogol (HBO Max); Kaley Cuoco – The Flight Attendant as Cassie Bowden (HBO Max); Hailee Steinfeld – Dickinson as Emily Dickinson (Apple TV+); Renée Elise Goldsberry – Girls5eva as Wickie (Peacock) |
| **Best Supporting Actor in a Streaming Series, Comedy**: **Brett Goldstein – Ted Lasso as Roy Kent (Apple TV+)**; Brendan Hunt – Ted Lasso as Coach Beard (Apple TV+); Danny Pudi – Mythic Quest as Brad Bakshi (Apple TV+); Jeremy Swift – Ted Lasso as Leslie Higgins (Apple TV+); Nick Mohammed – Ted Lasso as Nathan Shelley (Apple TV+); Patton Oswalt – A.P. Bio as Principal Ralph Durbin (Peacock); Ray Romano – Made for Love as Herbert Green (HBO Max) | **Best Supporting Actress in a Streaming Series, Comedy**: **Hannah Einbinder – Hacks as Ava Daniels (HBO Max) (TIE)**; **Hannah Waddingham – Ted Lasso as Rebecca Welton (Apple TV+) (TIE)**; Juno Temple – Ted Lasso as Keeley Jones (Apple TV+); Kaitlin Olson – Hacks as Deborah "DJ" Vance Jr. (HBO Max); Kathleen Turner – The Kominsky Method as Dr. Roz Volander (Netflix); Paula Pell – Girls5eva as Gloria (Peacock); Rosie Perez – The Flight Attendant as Megan Briscoe (HBO Max) |
| **Best Actor in a Streaming Series, Drama**: **Josh O'Connor – The Crown as Charles, Prince of Wales (Netflix)**; Anthony Mackie – The Falcon and the Winter Soldier as Sam Wilson / Falcon / Captain America (Disney+); Karl Urban – The Boys as William "Billy" Butcher (Prime Video); Pedro Pascal – The Mandalorian as The Mandalorian (Disney+); Regé-Jean Page – Bridgerton as Simon Basset, Duke of Hastings (Netflix) | **Best Actress in a Streaming Series, Drama**: **Emma Corrin – The Crown as Diana, Princess of Wales (Netflix)**; Aya Cash – The Boys as Klara Risinger / Liberty / Stormfront (Prime Video); Olivia Colman – The Crown as Queen Elizabeth II (Netflix); Elisabeth Moss – The Handmaid's Tale as June Osborne / Offred (Hulu); Sarah Paulson – Ratched as Nurse Mildred Ratched (Netflix) |
| **Best Supporting Actor in a Streaming Series, Drama**: **Rupert Grint – Servant as Julian Pearce (Apple TV+)**; Bradley Whitford – The Handmaid's Tale as Commander Joseph Lawrence (Hulu); Daniel Brühl – The Falcon and the Winter Soldier as Helmut Zemo (Disney+); Giancarlo Esposito – The Boys as Stan Edgar (Prime Video); Giancarlo Esposito – The Mandalorian as Moff Gideon (Disney+); Tobias Menzies – The Crown as Prince Philip, Duke of Edinburgh (Netflix); Wyatt Russell – The Falcon and the Winter Soldier as John Walker / Captain America / U.S. Agent (Disney+) | **Best Supporting Actress in a Streaming Series, Drama**: **Gillian Anderson – The Crown as Margaret Thatcher (Netflix)**; Alexis Bledel – The Handmaid's Tale as Dr. Emily Malek (Hulu); Ann Dowd – The Handmaid's Tale as Aunt Lydia Clements (Hulu); Ming-Na Wen – The Mandalorian as Fennec Shand (Disney+); Samira Wiley – The Handmaid's Tale as Moira Strand (Hulu); Yvette Nicole Brown – Big Shot as Sherilyn Thomas (Disney+); Yvonne Strahovski – The Handmaid's Tale as Serena Joy Waterford (Hulu) |

==== Broadcast Network / Cable ====
| **Best Actor in a Broadcast Network or Cable Series, Comedy**: **Ted Danson – Mr. Mayor as Neil Bremer (NBC)**; Alan Tudyk – Resident Alien as Dr. Harry Vanderspeigle (Syfy); Anthony Anderson – Black-ish as Andre "Dre" Johnson Sr. (ABC); Joseph Lee Anderson – Young Rock as Rocky Johnson (NBC); Martin Freeman – Breeders as Paul Worsley (FX) | **Best Actress in a Broadcast Network or Cable Series, Comedy**: **Jane Levy – Zoey's Extraordinary Playlist as Zoey Clarke (NBC)**; Daisy Haggard – Breeders as Ally Grant (FX); Robin Thede – A Black Lady Sketch Show as Various Characters (HBO); Stacey Leilua – Young Rock as Ata Johnson (NBC); Tracee Ellis Ross – Black-ish as Dr. Rainbow "Bow" Johnson (ABC) |
| **Best Supporting Actor in a Broadcast Network or Cable Series, Comedy**: **Nico Santos – Superstore as Mateo Fernando Aquino Liwanag (NBC)**; Alex Newell – Zoey's Extraordinary Playlist as Mo (NBC); Corey Reynolds – Resident Alien as Mike Thompson (Syfy); Dwayne Johnson – Young Rock as Himself (NBC); John Clarence Stewart – Zoey's Extraordinary Playlist as Simon (NBC); Skylar Astin – Zoey's Extraordinary Playlist as Max Richman (NBC) | **Best Supporting Actress in a Broadcast Network or Cable Series, Comedy**: **Mary Steenburgen – Zoey's Extraordinary Playlist as Maggie Clarke (NBC)**; Alice Wetterlund – Resident Alien as D'Arcy Bloom (Syfy); Ana Tuisila – Young Rock as Lia Maivia (NBC); Holly Hunter – Mr. Mayor as Arpi Meskimen (NBC); Lauren Ash – Superstore as Dina Fox (NBC); Vella Lovell – Mr. Mayor as Mikaela Shaw (NBC) |
| **Best Actor in a Broadcast Network or Cable Series, Drama**: **Billy Porter – Pose as Pray Tell (FX)**; Christopher Meloni – Law & Order: Organized Crime as Detective Elliot Stabler (NBC); Freddie Highmore – The Good Doctor as Dr. Shaun Murphy (ABC); Jonathan Majors – Lovecraft Country as Atticus "Tic" Freeman (HBO); Matthew Rhys – Perry Mason as Perry Mason (HBO); Sterling K. Brown – This Is Us as Randall Pearson (NBC) | **Best Actress in a Broadcast Network or Cable Series, Drama**: **Michaela Jaé Rodriguez – Pose as Blanca Rodriguez-Evangelista (FX)**; Chiara Aurelia – Cruel Summer as Jeanette Turner (Freeform); Jurnee Smollett – Lovecraft Country as Letitia "Leti" Lewis (HBO); Mandy Moore – This Is Us as Rebecca Pearson (NBC); Mariska Hargitay – Law & Order: SVU as Captain Olivia Benson (NBC); Olivia Holt – Cruel Summer as Kate Wallis (Freeform) |
| **Best Supporting Actor in a Broadcast Network or Cable Series, Drama**: **Michael K. Williams – Lovecraft Country as Montrose Freeman (HBO)**; Courtney B. Vance – Lovecraft Country as George Freeman (HBO); Dylan McDermott – Law & Order: Organized Crime as Richard Wheatley (NBC); Jason A. Rodriguez – Pose as Lemar Khan (FX); Jeffrey Dean Morgan – The Walking Dead as Negan (AMC); John Carroll Lynch – Big Sky as Rick Legarski (ABC); John Lithgow – Perry Mason as Elias Birchard "E.B." Jonathan (HBO); Tzi Ma – Kung Fu as Jin Shen (The CW) | **Best Supporting Actress in a Broadcast Network or Cable Series, Drama**: **Tatiana Maslany – Perry Mason as Sister Alice McKeegan (HBO)**; Brooke Smith – Big Sky as Merrilee Legarski (ABC); Catherine Zeta-Jones – Prodigal Son as Vivian Capshaw (Fox); Dominique Jackson – Pose as Elektra Evangelista (FX); Hannah Zeile – This Is Us as teenage Kate Pearson (NBC); Indya Moore – Pose as Angel Vasquez-Evangelista (FX); Kelly Reilly – Yellowstone as Beth Dutton (Paramount Network); Wunmi Mosaku – Lovecraft Country as Ruby Baptiste (HBO) |

==== Limited Series, Anthology Series, or Television Movie ====
| **Best Actor in a Limited Series, Anthology Series, or Television Movie**: **Colman Domingo – Trouble Don't Last Always as Ali Muhammad (HBO)**; Bryan Cranston – Your Honor as Michael Desiato (Showtime); Chris Rock – Fargo as Loy Cannon (FX); Hugh Grant – The Undoing as Jonathan Fraser (HBO); Joel Edgerton – The Underground Railroad as Arnold Ridgeway (Prime Video); Leslie Odom Jr. – Hamilton as Aaron Burr (Disney+); Paul Bettany – WandaVision as Vision (Disney+) | **Best Actress in a Limited Series, Anthology Series, or Television Movie**: **Anya Taylor-Joy – The Queen's Gambit as Beth Harmon (Netflix)**; Cynthia Erivo – Genius: Aretha as Aretha Franklin (Nat Geo); Elizabeth Olsen – WandaVision as Wanda Maximoff / Scarlet Witch (Disney+); Kate Winslet – Mare of Easttown as Marianne "Mare" Sheehan (HBO); Michaela Coel – I May Destroy You as Arabella Essiedu (HBO); Thuso Mbedu – The Underground Railroad as Cora Randall (Prime Video); Zendaya – Trouble Don't Last Always as Rue Bennett (HBO) |
| **Best Supporting Actor in a Limited Series, Anthology Series, or Television Movie**: **Evan Peters – Mare of Easttown as Detective Colin Zabel (HBO)**; Bill Camp – The Queen's Gambit as Mr. Shaibel (Netflix); Courtney B. Vance – Genius: Aretha as C. L. Franklin (Nat Geo); Daveed Diggs – Hamilton as Marquis de Lafayette / Thomas Jefferson (Disney+); John Boyega – Small Axe as Leroy Logan (Prime Video); Randall Park – WandaVision as Jimmy Woo (Disney+); William Jackson Harper – The Underground Railroad as Royal (Prime Video) | **Best Supporting Actress in a Limited Series, Anthology Series, or Television Movie**: **Kathryn Hahn – WandaVision as Agnes / Agatha Harkness (Disney+)**; Jean Smart – Mare of Easttown as Helen Fahey (HBO); Jessie Buckley – Fargo as Oraetta Mayflower (FX); Julianne Nicholson – Mare of Easttown as Lori Ross (HBO); Kat Dennings – WandaVision as Darcy Lewis (Disney+); Marielle Heller – The Queen's Gambit as Alma Wheatley (Netflix); Teyonah Parris – WandaVision as Monica Rambeau (Disney+) |

== Honorary Awards ==
- Legacy Award – Cobra Kai
- Virtuoso Award – Bo Burnham
- Impact Award – New Amsterdam
- TV Icon Award – Marta Kauffman
- Pop Culture Icon Award – Tom Ellis
- TV Breakout Star Award – Thuso Mbedu
- Spotlight Award – Zoey's Extraordinary Playlist

== Most wins ==
Wins by series
| Wins | Series |
|---|---|
| 4 | Ted Lasso |
| 3 | The Crown |
| 2 | Hacks |
| 2 | Mare of Easttown |
| 2 | Pose |
| 2 | WandaVision |
| 2 | Zoey's Extraordinary Playlist |

Wins by network/platform
| Nominations | Network |
|---|---|
| 7 | HBO |
| 6 | NBC |
| 5 | Apple TV+ |
| 5 | Netflix |
| 3 | Disney+ |
| 3 | HBO Max |
| 2 | FX |

== Most nominations ==
Nominations by series
| Nominations | Series |
|---|---|
| 8 | Ted Lasso |
| 7 | The Handmaid's Tale |
| 7 | WandaVision |
| 6 | Lovecraft Country |
| 6 | Pose |
| 6 | The Crown |
| 6 | Zoey's Extraordinary Playlist |
| 5 | Mare of Easttown |
| 5 | Young Rock |
| 4 | Hacks |
| 4 | Mr. Mayor |
| 4 | Perry Mason |
| 4 | Resident Alien |
| 4 | The Boys |
| 4 | The Mandalorian |
| 4 | The Queen's Gambit |
| 4 | The Underground Railroad |
| 4 | This Is Us |
| 3 | Big Sky |
| 3 | Black-ish |
| 3 | Breeders |
| 3 | Cruel Summer |
| 3 | Euphoria |
| 3 | Fargo |
| 3 | Girls5eva |
| 3 | Hamilton |
| 3 | Law & Order: Organized Crime |
| 3 | Mythic Quest |
| 3 | Superstore |
| 3 | The Falcon and the Winter Soldier |
| 3 | The Flight Attendant |
| 2 | A Black Lady Sketch Show |
| 2 | Bridgerton |
| 2 | Genius: Aretha |
| 2 | I May Destroy You |
| 2 | Made for Love |
| 2 | Servant |
| 2 | Small Axe |
| 2 | The Good Doctor |
| 2 | The Kominsky Method |
| 2 | The Undoing |
| 2 | Yellowstone |
| 2 | Your Honor |

Nominations by network/platform
| Nominations | Network |
|---|---|
| 29 | HBO |
| 29 | NBC |
| 28 | Netflix |
| 18 | Disney+ |
| 15 | Apple TV+ |
| 15 | HBO Max |
| 13 | Prime Video |
| 12 | FX |
| 11 | ABC |
| 9 | Hulu |
| 5 | Peacock |
| 4 | Freeform |
| 4 | Syfy |
| 3 | Fox |
| 3 | Showtime |
| 2 | AMC |
| 2 | The CW |
| 2 | Nat Geo |
| 2 | Paramount Network |

== See also ==
- 5th Hollywood Critics Association Film Awards
