= Astra TV Award for Best Cable Comedy Series =

Award presented by the Hollywood Creative Alliance

Astra Award for Best Cable Comedy Series
- Awarded for: Outstanding comedy series on cable television
- Country: United States
- Presented by: Hollywood Creative Alliance
- First award: 2021
- Currently held by: What We Do in the Shadows (2024)

The Astra Award for Best Cable Comedy Series is an annual award presented by the Hollywood Creative Alliance to honor the best comedy television series on cable television. It has been given since its inaugural edition.

== Winners and nominations ==
Winners are listed first in colored row and highlighted in boldface, followed by other nominees.

Year	Program	Network
2021 (1st)
2021 (1st)	**Resident Alien**	**Syfy**
2021 (1st)	Breeders	FX
2021 (1st)	Chad	TBS
2021 (1st)	Everything's Gonna Be Okay	Freeform
2021 (1st)	Shameless	Showtime
2022 (2nd)
2022 (2nd)	**What We Do in the Shadows**	**FX**
2022 (2nd)	Atlanta	FX
2022 (2nd)	Barry	HBO
2022 (2nd)	Better Things	FX
2022 (2nd)	Curb Your Enthusiasm	HBO
2022 (2nd)	Resident Alien	Syfy
2022 (2nd)	The Righteous Gemstones	HBO
2022 (2nd)	Somebody Somewhere	HBO
2023 (3rd)
2023 (3rd)	**Party Down**	**Starz**
2023 (3rd)	Atlanta	FX
2023 (3rd)	Barry	HBO
2023 (3rd)	Blindspotting	Starz
2023 (3rd)	Dave	FXX
2023 (3rd)	What We Do in the Shadows	FX
2024 (4th)
2024 (4th)	**What We Do in the Shadows**	**FX**
2024 (4th)	Curb Your Enthusiasm	HBO
2024 (4th)	It's Always Sunny in Philadelphia	FX
2024 (4th)	Resident Alien	Syfy
2024 (4th)	The Righteous Gemstones	HBO
2024 (4th)	Shining Vale	Starz
